= Grahovo (region) =

Historical region in western Montenegro

Grahovo (Montenegrin Cyrillic: Грахово) is a field and historical region in western Montenegro. The region's area roughly comprises 219 km^{2} (85 sq mi), west of Rudine, in the centre between Petrovići and Cuce, from the top of Orjen mountain to the west of the Ostrog Monastery.

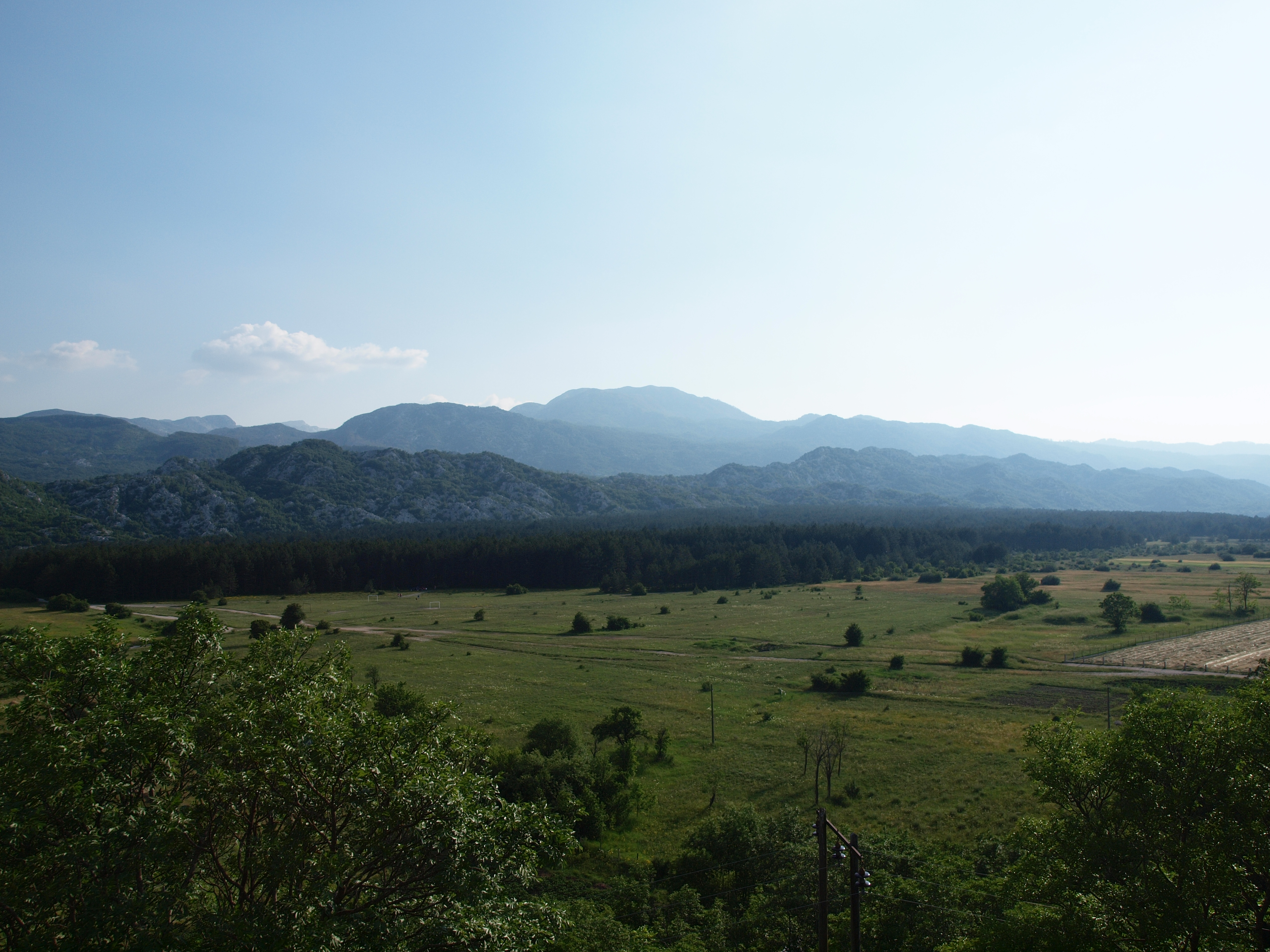
Grahovo field

== Etymology ==
The name Grahovo is composed of Serbo-Croatian grah (bean) (from Proto-Slavic *gorxъ) and -ovo (from Proto-Slavic *-ovъ), a suffix used in Slavic languages to indicate a placename, thereby making the name of Grahovo, 'place of beans'.

== Geography ==
Grahovo field is a small karst field in the northwestern part of Montenegro, not far from the border with Bosnia and Herzegovina northeast of Orjen. It covers an area of 6.4 km^{2} (2.5 sq mi), stretches for 7 kilometers (4.3 mi) and is 1.5 kilometers (0.93 mi) wide. The altitude of the field is 695–780 m (2,280–2,559 ft). It is close to the Risan Bay, which is 6.5 km (4.0 mi) away. Northeast of the field is the vast karst plateau of Katun Karst and Banjan, and to the west rises Orjen (1,894 m (6,214 ft)) and its branches.

The field was formed in limestones of Cretaceous age, on the border with dolomites, and its bottom was covered with fluvioglacial deposits of the Orient Glacia, with an average thickness of 10 meters (33 ft). Grahovo field belongs to the group of periodically flooded karst fields, so there are well-developed industries such as farming and livestock.

The Grahovo river flows through it, on which an artificial lake for watering was built. It has an average temperature of 2 °C (36 °F) in January and 23 °C (73 °F) in July. The annual rainfall is 2,895 mm (114.0 in). The fields occupy 50% of the field area, and the rest are meadows.

On the northern edge of the field is the springs of Grabovica, Grahovo River and Čeline. There is also an archeological site in the field - the Petkovići necropolis and the Grahovo settlement. A Stećak can be found in the Saint Nikola Church of Grahovo.

In the past, the borders to the south and east were different. The region was inhabited by the Riđani a tribe-clan that had assimilated or migrated by the end of the 17th century. Mountain ranges, Mt. Njegoš and Mt. Somina form a natural border to the north. Brekovac, Bratogošti, and Tisovac extend down to Trebišnjica and Bilećko Lake from the northwest to the southwest border. The southern and eastern boundaries of Banjani travel over hilly terrain, with no major natural barriers.

The Region of Grahovo is determined by the following settlements that were part of the Municipality which was abolished in 1960, The settlements are Balosave, Bare, Broćanac, Vilusi, Grahovac, Grahovo, Gornje Polje, Dolovi, Zagora, Zaslap, Jabuke, Nudo, Podbužer, Riječani and Spila.

== History ==
=== Pre-Slavic ===
The Western Goths invaded this area in 459, and the Eastern Goths conquered 488/489; years and managed it for about half a century (488–536), when it became part of the Byzantine state again.The movements of various peoples were constantly taking place. Already at the end of VI and start of the 7th century; after the destruction of Doclea (602), and the areas of the Slavs, who penetrate the Balkan Peninsula and inhabit it.The geographical names of settlements and buildings also speak of these diameters. Sites that have survived to this day, and bear the Illyrian-Romanesque or some mixed Illyrian-Romanesque and Slavic names (Balosave, Broćanac, Bobijerna, Deljevac, Droškorica, Katalina, Kurjaj, Mirotin, Maočići, Skorča, Gora, Tospude, etc.). It is interesting that the names of the villages and some larger ones localities (except Vilus and Spila) Slavic: Grahovo, Grahovac, Zaslap. Rijeka, Bara and so on. Slavs form their own social organizations. Among the most earlier it mentions Onogost (after the priest Dukljanin, created in the time of X to XII centuries).

=== Pre-Ottoman History ===
Grahovo was first mentioned in 1318, then in a Kotor document in 1377, and then again in 1399. Vilusi was mentioned in a Kotor Document in 1440. During the medieval period, it was inhabited by the Mataruge tribe. The region was settled by the Riđani specifically the territories of Krivošije and Cerovo Ždrijelo near Grahovo. According to traditional belief, the tribe Riđani and other brotherhoods extensively tried to emigrate towards the fertile lands of the Grahovo field, However they faced resistance from the Mataruge natives. Mataruge attacked settlers and travelers on the Risan-Grahovo route.

=== Ottoman History ===
During the times of the Ottoman Empire, After the establishment of the Nahija of Riđani, its seat was in Grahovo. The tribe was governed by its vojvoda (of Drobnjaci and Banjani) or by their knez (Prince of Riđani). In 1466 the subaşi of Riđani was Širmerd. In 1469 Riđani were one of the "Vlach" tribes that participated in the kidnapping of a young male and female population of Konavle and Herzegovina. They sold them to Ottoman subaşi, vojvodas, martoloses and Muslims in Trebinje who sold them as slaves. Riđani were registered in the first Ottoman defter (tax registry) of the Sanjak of Herzegovina, as part of the Novi kadiluk (modern-day Herceg Novi). One of the knezes (princes) of Riđani in the Ottoman period was Sinan, who was also chieftain of Banjani, and son-in-law of Ali Paša Hercegović.

In 1499 the Church of Saint Nikola was built by the Vujačić, Bulajić and Vučetić brotherhoods, remains in the time of the Risan prince Mirko Vujačić, when it was built by Ragusan investors.

In 1614, Mariano Bolizza wrote that Grahovo was situated in a beautiful plain, and commanded by Mile Perin. The settlement had 90 houses, out of which 70 were of the Serbian rite, and 20 were Turkish (Muslim). The town had 200 men in arms.

Grahovo remained part of the Ottoman Empire from 1465 until 1858

==== Venetian-Turkish conflicts ====
In 1649 the tribes of Nikšići, Riđani and Drobnjaci rebelled against the Ottomans capturing Risan, and Grahovo. This had been the first time Grahovo was ever liberated from Ottoman rule, Thus handing it over to the Republic of Venice. In mid-17th century their chieftain was Radul of Riđani. Riđani distinguished themselves in the struggle against the Ottomans, particularly during the late 17th-century Morean War. Riđani slowly fled west to Herzegovina, especially after the Ottomans established Nikšić as their stronghold, while remnants of Riđani with newly immigrated Uskoks formed three tribal societies: Krivošije, Grahovo and Nikšićke Rudine.

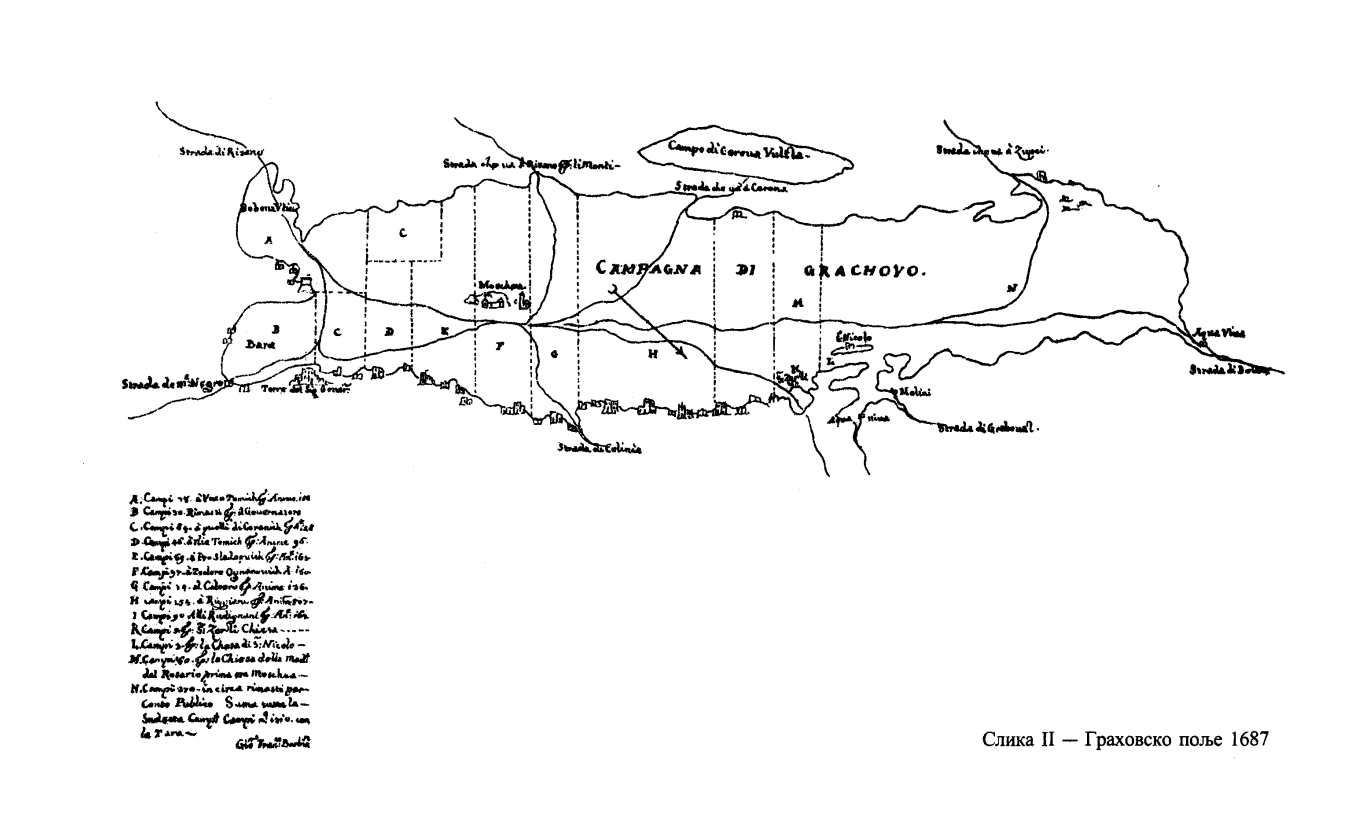
Map of the Grahovo Campaign, 1687, Grahovo Field

In 1687, A Prince named Ilija Balotić from the Drobnjaci tribe sent a letter to the town of Grahovo which according to him he would relieve the town and provide it with 100 families, of which 200 men were able to fight in the war. Another one of his writings conclude that he would attempt to strengthen the Grahovo field with 500 Soldiers, as to which they would guard places which were the most important. It was ordered by Ilija Balotić that with the Nikšići tribe, which demanded to have high salaries, that they would move into the Grahovo field on the day of Saint Nikola. The settlers will build and share homes with each other which will be organized and supported by Calvary Bolica, and Captain Krsto Zmajević from Perast. Since they showed their loyalty to the Campaign.

The joint Montenegrin-Venetian forces took control of Grahovo for 13 years, During their reign, Grahovo became an operation base for their troops in Herzegovina where they launched many attacks in Korjenići and Gacko. Grahovo remained under Venice until 1699 when the Ottomans at the Treaty of Karlowitz.

The significance of the attack on the Herzegovinian Turks was undertaken in 1738 by the citizens of Grahovo, Pivljani, Moračani, and Drobnjaci. The Riđani, as an old tribe, once inhabited the area from the togost to the glaciers above Risan. In anti-Turkish movements throughout the 17th century, especially in the Morean War, the tribe played a prominent role. Since the founding of the Turkish city in Niksic, it has begun, like the Niksic tribe, to weaken and displace, mostly in other parts of Herzegovina. From the rest of the population and new settlers, Uskoks, three smaller tribal groups were formed from the middle of the eighteenth century - Krivošije, Grahovo, and Nikšić Rudine, while a part of the territory of Riđa was appropriated by Čevljani and Cuce. The name Riđani remained in the name of only one village in the Nikšić field. The karst area of Grahovo, which stretches between Krivošije, Cuce, Banjani, and Nikšićki Rudini, was, as a border zone, the reason for frequent conflicts between Montenegrins and Turks. After the conflicts of 1836, 1852, and 1858.

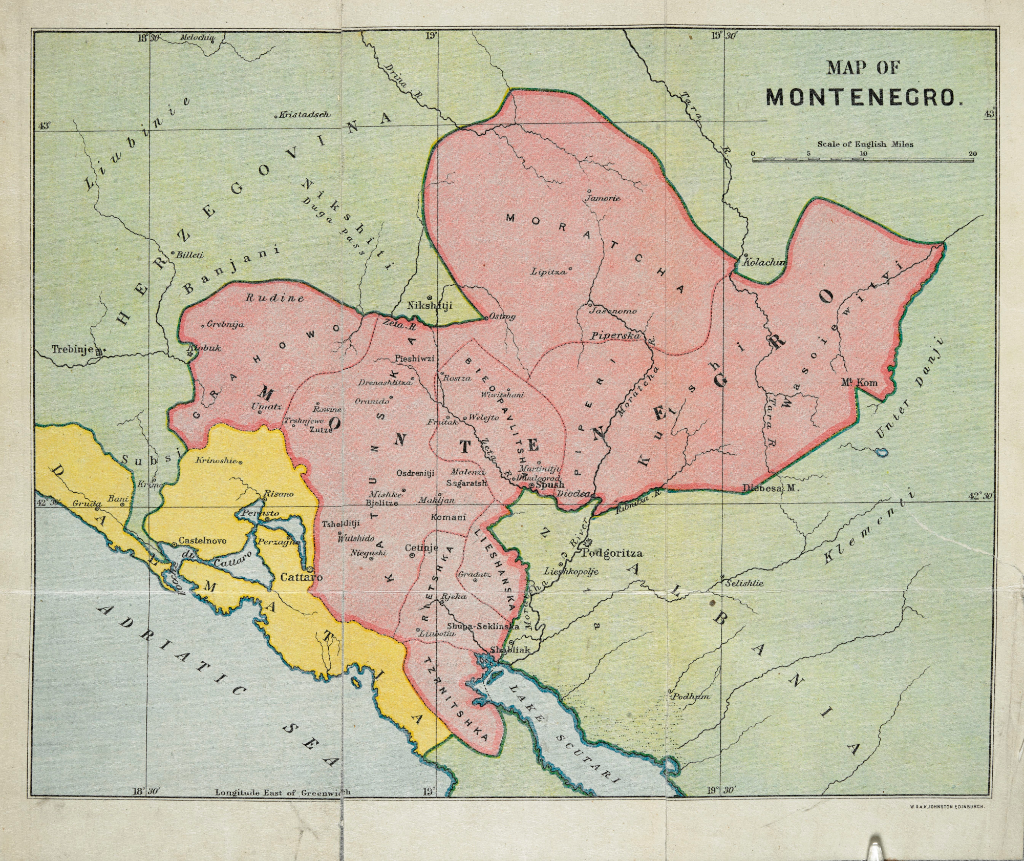
Grahovo presented in the top left of Montenegro

=== Grahovo Drama ===
Main articles: Battle of Grahovo, Battle of Grahovac

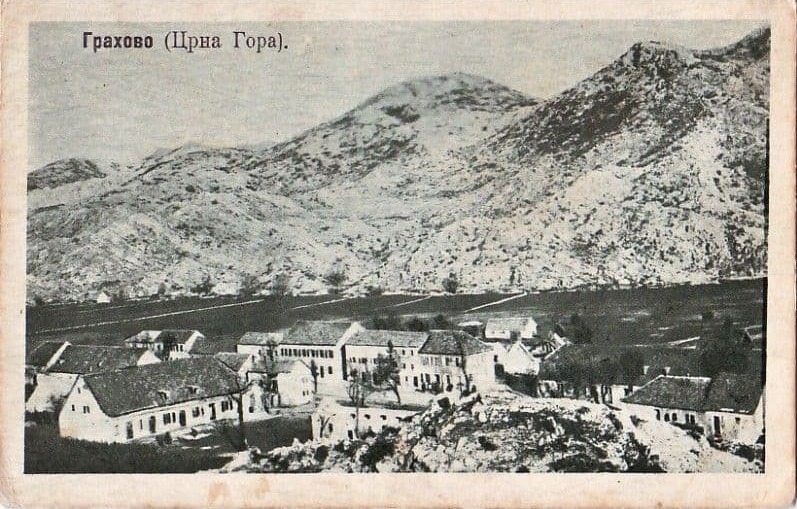
Picture of Grahovo

After the rise of Petar II Petrović-Njegoš to power in the Prince-Bishopric of Montenegro, members of the Grahovo tribe, led by vojvoda Jakov Daković refused to pay haraç to the Ottoman authorities and joined the rest of Montenegrins in guerrilla warfare in Ottoman-controlled Herzegovina, expressing the desire to unite with Montenegro. In response, Ali-paša Rizvanbegović, vizier of Herzegovina, attacked Grahovo in 1836 known as the Battle of Grahovo. The battle that ensued took place when a band of around 300 young men led by Joko Petrović-Njegoš, arrived at Grahovo and decided to attack the Ottoman army without waiting for reinforcements. The Ottomans retreated at first, and then ambushed the Montenegrins near the Čelina stream (Čelinski Potok), resulting in Ottoman victory and 70 Montenegrin casualties, including nine members of the House of Petrović-Njegoš, including the Prince-Bishop's teenage brother.

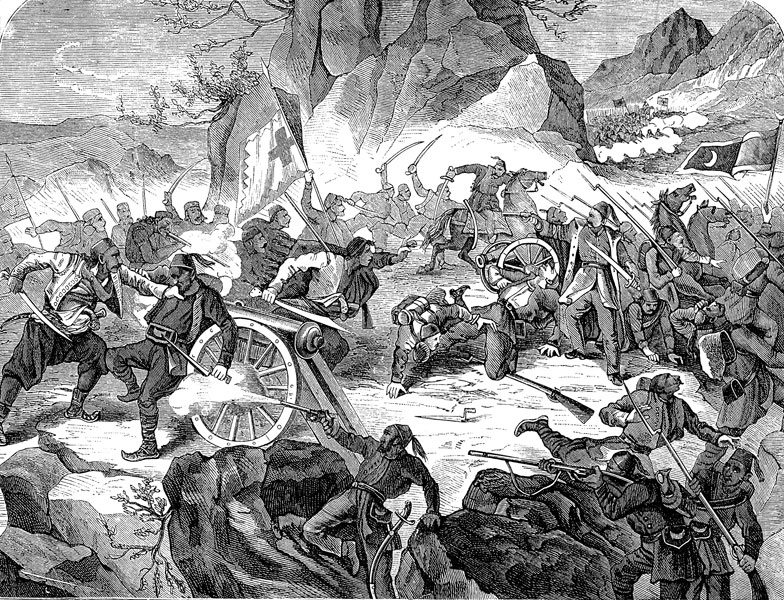
Battle of Grahovo

Four years after the Montenegrin defeat at Grahovo, seeking revenge for the death of his brother, Njegoš plotted the assassination of Smail-aga with the assistance of the local Christians from Herzegovina who lived on the territory under Smail-aga's control. Njegoš ordered a Montenegrin tribal leader, Novica Cerović, to ambush Smail-aga Čengić, the Ottoman commander who was responsible for killing Njegoš's brother Joko.

In late September 1840, Montenegrins attracted Čengić and his army deep into their territory, organized an ambush, and murdered them by attacking their camp during the night. The assault occurred in the village of Mljetičak, north of Nikšić. In the ensuing clash, Smail-aga was shot and killed, after which his severed head was brought to Cetinje. As a sign of his gratitude, Njegoš made Cerović a senator.

On 28 April 1858 Ottoman commander Hussein Pasha captured the villages of Vilusi and Grahovo and continued his advance towards Grahovac, a small village located on a plateau elevated slightly above the captured area. The core of Montenegrin resistance was in Grahovac, which was the main bastion of Montenegrin defense according to military plans. The fighting itself started on 29 April, early in the morning. The Ottomans attacked Grahovac while Montenegrins were stubbornly defending, determined not to retreat at any cost. Most of 3,000 Ottoman and 1,000 Montenegrin casualties were made on that day. On 30 April, Hussein Pasha offered a truce to Montenegrin commander-in-chief Grand Duke Mirko Petrović-Njegoš, but he refused it, although he did allow the Ottomans time to bury their dead. He also refused to send men to disrupt the Ottomans supply of water. Although this would have given him a tactical advantage, he considered it a dishonourable move.

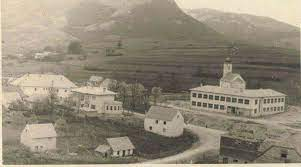
Grahovo in 1896

On 1 May, the fighting started again as the Ottomans got military support from Bosnia. But this time, Montenegrins took charge and attacked the Ottomans, forcing them into a successive retreat. The biggest problem for Montenegrins was a well-armed Ottoman artillery, which was constantly bombarding their positions with cannons. Eventually, Montenegrins decided to charge across the battlefield and take over the cannons. After they saw two of the commanders, Serdar (Count) Đuro Kusovac and priest Luka Jovović, being killed while charging, the rest of the Montenegrin troops, including the guardsmen, began a rapid advance with a shout: "Forward, to avenge our commanders". The offensive was successful, and by capturing Ottoman cannons, Montenegrins had officially won the battle. This major victory had had even more diplomatic significance. The glory of Montenegrin weapons was soon immortalised in the songs and literature of all the South Slavs, in particular the Serbs in Vojvodina, then part of Austria-Hungary. This Montenegrin victory forced the Great Powers to officially demarcate the borders between Montenegro and Ottoman Empire, de facto recognizing Montenegro's centuries-long independence. Montenegro gained Grahovo, Rudine, Nikšići, more than half of Drobnjaci, Tušina, Uskoci, Lipovo, Upper Vasojevići, and part of Kuči and Dodoši.

Prince Danilo granted all of the battle survivors the "Grahovo medal", and Mirko Petrović-Njegoš was proclaimed "Grand Duke of Grahovo". In 1864 King Nicholas I built the Church of the Ascension on the site of Hussein Pasha's headquarters, and in 2008, the Montenegrin government revealed an obelisk which honours the battle and its participants. Both on the church and the obelisk read the famous quotation from Petar II Petrović-Njegoš's The Mountain Wreath: The monument to your bravery is Montenegro and its freedom.

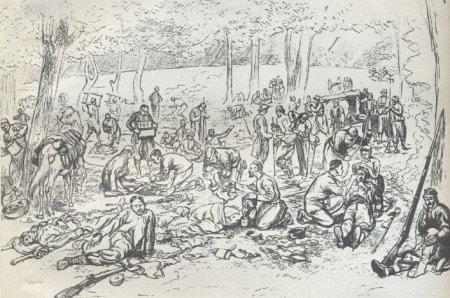
Drawing of a Polish hospital in Grahovo

=== International Red Cross ===
In Nikšićka Župa and Grahovo, the International Red Cross formed the first hospitals, a month and a half after Montenegro became a member of the International Red Cross in Geneva.

=== Royal Status ===
The Region is home to the Daković family which were titled as the Princes of Grahovo, the first mentioned was Jakov Daković. Although there is little information about his personal biography, He participated in battles against the Ottoman Empire, and was killed in 1853. After the battles of Grahovo and Grahovac, the Petrović Njegoš head, Mirko Petrović Njegoš, was awarded the Grand Prince of Grahovo, Most Montenegrin Kings and descendants of Royals were titled as Grand Prince of Grahovo even till this day (see: Boris, Hereditary Prince of Montenegro).

=== Christmas Awakening ===
Due to the large spread propaganda against the King of Montenegro, Nikola Petrović-Njegoš, Most of the population was against the Zelenaši Uprising of 1919. For unity, Nikola was left disappointed. When the uprising in Montenegro started, Captain Stojan Popović from Belgrade came to Grahovo and organized units against the rebellion. However, Grahovo was raided, burnt to the ground, looted and sacked. This was not what Grahovo expected as they had been largely for unity with Serbia. Grahovo was called to defeat the Zelenaši and they followed with it. Over 400 Soldiers and Officers were put to defeat the local Cuce Rebels. Akim Daković forced the Cuce to send 4 officers for peace negotiations. The Brđani raided Cuce in response and torched the area, After the Cuce found out, they called for Grahovo to help them.

=== World War Two ===
A monument of Sava Kovačević was erected on the view of the field Grahovo.

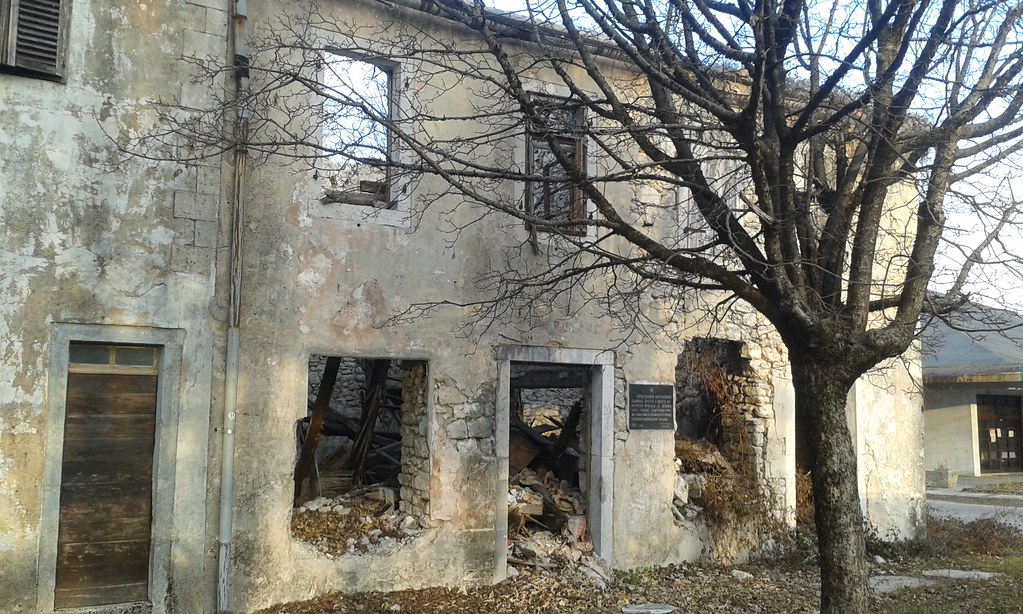
Ruined building in Grahovo's town due to the earthquake of 1979

=== Yugoslavia ===
During Yugoslavia, Its population was the highest in 1953, Following censuses showed a consecutive decrease in its inhabitants. Most of the population started to slowly leave the area and most notably a stream of emigration followed with the 1979 Earthquakes of Montenegro.

== Literature ==
During the times of the 19th to 20th century, in honor of the Battle of Grahovo and the Battle of Grahovac the Birth of Freedom-Grahovo was written.

_{"At that time, at the plant}

_{the tribe intended for us;}

_{evil is reaching us}

_{and it came upon us.}

_{Military parachute}

_{Grahovo was ours;}

_{a cross and a moon on his face}

_{green quarreled.}

_{Kosovo is irrigated}

_{with the blood of nine Jugovićs,}

_{Grahovo was soaked with the}

_{blood - of ten Petrovićs.}

_{Suffering, suffering, death}

_{by Zeman Ali Pasha}

_{tirelessly - and persistently}

_{our hands are shining.}

_{Grahovac finishes everything,}

_{our Grahovac miracle new;}

_{he avenges evil and penance,}

_{what is happening in Kosovo. "}

_{(King Nikola, "Grahovsko kolo" 1913)}

The legend of Dubnica and Milica Bulajić

A Turk, a fugitive from Korjenić, the owner of a large part of the land in Grahovac, stared at Milica, the daughter of Prince Bulajić from Grahovo. Milica did not want to become a Turk or follow him, even though he was seen loudly, but she told him in front of the people: "Make a well in Bar, and bring the living water to Ševrljug below Grahovac, and then you will be my master." When she heard that the prince's daughter was torturing and forcing the heavens, she told him: "If they work like this I will curse you for the tears and sweat of the people, and I will be cursed for the people who have brought misfortune on them and trampled on their faith. commands ". Beg agreed to this without discussion, continued the construction and in a year and a half finished the work to the satisfaction of the people of Grahovlje, the prince and his daughter. On the solemn day, when the water supply system was opening, in the presence of the fugitive, his entourage, the prince and the citizens of Grahovlje, young Milica inspected the water supply system - a gift from her fiancé. Then, with her father and the young fugitive, she climbed on the voat and watched the clear water of Ševrljug flow into the well. The people rejoiced and played, the prince rejoiced, and the young fugitive shone with pleasure. And just at that moment, young Milica spread her arms and shouted: "Goodbye father, goodbye and you, brothers, and don't mention me badly." People ran to stop her, and she screamed and jumped headlong into the well and drowned. in the presence of the fugitive, his entourage, the prince and the citizens of Grahovlje, young Milica inspected the water supply - the gift of her fiancé. Then, with her father and the young fugitive, she climbed on the voat and watched the clear water of Ševrljug flow into the well. The people rejoiced and played, the prince rejoiced, and the young fugitive shone with pleasure. And just at that moment, young Milica spread her arms and shouted: "Goodbye father, goodbye and you, brothers, and don't mention me badly." People ran to stop her, and she screamed and jumped headlong into the well and drowned. in the presence of the fugitive, his entourage, the prince and the citizens of Grahovlje, young Milica inspected the water supply - the gift of her fiancé. Then, with her father and the young fugitive, she climbed on the voat and watched the clear water of Ševrljug flow into the well. The people rejoiced and played, the prince rejoiced, and the young fugitive shone with pleasure. And just at that moment, young Milica spread her arms and shouted: "Goodbye father, goodbye and you, brothers, and don't mention me badly." People ran to stop her, and she screamed and jumped headlong into the well and drowned.

The song "Oj Junaštva Svijetla Zoro Oj" originates from the Battle of Grahovo, First recorded in 1863, It was a component song of the "Battle of Grahovo or blood feud in Montenegro" (Бој на Грахову или крвна освета у Црној Гори) heroic play in three parts.

== Demographic History of Grahovo ==
Kovačevići have 150 homes originating from Bosnia, The Bulajić have 110 homes, originating from Kuči. The Vujačići have 65 homes, originating from the Kuči.

Population of settlements of the former Grahovo municipality
| Settlement | 1948 | 1953 | 1961 | 1971 | 1981 | 1991 | 2003 | 2011 |
|---|---|---|---|---|---|---|---|---|
| Balosave | 153 | 169 | 135 | 267 | 106 | 63 | 42 | 34 |
| Bare | 352 | 390 | 345 | 255 | 93 | 163 | | |
| Broćanac | 277 | 277 | 259 | 219 | 84 | 116 | 92 | |
| Vilusi | 318 | 477 | 396 | 283 | 231 | 216 | 204 | 171 |
| Grahovac | 269 | 289 | 265 | 264 | 214 | 188 | 125 | 117 |
| Grahovo | 119 | 130 | 185 | 118 | 87 | 82 | 133 | 120 |
| Dolovi | 80 | 93 | 93 | 44 | 22 | 19 | 14 | |
| Zagora | 186 | 179 | 158 | 121 | 96 | 60 | 20 | |
| Zaslap | 193 | 189 | 165 | 131 | 101 | 84 | 65 | 53 |
| Jabuke | 181 | 174 | 149 | 132 | 62 | 23 | 33 | 33 |
| Nudo | 267 | 264 | 264 | 238 | 206 | 201 | 238 | 171 |
| Podbužer | 200 | 204 | 222 | 140 | 135 | 61 | | |
| Riječani | 45 | 180 | 153 | 139 | 66 | 69 | 52 | 52 |
| Spila | 312 | 236 | 54 | 156 | 105 | 72 | 58 | |
| In Total: | 2,952 | 3,351 | 2,853 | 2,507 | 1,608 | 1,417 | 1,076 | |

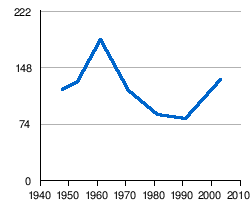
Graph of population change during the 20th century

Population of the town Grahovo
| Year: | Inhabitants |
|---|---|
| 1948 | 119 |
| 1953 | 130 |
| 1961 | 185 |
| 1971 | 118 |
| 1981 | 87 |
| 1991 | 82 |
| 2003 | 133 |
| 2011 | 120 |

== Economy ==
=== 19th century ===
In 1875 a hospital was created in Grahovo that had 60 beds and 4 doctors. In Grahovo there has been a postal service since 1896, and a telegraph service since 1907. There were over 100 people engaged in trading in the area of Grahovo. With the disappearance of border traffic near the then town of Grahovo, the economic decline of the place began and this decline is still visible to this day. The population of the town halved of which were engaged in trade and service activities, even the number of houses was halved since then. The same was the case with the then town of Vilusi.

=== Modern ===
The economy of Grahovo is supported mostly by cafes, a hotel and Agriculture of the field. Grahovo used to have 17 cafes and shops, billiards were played here between the two world wars, there was also street lighting, and each village had its own library. In addition, there was the local football club "Iskra". A Russian family (Tjuševskij) have recently moved into Grahovo from Orsk, Russia.

== Notable people ==
- Veljko Bulajić, Yugoslav film director
- Žarko Bulajić, Montenegrin communist politician
- Anto Daković Prince of Grahovo
- Jakov Daković Prince of Grahovo
- Marko Daković Politician and Leader of United Serb Youth of Montenegro
- Drago Obrenov Kovačević a Montenegrin Harambaša and Hajduk, known as a hero
- Filip Kovačević, Montenegrin author
- Nikola Kovačević, Montenegrin communist politician
- Sava Kovačević, World War II resistance fighter
- Veljko Kovačević Montenegrin General and writer
- Đuro Milutinović Blind Guslar of the Grahovo Tribe
- Gavrilo Princip by paternal ancestry of the Jovičević brotherhood
- Mehmed Aga Rizvanagić was an Ottoman Agha and descended from the Kovačevići in Grahovo
- Marko Vujačić politician and writer of Montenegro
- Petar Zimonjić Metropolite of Bosnia

== Gallery ==
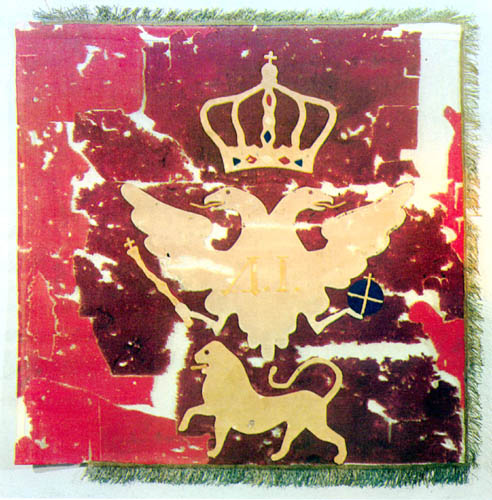
Flag used by the Montenegrin army in the Battle of Grahovac

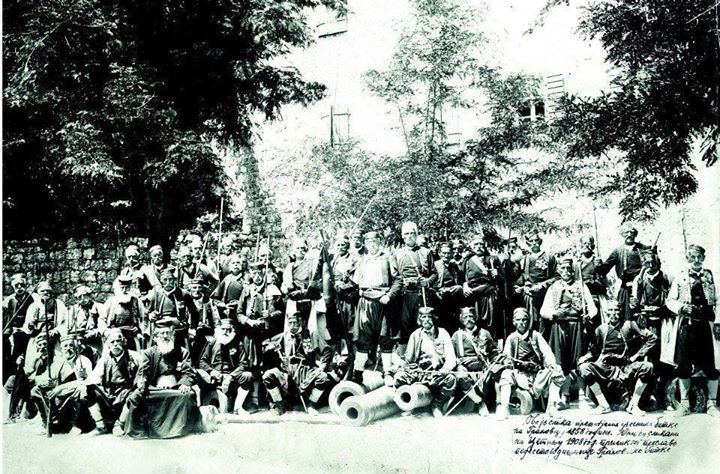
Surviving participants of the Battle of Grahovac, 1908

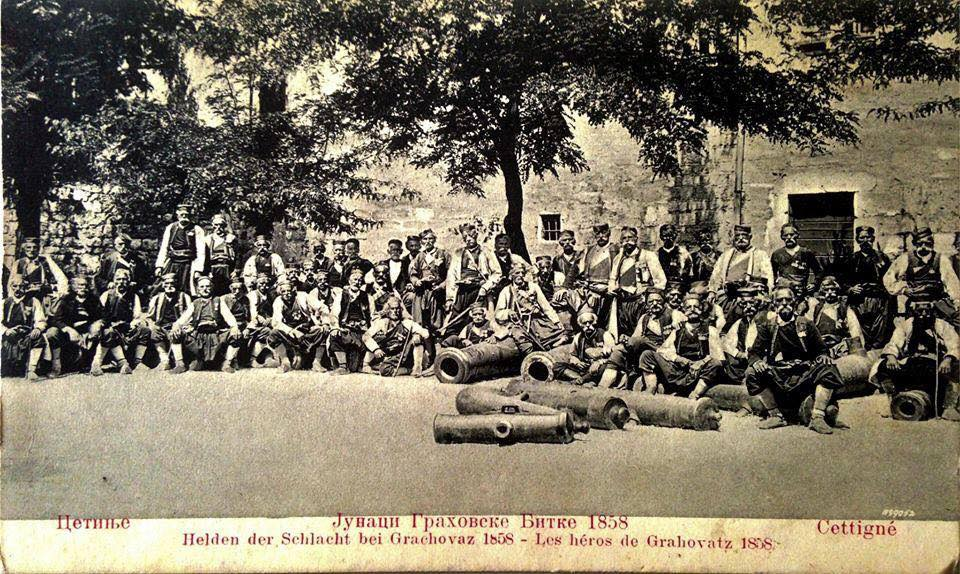
Veterans of the 1858 Grahovac Battle

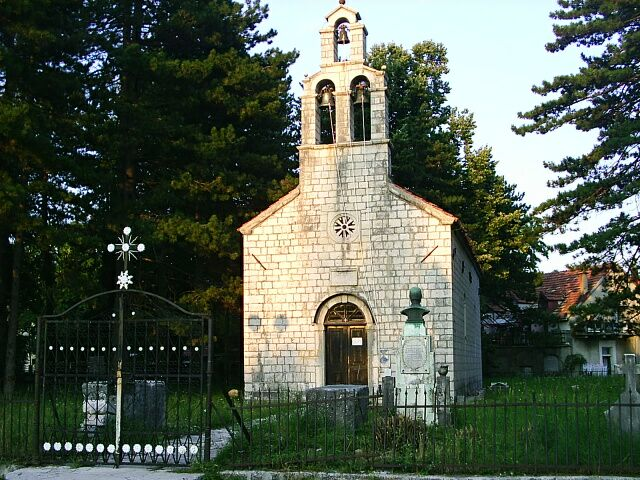
A rail guard of the Vlach Church in Cetinje was built of captured Ottoman rifle barrels in the Battle of Grahovac.
