= Church of Saint Nikola, Grahovo =

Serbian Christian Orthodox Church in Montenegro

Church of Saint Nikola Црква Светог Николе

Religion
- Affiliation: Serbian Orthodox
- Patron: Saint Nikola

Location
- Location: Grahovo, Nikšić, Montenegro

Architecture
- Groundbreaking: 1499
- Completed: 1502

The Church of Saint Nikola (Serbian Cyrillic:Црква Светог Николе) is an Orthodox Church in the field of Grahovo founded in the medieval times of the Ottoman Empire, in the Sanjak of Herzegovina.

== Foundation ==
The Church was contracted on February 16, 1499, to the Riđani tribe. It was built by the Vujačići, Bulajići and Vučetići brotherhoods. The church was ordered "on behalf of the municipality of Grahovo and the people of the surrounding places" by the Grahovo monk Lavrentije, who attended the contracting. Next to him, there were masons Radic Obradovic and Stjepko, a student of Radic Obradovic. It seems that they contracted with the famous Dubrovnik bricklayer, Matko Vlahušić, who, it seems, was the most respected master of all of them - "a bricklayer". The contract was specified in detail. From the dimensions of the church and the thickness and height of the walls to the fact that the masters will be allowed to go home eight days before Easter, with the obligation to return to Grahovo eight days after that holiday. However, only a day after the signing, there were complications, which made the contract invalid. This was probably due to the unusual wording in the contract, that, among other things, a vault would be made for "the whole mentioned church… good and solid, because many will consider this church extraordinarily built". The next day, February 17, the clerk put a note on the side which shows that Matko did not accept the obligation (condition) for the church to be "extraordinarily" built. Due to such an outcome, with Lavrentije's consent, Matko's place was left to other masons. The construction of the church began in 1499 and was most likely completed in 1502, since the last payment to the masters was made at that time (same). It is possible that the work was delayed due to the Venetian-Turkish war that broke out in 1499 and ended in 1502.

== Litije ==
In the events of the Litije (2020), Grahovo refused to give the property rights of the Church to the Montenegrin Orthodox Church.

== See also ==
- Grahovo (region)
- Grahovo Tribe
- Ridjani
