= Battle of Grahovo =

Battle

Date	26 August 1836
Location	Grahovo, Herzegovina Eyalet, modernday Montenegro
Result	Ottoman victory

Belligerents
Montenegro	Ottoman Empire

Commanders and leaders
Joko Petrović-Njegoš †	Ali-paša Rizvanbegović; Smail-aga Čengić

Strength
300	2,000–Several Thousands of Rizvanbegović's men

Casualties and losses
70	Unknown

Battle of Grahovo was fought on 26 August 1836 between the Ottoman Empire and Montenegro, and was a prequel to the more famous Battle of Grahovac (1858). The battle ended in Ottoman victory, and was most notable for the death of nine members of the ruling House of Petrović-Njegoš, including Joko Petrović-Njegoš, brother of the prince-bishop Petar II and Stevan Petrović-Njegoš, brother of Grand Duke Mirko.

== Background ==
After the rise of Petar II Petrović-Njegoš to power in the Prince-Bishopric of Montenegro, members of Grahovo tribe, led by vojvoda Jakov Daković refused to pay haraç to the Ottoman authorities and joined the rest of Montenegrins in guerrilla warfare in Ottoman-controlled Herzegovina, expressing the desire to unite with Montenegro. In response, Ali-paša Rizvanbegović, vizier of Herzegovina, attacked Grahovo in 1836 and occupied the town.

== Battle ==
The battle that ensued took place when a band of around 300 young men led by Joko Petrović-Njegoš, arrived at Grahovo and decided to attack the Ottoman army without waiting for reinforcements. The Ottomans retreated at first, and then ambushed the Montenegrins near the Čelina stream (Čelinski potok), resulting with Ottoman victory and 70 Montenegrin casualties, including nine members of the House of Petrović-Njegoš, including the Prince-Bishop's teenage brother.

== Aftermath ==
In 1838, a treaty was signed which declared Grahovo to be a neutral zone under a hereditary Voivode (Duke) which his dignity was confirmed by the Montenegrin Prince and Ottoman Governors.

Four years after the Montenegrin defeat at Grahovo, seeking revenge for the death of his brother, Njegoš plotted the assassination of Smail-aga with the assistance of the local Christians from Herzegovina who lived on the territory under Smail-aga's control. Njegoš ordered a Montenegrin tribal leader, Novica Cerović, to ambush Smail-aga Čengić, the Ottoman commander who was responsible for killing Njegoš's brother Joko.

In late September 1840, Montenegrins attracted Čengić and his army deep into their territory, organized an ambush and murdered them by attacking their camp during the night. The assault occurred in the village of Mljetičak, north of Nikšić. In the ensuing clash, Smail-aga was shot and killed, after which his severed head was brought to Cetinje. As a sign of his gratitude, Njegoš made Cerović a senator.
