= Kovačevići (Grahovo) =

Brotherhood in Grahovo, Nikšić, from the Grahovo Tribe

Kovačeviči (Serbian Cyrillic: Ковачевићи) are a brotherhood in Grahovo, Nikšić, from the Grahovo Tribe. The Kovačevići hail from several villages in Grahovo. They are by far the largest brotherhood of Grahovo.

== Origin ==
The Kovačevići are the largest brotherhood in Grahovo. The Progenitor of the Kovačevići brotherhood is Jovan Kovačević, they came from Jajce, Bosnia in the 1500-1600s and settled in Zaslap, and the Grahovo field. In 1709, a group of the brotherhood moved to Nevesinje.

== History ==
Some of the brotherhood moved to Nevesinje, Gacka, Stolac, Mostar, Zhupanje, and Lijevna. In Grahovo there were 9 brothers which settled, they built the Saint George Archangel Church. Today there are several hundreds of houses in Montenegro with origins from this brotherhood.

== Notable people ==
- Nikola Kovačević
- Sava Kovačević
- Drago Obrenov Kovačević
- Miloš Kovačević
- Vasilije Kovačević Čile
- Veljko Kovačević
- Vojo Kovačević
- Mirko Kovačević
- Mitar Kovačević
