= Riđani =

Historical tribe and region in Herzegovina

The Riđani (Serbian Cyrillic: Риђани) was a historical tribe and region in Old Herzegovina, modern Montenegro, that existed from the late medieval period until its annexion by the Principality of Montenegro in the mid-18th century.

== History ==
=== Origins ===
Although the Riđani appear to have been predominantly a romanized people (Vlachs), Albanian names also appear among them, as was the case with one of their leaders, katunar Šimrak.

=== Pre-Ottoman ===
The first mention of Riđani was in a 1335 document. The territory where they lived was between the Zeta river in the Onogošt župa (county) and Ledenice near Risan. In the first half of the 15th century, the Riđani territory belonged to the Duchy of Saint Sava. Their knez was Radivoj Sladojević. In contemporary Ragusan documents, they are described as Vlachs.

The earliest Ragusan sources about this tribe are early 15th-century records in which they are mentioned as Vlachi Rigiani. In 1429, the Ragusan senate invited them to take their livestock to Konavle mountains during the summer, for a certain fee. Riđani frequently invaded the region of Konavle and robbed it, so Ragusans complained to Stjepan Vukčić Kosača.

In 1430 a deal is struck between Riđani and some villages near Risan (Morinje, Police). In it Riđani agrees to stop attacking the villages, determine grazing borders as well as allowing free passage of caravans and other transit through their area. Representatives of Riđan at the meeting were Radjen Metiković, Vlatko Milobratović, Milorad Dragošević and Vukosav Bukumirović.

A 1441 document tells of their attacks and robbing of Ragusan merchant convoys. One 1451 document indicate that Riđani populated the region between Risan, Kotor and Vrsinje. Eventually, Riđani became one of three strong tribes in the region of Onogošt (Nikšić), besides Drobnjaci and Lužani. All three of them were governed by one ban. Ugren was among the most notable bans.

=== Ottoman era ===
After the Ottomans captured the region populated by Riđani it became known as the nahija of Riđani, with its seat in Grahovo. An Ottoman governor administered the nahija, while the tribe was governed by its vojvoda (of Drobnjaci and Banjani) or by their knez (of Riđani). In 1466 the subaşi of Riđani was Širmerd. In 1469 Riđani were one of the "Vlach" tribes that participated in the kidnapping of a young male and female population of Konavle and Herzegovina. Two Riđani siblings, Dobretić and Bukmir sold them for 16 ducats to Ottoman subaşi, vojvodas, martoloses and Muslims in Trebinje who in turn sold them as slaves. Riđani were registered in the first Ottoman defter (tax registry) of the Sanjak of Herzegovina, as part of the Novi kadiluk (modern-day Herceg Novi).

In 1597, envoys of Serbian Patriarch Jovan Kantul and vojvoda Grdan, chieftain of Nikšići and Riđani tribes, reported to Pope Clement VIII about the possibilities to raise an anti-Ottoman rebellion.

In mid-17th century their chieftain was Radul of Riđani. Riđani distinguished themselves in the struggle against the Ottomans, particularly during the late 17th-century Morean War. Riđani slowly fled west to Herzegovina, especially after the Ottomans established Nikšić as their stronghold, while remnants of Riđani with newly immigrated Uskoks formed three tribal societies: Krivošije, Grahovo and Nikšićke Rudine. In 1749 the Montenegrin tribal assembly (zbor), which was the supreme governing body of Montenegro, decided to accept Riđani as their own. After this event, the tribe ceased to exist.

== Legacy ==
Its name is preserved in toponyms and folk tradition. Some modern-day Serbo-Croatian families (including the Merćep family) descends from the Riđani. According to some legends, they populated the territory of Krivošije and Cerovo Ždrijelo near Grahovo. According to traditional belief, Riđani had been trying to migrate from their mountainous homeland to fertile lands of Grahovo (near Nikšić), facing resistance of its native people.

== Sources ==
- Knjiga (1980). Posebna izdanja. Naučna Knjiga.
- Banac, Ivo (9 June 2015). The National Question in Yugoslavia: Origins, History, Politics. Cornell University Press. ISBN 978-1-5017-0193-1.
- Delo (1971). Glas. Naučno delo.
- Katedra (1972). Prilozi prouc︣avanju jezika. Katedra za juz︣noslovenske jezike Filozofskog fakulteta.
- Novak, Viktor (1951). Istoriski časopis.
- Akademija (1992). Recueil d'études orientales. Akademija.
- Mihić, Ljubo (1987). Kozara: priroda, čovjek, istorija. Dnevnik.
- Vego, Marko (1957). Naselja bosanske srednjevjekovne države. Svjetlost.
- Vego, Marko (1982). Postanak srednjovjekovne bosanske države. Svjetlost.
- Ekmečić, Milorad (1995). Recuel de l'histoire de Bosnie et Herzegovine. SANU.
- Brozović, Dalibor (1999). Hrvatska enciklopedija. Leksikografski zavod "Miroslav Krleža". ISBN 978-953-6036-29-5.
- Hrabak, Bogumil (1997). Зборник за историју Босне и Херцеговине [Proceedings of the History of Bosnia and Herzegovina] (in Serbian). Академија.
- Hrabak, Bogumil (1997a). Riđani.
- Milić, Danica (1976). Simpozijum Oslobodilački pokreti jugoslovenskih naroda od XVI veka do početka prvog svetskog rata. Istorijski institut.
- Parovich-Peshikan, Maĭi︠a︡ (1980). Planinsko zaleće Rizinijuma: arheološke beleške iz Grahova, Krivošija i Cuca. SIZ kulture i naučnih djelatnosti--Nikšić.
- Pejović, Đoko (1981). Predmet i metod izučavanja patrijarhalnih zajednica u Jugoslaviji: radovi sa naučnog skupa, Titograd, 23. i 24. novembra 1978. godine. Crnogorska akademija nauka i umjetnosti.
- Šabanović, Hazim (1959). Bosanski pašaluk: postanak i upravna podjela. Oslobodenje.
- umetnosti, Srpska akademija nauka i (1978). Posebna izdanja.
- Parović Pešikan, Maja (1972). Starinar. Arheoloéski institut.
- Stanojević, Gligor; Vasić, Milan (1975). Istorija Crne Gore (3): od početka XVI do kraja XVIII vijeka. Titograd: Redakcija za istoriju Crne Gore. OCLC 799489791.
