= Jakov Daković =

- Јаков Даковић
- Born: 1794; Grahovo
- Died: 1853 (aged 58–59)
- Resting place: Grahovo
- Title: Grand Duke of Grahovo
- Predecessor: Pero Daković
- Successor: Anto Daković

Jakov Daković (1794-1853) was the Grand Duke of Grahovo and Hero of Montenegro.

== Biography ==
Jakov was born in 1794, in Grahovo to Pero Daković. He was part of the Daković brotherhood, of the Grahovo Tribe. His family descended from the Kuči tribe. They come by origin from the Vujačić brotherhood and taking the patronymic name of Dako Vujačić, the Grahovo Prince who was slain by Montenegrin tribesmen for his collaboration with the Ottomans.

== Military career ==
With the death of his father (Pero), The Grahovljani chose a new Grand Duke, Jakov. Jakov wished to unite Grahovo with Montenegro and declines to pay any Harac to the Ottomans. Along with a few other Tribal Leaders they head to Cetinje to Petar I Petrovic-Njegos under the name of Grahovo to unite it with Montenegro. The Vladika accepted his offer and thanked him for it. In a chance to regain control of Grahovo, The Turks list Jakov as the Grand Prince of Grahovo they won't require payment of Harac anymore or enter Grahovo, leaving Jakov in charge. The Ottomans gathered 7 nobles to launch an attack on Grahovo from the local Muslim towns, with Ali Pasha Rizvanbegović. Ali Pasha sent him a letter about his strain from the Turks as to which Jakov addressed the Grahovljani to where he tried to negotiate and keep peace however the Grahovljani expected Montenegro to support their cause which fueled further tension. Smail Aga Čengić and Ali Pasha Rizvanbegović launched their armies towards Grahovo in August 1836, at the head of the defense were Joko Petrović, brother of Njegoš. However, before Joko could arrive at Grahovo the Ottomans burned villages in Northern Grahovo and a part of the Grahovo field. Jakov and the Grahovljani retreat to the local cave where they begin to fight the Ottomans. As the Montenegrin reinforcements arrived, they were caught in a fire between two sides, the Ottoman Cavalry and the Grahovljani, they retreated to the mountain of Devršije, and the ones who didn't were killed, 57 Montenegrins and 22 Grahovljani were killed in the retreat. The Inhabitants of Grahovo fled to the Austrian border.

== Grand Duke of Grahovo ==
As tensions rose, The Vladika launched a decree ordering Jakov as Prince of Grahovo, "Ја Владика Петар, Митрополит Црногорски, постављам за Граховског војводу Јакова Перова Даковића-Вујачића".
