= Grahovljani =

Historical region and tribe of Old Herzegovina in Montenegro

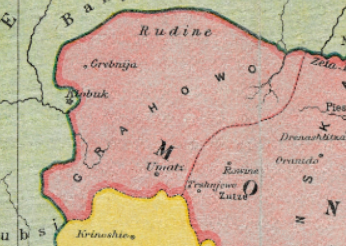
Map of the tribal region of Grahovo

The Grahovo tribe (Serbian: племе Грахово / pleme Grahovo) or Grahovljani (Serbian Cyrillic: Граховљани) (Note: The name can be based on others; the official name is Grahovo, however it can be Grahovljani (plural) and Grahovljan (singular).) is a historical Serbo-Montenegrin tribe and region of Old Herzegovina in Montenegro. The tribe was formed on Brotherhoods and other extinct tribes of Montenegro being one of the sixteen tribes of Herzegovina, along with the Riđani, Piva, Drobnjaci, Krivošije, Nikšići, Banjani, Mataruge, and others.

== Etymology ==
The name Grahovljani is an demonym for the place name Grahovo which is composed of Serbian grah ('bean')(from Proto-Slavic *gorxъ) and -ovo (from Proto-Slavic *-ovъ), a suffix used in Slavic languages to indicate a placename, thereby making the name of Grahovo, 'place of beans'.

== Geography ==
The tribe of Grahovo is located in correlation with the region of Grahovo. Its region is determined by the following settlements, which were a part of the Municipality of Grahovo that was abolished in 1960. The settlements are Balosave, Bare, Broćanac, Vilusi, Grahovac, Grahovo, Gornje Polje, Dolovi, Zagora, Zaslap, Jabuke, Nudo, Podbožur, Riječani and Spila. As a tribe, they are mainly centered around the two localities of Vilusi, and Grahovo field.

== History ==
=== Origin ===
The Grahovo tribe was formed around the end of the 17th century and beginning of the 18th century. The tribe was formed by the Nikšići, Drobnjaci, Banjani, Riđani and Kuči during the Grahovo campaign in 1695. Like many other tribes, the Grahovljani weren't formed by a paternal ancestor, rather a group of merging tribes and brotherhoods. According to Petar II Petrović-Njegoš, his great-grandfather and the captain of the Nikšići settled the Grahovo tribe.

== Brotherhoods ==
There were once 69 brotherhoods in the Grahovo tribe with 4,000 people Brotherhoods of the Grahovo tribe include:

- Andrijaševići
- Antunovići
- Vujačići
- Vujovići
- Vučkovići
- Bulajići
- Vučetići
- Gluščevići
- Dabovići
- Dakovići
- Delibašići
- Denda
- Dragojevci
- Jovićiči
- Kapor
- Kovačevići
- Kujačić
- Kešelj
- Luburići
- Milovići
- Musić
- Hadžićuković

=== Vujačići ===
The Vujačići are the oldest brotherhood of the Grahovo tribe. Their etymology derives from a female ancestor named Vujača since her husband was killed in Kuci by the Ottomans therefore raising her kids alone and they adopted her name as a matronym. Their Progenitor was Dragoje he had three sons which split apart (Soroje, Boroje, Luka and Majo) and formed the brotherhoods (Vujačići, Bulajići and Vučetići). They descended from the Kuči and Riđani which wiped out the Mataruge tribe in the Medieval Period.

=== Kovačevići ===
The Kovačevići are the largest brotherhood in Grahovo. The Progenitor of the Kovačevići brotherhood is Jovan Kovačević, They came from Jajce, Bosnia in the 1500-1600s and settled in Zaslap, and the Grahovo field. In 1709, a group of the brotherhood moved to Nevesinje.

=== Dakovići ===
The Dakovići were originally a part of the Vujačići Brotherhood, Prince Dako is the Progenitor and ancestor of Pero, Jakov and Anto Daković, However, in the 1700s the Grahovo Prince Dako Vujačić was killed due to his collaboration with the Ottomans. The Dakovići formed by taking the patronymic name of Dako Vujačić.

=== Bulajići ===
The Bulajići descend from the Progenitor of the brotherhood, named Boroje. His origins are from the Kuči tribe, Boroje killed a Turk and after the Ottomans captured Medun, Kuči in 1457 he fled to Čevo which had not been conquered yet. Boroje married a person from Čevo along with his family. He had to flee Čevo as well and went to Grahovo Field since it had a better economy. Dragoje died early fighting the Turks, leaving his wife to raise his kids. Dragoje's wife was named Bula leaving their kids to be named Bulina Djeca (Bula's Kids) or Bulići with the successor Bulajići as a matronym.

=== Vučetići ===
The Vučetići have the same origin as the Vujačići and Bulajići, Hailing from the Kuči tribe with their Progenitor being Dragoje, Luka settled in the area of Nudo near Grahovo and Zaslap, Later on in Vilusi as well.

== See also ==
- Grahovo Region
- Anto Daković
