= Radul of Riđani =

- Born: Sanjak of Herzegovina
- Other names: Radule, Raduo
- Occupation: priest of Serbian Orthodox Church
- Years active: fl. 1650–66
- Known for: chieftain of Riđani

Radul of Riđani (Serbian: Радул из Риђана; fl. 1650–66) was a Serbian Orthodox priest and chieftain (knez) of Riđani, a tribe in Old Herzegovina (later annexed by the Principality of Montenegro). He was also influential among the Banjani and Nikšići tribes.

Radul hailed from the tribe of Riđani (at the time part of the Sanjak of Herzegovina), and was a priest in Dvrsno (now Dragalj, in Krivošije). In the spring of 1650 the Riđani, including Radul, suffered from their neighbours in the Bay of Kotor, namely from the Orahovčani and Dobroćani and Đuro Vučinić.

Radul used to write letters to the authorities of Perast to inform them about the preparations of Ottoman forces for the Battle of Perast. Thanks to Radul Perast authorities were able to hide civilians into shelters before the battle. Fourteen letters written by Radul are preserved in contemporary archives.

In one of his letters written in 1661 to Vicko Mažarović, captain of Perast, Radul presented information about Ali Paša Čengić and his intention to build a new town (modern-day Kolašin in Montenegro). In 1666 Jusuf-aga Rizvanagić wrote to Bolizza, Venetian provveditore of Kotor, that Radul will carry their letters because he was the only secure person for this task.

== Sources ==
- Ekmečić, Milorad (1995). Recuel de l'histoire de Bosnie et Herzegovine. SANU.
- Kovijanić, Risto; Mijušković, Slavko; Vuković, Čedo (1966). Prednjegoševsko doba. Grafički zavod.
- Stanojević, Gligor (1970). Tadić, Jorjo (ed.). Jugoslovenske zemlje u mletačko-turskim ratovima XVI-XVIII vijeka. Belgrade: Istorijski institut.
- Stanojević, Gligor; Vasić, Milan (1975). Istorija Crne Gore (3): od početka XVI do kraja XVIII vijeka. Titograd: Redakcija za istoriju Crne Gore. OCLC 799489791.
- Historijski institut u Dubrovniku (1952). Anali. Vol. 1. Historijski institut u Dubrovniku.
