= Pero Tomov Petrović-Njegoš =

Montenegrin politician

Vojvoda Pero Tomov Petrović-Njegoš
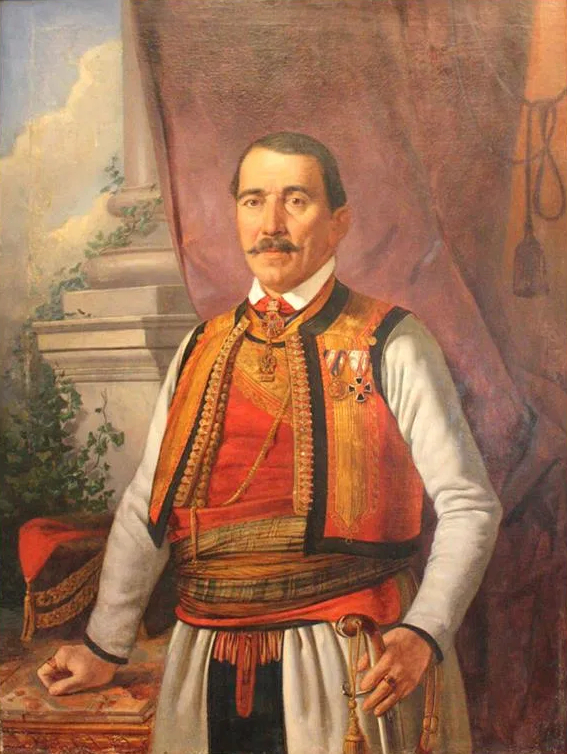

President of the Governing Senate of Montenegro and the Highlands
- In office 1834–1853
- Monarch: Petar II
- Preceded by: Ivan Vukotić
- Succeeded by: Đorđije Petrović-Njegoš

Personal details
- Born: 1800 Njeguši, Prince-Bishopric of Montenegro
- Died: 1854 (aged 53–54) Cattaro, Austrian Empire

Vojvoda Pero Tomov Petrović-Njegoš (Serbian Cyrillic: Перо Томов Петровић-Његош; 1800–1854) was a Montenegrin politician, president of the Governing senate of Montenegro and elder brother of Montenegrin prince-bishop Petar II Petrović-Njegoš.

In 1834, he replaced Ivan Vukotić as the president of the administrative senate of Montenegro. Before he died in 1851, prince-bishop Petar II named his nephew Danilo as his successor. According to some historians Peter II himself was most likely preparing ground for the new ruler of Montenegro to be a secular leader. However, when Peter II died, the Governing senate, under influence of vojvoda Đorđije Petrović-Njegoš, the wealthiest Montenegrin at the time, proclaimed Petar II's elder brother Pero Tomov as Prince of Montenegro (not Vladika). Nevertheless, in a brief struggle for power, Pero Tomov, who commanded the support of the Governing senate, lost to the much younger Danilo who had much more support among people.

Prior to the determination of Petar II successor, after being recognized by the all Montenegrin tribes, Danilo II took Pero Tomov and his supporters by surprise. Thus somewhat unexpectedly, Danilo II became the first secular Prince of Montenegro and Pero Tomov conceded defeat by returning to his position as president of the Governing senate. Pero Tomov was replaced as president in 1853 by his cousin Đorđije Petrović-Njegoš.
