= Ivan Vukotić =

Montenegrin vojvoda, diplomat and politician

Ivan Vukotić (Serbian Cyrillic: Иван Вукотић) was a Montenegrin vojvoda, diplomat, politician and the first head of the Governing senate of Montenegro and the Highlands, established in 1831, during the reign of prince-bishop Petar II Petrović-Njegoš.

In 1831, Vukotić was appointed one of the 16 Montenegrin senators. in January 1832 he was elected president of this body, and Matija Vučićević vice-president. Both Vukotić and Vučićević, although ethnic Montenegrins, were Russian citizens.

In early 1834, Vukotić and Vučićević were removed from their positions, after disagreements with the Montenegrin ruler Petar II Petrović-Njegoš. Vukotić was replaced as president by Peter II's brother Pero Tomov Petrović-Njegoš.
