= Đorđije Petrović-Njegoš =

Montenegrin vojvoda, politician

Vojvoda Đorđije Savov Petrović-Njegoš
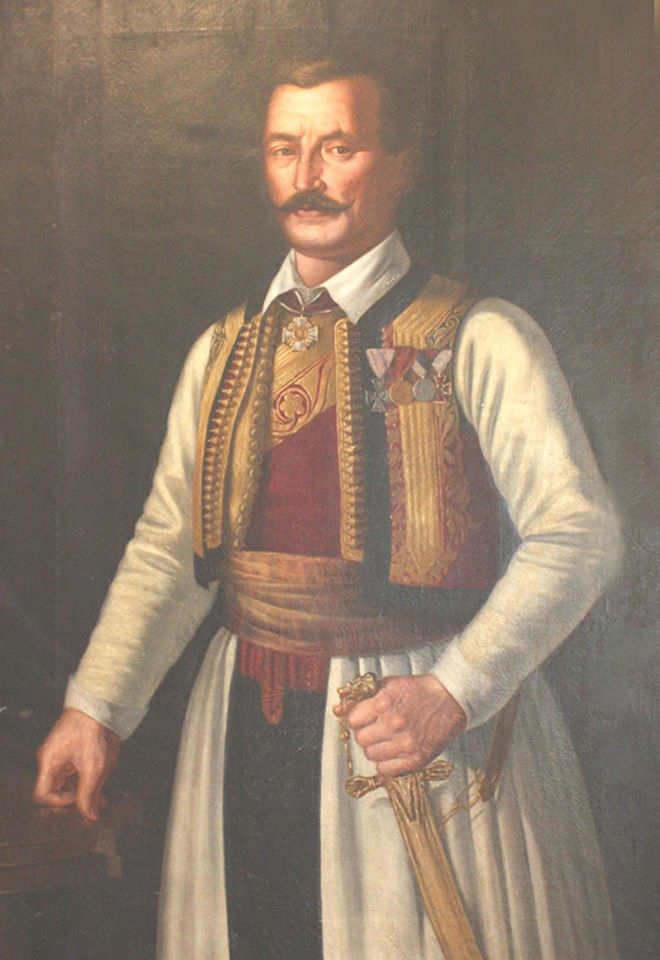

President of the Governing Senate of Montenegro and the Highlands
- In office 1854–1857
- Monarch: Danilo I
- Preceded by: Pero Tomov Petrović-Njegoš
- Succeeded by: Mirko Petrović-Njegoš

Đorđije Savov Petrović-Njegoš (Serbian Cyrillic: Ђорђије Савов Петровић-Његош) was a Montenegrin vojvoda, politician and president of the Governing senate of Montenegro and the Highlands during the reign of his cousin prince Danilo II.

Đorđije Savov was known as the wealthiest person of his time in the Old Montenegro. As the member of the ruling House of Petrović-Njegoš, he was vice-president of the governing senate of Montenegro, from 1834 until 1853, when he replaced his cousin Pero Tomov Petrović-Njegoš as the new president. He served as president of the senate until 1857, when he was succeeded by vojvoda Mirko Petrović-Njegoš.
