= Lake Grahovo =

Lake in Montenegro

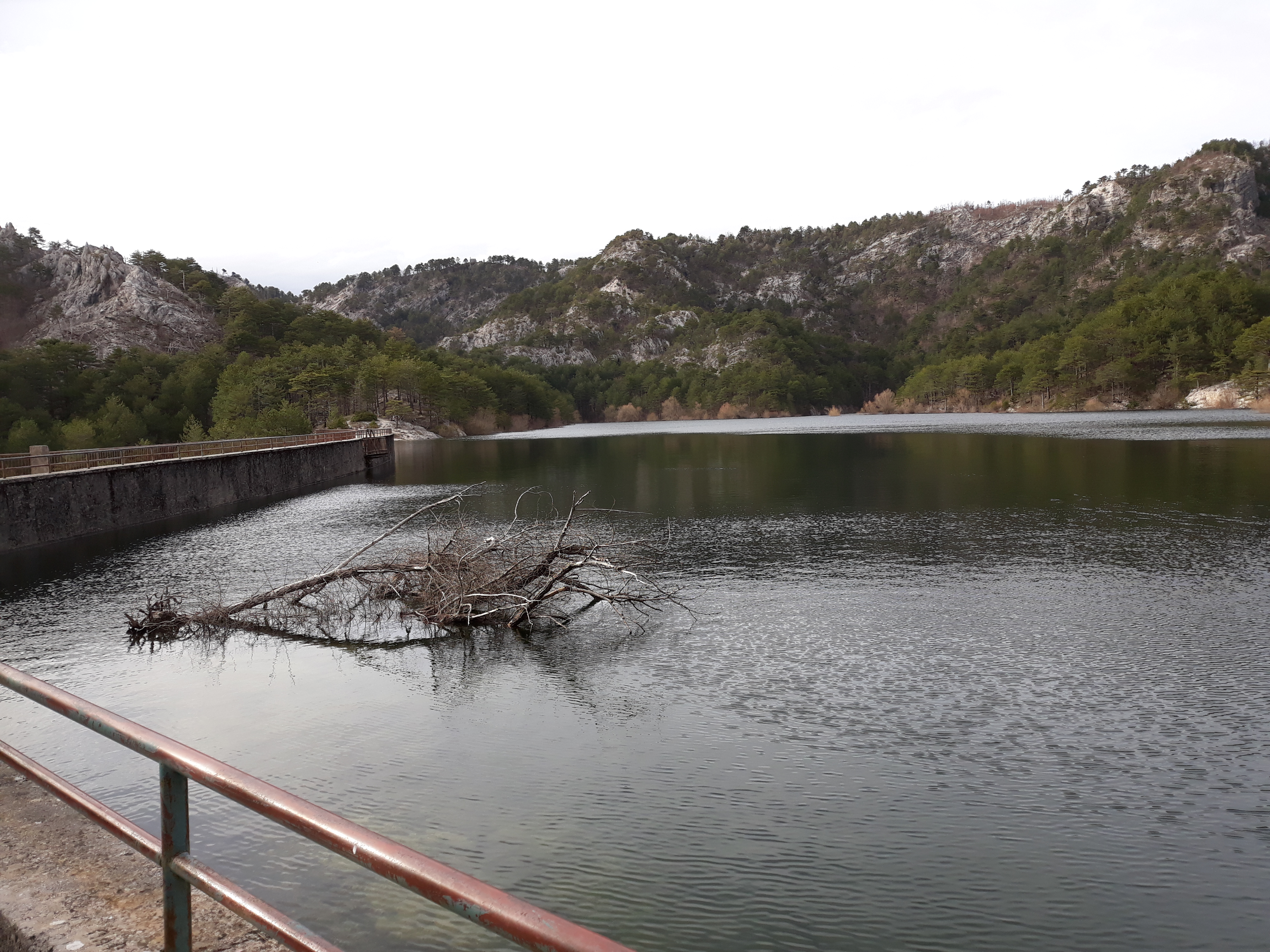

- Location within Montenegro
- Location: Grahovo
- Coordinates: 42°40′15″N 18°37′48″E
- Basin countries: Montenegro
- Max. length: 700 metres (2,300 ft)
- Max. width: 200 metres (660 ft)
- Max. depth: 25 metres (82 ft)
- Surface elevation: 788 metres (2,585 ft)

Lake Grahovo (Montenegrin: Граховско језеро, Grahovsko jezero) is a lake in Nikšić municipality, near the town of Grahovo in southwestern Montenegro.

It is an artificial lake which is an accumulation of the Grahovo River. Bottom of the lake is mostly dolomite-based. The lake itself is 700 meters long, 200 meters wide and 25 meters deep. The dam is 30 metres high, and three meters wide. The lake is a significant water reservoir used for the agricultural production of Grahovo, but is also used for sport and recreation. Construction of the dam was initiated in 1952, finished in 1962, while it has undergone a reconstruction in 1988.

The source of the lake is in the area of Ševrljuga

== See also ==
- Grahovo, Nikšić
- Grahovac, Nikšić

== Literature ==
Vujačić, Marko (1990). Crnogorski i Hercegovački Junaci.
