= Onogošt (župa) =

Onogošt (Serbian Cyrillic: Оногошт) was a medieval county (župa) part of the Kingdom of Serbia, corresponding to the Nikšić field (Nikšićko polje). The most important remains of a medieval fortified town (grad) in the area is the Bedem fortress. Some derive the Latin name Anagastum from Gothic. It was mentioned in the Chronicle of the Priest of Duklja (ca. 1300–10) as one of the counties part of Podgorje. With the Ottoman conquest, the county was transformed into the Nikšić tribe and nahiya.

== Sources ==
- Dinić, Mihailo (1978). Ćirković, Sima M. (ed.). Српске земље у средњем веку: историјско-географске студије. Српска књижевна задруга.
- Ivanović, Zdravko (1977). Nikšić: urbano-geografska studija. SANU, Geografski institut "Jovan Cvijić".
- Mišić, Siniša (2010). "Оногошт". Лексикон градова и тргова средњовековних српских земаља: према писаним изворима. Завод за уџбенике. ISBN 978-86-17-16604-3.
