= Battle of Grahovac =

Battle

Coordinates: 42.6878°N 18.6114°E

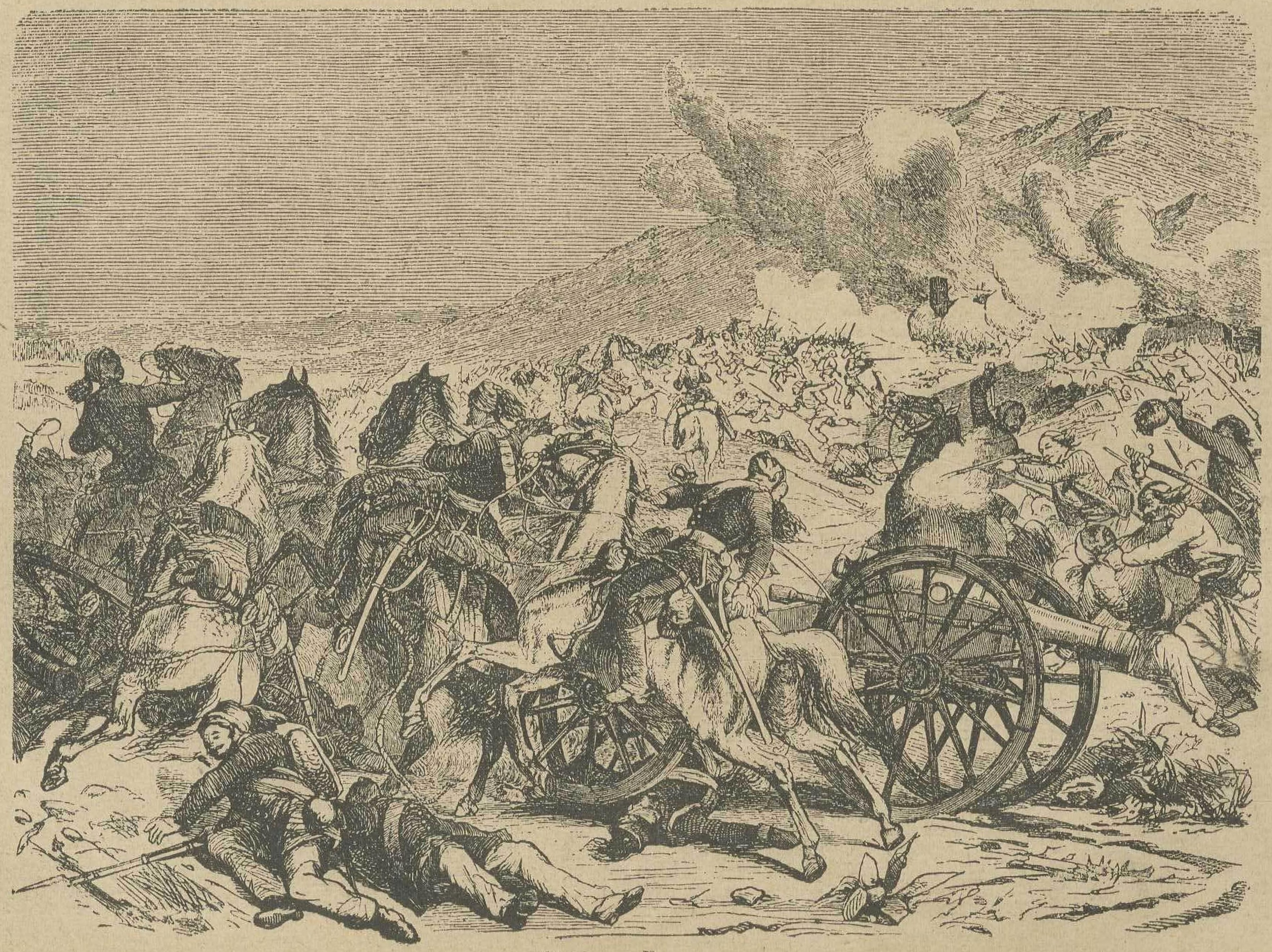
Date	11 – 13 May 1858
Location	Grahovac, Montenegro
Result	Montenegrin victory

Belligerents
Montenegro	Ottoman Empire

Commanders and leaders
Mirko Petrović-Njegoš	Hüseyin Avni Pasha; Kadri Pasha †

Strength
4,000	7,000–13,000

Casualties and losses
1,000	5,000

The Battle of Grahovac took place in the eponymous village of Grahovac from 11 to 13 May 1858, when the Montenegrin Grand Duke Mirko Petrović-Njegoš led the army of Principality of Montenegro against the Ottomans, ending in a decisive Montenegrin victory. After the victory, the demarcation of the border between Montenegro and the Ottoman Bosnia Eyalet was finalised. A considerable arsenal of war trophies was captured following the retreat of the Ottoman army.

== Background ==
On 10 May 1858, the Ottoman commander Hussein Pasha captured the villages of Vilusi and Grahovo and continued his advance towards Grahovac, a small village located on a plateau elevated slightly above the captured area. The core of Montenegrin resistance was in Grahovac, which was the main bastion of Montenegrin defence according to military plans.

== Battle ==
The fighting itself started on May 11, early in the morning. The Ottomans attacked Grahovac while Montenegrins were stubbornly defending, determined not to retreat at any cost. Most of 3,000 Ottoman and 1,000 Montenegrin casualties were made on that day. On May 12, Hussein Pasha offered a truce to Montenegrin commander-in-chief Grand Duke Mirko Petrović-Njegoš, but he refused it, although he did allow the Ottomans time to bury their dead. He also refused to send men to disrupt the Ottomans supply of water. Although this would have given him a tactical advantage, he considered it a dishonourable move.

On May 13, the decisive battle started as the Ottomans got military support from Bosnia. But this time, the Montenegrins took charge and attacked the Ottomans, forcing them into successive retreats. The biggest problem for the Montenegrins was a well-armed Ottoman artillery, which was constantly bombarding their positions with cannons. Eventually, the Montenegrins decided to charge across the battlefield and take over the cannons. After they saw two of the commanders, the Serdar (Count) Đuro Kusovac and the priest Luka Jovović, being killed while charging, the rest of the Montenegrin troops, including the guardsmen, began a rapid advance with a shout: "Forward, to avenge our commanders". The offensive was successful, and by capturing Ottoman cannons, the Montenegrins had officially won the battle.

== Aftermath ==
This major victory had had even more diplomatic significance. The glory of Montenegrin weapons was soon immortalised in the songs and literature of all the South Slavs, in particular the Serbs in Vojvodina, then part of Austria-Hungary. This Montenegrin victory forced the Great Powers to officially demarcate the borders between Montenegro and Ottoman Empire, de facto recognizing Montenegro's centuries-long independence. Montenegro gained Grahovo, Rudine, Nikšići, more than half of Drobnjaci, Tušina, Uskoci, Lipovo, Upper Vasojevići, and part of Kuči and Dodoši.

Prince Danilo granted all of the battle survivors the "Grahovo medal", and Mirko Petrović-Njegoš was proclaimed "Grand Duke of Grahovo". In 1864 King Nicholas I built the Church of the Ascension on the site of Hussein Pasha's headquarters, and in 2008, the Montenegrin government revealed an obelisk which honours the battle and its participants. Both on the church and the obelisk read the famous quotation from Petar II Petrović-Njegoš's The Mountain Wreath: The monument to your bravery is Montenegro and its freedom.

== Restaurant ==
Established in 2020, is a hotel and restaurant called Hotel Grahovac 1858 situated on the side of the P11 road. It offers both Jeep and Kayak tours of the neighboring landscape.

== Gallery ==
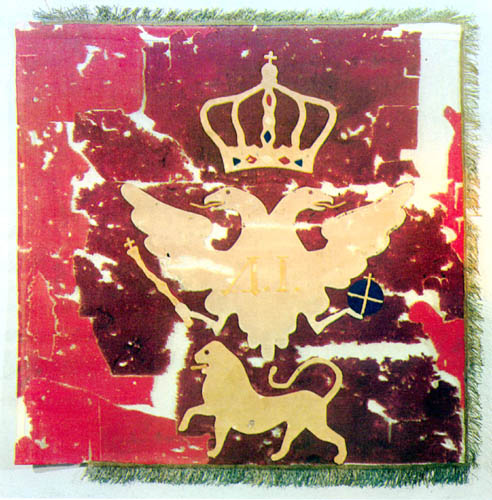
Flag used by the Montenegrin army in the Battle of Grahovac

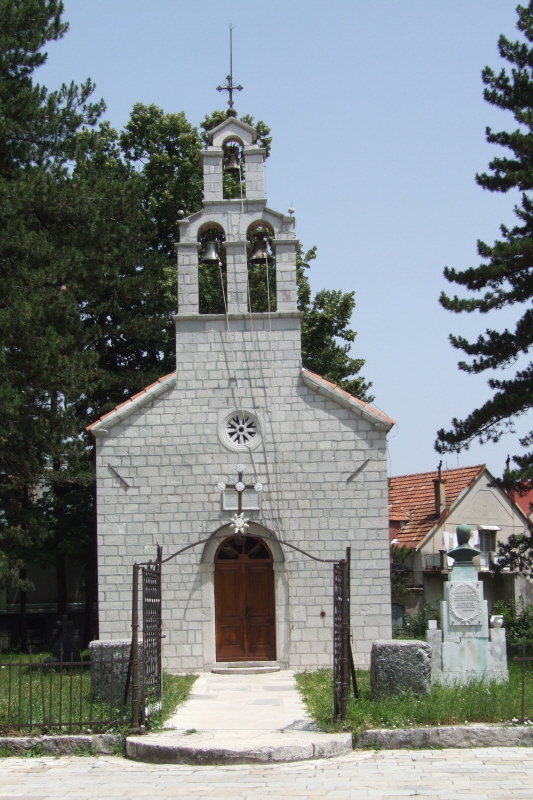
A rail guard of the Vlach Church in Cetinje was built of captured Ottoman rifle barrels in the Battle of Grahovac

Veterans of the Battle of Grahovac photographed at the celebration of its 50th anniversary (1908)

== Sources ==
- Banović, Branko (2016). The Montenegrin warrior tradition. Questions and Controversies over NATO membership. New York: Palgrave Macmillan. ISBN 978-1-349-57657-9.
- Pavićević, Branko (1990). Danilo I Petrović Njegoš, knjaz crnogorski i brdski, 1851-1860 [Danilo I Petrović-Njegoš, the prince of Montenegro and the Highlands]. Književne novine. ISBN 9788649503434.
- Pavićević, Branko (2007). Sazdanje crnogorske nacionalne države: 1796-1878 [The Creation of Montenegrin nation state: 1796-1878]. CID. ISBN 9788639102029.
- Batrićević, Đuro (2010). Obavještajna služba u Grahovačkoj bici [Intelligence in the Battle of Grahovac]. Montenegrina.
- Roberts, Elizabeth (2007). Realm of the Black Mountain. Hurst. ISBN 978-1850658689.
