= Anto Daković =

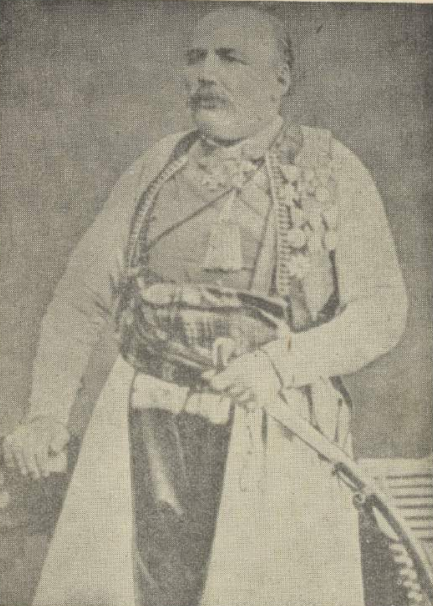
- Picture of Vojvoda Anto Daković
- Born: 1823; Grahovo
- Died: March 9, 1889 (aged 65–66); Cetinje
- Resting place: Grahovo
- Title: Grand Duke of Grahovo

Anto Daković (1823–1889) was the Grand Duke of Grahovo and a senator in the Prince-Bishopric of Montenegro.

== Personal life ==
Daković was born in 1823 in the area of Grahovo. His family hailed from the Vujačić brotherhood, after taking the patronymic name of Dako Vujačić, the Grahovo Prince which was slain by his fellow tribesmen for his collaboration with the Ottomans. His brotherhood descended from a fleeing member of the Kuči tribe. His father was Grahovo prince Jakov Daković, who chose in 1834 to annex the Grahovo region to Montenegro. Anto Daković had 2 sons, Perko (Pero) and Jakša (Jakov). According to Lazar Tomanović, Anto's last son, Perko, died in his youth on Easter of 1885, leaving one male kid in the cradle.

== Education ==
Anto finished primary school in the town Risan.

== Military career ==
In 1853, his father died. Omer Pasha besieged the cave (Demirovi) for 6 days near their tower by a military company. They were detained and brought to Mostar for fraud. His father died near Klobuk during the night, and Anto and his colleagues were imprisoned until Montenegro made peace with Omer Pasha. Grahovo residents dug up his father and buried him near the Grahovo church. Prince Danilo awarded him with a prestigious Russian decoration for his performance in the wars of 1852–1853 against the army of Omer-pasha. In 1857, He was elected Grand Duke of Grahovo. He fought in the Battle of Grahovac in 1858, as well as in the insurgency.
