= Grahovac, Montenegro =

Grahovac Граховац
- Village
- Location within Montenegro
- Coordinates: 42°41′16″N 18°36′41″E
- Country: Montenegro
- Municipality: Nikšić
- Elevation: 945 m (3,100 ft)

Population (2011)
  - Total: 117
- Time zone: UTC+1 (CET)
  - Summer (DST): UTC+2 (CEST)
- Area code: +382 40

Grahovac (Montenegrin Cyrillic: Граховац) is a village in western Montenegro, in the municipality of Nikšić. The village is located on a karst plateau overlooking the Grahovo field and Lake Grahovo. According to the 2011 census, it had 117 inhabitants, vast majority of which are ethnic Montenegrins.

== History ==
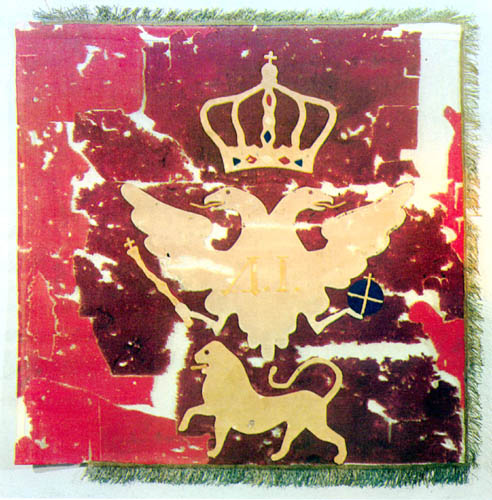
Flag used by the Montenegrin army in the Battle of Grahovac (1858)

The village is best known as the location of the Battle of Grahovac in 1858, in which Montenegro defeated the Ottoman forces, resulting in mutual redefinition and recognition of respective country borders. In order to honour the battle, prince-bishop Nikola I built the Church of the Ascension (Crkva Svetog Spasa) in 1864 at the exact place where Ottoman commander Hussein Pasha's tent has been set up during the battle, overlooking Lake Grahovo.

In 1958, as a part of the celebration of the centenary of the battle, the church has been decorated with a memorial plaque dedicated to the fallen fighters, reading "The monument to your bravery is Montenegro and its freedom". An obelisk monument honouring the battle and its participants, bearing the same inscription, was built on the outskirts of the village by the Government of Montenegro in 2008.

== Demographics ==
Ethnicity in 2011
| Ethnicity | Number | Percentage |
|---|---|---|
| Montenegrins | 91 | 77.8% |
| Serbs | 24 | 20.5% |
| undeclared | 2 | 1.7% |
| Total | 117 | 100% |

Language in 2011
| Language | Number | Percentage |
|---|---|---|
| Montenegrin | 76 | 65% |
| Serbian | 37 | 31.6% |
| undeclared | 4 | 3.4% |
| Total | 117 | 100% |

== See also ==
- Grahovo
- Battle of Grahovac
