= Gornje Lipovo =

Village in Kolašin, Montenegro

Coordinates: 42°52′17.1″N 19°25′23.8″E

Gornje Lipovo (Montenegrin Cyrillic: Липово) is a village in northern Montenegro, in Kolašin Municipality. It has a population of about 250 people.

Lipovo is well known in Montenegro for its cold-water springs, green forests and rivers which are full of fish.

== History ==
During World War II, Lipovo was an important place for The Yugoslav Army in the Fatherland, and for their leader Draža Mihailović, as he used to hide in this Montenegrin village.

== Sources ==
- Pavlowitch, Stevan K. (2007). Hitler's New Disorder: The Second World War in Yugoslavia. New York: Columbia University Press. ISBN 978-1-85065-895-5.
- Roberts, Walter R. (1973). Tito, Mihailović and the Allies: 1941–1945. New Brunswick, New Jersey: Duke University Press. ISBN 978-0-8223-0773-0.
