= Mirko Petrović-Njegoš =

Grand Duke of Grahovo from 1857 to 1867

Mirko Petrović-Njegoš Grand Duke of Grahovo
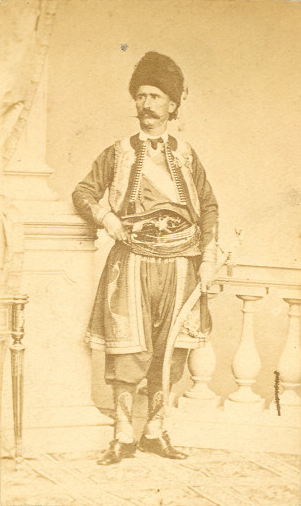
- Vojvoda Mirko, c. 1860

3rd Head of Senate of Montenegro and the Highlands
- In office 18 February 1857 – 1 August 1867
- Monarchs: Danilo I Nicholas I
- Preceded by: Đorđije Petrović-Njegoš
- Succeeded by: Božo Petrović-Njegoš

Personal details
- Born: 19 August 1820 Njeguši, Montenegro
- Died: 1 August 1867 (aged 46) Cetinje, Principality of Montenegro
- Spouse: Anastasija Stana Martinović (m. 1840)
- Issue: Nikola I Petrović-Njegoš; Princess Anastasia; Princess Maria
- House: Petrović-Njegoš
- Father: Stanko Petrović-Njegoš
- Mother: Krstinja Vrbica
- Occupation: Military commander, politician, poet

Mirko Petrović-Njegoš (Serbian Cyrillic: Мирко Петровић-Његош; 19 August 1820 – 1 August 1867) was a Montenegrin military commander, politician and poet, belonging to the House of Petrović-Njegoš. He was given the title of veliki vojvoda (Grand Duke) of Grahovo, and is thus also known as Vojvoda Mirko (Duke Mirko). He was the father of Nikola, the future ruler of Montenegro.

== Life ==
Mirko was born on 19 August 1820, in Njeguši, the son of Stanko Petrović-Njegoš and wife Krstinja Vrbica. He was the older brother of Prince Danilo I, while his uncle was Petar II Petrović-Njegoš. He is famous for winning the Battle of Grahovac on 1 May 1858, leading the Montenegrin army against the Ottomans. During this time he led a campaign against the Kuči tribe where 243 people were massacred, the majority old men, women and children. However, historians do not agree on the number of victims and some point out that the atrocity might have been exaggerated by chieftain Marko Miljanov. Members of the Kuči had refused to obey orders from the Petrović dynasty.

In 1862, after the Convention of Scutari, he was deported because he had fought against the Ottomans.

His epic corpus Junački spomenik (Heroic Monument), published in the Montenegrin capital of Cetinje in 1864, glorifies Montenegro and Montenegrins, and tells of the great victories over the Ottoman Empire.

He was married in Njeguši on 7 November [O.S. 26 October] 1840 to Anastasia Martinović (Bajice, 27 June [O.S. 15 June] 1824 – Cetinje, 23 December [O.S. 11 December] 1894), daughter of Vojevoda Drago Martinović and wife Stana Martinović.

They had three children:

- Nikola (7 October [O.S. 25 September] 1841 – March 1, 1921)
- Princess Anastasia (d. March 29, 1879), married to Savo Plamenac
- Princess Maria, married to Capt. Y. Gopcević.

In February 1857, vojvoda Mirko Petrović-Njegoš replaced his cousin Đorđije Petrović-Njegoš as the President of the Governing Senate of Montenegro and the Highlands, he served during the reign of his brother prince Danilo I and later during the reign of his son prince Nicholas. He held the position of president until his death in August 1867.

== Legacy ==
He is a controversial figure in Montenegro, where he is seen as a symbol of "Montenegrin identity, pride and statehood" by many, while others hold him responsible for the deaths of thousands of innocent civilians. A monument in his honor was erected in 1862 in Podgorica by his son, King Nikola, but demolished in 1919 after the dethronement of the Petrović dynasty. In 2017, a new monument was erected in the city, which was met with protest by ethnic Serbs, particularly those whose origins are traced back to the Kuči.

== Work ==
His writings include this book of poetry owned by the Library of Congress in Washington, DC:

- Junački spomenik (1951; 185 pages) LCCN: 55037918 Call number: PG1418.P53 J8

== See also ==
- Battle of Grahovac
