= Haraç =

Land tax levied on non-Muslims in the Ottoman Empire

Haraç (Armenian: խարջ, romanized: kharj, Macedonian: арач, romanized: arač, Greek: χαράτσι, romanized: charatsi, Serbo-Croatian: харач, harač) was a land tax levied on non-Muslim subjects in the Ottoman Empire.

Haraç was developed from an earlier form of land taxation, kharaj (Turkish: harac), and was, in principle, only payable by non-Muslims; it was seen as a counterpart to zakat ("charity") paid by Muslims. The haraç system later merged into the cizye taxation system. While the taxes collected from non Muslims were higher than those collected from Muslims, the rights and opportunities provided to non-Muslims were much more limited. It often incentivised people to convert to Islam.

Haraç collection was reformed by a firman (decree) of 1834, which abolished the old levying system, and required that haraç be raised by a commission composed of the kadı (judge and administrator) and the ayans, or municipal chiefs of rayas in each district. The firman made several other changes to taxation as part of the wider Tanzimat reform movement within the Ottoman Empire.

== Sources ==
- Halil İnalcık; Suraiya Faroqhi; Donald Quataert (28 April 1997). An Economic and Social History of the Ottoman Empire. Cambridge University Press. ISBN 978-0-521-57455-6.
- Benjamin Braude; Bernard Lewis (1982). Christians and Jews in the Ottoman Empire: The central lands. v. 2. The Arabic-speaking lands. Holmes & Meier Publishers. ISBN 978-0-8419-0519-1.
- Bruce McGowan (1981). Economic Life in Ottoman Europe: Taxation, Trade, and the Struggle for Land, 1600-1800. Cambridge University Press. ISBN 978-0-521-24208-0.
