= Banjani =

Tribe in western Montenegro

Banjani (Serbian Cyrillic: Бањани) was a tribe in Old Herzegovina, and historical region in western Montenegro. Its territory comprises 380 km^{2} (150 sq mi), west of Nikšić, in the centre between Nikšić and Bileća, from the top of Njegoš mountain to the Trebišnjica river, and on to the Bileća Lake. All Banjani families have Jovanjdan (St. John's feast day, January 20) as their slava (a Serbian Orthodox tradition).

== History ==
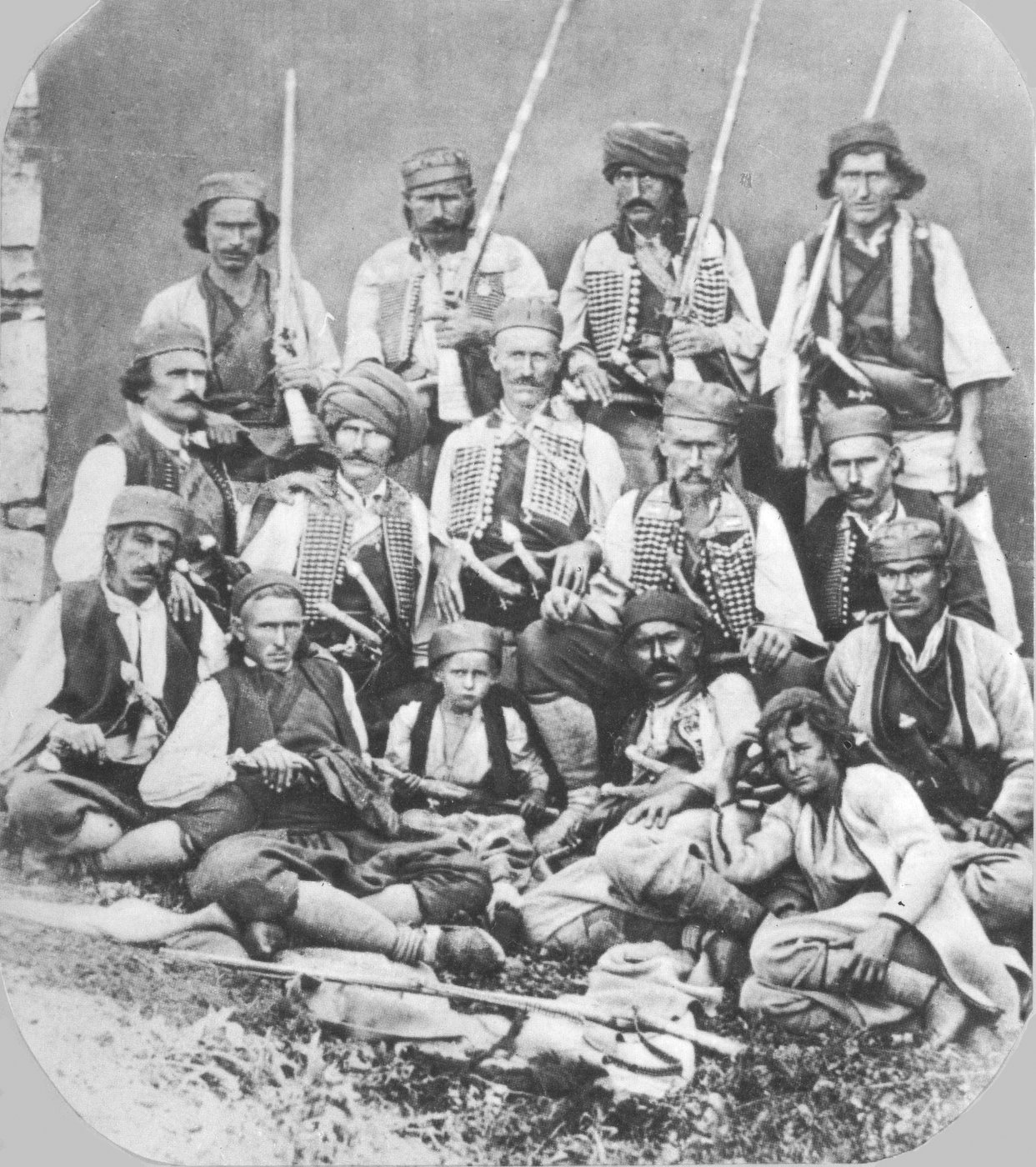
Peasants of the Banjani, ca. 1860

The first written mention of the Banjani is in 1319. Some scholars argued that the name could derive from balnea (sr. banja), which means "bath" or "spa". According to oral tradition, the tribal name comes from Banjska in Kosovo from where they migrated. The Novljani were a medieval Serb community, which became a component part of the Drobnjaci tribe in Old Herzegovina (in Montenegro). According to folklore, the Novljani settled Bosnia at the time of the Serb settlement in the Balkans, then later crossed into the Banjani plateau in Old Herzegovina. From there, the Novljani and other Serb tribes pushed out the native population towards the Tara and source of Morača, and towards the south, Podgorica, and then settled and divided the conquered lands between themselves. The Novljani received the wide land that later encompassed the tribes of Banjani and Drobnjaci.

Sir Arthur Evans noted that the Banjani were mentioned as Vlachs in Herzegovina and Montenegro of the Middle Ages in Ragusan reports and Serbian chrysobulls. In Herzegovina were situated on the territory of Jezera and Piva. At the end of 14th century katunar (head of the tribe) was Jurek Junaković, later Herak Draženović of Radovan (1412), a certain Nenad (1432), and so on. Initially vassals of Pavlović (1430), in 1444 and 1463 they were recorded as vassals of Stjepan Vukčić Kosača. They are mentioned in mid-15th century documents from the Bay of Kotor.

At the time of the Ottoman occupation in 1466, the Banjani became part of southeastern Sanjak of Herzegovina. During occupation many Vlachs, including from Banjani, collaborated with the Ottomans as slave agents.

In Jovan Radonjić's letter from 1789. to Queen Catherine II. in asking for support from Empress of Russia for the Serbs from different tribes and regions, Banjani were also included.

== Banjani society ==
According to ethnologists, the basic cell for the development of the tribe was the katun. The semi-nomadic people bred cattle in the summer on the mountain in the summer pasture and in the winter in the rural village on the bay. These cattle were inherited from Vlachs, Romans, Illyrians and other Balkan natives. One pasture would serve about 20 houses, and families were headed by katunar.

== Notable people ==
- Novak Kilibarda, Montenegrin politician and writer, born in Banjani
- Mirko Kovač, Yugoslav writer, born in Petrovići
- Miljan Miljanić, Yugoslav footballer, coach and administrator, family from Banjani
- Jorge Capitanich, Argentine politician, by paternal descent

== See also ==
- Grahovljani, Historical region
- Vlachs in medieval Bosnia and Herzegovina
- Montenegrin clans
