= Nikšići (tribe) =

The Nikšići (Montenegrin Cyrillic: Никшићи) was one of the historical tribes in the Ottoman Sanjak of Herzegovina, constituting the Nikšić nahija. It was part of Old Herzegovina, that in 1858 was de facto incorporated into the Principality of Montenegro. The Nikšići appear in the historical record during the end of the 14th century.

== Name ==
The name Nikšići is the plural of Nikšić, a Slavic patronym derived from Nikša, the likely founder of the tribe. Nikša is a hypocoristic of Nikola and was common during the Middle Ages in the littoral cities of Zeta and Dalmatia, especially in Dubrovnik. The variant Nikša may derive from the Albanian diminutive Niksh which produced Nikšić with the Slavic suffix -ić.

== History ==
The Nikšići are mentioned alongside numerous Montenegrin and Herzegovinian tribes in the 14th and 15th century archives from Dubrovnik and Kotor. While most of them are only described as katuns, the Nikšići themselves are explicitly referred to as Vlachs (social class). The first reference to the tribe in historical records comes from a letter from Ragusan merchants to Jelena Balšić dated 6 August 1399, where they are mentioned as Vlachs (vlasi nikšiki). Around the same time they are also mentioned as "Nikšić of Zeta" (Nichsich de Zenta) in documents from Kotor. In 1447 it was reported that they had captured a Ragusan messenger and sold him to the Turks. In 1455 they are listed among tribes and villages in Zeta who signed an agreement with Venetians in Vranjina.

The tribe was led by the vojvoda, which had been established after conflicts within the tribe as a compromise. They simultaneously used the name Onogošti until 17th century and further.

The burning of Saint Sava's remains after the Banat Uprising provoked Serbs to revolt in other regions against the Ottomans. Grdan, the vojvoda of Nikšić, organized revolt with Serbian Patriarch Jovan Kantul. In 1596, an uprising broke out in Bjelopavlići, then spread to Drobnjaci, Nikšići, Piva and Gacko (see: Serb Uprising of 1596–97). It was suppressed due to a lack of foreign support.

== Legacy ==
According to oral tradition, collected by the Serbian historian Petar Šobajić, the tribe dates back to the 14th century and is named after Nikša, who was the son of Ilijan, the ban of Grbalj, and who was maternally a Nemanjić. Expanding on this, Risto Kovijanić said that Nikša may have moved from lands around the Morača monastery to the župa of Onogošt after the death of the Serbian prince Stefan Vukanović Nemanjić (fl. 1252), his relative. It is considered that the tribe was not founded by a single individual, but by several related families led by Nikša. The Nikšići found native tribes in their new territory: in the west were the Riđani (the strongest tribe), in the župa itself were the Lužani, while in the north, by the mountains Vojnik and Durmitor were the Drobnjaci. The Nikšići were a very strong tribe, having successfully conquered the Lužani and pushed back the border of the Drobnjaci territory, while tradition speaks of many conflicts between them and the Riđani. In the 16th century, the Nikšići and the Riđani were the only tribes still present in the area.

== Sources ==
- Detelić, Mirjana (2007). Epski gradovi. Leksikon [Epic Cities. A lexicon]. Belgrade: Balkanološkog instituta SANU. ISBN 9788671790406..
- Gashi, Skënder (2015). Kërkime onomastike-historike për minoritete të shuara e aktuale të Kosovës [Onomastic-historical research on extinct and actual minorities of Kosova] (PDF) (in Albanian). Pristina: Akademia e Shkencave dhe e Arteve e Kosovës. ISBN 9789951615488.
- Grković, Milica (1986). Rečnik imena Banjskog, Dečanskog i Prizrenskog vlastelinstva u XIV veku [Dictionary of names of the Banjska, Dečani and Prizren estates in the 14th century] (in Serbian). Belgrade: Narodna knjiga. ISBN 9788633100243.
- Kovijanić, Risto (1974). Pomeni crnogorskih plemena u kotorskim spomenicima (XIV–XVI vijek) [Mentions of Montenegrin tribes in Kotor records (14th–16th centuries)] (in Serbian). Vol. II. Titograd: Istorijski institut SR Crne Gore.
- Oruç, Hatice (2012). "Nahija Limski Nikšići u granicama Bosanskog i Hercegovačkog sandžaka u 15. i 16. stoljeću" [The Nahiyah of Limski Nikšići within the Boundaries of the Bosnian and Herzegovinian Sanjak in the 15th and 16th centuries]. Historijska traganja (in Bosnian). 10: 155–180.
- Šekularac, Božidar (2015). "Uticaj Vlaha na formiranje i razvoj crnogorskih plemena" [Impact of Vlachs on formation and development of Montenegrin tribes] (PDF). Arhivski Zapisi (in Serbian). XXII (1). Cetinje: Državni arhiv Crne Gore: 9–26.
- Bataković, Dušan T. (1996). The Serbs of Bosnia & Herzegovina: History and Politics. Dialogue Association. ISBN 9782911527104.
