= Grahovo, Nikšić =

Grahovo Грахово
- Location within Montenegro
- Coordinates: 42°39′08″N 18°40′20″E
- Country: Montenegro
- Municipality: Nikšić
- Elevation: 720 m (2,360 ft)

Population (2011)
  - Total: 120
- Demonym(s): Singular: Grahovljanin; Plural: Grahovljani
- Time zone: UTC+1 (CET)
  - Summer (DST): UTC+2 (CEST)
- Area code: +382 40

Grahovo (Serbian Cyrillic: Грахово, pronounced [ɡrâxoʋo]) is a historical settlement in the Nikšić Municipality of northwestern Montenegro. It is located in the historical region of Grahovo.

== History ==
In 1614, Mariano Bolizza wrote that Grahovo was situated in a beautiful plain, and commanded by Mile Perin. The settlement had 90 houses, out of which 70 were Orthodox Christian, and 20 were Turkish (Muslim). The town had 200 men in arms.

On the 26th of August, 1836, After the rise of Petar II Petrović-Njegoš to power in the Prince-Bishopric of Montenegro, members of Grahovo tribe, led by vojvoda Jakov Daković refused to pay haraç to the Ottoman authorities and joined the rest of Montenegrins in guerrilla warfare in Ottoman-controlled Herzegovina, expressing the desire to unite with Montenegro. In response, Ali Pasha Rizvanbegović, vizier of Herzegovina, attacked Grahovo in 1836 and occupied the town.

Four years after the Montenegrin defeat at Grahovo, seeking revenge for the death of his brother, Njegoš plotted the assassination of Smail-aga with the assistance of the local Christians from Herzegovina who lived on the territory under Smail-aga's control. Njegoš ordered a Montenegrin tribal leader, Novica Cerović, to ambush Smail-aga Čengić, the Ottoman commander who was responsible for killing Njegoš's brother Joko.

In late September 1840, Montenegrins attracted Čengić and his army deep into their territory, organized an ambush and murdered them by attacking their camp during the night. The assault occurred in the village of Mljetičak, north of Nikšić. In the ensuing clash, Smail-aga was shot and killed, after which his severed head was brought to Cetinje. As a sign of his gratitude, Njegoš made Cerović a senator.

The town of Grahovo, although fairly small received many high positions in the Montenegrin Government, For example, Most Montenegrin Kings were titled as the "Grand Prince of Grahovo".

== Population ==
Ethnicity in 2011
Ethnicity	Number	Percentage
Montenegrins	99	82.5%
Serbs	19	15.8%
other and undeclared	2	1.7%
Total	120	100%

Language in 2011
Language	Number	Percentage
Montenegrin	82	68.4%
Serbian	31	25.8%
other and undeclared	7	5.8%
Total	120	100%

== Grand Duke of Grahovo ==
The title "Grand Duke of Grahovo", which refers to this settlement, is an honorary title held by the titular rulers of Montenegro, currently held by Boris, Hereditary Prince of Montenegro.

The holders of the title included:

- Grand Duke Mirko Petrović-Njegoš
- Prince/King Nikola I of Montenegro
- Prince Mirko Dimitri of Montenegro
- Prince Mihailo of Montenegro
- Prince Nikola of Montenegro
- Anto Daković

== See also ==
- Grahovo (region)
- Sava Kovačević
