= Second government of Lazar Tomanović =

The second government of Lazar Tomanović lasted from 2 April 1909 to 1 September 1910 (according to the old calendar).

== History ==
During this government, the Principality of Montenegro was proclaimed as Kingdom.

Government of Lazar Tomanović III
- 6th Cabinet of Principality of Montenegro
- 1909–1910
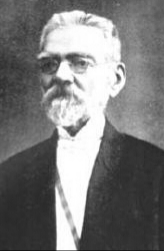
- Lazar Tomanović
- Date formed: April 15, 1909
- Date dissolved: August 28, 1910

People and organisations
- Head of state: Nicholas I
- Head of government: Lazar Tomanović
- No. of ministers: 6
- Member parties: Independent, True People's Party

History
- Predecessor: First government of Lazar Tomanović
- Successor: Second government of Lazar Tomanović

== Cabinet ==
=== Principality of Montenegro ===
Portfolio	Minister	Party	In office
Prime Minister	Lazar Tomanović	Independent	15 April 1909 – 28 August 1910
Minister of Foreign Affairs	Lazar Tomanović	Independent	15 April 1909 – 28 August 1910
Minister of Justice	Lazar Tomanović	Independent	13 April – 28 August 1910
Minister of the Interior	Lazar Tomanović	Independent	6 February – 13 April 1910
Minister of the Interior	Jovan Plamenac	True People's Party	15 April 1909 – 6 February 1910
Minister of the Interior	Jovan Plamenac	True People's Party	6 February – 28 August 1910
Minister of War	Mitar Martinović	True People's Party	15 April 1909 – 28 August 1910
Minister of Finance and Construction	Dušan Vukotić	Independent	15 April 1909 – 28 August 1910
Minister of Education and Ecclesiastical Affairs	Sekula Drljević	True People's Party	15 April 1909 – 6 February 1910
Minister of Justice	Sekula Drljević	True People's Party	15 April 1909 – 6 February 1910
Minister of Justice	Pero Vučković	Independent	23 August 1910 – 23 August 1911
Minister of Education and Ecclesiastical Affairs	Pero Vučković	Independent	6 February – 28 August 1910

Government of Lazar Tomanović III
- 1st Cabinet of Kingdom of Montenegro
- 1910
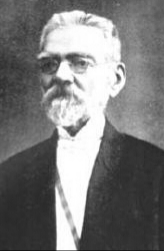
- Lazar Tomanović
- Date formed: August 28, 1910
- Date dissolved: September 14, 1910

People and organisations
- Head of state: Nicholas I
- Head of government: Lazar Tomanović
- No. of ministers: 6
- Member parties: Independent, True People's Party

History
- Predecessor: Second government of Lazar Tomanović
- Successor: Third government of Lazar Tomanović

== Cabinet ==
=== Kingdom of Montenegro ===
Portfolio	Minister	Party	In office
Prime Minister	Lazar Tomanović	Independent	28 August – 14 September 1910
Minister of Foreign Affairs	Lazar Tomanović	Independent	28 August – 14 September 1910
Minister of Justice	Lazar Tomanović	Independent	28 August – 14 September 1910
Minister of Education and Ecclesiastical Affairs	Pero Vučković	Independent	28 August – 14 September 1910
Minister of Finance and Construction	Dušan Vukotić	Independent	28 August – 14 September 1910
Minister of War	Mitar Martinović	True People's Party	28 August – 14 September 1910
Minister of the Interior	Jovan Plamenac	True People's Party	28 August – 13 September 1910
Minister of the Interior	Filip Jergović	True People's Party	13 September – 14 September 1910
