= Fourth government of Lazar Tomanović =

Government of Lazar Tomanović IV
- 4th Cabinet of Kingdom of Montenegro
- 1911–1912
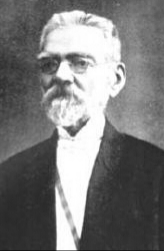
- Lazar Tomanović
- Date formed: August 23, 1911
- Date dissolved: June 19, 1912

People and organisations
- Head of state: Nicholas I
- Head of government: Lazar Tomanović
- No. of ministers: 6
- Member parties: Independent, True People's Party

History
- Election: 1911 Montenegrin parliamentary election
- Predecessor: Third government of Lazar Tomanović
- Successor: Government of Mitar Martinović

The fourth government of Lazar Tomanović lasted from 10 August 1911 to 6 June 1912 (according to the old calendar).

== Cabinet ==
Portfolio	Minister	Party	In office
Prime Minister	Lazar Tomanović	Independent	23 Augist 1911 – 19 June 1912
Minister of the Interior	Marko Đukanović	Independent	23 Augist 1911 – 19 June 1912
Minister of War	Janko Vukotić	Independent	23 Augist 1911 – 19 June 1912
Minister of Finance and Construction	Filip Jergović	True People's Party	23 Augist 1911 – 19 June 1912
Minister of Education and Ecclesiastical Affairs	Milo Dožić	Independent	23 Augist 1911 – 19 June 1912
Minister of Justice	Milo Dožić	Independent	23 Augist 1911 – 19 June 1912
Minister of Foreign Affairs	Duŝan Gregović	Independent	23 Augist 1911 – 19 June 1912
