= Third government of Lazar Tomanović =

Government of Lazar Tomanović III
- 2th Cabinet of Kingdom of Montenegro
- 1910–1911
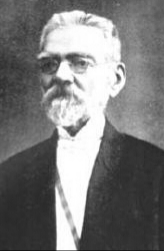
- Lazar Tomanović
- Date formed: September 14, 1910
- Date dissolved: August 23, 1911

People and organisations
- Head of state: Nicholas I
- Head of government: Lazar Tomanović
- No. of ministers: 5
- Member parties: Independent, True People's Party

History
- Predecessor: Second government of Lazar Tomanović
- Successor: Fourth government of Lazar Tomanović

The third government of Lazar Tomanović lasted from 1 September 1910 to 10 August 1911 (according to the old calendar).

== Cabinet ==
Portfolio	Minister	Party	In office
Prime Minister	Lazar Tomanović	Independent	14 September 1910 – 23 August 1911
Minister of Foreign Affairs	Lazar Tomanović	Independent	14 September 1910 – 23 August 1911
Minister of Justice	Lazar Tomanović	Independent	14 September 1910 – 23 August 1911
Minister of the Interior	Marko Đukanović	Independent	14 September 1910 – 23 August 1911
Minister of Finance and Construction	Filip Jergović	True People´s Party	14 September 1910 – 23 August 1911
Minister of Education and Ecclesiastical Affairs	Filip Jergović	True People´s Party	14 August – 23 August 1910
Minister of Education and Ecclesiastical Affairs	Pero Vučković	Independent	23 August 1910 – 23 August 1911
Minister of War	Ivo Đurović	Independent	14 September 1910 – 2 August 1911
Minister of War	Marko Đukanović	Independent	2 August – 23 August 1911 (Interim)
