= First government of Lazar Tomanović =

Government of Lazar Tomanović I
- 5th Cabinet of Principality of Montenegro
- 1907–1909
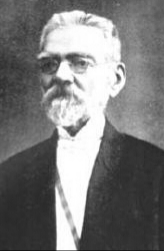
- Lazar Tomanović
- Date formed: April 17, 1907
- Date dissolved: April 15, 1909

People and organisations
- Head of state: Nicholas I
- Head of government: Lazar Tomanović
- No. of ministers: 5
- Member parties: Independent, True People's Party

History
- Predecessor: First government of Andrija Radović
- Successor: Second government of Lazar Tomanović

The first government of Lazar Tomanović lasted from 4 April 1907 to 2 April 1909 (according to the old calendar).

== History ==
For five years, the Montenegrin sovereign Nicholas I handed over the government to the right-wing political group, and the Prime Minister to Dr. Lazar Tomanović. His government was reconstituted several times (17 April 1907 – 15 April 1909), (15 April 1909 – 6 February 1910), (6 February 1910 – 13 April 1910), (13 April 1910 – 14 September 1910), (14 September 1910 – 23 August 1911), (23 August 1911 – 19 June 1912).

As soon as the government was formed, the prince ordered the postponement of the parliamentary sessions, which the government had announced by decree within two months of the convocation. The assembly did not meet at all. The government had no intention of convening it. It simply postponed the parliamentary sessions so as not to have to immediately dissolve the elections. Thus, at the end of June, the assembly was dissolved and the elections were scheduled for October 18.

The long-serving president of the Montenegrin government (Lazar Tomanović) was primarily responsible for administrative matters, and decided on all political issues within the competence of the Gospodar government.

== Cabinet ==
Portfolio	Minister	Party	In office
Prime Minister	Lazar Tomanović	Independent	17 April 1907 – 15 April 1909
Minister of Foreign Affairs	Lazar Tomanović	Independent	17 April 1907 – 15 April 1909
Minister of Justice	Lazar Tomanović	Independent	17 April 1907 – 15 April 1909
Minister of the Interior	Lakić Vojvodić	Independent	17 April 1907 – 15 April 1909
Minister of Finance and Construction	Dušan Vukotić	Independent	17 April 1907 – 15 April 1909
Minister of War	Mitar Martinović	True People's Party	17 April 1907 – 15 April 1909
Minister of Education and Ecclesiastical Affairs	Jovan Plamenac	True People's Party	17 April 1907 – 15 April 1909
