= First government of Andrija Radović =

Government of Andrija Radović I
- 4th Cabinet of Principality of Montenegro
- 1907
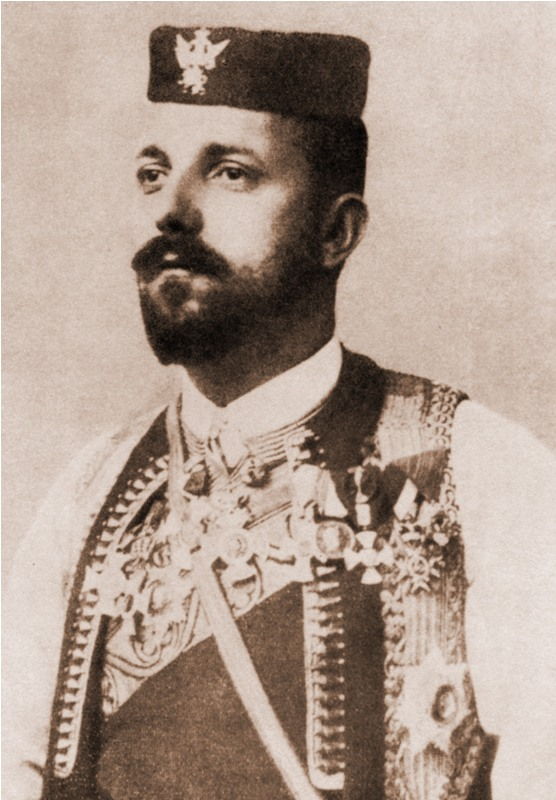
- Andrija Radović
- Date formed: February 1, 1907
- Date dissolved: April 17, 1907

People and organisations
- Head of state: Nicholas I
- Head of government: Andrija Radović
- No. of ministers: 3
- Member parties: Independent, People's Party

History
- Predecessor: Government of Marko Radulović
- Successor: First government of Lazar Tomanović

The first government of Andrija Radović lasted from 19 January 1907 to 4 April 1907 (according to the old calendar).

== History ==
The appointment of the three-member cabinet was, according to some contemporaries, a severe political blow, while others considered it an expression of anti-bureaucratic thinking and financial austerity.

== Cabinet ==
| Portfolio | Minister | Party | In office |
|---|---|---|---|
| Prime Minister | Andrija Radović | People's Party | 1 February – 17 April 1907 |
| Minister of Foreign Affairs | Andrija Radović | People's Party | 1 February – 17 April 1907 |
| Minister of War | Andrija Radović | People's Party | 1 February – 17 April 1907 |
| Minister of Finance and Construction | Andrija Radović | People's Party | 1 February – 17 April 1907 |
| Minister of the Interior | Mihailo Ivanović | People's Party | 1 February – 17 April 1907 |
| Minister of Justice | Gavrilo Cerović | Independent | 1 February – 17 April 1907 |
| Minister of Education and Ecclesiastical Affairs | Gavrilo Cerović | Independent | 1 February – 17 April 1907 |
