= Savo Čelebić =

Montenegrin military officer

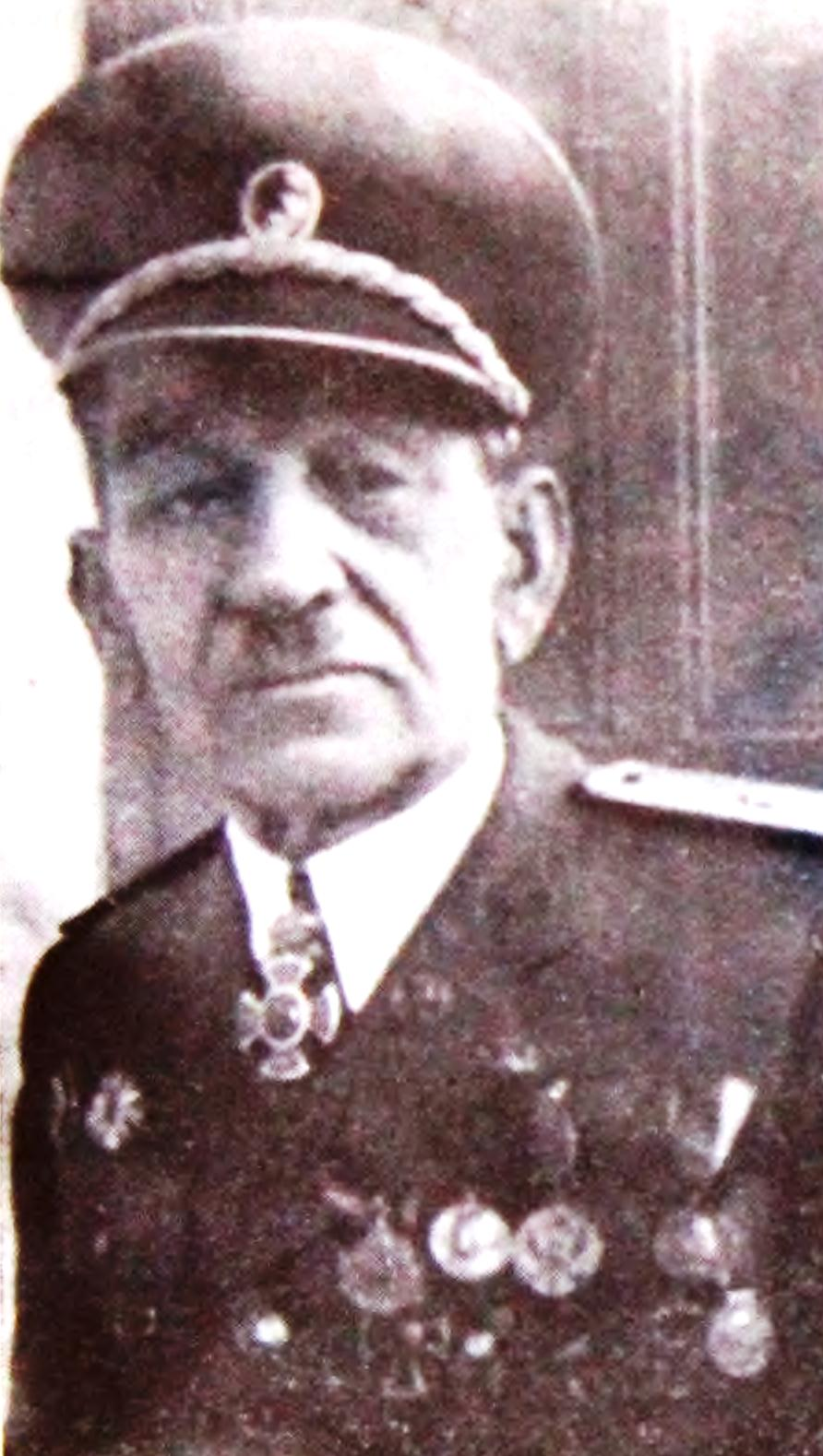
- Born: 26 October 1879; Štitari, Cetinje, Montenegro
- Died: 21 June 1955 (aged 75); Cetinje, SR Montenegro, Yugoslavia
- Military career
- Allegiance: Principality of Montenegro; Kingdom of Montenegro; SFR Yugoslavia
- Branch: Army
- Service years: 1908–1918, 1942–1955
- Rank: Major General
- Units: Greens; Yugoslav Partisans
- Conflicts: First Balkan War; Siege of Scutari; Second Balkan War; Battle of Bregalnica; World War I; Christmas Uprising; World War II
- Awards: Obilić Medal

Savo Čelebić (Štitari, Cetinje, 26 October 1879 - Cetinje, 21 June 1955) was a Montenegrin officer, a participant in the Balkan Wars and World War I, an opponent of the unification of Montenegro and Serbia, participant in the Christmas Uprising, as well as a participant in the World War II and a Major General of the Yugoslav People’s Army.

== Biography ==
He was born in the village of Štitari, near Cetinje, then-capital of the Principality of Montenegro to his father Filip, a plumber and member of the Parliament of Montenegro and recipient of the Obilić medal and his mother, Savica Vujović.

He finished elementary school in the village of Gradac, and the military school in 1908 in Cetinje. He was then promoted to the rank of second lieutenant. He became an officer of the Montenegrin Royal Army in 1911. He was the commander of the Oraško-Štirary company and a teacher in the army school. He was a unit commander during the Siege of Shkodër and in the Battle of Bregalnica. During the battles for Skadar, as a battalion commander, he was wounded twice, for which he was awarded the gold Obilić medal.

After the end of the First World War and the creation of the Kingdom of Yugoslavia, dissatisfied with the loss of independence of the Kingdom of Montenegro, he participated in the Christmas Uprising in January 1919 as one of the commanders of the Greens. Afterwards he spent some time in Gaeta, in the Kingdom of Italy, the base in-exile for Montenegrin soldiers who remained loyal to the deposed King Nicholas I and were supporters of the independence of Montenegro.

After being granted amnesty by the authorities of the Kingdom of Yugoslavia, he returned to the country, where he was retired with the rank of lieutenant colonel. During the occupation in the Second World War, at the beginning of 1942, he refused to join the armed forces of General Krsto Popović, which were formed with the support of the Italian occupation authorities. He then joined the Partisans and during 1943, on behalf of the Yugoslav People's Army, led unsuccessful negotiations with General Popović regarding him joining forces with the Partisans. After the capitulation of Italy in September 1943, he was sent to Italy, where he became the commander of the First Overseas Brigade.

On January 30, 1944, he was promoted to the rank of major general of the Yugoslav People's Army.

Married to his wife Milica, he had ten children – four sons: Milovan (b. 1912), Vladimir (1914), Slobodan (1929) and Filip (1936) and six daughters: Dragica (b. 1918), Zorka (1919), Darinka (1924), Olga (1927), Bosiljka (1931) and Angelija (1933).

He died on 21 June 1955 in Cetinje and was buried on 23 June 1955, with state honours, in the family tomb in Cetinje.
