= Greens (Montenegro) =

Loyalists of the dethroned King of Montenegro Nicholas I

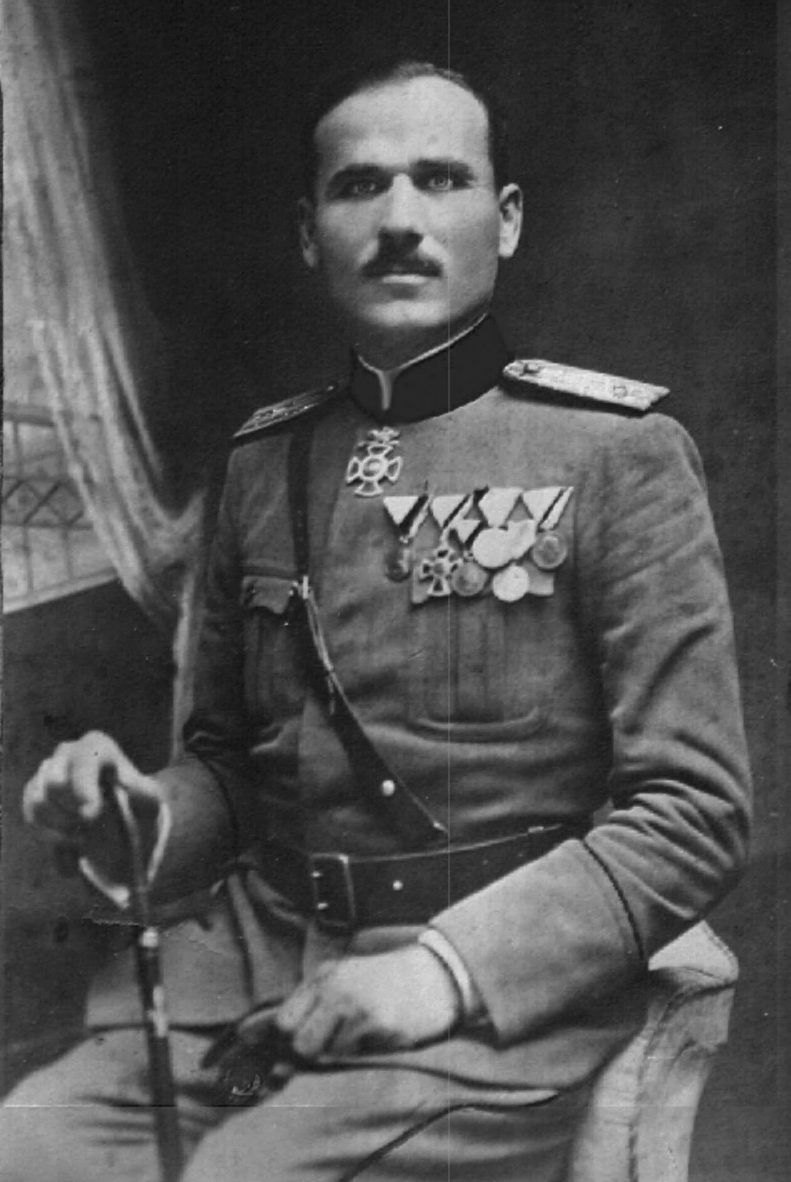
Krsto Popović, the best-known leader of the Greens

The Greens (Serbo-Croatian: Зеленаши, Zelenaši) were a group of loyalists of King Nikola of Montenegro. They originated from the members of the True People's Party and were most notable for instigating the Christmas Uprising of 1919. The rebellion was staged in an attempt to prevent the dethroning of the Petrović-Njegoš dynasty and the subsequent integration of Montenegro into the Kingdom of Yugoslavia. The Greens were supporters of the House of Petrović-Njegoš, which was dethroned after World War I. Following their defeat in the Christmas Rebellion, the Greens continued on with their guerrilla warfare until 1929. The motto of the movement was "For the Right, Honour and Freedom of Montenegro".

During World War II, the Greens were activated once again under the leadership of Krsto Popović in an attempt to re-establish the Kingdom of Montenegro as an Axis client state.

== Characteristics ==
The Greens (Zelenaši) movement was originally founded in 1918 in Montenegro by the opponents of Montenegrin unification with the Kingdom of Serbia and integration into the newly established Kingdom of Yugoslavia, when they supported the House of Petrović-Njegoš of Montenegro over the House of Karađorđević of Serbia. After the unsuccessful armed rebellion known as the Christmas Rebellion, the Greens continued guerrilla resistance until 1929, while their political activity was based on opposition to the mode and manner in which the south Slavic unification was implemented, resulting in the disappearance of Montenegro as a political entity. According to the Croatian-American academic Ivo Banac they declared themselves as Serbs.

As a member of a joint American–British mission, the British diplomat Earl John de Salis wrote a detailed report. The Earl stated that no one denied that Montenegro might need to be unified with Serbia and the budding Yugoslav state. However, the issue was “to be able to join it as Montenegro, and not as a prefecture of Serbia, as free Montenegrins, in line with the tradition and the past of their country, and not as yes-men of Belgrade, to join it on equal footing as the Slovenes, the Croats and the very Serbs.”, i.e. on conditions of equality and preservation of identity of Montenegro.

The Greens drew their membership from the Highland tribes (Moračani, Piperi, and Rovci), the Katun clans (Bjelice, Cetinje, Čevo, and Cuce), and the Herzegovinian tribes (Nikšići, Rudinjani and Drobnjaci). Notable leaders of the Greens included Krsto Zrnov Popović, Jovan S. Plamenac and Novica Radović.

Some of the Greens re-gathered during World War II, under the command of Krsto Zrnov Popović, a collaborator of fascist Italy. They were organized into a military unit called the Lovćen Brigade featuring four brigades that participated in the chaotic civil war raging on the ground in Montenegro and whose military activity was mostly directed against the communist Partisans. After their military defeat, most of the surviving Greens members joined the Partisans, with some joining the Ustaše and a minority joining the Chetniks. Other members of the Greens joined Partisans or Chetniks from the beginning of the Axis invasion of Yugoslavia.

== Name ==
The name of the Greens derives from the green voting cards that were used by the opponents of unification with Serbia used at the Podgorica Assembly in 1918.

== History ==
=== Christmas Rebellion ===
Flag of the Greens from 1918.

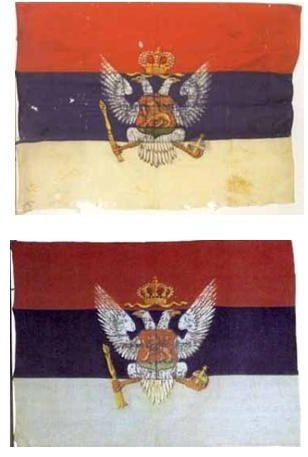
Flags of Kingdom of Montenegro used by the Greens in exile in Gaeta.

The Greens opposed the unification of the Kingdom of Montenegro with the Kingdom of Serbia under the House of Karađorđević. With support from Italy, the Greens organised a rebellion in 1919 with the aim of bringing the House of Petrović-Njegoš back to the Montenegrin throne. The rebellion failed and the rebels fled to Italy. Krsto Zrnov Popović, Jovan Plamenac and Novica Radović led the uprising, along with Commander Savo Čelebić and Captain Đuro Drašković.

=== Interwar period ===
After the unsuccessful uprising, the Greens returned to Montenegro, starting a guerrilla warfare. The core of the revolt was subdued in 1922–1923, but low-level guerrilla continued in the mountains and highlands for several more years. In 1922, a number of leaders of the Greens founded the Montenegrin Federalist Party, shifting from organised armed resistance to political struggle.

By 1926, most remaining forms of armed resistance ended. However, a few groups continued engaging in skirmishes until 1929.

=== World War II: restoration and dissolution ===
In World War II, the Greens were organized yet again in Montenegro under the command of the Fascist Italy. Sekula Drljević was put in power and proclaimed the re-establishment of an independent Montenegro, but was immediately ousted by the 13 July uprising of local Partisans and Chetniks. Among the Montenegrin federalists, Krsto Zrnov Popović returned from exile in Italy to attempt to lead the Greens. The Greens' forces were called the Lovćen Brigade. Soon, they were disorganized and one group of Greens joined the Partisans, while another joined the Croatian Ustaše and some joined the Chetniks.

After the Partisan victory in 1945, many leaders of the Greens were killed as the collaborators of the Italian occupation: the same Popović was murdered in 1947. At the same time, the Communists were killing many potential opponents all over Yugoslavia. This marked the end of the Greens.

== Order of Freedom of Montenegro ==
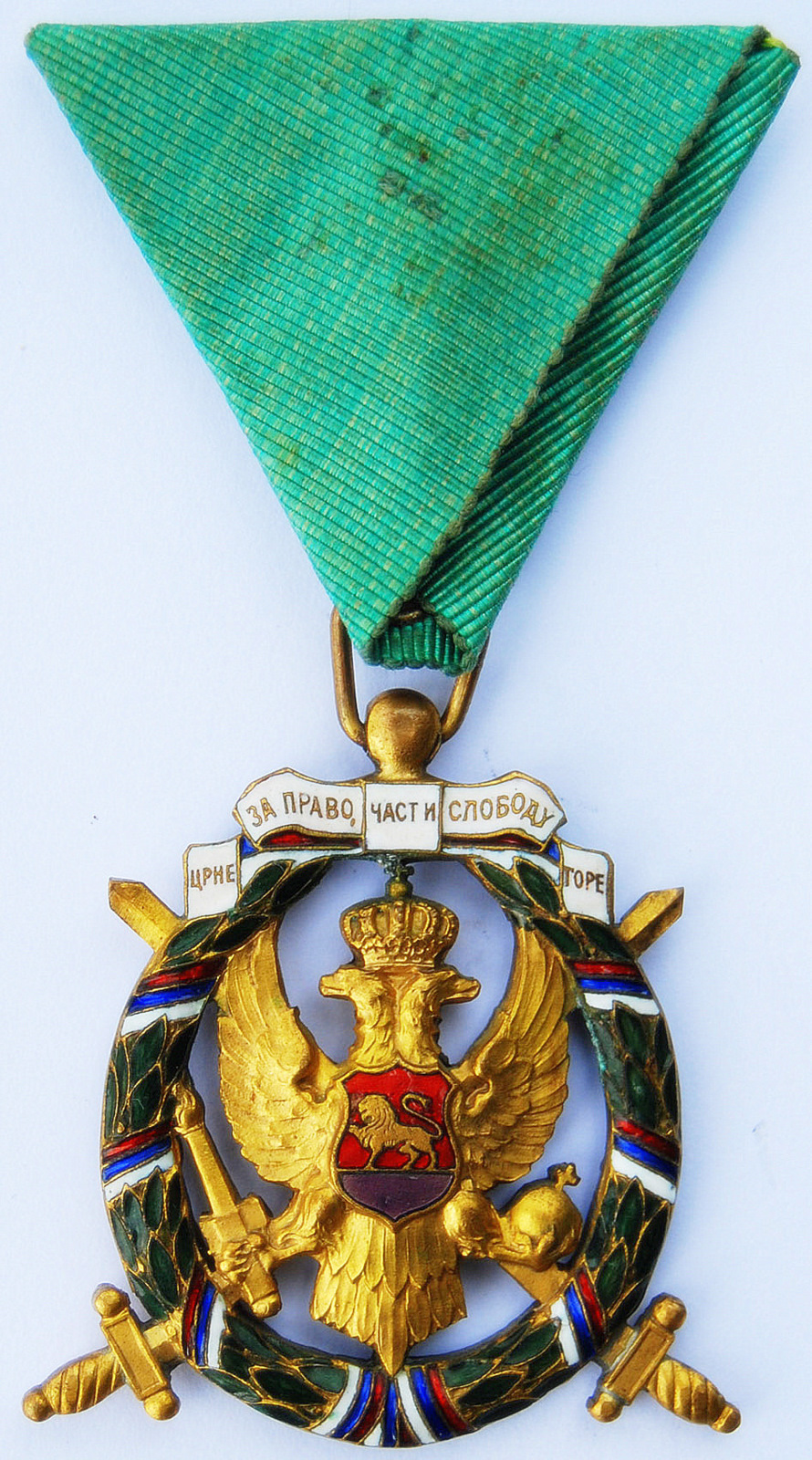
Order of Freedom

The Order of Freedom of Montenegro was issued by the exiled King Nikola in January 1919. This order was mainly dedicated to the Greens.

== See also ==
- Montenegrin Whites
