= Ministry of Interior Affairs =

Ministry of Interior Affairs may refer to:

- Ministry of Interior Affairs (Afghanistan)
- Ministry of Interior Affairs (Albania)
- Ministry of Interior Affairs (Montenegro)
- Ministry of Interior Affairs (Ukraine)
