= Police Directorate of Montenegro =

Police Directorate of Montenegro Uprava Policije Crne Gore
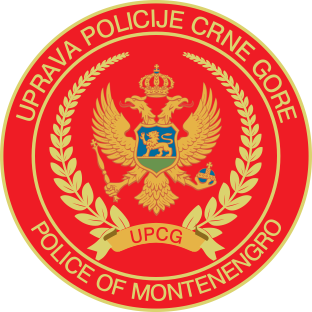
- Emblem of the Montenegro Police

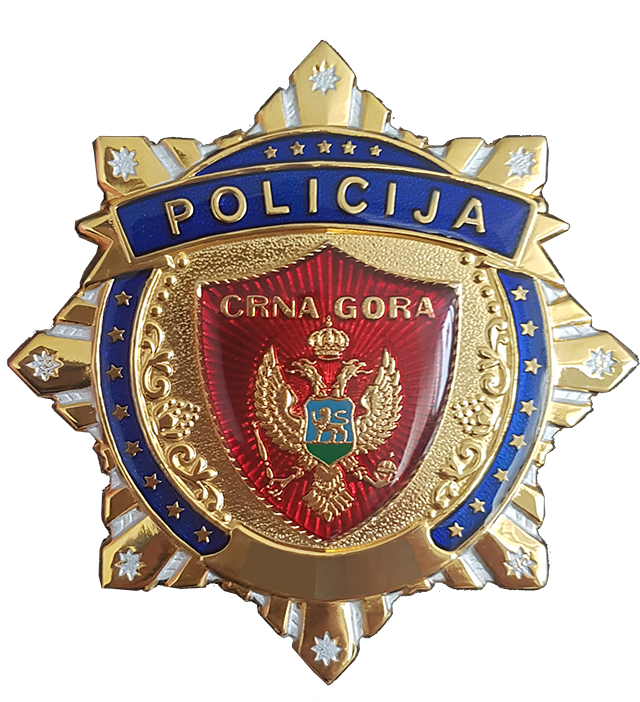
- Badge of the Montenegro Police
- Common name: Policija Crne Gore

Agency overview
- Formed: 1994
- Preceding agency: Milicija (Socialist Republic of Montenegro)

Jurisdictional structure
- Operations jurisdiction: Montenegro
- Governing body: Ministry of Internal Affairs
- General nature: Local civilian police

Operational structure
- Headquarters: Podgorica, 22 Svetog Petra Cetinjskog Boulevard
- Sworn members: 3,296
- Minister responsible: Danilo Šaranović, Minister of Internal Affairs
- Agency executive: Lazar Šćepanović, Police Director

Facilities
- Regional Police Units: 4

Website
- www.gov.me/mup/policija

The Police Directorate of Montenegro (Montenegrin: Управа полиције Црне Горе, romanized: Uprava Policije Crne Gore) is the national police force of Montenegro.

== Organization ==
Police Directorate of Montenegro is a law enforcement agency within Ministry of Interior, maintaining full operational independence in police matters, while Ministry is responsible for budgetary matters, administrative issues, human resources management and oversight roles (Internal affairs, Disciplinary Commission, Board of Ethics).

Police Directorate is headed by the Director of Police Directorate, appointed by the Minister of Interior for a five-year term, based on the outcome of public application and selection process. Officers directly subordinate to the director are deputy directors, each heading a department with national jurisdiction; as well as heads of regional police units, responsible for local law enforcement duties within territorial jurisdiction of their Regional police unit.

Application process for director and deputy directors is open for public prosecutors, judges and officers of both military of Montenegro and National Security Agency of Montenegro, with specific stipulations regarding experience in management roles; while all other heads of internal subdivisions can only be appointed from senior police officer cadre.

Currently valid Bylaw on Organization and structure of the Ministry of Interior defines Police Directorate with five departments and four regional units:

- General police department
- Criminal investigations department
- Border police department
- Special purpose police department
- Financial intelligence unit

Regional police units are

- Regional police unit South (Subdivisions Herceg Novi, Kotor, Tivat, Budva, Bar, Ulcinj)
- Regional police unit West (Subdivisions Nikšić, Pljevlja, Šavnik, Žabljak, Plužine)
- Regional police unit North (Subdivisions Bijelo Polje, Berane, Mojkovac, Kolašin, Plav, Rožaje, Andrijevica, Petnjica, Gusinje)
- Regional police unit Center (Subdivisions Podgorica, Cetinje, Danilovgrad, Tuzi, Zeta)

Besides aforementioned operative subdivisions, Police directorate also has several support units - Forensics Center and units tasked with analytics, external coordination, administration of electronic / digital police assets etc.

== Resources ==
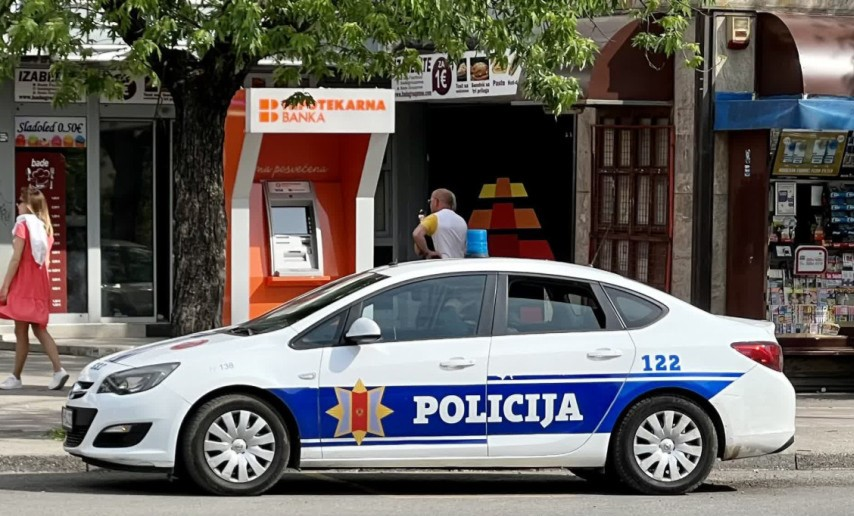
Police Directorate Opel Astra

Police directorate of Montenegro struggles with chronic understaffing - there were 3,296 police officers on active duty in December 2025, while optimal number (as envisioned by the Bylaw on Organization and structure of the Ministry of Interior) is 5,462 officers. Although per capita number of police officers in Montenegro seems high, this statistic is highly skewed by the massive border police department, which is tasked with all aspects of border security enforcement.

Police directorate headquarters are located in central Podgorica, at 22 Svetog Petra Cetinjskog Boulevard. Major police management offices are split between Monumental Ministry of Interior building, erected in 1950s, and adjacent Podgorica police station building, in operation since 2010.

The Police Academy is located in Danilovgrad, and provides both basic police education, and professional and specialized training. The Forensic Center is also located in Danilovgrad.

Montenegro's Civil Police Aviation Unit forms part of the Montenegro Government Aviation Unit, and purchased its first aircraft in 1972, with three more SA341 Gazelles transferred from the military air force in the 1990s. Aviation unit also operates two Augusta-Bell AB412. All helicopters are based at Golubovci Airport, Podgorica.

== Police directors ==
- Veselin Veljović (October 2005 – December 2011)
- Božidar Vuksanović (December 2011 – February 2013, acting)
- Slavko Stojanović (February 2013 – March 2018)
- Vesko Damjanović (March 2018 – July 2018, acting)
- Veselin Veljović (July 2018 – December 2020)
- Vesko Damjanović (December 2020 – February 2021, acting)
- Zoran Brđanin (February 2021 – March 2023)
- Nikola Terzić (March 2023 – December 2023, acting)
- Zoran Brđanin (December 2023 – March 2024)
- Aleksandar Radović (March 2024 – July 2024, acting)
- Zoran Brđanin (July 2024 – December 2024)
- Lazar Šćepanović (December 2024 – present)

== Ranks ==
=== Officers ===
	Police Executive		Police Inspectors
Montenegro
Montenegro	Direktor policije	Pomoćnik direktora policije	Glavni policijski inspektor	Viši policijski inspektor I klase	Viši policijski inspektor	Samostalni policijski inspektor	Policijski inspektor I klase	Policijski inspektor	Mlađi policijski inspektor
Montenegro	Police Director	Deputy; Police Director	Chief; Police Inspector	Senior Police Inspector; I class	Senior; Police Inspector	Independent; Police Inspector	Police Inspector; I class	Police Inspector	Junior; Police Inspector

=== Enlisted ===
	Police Sergeants			Police Officers
Montenegro
Montenegro	Stariji policijski narednik I klase	Stariji policijski narednik	Policijski narednik	Stariji policajac I klase	Stariji policajac	Policajac
Montenegro	Senior Police Sergeant; I class	Senior; Police Sergeant	Police Sergeant	Senior Police Officer; I class	Senior; Police Officer	Police Officer

== History ==
=== Controversies ===
In June 2023, the anti-torture committee of the Council of Europe urged Montenegro to investigate police brutality. Europol published a report on 23 March 2022 that included photographs of policemen torturing prisoners. The report cited various instances of alleged mistreatment of prisoners including falaka, genital torture, electrical shocks, asphyxiation as well as threats of rape and threats against the children and other family members of prisoners. In response, the Montenegrin government has expressed willingness to follow the recommendations brought forward by the Committee for the Prevention of Torture and Inhuman or Degrading Treatment or Punishment (CPT).

== See also ==
- Crime in Montenegro
