= Evgenije Popović =

Montenegrin statesman, journalist, diplomat, writer and editor

Evgenije Popović Eugenio Popović
- Евгеније Поповић
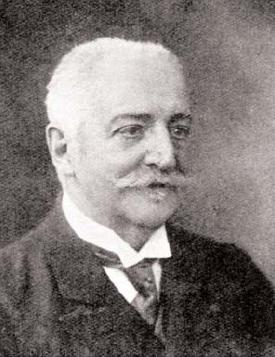
- Evgenije Popović

4th Prime Minister of Kingdom of Montenegro in-Exile
- In office 11 June 1917 – 17 February 1919
- Monarch: Nicholas I
- Preceded by: Milo Matanović
- Succeeded by: Jovan Plamenac

4th Minister of Foreign Affairs of Kingdom of Montenegro in-Exile
- In office 11 June 1917 – 17 February 1919
- Monarch: Nicholas I
- Prime Minister: Himself
- Preceded by: Milutin Mijušković
- Succeeded by: Jovan Plamenac

Montenegrin consul in Rome
- In office 1897–1900
- Monarchs: Nicholas I Kings of Italy Umberto I Victor Manuel III
- Prime Minister: Božo Petrović-Njegoš

Montenegrin general-consul in Rome
- In office 1900–1917
- Monarchs: Nicholas I Kings of Italy Umberto I Victor Manuel III
- Prime Minister: Božo Petrović-Njegoš; Lazar Mijušković; Marko Radulović; Andrija Radović; Lazar Tomanović; Mitar Martinović; Janko Vukotić; Milo Matanović; Lazar Mijušković; Andrija Radović; Milo Matanović

Personal details
- Born: Евгеније Поповић; 6 January 1842 Risan, Kingdom of Dalmatia
- Died: 4 April 1931 (aged 89) Trieste, Kingdom of Italy
- Citizenship: Montenegro; Italy
- Occupation: Statesman, journalist, diplomat, writer and editor
- Cabinet: Government of Evgenije Popović

Evgenije "Đena" Popović GBE (Serbian Cyrillic: Евгеније Поповић; 6 January 1842 - 4 April 1931) was a Montenegrin statesman, journalist, diplomat, writer and editor.

== Biography ==
Evgenije "Đena" Popović was born in 1842 on his father's ship in Risan, a town in the Kingdom of Dalmatia of the Dual Monarchy of Austria-Hungary. Though born in Risan, where his father Drago and grandfather Krsto are from. Popović's family descends from the Kuči tribe. He finished grade school in Trieste as a school friend of Prince Nicholas of Montenegro. He later graduated Law School in Italy, gaining a PhD, and settled his life permanently in Italy naturalized. He was a lawyer in Italy, however, casually engaged in journalism and even the editing of Diritto newspaper for a period. He also wrote works on the Adriatic sea and several articles, which were published by local and international press.

Popović was a friend of Italian patriot and member of the Risorgimento, participating in the detachments of Giuseppe Garibaldi during the struggle for Italian unification. Popović also participated in the Montenegrin-Ottoman War of 1876-1878, in which he was wounded twice. Together with several soldiers, Popović reported the events of the Montenegrin-Ottoman War to international press.

Popović was the Montenegrin consul in Rome, Italy from 1897 till 1900, when he became the Montenegrin general-consul in Rome. While consul, Popovic visited a rich collection of Montenegro antiques. He held his position as general-consul until 1917.

After Milo Matanovic resigned from position of PM, King Nicholas invited and appointed Evgenije Prime Minister of the Kingdom of Montenegro in Exile as well as Minister of Internal Affairs at the same time which was a traditional Montenegrin custom, on 11 June 1917. Since the Government has lost most support on the international scene after the break-off of Andrija Radović, Popović worked actively and hardly to regain the prestige for King Nicholas. He tried to persuade the Montenegrin consul to lobby Nicholas' policy in the United States, however he has already declared loyalty to Radović's Committee for Unification.

With the liberation of Montenegro from the Central Powers' by the Serbian armed forces after the break through the Balkan Front, Popović attempted to secure the return of Nicholas and the Government to Montenegro on 16 November 1918 at the British Court, but this attempt has met only refusal. Although also failing to secure France's support for Nicholas' return, he has managed to get confirmation that France shall respect the legal Montenegrin authorities in exile and secure that the local military administration shall administer in the name of the King. France also claimed it will remain neutral for Montenegro's internal affairs, respecting the King's authority but also not opposing the desire and free will of the Montenegrin people to decide. Popović's government and King Nicholas have accepted these terms, which henceforth became the basis for the Podgorica Assembly.

Since late 1918 he was no longer in Neuilly, so the position of Minister of Foreign Affairs is held by Dr. Pero Šoć. With the end of the Great War, Popović has lobbied at the Allied Powers' courts and managed to secure a Montenegrin seat for the post-war Paris Peace Conference. After the Podgorica Assembly has declared unification with Serbia and dethroned the Petrović-Njegoš dynasty, Popović dismissed and declared its decisions nullified and void. Popović complained to the Great Powers that the decision was illegal, but met little response. Disappointed by Popović's work, Nicholas replaced him with Jovan S. Plamenac, the organizer of the Christmas Uprising, an event which occurred several days earlier and met Popović's condemnation.

Preceded by Milutin Mijušković	4th Minister of Foreign Affairs of Kingdom of Montenegro in-Exile; 29 May 1917–17 February 1919	Succeeded by Jovan Plamenac
Preceded by Milo Matanović	4th Prime Minister of Kingdom of Montenegro in-Exile; 29 May 1917–17 February 1919	Succeeded by Anto Gvozdenović
