= Sekula Drljević =

Montenegrin and Yugoslav politician (1884–1945)

- Секула Дрљевић
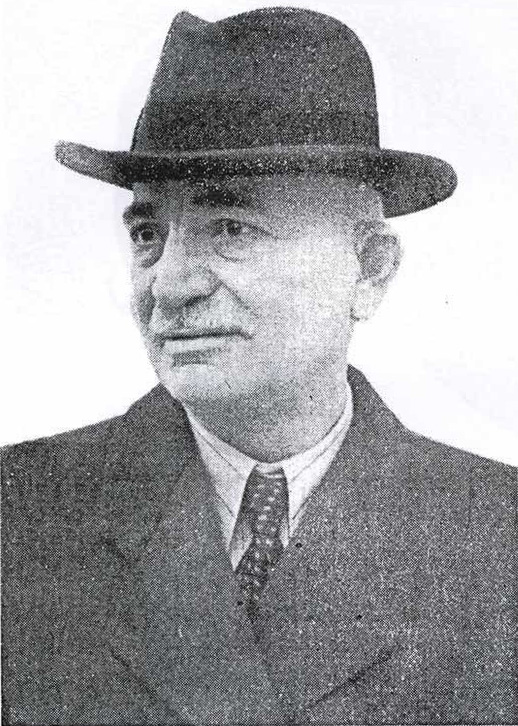
- Drljević in c. 1937–1939

President of the Governing Committee of Italian governorate of Montenegro
- In office 12 July – 3 October 1941 (Note: de jure)
- Governor: Serafino Mazzolini; Alessandro Pirzio Biroli
- Succeeded by: Blažo Đukanović (as the Head of the National Committee)

Member of the National Assembly of Kingdom of Serbs, Croats and Slovenes
- In office February 1925 – September 1927
- Constituency: Kolašin

3rd Minister of Finance and Construction of the Kingdom of Montenegro
- In office 19 June 1912 – 8 May 1913
- Monarch: Nicholas I
- Prime Minister: Mitar Martinović
- Preceded by: Filip Jergović
- Succeeded by: Risto Popović

10th Minister of Justice of the Principality of Montenegro
- In office 15 April 1909 – 6 February 1910
- Monarch: Nicholas I
- Prime Minister: Lazar Tomanović
- Preceded by: Lazar Tomanović
- Succeeded by: Pero Vucković

10th Minister of Education and Ecclesiastical Affairs of Principality of Montenegro
- In office 15 April 1909 – 6 February 1910
- Monarch: Nicholas I
- Prime Minister: Lazar Tomanović
- Preceded by: Jovan Plamenac
- Succeeded by: Pero Vucković

Leader of Montenegrin Federalist Party
- In office 1923–1945 Serving with Mihailo Ivanović and Krsto Popović

Personal details
- Born: 7 September 1884 Kolašin, Montenegro
- Died: 10 November 1945 (aged 61) Judenburg, Austria
- Party: Montenegrin Federalist Party; True People's Party
- Education: University of Zagreb
- Occupation: Politician, lawyer

Sekula Drljević (Serbian Cyrillic: Секула Дрљевић; 7 September 1884 – 10 November 1945) was a Yugoslav Montenegrin nationalist jurist, politician, orator, theoretician and collaborationist convicted for war crimes. During World War II, he became a collaborator with Nazi Germany and Fascist Italy, and cooperated with the Ustaše in the German puppet state of Croatia.

Born in the town of Kolašin, he earned a doctorate degree in law and became the Minister of Justice and Finance in the Kingdom of Montenegro before the outbreak of World War I. During the interwar period, he was a leading member of the "Greens", a Montenegrin nationalist and separatist movement. A proponent of the theory that Montenegrins were an ethnic group distinct from Serbs, he also founded and became the leader of the Montenegrin Federalist Party.

Following the Axis invasion of Yugoslavia in April 1941, Drljević began cooperating with the Italian authorities occupying Montenegro. In July, he proclaimed the reestablishment of the Kingdom of Montenegro, but his attempt to establish an Axis-aligned puppet state triggered an immediate uprising. That September, Italian authorities sent him to an internment camp in Italy after the outbreak of an anti-fascist revolt. Drljević escaped the camp several months later and made his way into the German-held half of the Independent State of Croatia (NDH). In the summer of 1944, he created the Montenegrin State Council in Zagreb.

Drljević moved back to Montenegro in 1945 and agreed to the formation of the Montenegrin National Army with Chetnik commander Pavle Đurišić. Đurišić and several other Chetnik commanders were later ambushed and killed on behalf of Drljević and the NDH. Đurišić's men later joined Drljević's Montenegrin National Army and withdrew with him towards the Austrian border. In mid-1945, Drljević crossed over into Austria with his wife, and the two ended up in a camp for displaced persons in Judenburg, where they were killed by Chetnik agents seeking to avenge Đurišić's death.

== Early life and political career ==
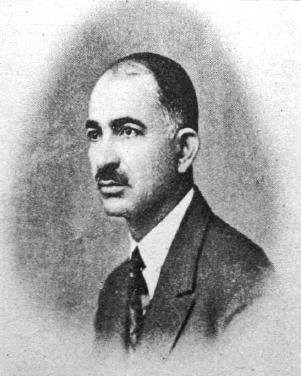
Sekula Drljević, c. 1925

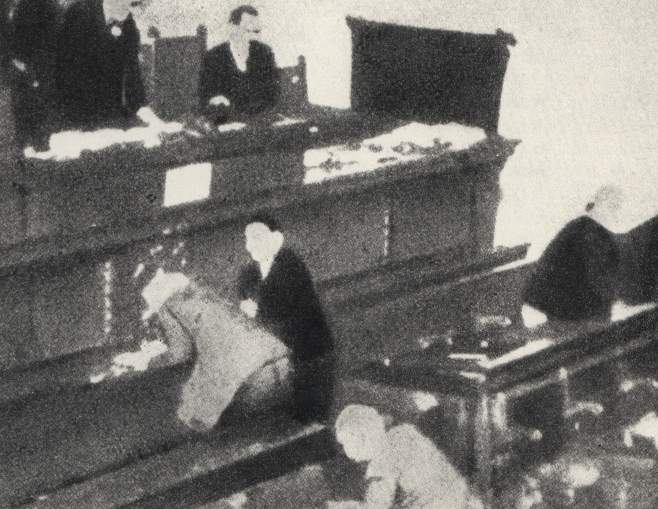
Drljević attempted to dissuade Stjepan Radić from attending a session of the Yugoslav parliament prior to his assassination there in 1928 (pictured).

Sekula Drljević was born on 7 September 1884 in the village of Ravno, near the town of Kolašin. Having finished law school in Zagreb and earned a doctorate degree, he became the Minister of Justice and Finance in the Kingdom of Montenegro in 1910. His brother Janko Drljević was at that time an MP from the loyalist True People's Party. Drljević also became an MP, and also served as a minister in King Nikola's cabinet during the Balkan Wars (1912–13), and was renowned for his rhetorical skills.

During World War I, he was captured by Austro-Hungarian forces and interned at the Boldagason internment camp in Hungary, where he grew strongly opposed to King Nikola. He was released after the war and moved to Zemun and worked as a lawyer there. He became a leading member of the "Greens" (zelenaši), a Montenegrin separatist movement which sided with the Yugoslav Federalist Party. During this time, he cooperated frequently with Croatian politicians such as Stjepan Radić, Vlatko Maček, and Ante Pavelić, with whom he became good friends. In the mid-1920s, Drljević founded the Montenegrin Federalist Party. He quickly became the party's sole leader and foremost theoretician.

He expressed support for the unity of Yugoslavia and stressed Montenegro's loyalty to Serbian nationhood, but argued that a nation did not necessarily need to be part of a single state and hinted that he would support the restoration of Montenegro's independence. Consequently, the "Greens" demanded that Yugoslavia's internal boundaries be organized to match the borders of the Balkan states as they were prior to 1918.

Drljević and Mihailo Ivanović had first attempted to found the Montenegrin Party for the 1920 election of a Constitutional Assembly, but were unable to do so due to a lack of time and resistance by the authorities. Drljević ran unsuccessfully for the Montenegrin Federalist Party in the 1923 elections in both the counties of Nikšić and Kolašin. He ran again in Kolašin in 1925 and was elected to the National Assembly. In 1927, Drljević was elected representative of the Zemun District on the electoral list of the Croatian Peasant Party (HSS). Afterwards, he helped solve a political rift between Radić and Serb politician Svetozar Pribićević, resulting in the formation of an HSS–Democratic Party coalition. The following year, Drljević unsuccessfully attempted to dissuade Radić from attending the National Assembly of the Kingdom of Serbs, Croats and Slovenes prior to his assassination by Serb politician Puniša Račić.

== World War II ==
=== Montenegrin collaborationist ===
On 6 April 1941, Axis forces invaded Yugoslavia. Montenegro was invaded by the forces of Germany and Italy, with the Germans attacking from Bosnia and Herzegovina and the Italians from Albania. The Germans later withdrew, leaving the Italians to occupy the area. In the western portion of Yugoslavia, Pavelić, who had been in exile in Benito Mussolini's Italy, was appointed Poglavnik (leader) of an Ustaše-led Croatian state – the Independent State of Croatia (Croatian: Nezavisna Država Hrvatska, NDH). The NDH combined almost all of modern-day Croatia, all of modern-day Bosnia and Herzegovina and parts of modern-day Serbia into an "Italian-German quasi-protectorate". NDH authorities, led by the Ustaše Militia, subsequently implemented genocidal policies against the Serb, Jewish and Romani population living within the borders of the new state.

The creation of an Axis puppet-state known as the Kingdom of Montenegro was proclaimed on 12 July 1941. The state was to be headed by an Italian regent and led by Drljević and his supporters. By 13 July, this proclamation prompted the outbreak of an anti-Italian uprising in Montenegro led by local communists (Partisans) and Serb nationalists (Chetniks). Having assumed power the previous day, Drljević established the Provisional Administrative Committee of Montenegro, a collaborationist entity which was a territorial component of the Italian Empire. He also organized his followers to fight against Montenegrin Chetniks and the Yugoslav Partisans. In September, he was dismissed from office by the Italians.

Believing his life was endangered by the revolt, they sent him to an internment camp in Italy. The idea of an independent Montenegro was abandoned, and the Italians opted for a military governorate. Several months later, Drljević escaped and smuggled himself into the German-controlled area of the NDH. With the surrender of Italy in September 1943, he moved back to Zemun. In the summer of 1944 Drljević relocated to Zagreb, where he created a Montenegrin State Council in the NDH with the assistance of the Germans and Croats. He also published a pamphlet in Zagreb titled Who are the Serbs? (Croatian: Tko su Srbi?). In it, he blamed supposedly "aggressive" Serb policies for all past and modern problems in the Balkans, presented ethnic Serbs as a "degenerate race" and pointed out their similarities with Jews.

Following the Axis occupation of Yugoslavia, Drljević had become a proponent of the theory that Montenegrins were an ethnic group distinct from Serbs. As early as 1921, he had stated that Serbian and Montenegrin "mentalities" were diametrically opposed. He stated: "The mentalities of Serbians and Montenegrins are irreconcilable. The visage of the former was speckled with [Ottoman] slavery; liberty gave the latter a new visage." It was not until 1941 that Drljević advanced the notion that Montenegrins were not Slavs at all, but Dinaric people descended from the ancient Illyrians. He wrote:

Races are communities of blood, whereas people are creatures of history. With their language, the Montenegrin people belong to the Slavic linguistic community. By their blood, however, they belong [to the Dinaric peoples]. According to the contemporary science of European races, [Dinaric] peoples are descended from the Illyrians. Hence, not just the kinship, but the identity of certain cultural forms among the Dinaric peoples, all the way from Albanians to South Tyroleans, who are Germanized Illyrians.

=== Retreat and death ===
In the spring of 1945, Drljević visited parts of Montenegro held by the Chetniks of Pavle Đurišić. It was here that Đurišić made a safe-conduct agreement with Drljević and with elements of the Armed Forces of the NDH. Although the details of the agreement are unknown, it appears to have been agreed that Đurišić and his men were to move into the NDH and cross the Sava River into Slavonia where they would be aligned with Drljević as the Montenegrin National Army, with Đurišić retaining operational command. Suspicious of Drljević's intentions, Đurišić tried to outwit him and his forces by sending only his sick and wounded across the Sava, keeping his fit troops south of the river. Following his defeat at the Battle of Lijevče Field, north of Banja Luka, and the defection of one of his sub-units to Drljević, Đurišić was forced to negotiate directly with the leaders of the NDH forces about the further movement of his units towards Slovenia. This appears to have been a trap, as he was attacked and captured by them on his way to the meeting. On 17 April 1945, after he returned to Zagreb, Drljević issued a proclamation with his political program and invited his "army" to fight both new Yugoslavia and Chetniks of Draža Mihailović. On 20 April, Đurišić, Petar Baćović, Dragiša Vasić and Zaharije Ostojić were taken to the Stara Gradiška prison, near Jasenovac.

The Ustaše gathered them in a field alongside 5,000 other Chetnik prisoners and arranged for Drljević and his followers to select 150 Chetnik officers and non-combatant intellectuals for execution. Đurišić, Baćović, Vasić and Ostojić were amongst those selected. They and the others were loaded onto boats by the Ustaše and taken across the Sava River, where they were killed either in the Jasenovac concentration camp itself or in a nearby marsh. Both the NDH forces and Drljević had reasons for ensnaring Đurišić. The NDH forces were motivated by the mass terror committed by Đurišić on the Muslim population in Sandžak and southeastern Bosnia while Drljević was opposed to Đurišić's support of a union of Serbia and Montenegro which ran counter to Drljević's separatism. Left without a leader, the majority of Đurišić's men were integrated into Drljević's Montenegrin National Army and withdrew with him towards the Austrian border.

In the second half of May, the troops of the Montenegrin National Army surrendered to the British and were quickly turned back into Yugoslavia and into the hands of the communists. Drljević managed to evade capture, and he and his wife sought refuge at a camp for displaced persons in the Austrian town of Judenburg. On 10 November 1945, three of Đurišić's followers discovered them there and murdered them by slitting their throats. (Note: Historian Jozo Tomasevich states that the killers were followers of Đurišić. Author Guy Walters identifies them as three agents from Yugoslavia.)

== Legacy ==
In 1944, Drljević remade the lyrics of the Montenegrin patriotic song "Oj, svijetla majska zoro" to celebrate the creation of the Montenegrin axis puppet regime that had been established in July 1941. He was declared a war criminal at the Nuremberg Trials in 1946. When "Oj, svijetla majska zoro" was chosen as the national anthem of Montenegro in 2006 with Drljević's additions intact, many Montenegrin antifascists protested the selection due to its fascist connotations.

== Works ==
- Borba za carinsku, vojnu i diplomatsku uniju između Crne Gore i Srbije (1914) (A battle for a custom, military and diplomatic union between Montenegro and Serbia)
- Centralizam ili federalizam (1926) (Centralism or federalism)
- Balkanski sukobi 1905–1941 (1944) (Balkan conflicts 1905–1941)
- Tko su Srbi? (1944) (Who are the Serbs)

== Bibliography ==
- Karaula, Željko (2022). Drljević 1884-1945. Politička biografija (in Montenegrin). Cetinje: Crnogorski kulturni forum - Dukljanska akademija nauka i umjetnosti. ISBN 978-9940-554-99-6.
- Banac, Ivo (1984). The National Question in Yugoslavia: Origins, History, Politics. Ithaca, New York: Cornell University Press. ISBN 978-0-8014-9493-2.
- Fleming, Thomas (2002). Montenegro: The Divided Land. Rockford, Illinois: Chronicles Press. ISBN 978-0-9619364-9-5.
- Frank, Chaim (2010). "Anti-Semitism in Yugoslavia". In Petersen, Hans-Christian; Salzborn, Samuel (eds.). Antisemitism in Eastern Europe: History and Present in Comparison. Bern, Switzerland: Peter Lang. ISBN 978-3-631-59828-3.
- Glenny, Misha (2012). The Balkans: 1804–2012. London, England: Granta Books. ISBN 978-1-77089-273-6.
- Hoare, Marko Attila (2007). The History of Bosnia: From the Middle Ages to the Present Day. London, England: Saqi. ISBN 978-0-86356-953-1.
- Jovović, Pantelija (1924). Montenegrin Politicians – Portraits (PDF) (in Serbian). Belgrade, Serbia: Vreme.
- Kurapovna, Marcia (2009). Shadows on the Mountain: The Allies, The Resistance, And The Rivalries That Doomed WWII Yugoslavia. Hoboken, New Jersey: John Wiley & Sons. ISBN 978-0-470-08456-4.
- Morrison, Kenneth (2009). Montenegro: A Modern History. New York, New York: I.B. Tauris. ISBN 978-1-84511-710-8.
- Pajović, Radoje (1987). Pavle Đurišić (in Serbo-Croatian). Zagreb, Yugoslavia: Centar za informacije i publicitet. ISBN 978-86-7125-006-1.
- Pavlowitch, Stevan K. (2007). Hitler's New Disorder: The Second World War in Yugoslavia. New York, New York: Columbia University Press. ISBN 978-1-85065-895-5.
- Ramet, Sabrina P. (2006). The Three Yugoslavias: State-Building and Legitimation, 1918–2005. Bloomington, Indiana: Indiana University Press. ISBN 978-0-253-34656-8.
- Roberts, Elizabeth (2007). Realm of the Black Mountain: A History of Montenegro. Ithaca, New York: Cornell University Press. ISBN 978-0-8014-4601-6.
- Rupić, Mato (1997). "Drljević, Sekula". In Dizdar, Zdravko; Grčić, Marko; Ravlić, Slaven; Stuparić, Darko (eds.). Tko je tko u NDH [Who's Who in the NDH] (in Croatian). Zagreb, Croatia: Minerva. p. 100. ISBN 978-953-6377-03-9.
- Thomas, Nigel; Mikulan, Krunoslav (1995). Axis Forces in Yugoslavia 1941–45. New York, New York: Osprey Publishing. ISBN 978-1-85532-473-2.
- Tomasevich, Jozo (1975). War and Revolution in Yugoslavia, 1941–1945: The Chetniks. Stanford, California: Stanford University Press. ISBN 978-0-8047-0857-9.
- Tomasevich, Jozo (2001). War and Revolution in Yugoslavia, 1941–1945: Occupation and Collaboration. Stanford, California: Stanford University Press. ISBN 978-0-8047-3615-2.
- Trencsényi, Balázs; Kopček, Michal (2007). "Petar II Petrović-Njegoš: The Mountain Wreath". Discourses of Collective Identity in Central and Southeast Europe (1770–1945) Volume II: National Romanticism – the Formation of National Movements. Budapest, Hungary: Central European University Press. ISBN 978-963-7326-60-8.
- Troch, Pieter (2008). "The Divergence of Elite National Thought in Montenegro During the Interwar Period". Tokovi Istorije (1–2). University of Ghent: 21–37. ISSN 0354-6497.
- Vukčević, Boško S. (1994). Tito: Architect of Yugoslav Disintegration. New York, New York: Rivercross Publishing. ISBN 978-0-944957-46-2.
- Walters, Guy (2009). Hunting Evil: The Nazi War Criminals Who Escaped and the Quest to Bring Them to Justice. New York, New York: Random House. ISBN 978-0-307-59248-4.
