= Ministry of Education, Science, Culture and Sports (Montenegro) =

Government ministry of Montenegro

Ministry of Education
- Министарство просвјете Ministarstvo prosvjete Ministria e Arsimit

Agency overview
- Formed: 2006
- Jurisdiction: Government of Montenegro
- Headquarters: Podgorica
- Agency executive: Anđela Stojanović, Minister of Education
- Website: mpin.gov.me

Minister of Education (Montenegrin: Министар просвјете / Ministar prosvjete) (Albanian: Ministria e Arsimit) is the person in charge of the Ministry of Education of Montenegro (Ministarstvo prosvjete). Anđela Stojanović is the current Minister of Education, since 31 October 2023.

== Ministers of Education since 1879 ==
=== Minister of Education and Ecclesiastical Affairs (1879-1929) ===
==== Principality of Montenegro ====
Minister of Education and Ecclesiastical Affairs	Name (birth-death)	Mandate			Political party	Prime Minister	Prince
Minister of Education and Ecclesiastical Affairs	Name (birth-death)	Start of position	End of position	Time in office	Political party	Prime Minister	Prince
The Ministry of Education and Ecclesiastical Affairs was under the Minister of Finance until 1882.							Nicholas I (1860–1910)
1	Vojvoda Đuro Cerović	March 20, 1879	1880	1-2 years	Independent	Božo Petrović-Njegoš (1879–1905)	Nicholas I (1860–1910)
2	Ljubomir P. Nenadovic	1880		0-1 years	Independent	Božo Petrović-Njegoš (1879–1905)	Nicholas I (1860–1910)
(1) (3)	Vojvoda Đuro Cerović	1880	1882	1-2 years	Independent	Božo Petrović-Njegoš (1879–1905)	Nicholas I (1860–1910)
4 (1)	Metropolitan Visarion Ljubiša (1823–1884)	1882	April 14, 1884	1-2 years	Independent	Božo Petrović-Njegoš (1879–1905)	Nicholas I (1860–1910)
5 (2)	Metropolitan Mitrofan Ban (1845–1932)	April 14, 1884	October 1, 1885	1 year, 170 days	Independent	Božo Petrović-Njegoš (1879–1905)	Nicholas I (1860–1910)
6 (3)	Jovan Pavlovic	October 1, 1885	1887	1-2 years	Independent	Božo Petrović-Njegoš (1879–1905)	Nicholas I (1860–1910)
6 (3)	Jovan Pavlovic	1887	April 18, 1894	6-7 years	Independent	Božo Petrović-Njegoš (1879–1905)	Nicholas I (1860–1910)
7 (4)	Vojvoda Simo Popović	1896	June 1, 1903	6-7 years	Independent	Božo Petrović-Njegoš (1879–1905)	Nicholas I (1860–1910)
8 (5)	Gavro Vuković (1852–1928)	June 1, 1903	December 19, 1905	2 years, 203 days	Independent	Božo Petrović-Njegoš (1879–1905)	Nicholas I (1860–1910)
9 (6)	Milo Dožić (1860–1919)	December 19, 1905	November 24, 1906	340 days	Independent	Lazar Mijušković (1905–1906)	Nicholas I (1860–1910)
10 (7)	Milosav R. Raičević	November 24, 1906	February 1, 1907	69 days	Independent	Marko Radulović (1906–1907)	Nicholas I (1860–1910)
11 (8)	Gavrilo Cerović (1877–1941)	February 1, 1907	April 17, 1907	75 days	Independent	Andrija Radović (1907)	Nicholas I (1860–1910)
12 (9)	Jovan Plamenac (1873–1944)	April 17, 1907	April 15, 1909	1 year, 363 days	True People's Party	Lazar Tomanović (1907–1910)	Nicholas I (1860–1910)
13 (10)	Sekula Drljević (1884–1945)	April 15, 1909	February 6, 1910	298 days	True People's Party	Lazar Tomanović (1907–1910)	Nicholas I (1860–1910)
14 (11)	Pero Vučković	February 6, 1910	August 28, 1910	204 days	Independent	Lazar Tomanović (1907–1910)	Nicholas I (1860–1910)

==== Kingdom of Montenegro ====
Minister of Education and Ecclesiastical Affairs	Name (birth-death)	Mandate			Political party	Prime Minister	Monarch
Minister of Education and Ecclesiastical Affairs	Name (birth-death)	Start of position	End of position	Time in office	Political party	Prime Minister	Monarch
1 (11)	Pero Vučković	August 28, 1910	August 14, 1911	351 days	Independent	Lazar Tomanović (1910–1912)	Nicholas I (1910–1916)
2 (12)	Filip Jergović	August 14, 1911	August 23, 1911	9 days	True People's Party	Lazar Tomanović (1910–1912)	Nicholas I (1910–1916)
(6) (3)	Milo Dožić (1869–1919)	August 23, 1911	June 19, 1912	302 days	Independent	Lazar Tomanović (1910–1912)	Nicholas I (1910–1916)
(9) (4)	Jovan Plamenac (1873–1944)	June 19, 1912	May 8, 1913	323 days	True People's Party	Mitar Martinović (1912–1913)	Nicholas I (1910–1916)
5 (13)	Mirko M. Mijušković	May 8, 1913	April 25, 1914	353 days	Independent	Janko Vukotić (1913–1916)	Nicholas I (1910–1916)
(6)	Gavrilo Cerović (1877–1941)	April 25, 1914	January 2, 1916	1 year, 253 days	Independent	Janko Vukotić (1913–1916)	Nicholas I (1910–1916)
7 (14)	Marko Radulović (1866-1932)	January 2, 1916	January 15, 1916	13 days	People's Party	Lazar Mijušković (1916)	Nicholas I (1910–1916)

==== Montenegrin government-in-exile ====
Minister of Education and Ecclesiastical Affairs	Name (birth-death)	Mandate			Political party	Prime Minister	Regents	Monarch Titular king
Minister of Education and Ecclesiastical Affairs	Name (birth-death)	Start of position	End of position	Time in office	Political party	Prime Minister	Regents	Monarch Titular king
(14) (1)	Marko Radulović (1866-1932)	January 15, 1916	May 12, 1916	108 days	People's Party	Lazar Mijušković (1916)	Milena of Montenegro (1921–1923); Anto Gvozdenović (1921–1929)	Nicholas I (1916–1921)Danilo (March 1 – March 7 1921); Michael (1921–1929)
(11) (2)	Pero Vučković	May 12, 1916	January 17, 1917	250 days	Independent	Andrija Radović (1916–1917)	Milena of Montenegro (1921–1923); Anto Gvozdenović (1921–1929)	Nicholas I (1916–1921)Danilo (March 1 – March 7 1921); Michael (1921–1929)
3 (15)	Milutin Tomanović	January 17, 1917	June 11, 1917	145 days	Independent	Milo Matanović (1917)	Milena of Montenegro (1921–1923); Anto Gvozdenović (1921–1929)	Nicholas I (1916–1921)Danilo (March 1 – March 7 1921); Michael (1921–1929)
4 (16)	Veljko Milićević (1886-1929)	June 11, 1917	September 15, 1917	97 days	Independent	Evgenije Popović (1917–1919)	Milena of Montenegro (1921–1923); Anto Gvozdenović (1921–1929)	Nicholas I (1916–1921)Danilo (March 1 – March 7 1921); Michael (1921–1929)
5 (17)	Pero Šoć (1884-1966)	April 15, 1917	February 17, 1919	1 year, 146 days	Independent	Evgenije Popović (1917–1919)	Milena of Montenegro (1921–1923); Anto Gvozdenović (1921–1929)	Nicholas I (1916–1921)Danilo (March 1 – March 7 1921); Michael (1921–1929)
11 (6)	Pero Vučković	February 17, 1919	December 19, 1919	306 days	Independent	Jovan Plamenac (1919–1921)	Milena of Montenegro (1921–1923); Anto Gvozdenović (1921–1929)	Nicholas I (1916–1921)Danilo (March 1 – March 7 1921); Michael (1921–1929)
7 (17)	Pero Šoć (1884-1966)	December 19, 1919	June 28, 1921	1 year, 193 days	Independent	Jovan Plamenac (1919–1921)	Milena of Montenegro (1921–1923); Anto Gvozdenović (1921–1929)	Nicholas I (1916–1921)Danilo (March 1 – March 7 1921); Michael (1921–1929)
8 (18)	Vladimir Đ. Popović	June 28, 1921	September 14, 1922	1 year, 78 days	Independent	Milutin Vučinić (1921–1922)	Milena of Montenegro (1921–1923); Anto Gvozdenović (1921–1929)	Nicholas I (1916–1921)Danilo (March 1 – March 7 1921); Michael (1921–1929)
9 (19)	Pero Vučković	September 14, 1922	September 14, 1929	7 years	Independent	Anto Gvozdenović (1922–1929)	Milena of Montenegro (1921–1923); Anto Gvozdenović (1921–1929)	Nicholas I (1916–1921)Danilo (March 1 – March 7 1921); Michael (1921–1929)

== Ministers of Education, since 2006 ==
Democratic Party of Socialists Social Democrats Non-partisan

Minister	Start of term	End of term	Prime Minister	President
Slobodan Backović	10 November 2006	29 February 2008	Željko Šturanović (2006–2008)	Filip Vujanović (2006–2018)
Sreten Škuletić	29 February 2008	29 December 2010	Milo Đukanović (2008–2010)	Filip Vujanović (2006–2018)
Migo Stijepović	29 December 2010	14 March 2015	Igor Lukšić (2010–2012) Milo Đukanović (2012–2016)	Filip Vujanović (2006–2018)
Migo Stijepović	29 December 2010	14 March 2015	Milo Đukanović (2012–2016)	Filip Vujanović (2006–2018)
Predrag Bošković	14 March 2015	28 November 2016	Milo Đukanović (2012–2016)	Filip Vujanović (2006–2018)
Damir Šehović	28 November 2016	4 December 2020	Duško Marković (2016–2020)	Milo Đukanović (2018–2023)
Vesna Bratić	4 December 2020	28 April 2022	Zdravko Krivokapić (2020–2022)	Milo Đukanović (2018–2023)
Miomir Vojinović	28 April 2022	31 October 2023	Dritan Abazović (2022–2023)	Jakov Milatović (Since 2023)
Anđela Jakšić Stojanović	31 October 2023	incumbent	Milojko Spajić (Since 2023)	Jakov Milatović (Since 2023)
