= Andrej Milović =

Montenegrin politician

- Андреј Миловић

Minister of Justice
- In office 31 October 2023 – 25 July 2024
- Prime Minister: Milojko Spajić
- Preceded by: Marko Kovač

Member of the City Assembly of Podgorica
- In office 12 April 2023 – 10 May 2023

State Secretary in the Ministry of Justice and Human and Minority Rights
- In office January 2022 – May 2022
- Minister: Zdravko Krivokapić

Personal details
- Party: Independent (2024–present)
- Other political affiliations: Europe Now (2022–2024)
- Occupation: Lawyer, politician

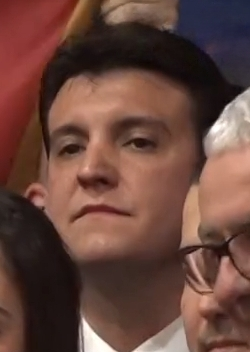
Milović in 2023

Andrej Milović was the Minister of Justice in the 44th Government of Montenegro from October 2023 until July 2024.

== Early life and education ==
Milović graduated from the Faculty of State and European Studies in Podgorica and specialized in European Studies at the Faculty of Political Science. He also graduated from the Faculty of Law, University of the Mediterranean, and specialized in the field of Judiciary at the Faculty of Law.

== Political career ==
In the 42nd Government, he served as the State Secretary of the Ministry of Justice, Human and Minority Rights, and was a member of the Prosecutorial Council of Montenegro. He became the State Secretary from the position of the Director of the Directorate for Blockchain and Cryptocurrencies at the Ministry of Finance and Social Welfare of the Government of Montenegro.

In August 2022, he joined the "Europe Now!" Movement (PES) and became a member of the party's Presidency, later appointed as the President of the Legal Council of PES. In 2024, he was excluded from the party following a disagreement with its president Milojko Spajić. He was removed from the position of Minister of Justice in July 2024, following the restructuring of the Government.

Milović contested the 2024 Podgorica City Assembly election as an independent candidate leading the "Podgorica List", but received only 515 votes, or 0.63%.
