= Jovan Plamenac =

Montenegrin and Yugoslav politician

- Јован Пламенац
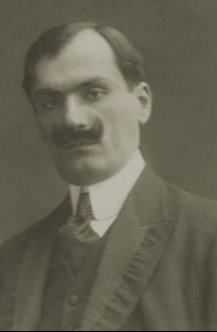

5th Prime Minister of the Kingdom of Montenegro in Exile
- In office 17 February 1919 – 28 June 1921
- Monarchs: Nicholas I Danilo; Michael
- Preceded by: Evgenije Popović
- Succeeded by: Milutin Vučinić

3rd president of the Popular Assembly of Kingdom of Montenegro
- In office 11 December 1911 – 25 October 1913
- Monarch: Nicholas I
- Preceded by: Milo Dožić
- Succeeded by: Milo Dožić

10th Minister of Education and Ecclesiastical Affairs of Principality of Montenegro
- In office 17 April 1907 – 15 April 1909
- Monarch: Nicholas I
- Prime Minister: Lazar Tomanović
- Preceded by: Gavrilo Cerović
- Succeeded by: Sekula Drljević

3rd and 5th Minister of Interior of Principality of Montenegro
- In office 15 April 1909 – 6 February 1910
- Monarch: Nicholas I
- Prime Minister: Lazar Tomanović
- Preceded by: Lakić Vojvodić
- Succeeded by: Lazar Tomanović
- In office 13 April 1910 – 28 August 1910
- Monarch: Nicholas I
- Prime Minister: Lazar Tomanović
- Preceded by: Lazar Tomanović
- Succeeded by: Himself (as Minister of Interior of Kingdom of Montenegro)

1st and 4th Minister of Interior of Kingdom of Montenegro
- In office 28 August 1910 – 13 September 1910
- Monarch: Nicholas I
- Prime Minister: Lazar Tomanović
- Preceded by: Himself (as Minister of Interior of Principality of Montenegro)
- Succeeded by: Filip Jergović
- In office 19 June 1912 – 8 May 1913
- Monarch: Nicholas I
- Prime Minister: Mitar Martinović
- Preceded by: Marko Đukanović
- Succeeded by: Labud Gojnić

4th Minister of Interior of Kingdom of Montenegro in Exile
- In office 17 February 1919 – 28 June 1921
- Monarchs: Nicholas I Danilo; Michael
- Prime Minister: Himself
- Preceded by: Nikola M. Hajduković
- Succeeded by: Milutin Vučinić

6th Minister of Foreign Affairs of Kingdom of Montenegro in Exile
- In office 17 February 1919 – 28 June 1921
- Monarch: Nicholas I
- Prime Minister: Himself
- Preceded by: Pero Soc
- Succeeded by: Pero Soc

Leader of the Greens of Kingdom of Montenegro
- In office 1 January 1919 – 14 June 1944 Serving with Krsto Popović and Novica Radović

Leader of True People's Party
- In office 1907–1918 Serving with Mitar Martinović and Lazar Mijušković

Personal details
- Born: 1873 Boljevići, Crmnica, Montenegro
- Died: 1944 (aged 71)
- Party: True People's Party
- Occupation: Politician, teacher

Jovan Simonov Plamenac (Serbian Cyrillic: Јован Симонов Пламенац; 1873–1944) was a Montenegrin and Yugoslav politician.

Starting out as a prominent leader of the True People's Party in the Principality of Montenegro, state that would soon transform into a kingdom, Plamenac was a staunch supporter of the country's monarch Prince Nikola Petrović-Njegoš who changed his role to king in 1910. As World War I broke out and King Nikola secretly fled the country after it got invaded by the Central powers, Plamenac denounced the king.

Following the war, Plamenac became one of the leaders of the Greens and one of the chief protagonists of the 1919 Christmas Rebellion in opposition to the post-war Montenegrin unification with Serbia and subsequent creation of the Kingdom of Serbs, Croats and Slovenes. Upon fleeing to Italy in wake of the failed rebellion, Plamenac became head of the Montenegrin authorities in exile. At the post he presided over units of exiled Greens who trained in the town of Gaeta with Italian support before being covertly shipped back home across the Adriatic where a low-level guerrilla insurgency continued even after the failed rebellion. Plamenac also tried to gain political support abroad for his organization's opposition to the newly created South Slavic state, but achieved very little in that regard.

By the mid-1920s, Plamenac did a complete turnaround, deciding to cut a deal with the Kingdom of SCS authorities, which allowed him to return home where he became a centrist politician with the People's Radical Party of Nikola Pašić.

== Early life ==
Jovan Plamenac was born in 1873 in the village of Boljevići (in Montenegro). He started his education in the Boljevići and Cetinje, later moving to Belgrade and Aleksinac, where he studied for a teacher. He graduated in Pakrac, in the Kingdom of Croatia-Slavonia (Austria-Hungary), before going to the German Empire and attending a two-year pedagogical course in Jena. After successfully completing it, he returned to Montenegro and became a teacher at the theological and teacher training school in Cetinje.

== Political career in Montenegro ==
From 1907 until 1909, Plamenac served as the Minister of Education in the government of Lazar Tomanović. During his time in office, he sought control over some military affairs allocated the Ministry of Interior until the government's mandate expired in 1910, when the Principality was transformed into a kingdom.

He was reemployed by Voivode Mitar Martinović as Minister of Internal Affairs and Representative of the Minister of Education during the crucial time of the Balkan Wars (1912–13). During the wars Montenegro secured most of its present-day territory from the Ottomans and a common border with Serbia was finally achieved, presenting the unification of the two realms as his top priority. During the following years of political dominance of the People's Party, he was a confidant of the Montenegrin court. After the Kingdom of Montenegro was invaded by the Central Powers during World War I and King Nikola I Petrović-Njegoš secretly fled the country to Italy, Plamenac denounced him heavily for treason and wrote for the Sarajevo's Bosnian Post on 6 April 1916 that it may be considered as if the king no longer exists.

Plamenac belonged to the faction of young and ambitious career civil servants who, unlike most of their generation, were absolutely loyal to the king and had a pro-regime political stance. They achieved their goals through intrigue, political marriages and nepotism. They were pejoratively known as Uskogaće (Tight-trousers) because of their forced and distasteful western European fashion, which they promoted as a modern concept at the time when national attire was still a main form of dressing in Montenegro. Plamenac and Sekula Drljević were the youngest ministers in Montenegrin governments during eight years of constitutional period.

== Christmas Uprising ==
By 1918, Montenegrin guerrillas devastated the occupying forces greatly and Allies broke into the country by the end of the year. With the resistance declaring a greater unified Serbian state and movements evidently being made towards Serbia's annexation of Montenegro, he became a fierce opponent of any sort of creation of Yugoslavia. After his political course lost at the Podgorica Assembly, which deposed King Nikola and declared unconditional unification with Serbia, he joined the "Greens" who refused to recognize the unification and resorted to armed rebellion in order to take power in Montenegro by force and expel the Serbians and other Allies. He placed Krsto Zrnov Popović as the commander-in-chief of the Greens. Upon hearing that an all-out armed rebellion is preparing, three days before the escalation of conflicts the Entente High Command authorized usage of force to defend the possible hot zones. On 1 January 1919 Plamenac's partisan unit attacked the town of Virpazar on Lake Skadar, but was repelled by Italian armed forces of Commandant Molinaro from Shkodër.

Receiving contact with Italian armed forces at the coastline and securing an amount of basic weaponry, as Italy had influential interests in Montenegro, the real insurgency was instigated around Cetinje's on 7 January 1919. It became known as the Christmas Rebellion. The Greens recruited peasants in the surrounding villages and quickly laid siege to Cetinje. But the Allies mounted fierce resistance, in particular the Montenegrin Youth of the pro-Serbian Whites and the French. The one-day battle was lost, between 20 and 30 Green draftees were killed and others were caught by the Allied forces. Other regiments like the one besieging Nikšić were defeated too, the remainder hid into the forests and started guerrilla resistance which continued over the following years, committing surprise attacks on the Whites and their supporters and Plamenac escaped to Albania to evade getting caught.

== In exile ==
Exiled King Nikola, living in the French town of Neuilly, publicly criticized the insurgency and called for all those who cherished his name and who remain loyal to him to lay down arms in the name of peace and no war between brothers. Also amazed by his capabilities, Nikola sacked Milo Matanović's eventually pro-Serbian cabinet and nominated Jovan Plamenac as the new Prime Minister of his government-in-exile on 17 February 1919, in which he was also the Minister of Foreign Affairs and Representative of the Minister of Internal Affairs.

During this time Plamenac complained greatly to the international community regarding the annexation of Montenegro, on the grounds of the lack of legality for such an act. He also complained about allegations of atrocities and brutal repression conducted by the French and Serbian forces in occupied Montenegro. The International Commission mandated by the Allied Powers and approved by the League of Nations failed to confirm this during its investigation in Montenegro, actually criticizing Plamenac and the Italians for escalation of conflicts and raising tensions in Montenegro. He also traveled as Nikola's envoy to London, hoping for some of the pro-Montenegrin sympathies of the United Kingdom's public. He managed to initiate a discussion over the Montenegrin question, raising the matter in the British House of Lords, but found no greater support in it. He also wrote to the President of the United States of America Woodrow Wilson on the terms to restore Montenegrin statehood, at least in the forms of a confederate Yugoslavia.

By 1920 in the Italian town of Gaeta a 1,500 men strong Army with 62 officers that was formed became financially backed by the Italian government, on the proposal of the Socialists. Plamenac's cabinet recognized the army as the legal Montenegrin Army in exile. These forces were covertly transferred to the eastern shore of the Adriatic Sea, where they instigated armed incidents in Montenegro, thus maintaining a form of open conflict. On 6 August 1919 the property of Andrija Radović, the orchestrator of Montenegrin–Serbian unification, was attacked and burnt to the ground, and his father was killed. Belgrade accused Plamenac of oppression.

By late 1920, the Constitutional Assembly elections took place in the Kingdom of Serbs, Croats and Slovenes; the Allied Powers had previously agreed to consider it a final self-determination event in Montenegro. International watchers from Britain and France concluded that the election was conducted with democratic standards and, in accordance to the fact that the strong majority of Montenegrins turned to vote despite the Greens' call for boycott, for a total victory in favour of unionism; the Great Powers broke off diplomatic relations to Plamenac's government-in-exile, giving a final blow to his premiership.

On 1 March 1921 Nicholas died of old age. His only son, crown prince Danilo, similarly to numerous other Montenegrin leaders in exile, expressed reluctance to accept the throne so he abdicated in favor of his nephew Mihailo and remained in anonymity in Rome. Mihailo was a minor, thus, in accordance to the Constitution, Jovan Plamenac declared himself co-Regent of the Kingdom together with Queen Milena Vukotić, Nikola's widow. The institutions were moved to San Remo in Italy, since France broke off relations and Italy, still having interests in the Adriatic, decided to financially back them. By June 1921 Plamenac went into a personal conflict with the Italian Foreign Minister Sforza, so he was forced to resign from the seat of PM, leaving it behind on 28 June 1921 to General Milutin Vučinić, but remained the key man behind as a member of the Regency. Vučinić surprisingly died soon, so the Queen invited to appoint General Anto Gvozdenović as the new PM.

== Return to Kingdom of SCS ==
Montenegrin Queen Regent Milena came from a strong pro-Serbian unionist family, so she eventually decided to disband the Montenegrin government-in-exile and abolish any Montenegrin resistance to Serbo-Croato-Slovene unity, and was also tired of the years of disputes and fighting. Fiercely opposing this, Plamenac and 20 armed men besieged and assaulted the Montenegrin Consulate at Riviera, Queen Milena's residing place, and stripped the Queen of her regency, forcefully taking control over the government-in-exile and the Montenegrin Archives, proclaiming himself supreme Premier. Although Italy considered it an internal problem, it did not want to allow a conflict on its soil, reported by contemporary Italian media as a "mini-civil war", so eventually pro-Milena Milo Vujović and his armed guards managed to secure the structures occupied by Plamenac and temporarily control the government before the formation of Gvozdenović's cabinet. Plamenac's belief was that the Queen Regent was not acting in the best Montenegrin interests and that she had had no jurisdiction on making such a crucial decision, being merely a regent of the underage King Danilo. However, Plamenac's acts did make the Queen Regent abandon her aims and the Montenegrin authorities in exile had continued to exist for roughly two more years.

Desperate and looking for support, Plamenac headed to Rome to found a special council for the restoration of Montenegrin sovereignty, separate from the main government-in-exile which was dominated more and more by a defeatist approach and had opened direct contact with the Yugoslav authorities. However, as this occurred in 1923, Italy quickly expelled him as after the Treaty of Rapallo it had abandoned its anti-Yugoslavian policies. Jovan Plamenac wanted to find refuge in the United States of America, announcing a foundation of an alternate Montenegrin government-in-exile in New York City. However, his Montenegrin papers were no longer recognized anywhere in the world, so he was detained on Ellis Island as an illegal immigrant.

In 1925, Plamenac gave up in futility and withdrew from the Regency, then taken over by Gvozdenović. In accordance to the rehabilitation program of King Alexander I Karađorđević, no charges were raised against Plamenac and he freely moved to Belgrade. On 31 January 1925, he wrote in repent and swore an oath of loyalty to the king:

Your Majesty, My entire political work was from first day of my public life dedicated to: glory, advancement and the magnitude of my Fatherland and my Dynasty, as well as the liberation and unification of the Serbian people. [..] In these holy works of mine for Montenegro and Serbdom, enemies were only those, who were, either enemies of Montenegro and her Dynasty, or of Serbdom.

Plamenac immediately enrolled the Yugoslavian political life as a member of the People's Radical Party of Nikola Pašić. He also became a Minister in the Kingdom's Government, causing an outburst of public controversy regarding his post, nevertheless King Alexander remained strictly supportive on the matter, as part of his rehabilitation program. After Pašić's death, Plamenac quickly advanced in the Radicals' hierarchy and became a vigorous supporter and advocate of its policies of centrism. He became the regime's champion in the political fights against the Peasants of the pro-Green Montenegrin Federalist Party, accusing it for separatism and support of Yugoslavia's destruction.

== World War II and death ==
Years after, in his old age, the Axis forces invaded Yugoslavia and partitioned it in 1941. Plamenac left Belgrade for the Italian governorate of Montenegro, an Axis puppet-state, and collaborated with Fascist Italy. In 1943, the Italian Fascists were defeated, and in 1944 the Communist Partisans caught Plamenac. He was subsequently read a verdict accusing him of collaboration and was then executed by a firing squad.

Preceded by Gavrilo Cerović	Minister of Education of Montenegro; 4 April 1907 – 2 April 1909	Succeeded by Sekula Drljević
Preceded by Lakić Vojvodić	Minister of Interior of Montenegro; 2 April 1909 – 24 January 1910	Succeeded by Marko Đukanović
Preceded by Marko Đukanović	Minister of Interior of Montenegro; 19 June 1912 – 8 May 1913	Succeeded by Labud Gojnić
Preceded by Evgenije Popović	Prime Minister of Montenegro in Exile; 17 February 1919 – 28 June 1921	Succeeded by Milutin Vučinić
