= Milo Matanović =

Serbian and Montenegrin military and politician

- Мило Матановић
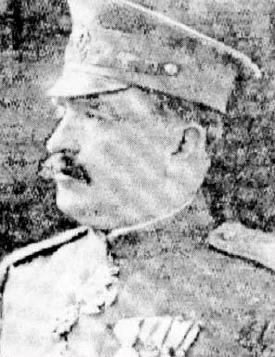
- Milo Matanović in 1913

3rd Prime Minister of Kingdom of Montenegro in-Exile
- In office 17 January 1917 – 11 June 1917
- Monarch: Nicholas I
- Preceded by: Andrija Radović
- Succeeded by: Evgenije Popović

2nd Minister of Interior of Kingdom of Montenegro in-Exile
- In office 17 January 1917 – 11 June 1917
- Monarch: Nicholas I
- Prime Minister: Himself
- Preceded by: Pero Vučković
- Succeeded by: Nikola M. Hajduković

2nd Minister of War of Kingdom of Montenegro in-Exile
- In office 12 May 1916 – 11 June 1917
- Monarch: Nicholas I
- Prime Minister: Andrija Radović; Himself
- Preceded by: Radomir Vešović
- Succeeded by: Niko Hajduković

Personal details
- Born: 27 November 1869
- Died: 12 May 1955 (85 aged)
- Citizenship: Principality of Montenegro; Kingdom of Montenegro
- Occupation: Politician and military

Military service
- Allegiance: Kingdom of Serbia; Kingdom of Montenegro
- Branch/service: Royal Serbian Army
- Rank: Brigadier
- Battles/wars: WW1

Milo Matanović (Serbian Cyrillic: Мило Матановић; 27 November 1869 – 12 May 1955) was a Serbian brigadier who formed a new government in Montenegro at the behest of King Nicholas I of Montenegro during World War I, but all to no avail. In Serbian historiography, Matanović is a patriotic figure. He also served as Minister of Defence and Minister of Interior of Kingdom of Montenegro from 1915 to 1917 before becoming president in 1917, but ultimately through political pressure was forced to resign.
