= Milutin Vučinić =

Montenegrin politician

- Милутин Вучинић
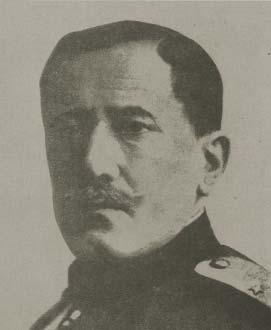
- Milutin Vučinić

6th Prime Minister of Kingdom of Montenegro in-Exile
- In office 28 June 1921 – 14 September 1922
- Monarch: Michael
- Regent: Milena of Montenegro
- Preceded by: Jovan Plamenac
- Succeeded by: Anto Gvozdenović

4th Minister of War of Kingdom of Montenegro in-Exile
- In office 17 February 1919 – 14 September 1922
- Monarchs: Nicholas I Danilo; Michael
- Prime Minister: Jovan Plamenac; Himself
- Regent: Milena of Montenegro
- Preceded by: Niko Hajduković
- Succeeded by: Đuro Jovović

4th Minister of Finance and Construction of Kingdom of Montenegro in-Exile
- In office 28 June 1921 – 14 September 1922
- Monarch: Michael
- Prime Minister: Himself
- Regent: Milena of Montenegro
- Preceded by: Milo Vujović
- Succeeded by: Pero Vucković

6th Minister of Interior of Kingdom of Montenegro in-Exile
- In office 28 June 1921 – 14 September 1922
- Monarch: Michael
- Prime Minister: Himself
- Regent: Milena of Montenegro
- Preceded by: Jovan Plamenac
- Succeeded by: Position abolished

Personal details
- Born: Милутин Мијајлов Вучинић; 12 April 1869 Gornji Rogami, Piperi, Principality of Montenegro
- Died: 14 September 1922 (aged 53) Rome, Kingdom of Italy
- Citizenship: Montenegro
- Party: True People's Party
- Domestic partner: Marija Vučinić (née Plamenac)
- Children: Dragutin, Niša and Vladimir (sons); Draginja and Darinka (daughter)
- Parent(s): Mijajlo Nišin Vučinić (father) and Marica Vučinić (née Marković; mother)
- Occupation: Politician and military
- Cabinet: Government of Milutin Vučinič

Military service
- Allegiance: Montenegro
- Branch/service: Montenegro Army
- Years of service: 1912-1922
- Rank: Soldier and brigadier general
- Commands: Spuž brigade
- Battles/wars: First Balkan War

Milutin Mijajlov Vučinić (Serbian Cyrillic: Милутин Мијајлов Вучинић; 12 April 1869 in Gornji Rogami, Piperi, Montenegro – 14 September 1922 in Rome, Italy) also known as Milutin Vučinić, was a Montenegrin soldier and politician.

== Biography ==
Vučinić was the son of brigadier Mijajlo Nišin Vučinić and Marica Vučinić (née Marković). He graduated from a military academy in Italy. During the First Balkan War, he commanded the Spuž brigade.

On 4/17 February 1919, Milutin Vučinić was appointed as Minister of the Military of the Government of the Kingdom of Montenegro in Exile, a position which he held until his death. On 15 June 1921, he was also named Minister of Finance of the Government in Exile, a position which he held until September 1922.

On 28 June 1922, he became the Prime Minister of the Kingdom of Montenegro in Exile.

Vučinić died of a heart attack on 14 September 1922 in Rome, at the age of 53. He was survived by his wife Marija Vučinić (née Plamenac), from Crmnica, his three sons: Dragutin, Niša and Vladimir, and his two daughters: Draginja and Darinka.
