= Novica Radović =

Montenegrin politician

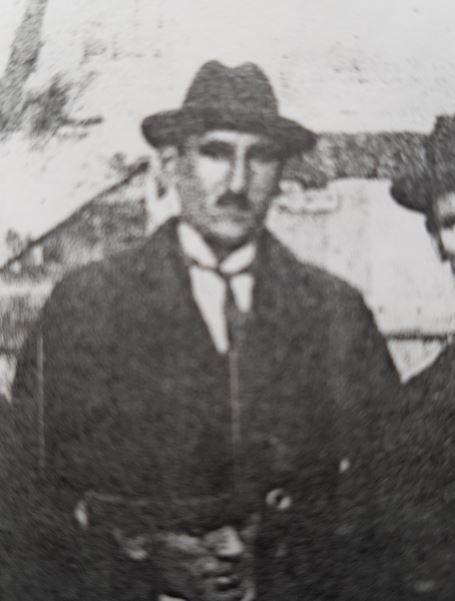
Novica Radović

Novica Radović (Serbian Cyrillic: Новица Радовић; born in Martinići in 1890 – died in Cetinje in 1945) was a Montenegrin politician.

Radović took part in 1919's Christmas Uprising on the side of the Greens, in an armed rebellion opposed to Montenegro's unconditional unification with Serbia in 1918 following the controversial Podgorica Assembly. Following the defeat of the Greens, he escaped to Albania and later to Italy, where he joined the Montenegrin Army in exile, becoming its Headquarters Intelligence supervisor.

He returned to what was then the Kingdom of Serbs, Croats and Slovenes in 1925. There he was charged with crimes against the state and sentenced to twenty years of imprisonment. After serving nine years of the sentence in Zenica prison, he was released, acquitted in 1934 after the assassination of King Alexander in Marseille which ended the dictatorship. After his release from prison, Radović moved to Podgorica, where he taught private classes and wrote political columns for the Zeta journal, and became a prominent member of the Montenegrin Federalist Party.

In 1941, Montenegro was reestablished as the Fascist Italian governorate of Montenegro. Despite the cooperative attitude of the Montenegrin Federalist Party towards Italy, Radović and his fraction remained ambivalent and made attempts to create some resistance to the occupying forces on certain issues. During this time Radović also acted as political adviser to Krsto Zrnov Popović. In 1945, Radović was executed by the Yugoslav Partisans under charges of Axis collaboration.

== Works ==
- Montenegro on the Allied Golgotha, 1938, Peć, Dukagjin Press
