= Filip Jergović =

Montenegrin politician

- Филип Јерговић

3rd Minister of Finance of Kingdom of Montenegro
- In office 14 September 1910 – 19 June 1912
- Monarch: Nicholas I
- Prime Minister: Lazar Tomanović
- Preceded by: Dušan Vukotić
- Succeeded by: Sekula Drljević

2nd Minister of Interior of Kingdom of Montenegro
- In office 13 September 1910 – 14 September 1910
- Monarch: Nicholas I
- Prime Minister: Lazar Tomanović
- Preceded by: Jovan Plamenac
- Succeeded by: Marko Djukanović

2nd Minister of Education and Ecclesiastical Affairs of Kingdom of Montenegro
- In office 14 August 1911 – 23 August 1911
- Monarch: Nicholas I
- Prime Minister: Lazar Tomanović
- Preceded by: Pero Vucković
- Succeeded by: Milo Dožić

Personal details
- Citizenship: Principality of Montenegro; Kingdom of Montenegro
- Party: True People's Party
- Education: Zagreb and Vienna

Filip Jergović (Serbian Cyrillic: Филип Јерговић) was the Minister of Finance of the Kingdom of Montenegro from September 1910 to June 1912, being succeeded by Sekula Drljević, Minister of Interior of Kingdom of Montenegro from 13 September until 14 September 1910, being succeeded by Marko Djuvanović, and Minister of Education of Kingdom of Montenegro from 14 August until 23 August 1911, being succeeded by Milo Dožić, during the 2nd, 3rd and 4th governments of Lazar Tomanović He was educated in Zagreb and Vienna.
