= Ministry of Justice and Human and Minority Rights =

Government ministry of Montenegro

Ministry of Justice and Human and Minority Rights of Montenegro
- Ministarstvo pravde, ljudskih i manjinskih prava

Agency overview
- Formed: 1991 (2020)
- Jurisdiction: Government of Montenegro
- Headquarters: Vuka Karadžića 3, Podgorica
- Agency executive: Andrej Milović, Minister of Justice and Human and Minority Rights
- Website: pravda.gov.me

The Ministry of Justice in the Government of Montenegro (Montenegrin: Ministarstvo Pravde u Vladi Crne Gore / Министарство Праве у Влади Црне Горе, MPVCG) is the ministry in the Government of Montenegro which is in charge of the nation's justice system and human and minority rights.

== Ministers of Justice since 1879 ==
=== Montenegrin monarchy ===
==== Principality of Montenegro ====
Image	Beginning of the mandate	End of mandate	Time in office	Name and surname	Notes	Prince
	March 20, 1879	1893	13-14 years	Božo Petrović-Njegoš		Nicholas I (1860–1910)
	1893	November 25, 1899	5-6 years	Valtazar Bogišić		Nicholas I (1860–1910)
	November 25, 1899	June 3, 1903	3 years, 190 days	Lujo Vojnović		Nicholas I (1860–1910)
	June 3, 1903	October 2, 1904	One year, 122 days	Miloš Đ. Shaulic	First as a manager, then as a minister	Nicholas I (1860–1910)
	October 2, 1904	December 19, 1905	One year, 78 days	Božo Petrović-Njegoš	as representative of the Minister	Nicholas I (1860–1910)
	December 19, 1905	November 24, 1906	340 days	Milo Dožić		Nicholas I (1860–1910)
	November 24, 1906	February 1, 1907	69 days	Milosav R. Raičević		Nicholas I (1860–1910)
	February 1, 1907	April 17, 1907	75 days	Gavrilo Cerović		Nicholas I (1860–1910)
	April 17, 1907	April 15, 1909	1 year, 363 days	Lazar Tomanović		Nicholas I (1860–1910)
	April 15, 1909	February 6, 1910	298 days	Sekula Drljević		Nicholas I (1860–1910)
	February 6, 1910	April 13, 1910	65 days	Pero Vučković	represented	Nicholas I (1860–1910)
	April 13, 1910	August 28, 1910	139 days	Lazar Tomanović	represented	Nicholas I (1860–1910)

==== Kingdom of Montenegro ====
Image	Beginning of the mandate	End of mandate	Time in office	Name and surname	Notes	Monarch
	August 28, 1910	August 23, 1911	360 days	Lazar Tomanović	represented	Nicholas I (1910–1916)
	August 23, 1911	June 19, 1912	302 days	Milo Dožić		Nicholas I (1910–1916)
	June 19, 1912	May 8, 1913	323 days	Dušan Vukotić	Government of Mitar Martinović	Nicholas I (1910–1916)
	May 8, 1913	January 2, 1916	2 years, 239 days	Ljubomir Bakić		Nicholas I (1910–1916)
	January 2, 1916	January 15, 1916	13 days	Marko Radulović		Nicholas I (1910–1916)

==== Montenegrin government-in-exile ====
Image	Beginning of the mandate	End of mandate	Time in office	Name and surname	Notes	Regent	Monarch Titular king
	January 15, 1916	May 12, 1916	108 days	Marko Radulović		Milena of Montenegro (1921–1923); Anto Gvozdenović (1921–1929)	Nicholas I (1916–1921) Danilo (March 1-March 7, 1921); Michael (1921–1929)
	May 12, 1916	January 17, 1917	250 days	Janko Spasojevic		Milena of Montenegro (1921–1923); Anto Gvozdenović (1921–1929)	Nicholas I (1916–1921) Danilo (March 1-March 7, 1921); Michael (1921–1929)
	January 17, 1917	June 11, 1917	145 days	Stanisa Ilić		Milena of Montenegro (1921–1923); Anto Gvozdenović (1921–1929)	Nicholas I (1916–1921) Danilo (March 1-March 7, 1921); Michael (1921–1929)
	June 11, 1917	September 15, 1917	97 days	Veljko Milićević		Milena of Montenegro (1921–1923); Anto Gvozdenović (1921–1929)	Nicholas I (1916–1921) Danilo (March 1-March 7, 1921); Michael (1921–1929)
	September 15, 1917	June 28, 1921	3 years, 287 days	Pero Šoć	represented	Milena of Montenegro (1921–1923); Anto Gvozdenović (1921–1929)	Nicholas I (1916–1921) Danilo (March 1-March 7, 1921); Michael (1921–1929)
	June 28, 1921	September 14, 1922	One year, 78 days	Vladimir Đ. Popović		Milena of Montenegro (1921–1923); Anto Gvozdenović (1921–1929)	Nicholas I (1916–1921) Danilo (March 1-March 7, 1921); Michael (1921–1929)
	September 14, 1922	September 14, 1929	7 years	Pero Vučković		Milena of Montenegro (1921–1923); Anto Gvozdenović (1921–1929)	Nicholas I (1916–1921) Danilo (March 1-March 7, 1921); Michael (1921–1929)

== Ministers of Justice, since 1991 ==
Name (Birth–Death)	Party	Term of Office	
Momčilo Knežević (born 1951)	DPS	15 February 1991	6 October 1992
Filip Vujanović (born 1954)	DPS	6 October 1992	17 May 1995
Miodrag Latković	none	17 May 1995	16 July 1998
Dragan Šoć (born 1957)	NS	16 July 1998	28 February 2001
Željko Šturanović (1960–2014)	DPS	28 February 2001	10 November 2006
Miraš Radović (born 1951)	none	10 November 2006	29 December 2010
Duško Marković (born 1958)	DPS	29 December 2010	12 May 2016
Zoran Pažin (born 1966)	none	12 May 2016	2 December 2020
Vladimir Leposavić (born 1984)	none	2 December 2020	17 June 2021
Zdravko Krivokapić (Note: Acting Minister of Justice and Human and Minority Rights of Montenegro) (born 1958)	none	17 June 2021	1 July 2021
Sergej Sekulović (born 1978)	none	1 July 2021	24 January 2022
Zdravko Krivokapić (Acting) (born 1958)	none	24 January 2022	28 April 2022
Marko Kovač (born 1985)	SNP	28 April 2022	31 October 2023
Andrej Milović	none	31 October 2023	Incumbent
