= Ministry of Finance (Montenegro) =

Government ministry of Montenegro

- Ministarstvo finansija

Agency overview
- Formed: 1879
- Jurisdiction: Government of Montenegro
- Headquarters: Stanka Dragojevića 2, Podgorica
- Agency executive: Novica Vuković, Minister of Finance
- Website: www.mif.gov.me

The Ministry of Finance in the Government of Montenegro (Montenegrin: Ministarstvo finansija u Vladi Crne Gore / Министарство финансија у Влади Црне Горе, MFVCG) is the ministry in the Government of Montenegro which is in charge of the nation's finances. The ministry was established in 1879 as a ministry of the Principality of Montenegro. It was abolished in late 1922, but restored 23 years later, in 1945. Since 2023 the Minister has been Novica Vuković.

== Ministers ==
Non-party True People's Party People's Party League of Communists Democratic Party of Socialists Social Democratic Party

| Minister | Start of term | End of term | Notes |
|---|---|---|---|
| Đuro Cerović | 20 March 1879 | 1882 | |
| Nikola Đ. Matanović | 1882 | 3 June 1903 | |
| Lazar Mijušković | 3 June 1903 | 19 December 1905 | |
| Andrija Radović | 19 December 1905 | 24 November 1906 | |
| Mitar Đurović | 24 November 1906 | 1 February 1907 | |
| Andrija Radović | 1 February 1907 | 17 April 1907 | |
| Dušan Vukotić | 17 April 1907 | 14 September 1910 | |
| Filip Jergović | 14 September 1910 | 19 June 1912 | |
| Sekula Drljević | 19 June 1912 | 8 May 1913 | |
| Risto Popović | 8 May 1913 | 11 September 1915 | |
| Mirko Mijušković | 11 September 1915 | 2 January 1916 | |
| Andrija Radović | 2 January 1916 | 17 January 1917 | |
| Staniša Iljić | 17 January 1917 | 11 June 1917 | |
| Milo Vujović | 11 June 1917 | 28 June 1921 | |
| Milutin Vučinić | 28 June 1921 | 14 September 1922 | |
| Pero Vučković | 14 September 1922 | 14 September 1929 | |
Part of Ministry of Finance of Yugoslavia (until 1945)
| Gojko Garčević | 17 April 1945 | 7 November 1951 | |
| Jefto Šćepanović | 7 November 1951 | 4 February 1953 | |
| Vlado Raičević | 4 February 1953 | 9 May 1955 | |
| Nikola Đakonović | 9 May 1955 | 15 February 1958 | |
| Vojin Jauković | 15 April 1958 | 8 April 1959 | |
| Aleksandar Radević | 8 April 1959 | 17 September 1962 | |
| Vlado Jovanović | 17 September 1962 | 25 June 1963 | |
| Mustafa Redžepagić | 25 June 1963 | 9 April 1965 | |
| Dragiša Đoković | 9 April 1965 | 7 May 1969 | |
| Milivoje Drecun | 8 April 1969 | 6 May 1974 | |
| Vuk Ognjanović | 6 May 1974 | 28 April 1978 | |
| Velimir Šljivančanin | 28 April 1978 | 6 May 1986 | |
| Branimir Pajković | 6 May 1986 | 29 March 1989 | |
| Slavko Drljević | 29 March 1989 | 21 March 1990 | |
| Božidar Gazivoda | 21 March 1990 | 17 October 1993 | |
| Predrag Goranović | 17 May 1994 | 16 July 1998 | |
| Miroslav Ivanišević | 16 July 1998 | 16 February 2004 | |
| Igor Lukšić | 16 February 2004 | 29 December 2010 | |
| Milorad Katnić | 29 December 2010 | 4 December 2012 | |
| Radoje Žugić | 4 December 2012 | 12 May 2016 | |
| Raško Konjević | 12 May 2016 | 28 November 2016 | |
| Darko Radunović | 28 November 2016 | 4 December 2020 | |
| Milojko Spajić | 4 December 2020 | 28 April 2022 | |
| Aleksandar Damjanović | 28 April 2022 | 31 October 2023 | |
| Novica Vucković | 31 October 2023 | Incumbent | |
