= Ministry of Internal Affairs (Montenegro) =

Government ministry of Montenegro

- Ministarstvo unutrašnjih poslova

Agency overview
- Formed: 1831 (1991)
- Jurisdiction: Government of Montenegro
- Headquarters: Podgorica
- Agency executive: Danilo Šaranović, Minister of Internal Affairs
- Website: mup.gov.me

The Ministry of Internal Affairs (Montenegrin: Ministarstvo Unutrašnjih Poslova Crne Gore / Министарство унутрашњих послова) is a Ministry in the Government of Montenegro, tasked with oversight and strategic planning of law enforcement apparatus in Montenegro, including budgetary oversight and internal affairs, as well as direct control over disaster relief and emergency situations management, maintaining citizen, vehicle and firearms databases, issuance of ID cards, passports, driving and firearms licences. It also has certain jurisdiction over border security management, and operates police aviation unit.

== History ==
Historically, Ministry was the main arm of law enforcement and state intelligence. However, in 2005 the intelligence arm split and became and independent agency, while law enforcement became fully operationally independent, as Police Administration.

== Ministers of Internal Affairs since 1879 ==
=== Montenegrin monarchy ===
==== Principality of Montenegro ====
Image	Beginning of the mandate	End of mandate	Time in office	Name and surname	Notes	Prince
	March 20, 1879	1884	4–5 years	Mašo Vrbica	Minister of the Interior of the government of Božo Petrović-Njegoš	Nicholas I (1860-1910)
	1884	December 19, 1905	10–11 years	Božo Petrović-Njegoš	Minister of the Interior of the government of Božo Petrović-Njegoš	Nicholas I (1860-1910)
	December 19, 1905	November 24, 1906	69 days	Labud Gojnić	Minister of the Interior in the Prime Minister of Lazar Mijušković	Nicholas I (1860-1910)
	November 24, 1906	April 17, 1907	144 days	Mihailo Ivanović	Minister of the Interior during the government of Marko Radulović and the first government of Andrija Radović	Nicholas I (1860-1910)
	April 17, 1907	April 15, 1909	1 year, 363 days	Lakić Vojvodić	Minister of the Interior in the Prime Minister of Lazar Tomanović	Nicholas I (1860-1910)
	April 15, 1909	February 6, 1910	298 days	Jovan Plamenac	Minister of the Interior in the second government of Lazar Tomanović	Nicholas I (1860-1910)
	February 6, 1910	April 13, 1910	70 days	Lazar Tomanović	Minister of the Interior in the second government of Lazar Tomanović	Nicholas I (1860-1910)
	April 13, 1910	August 28, 1910	134 days	Jovan Plamenac	Minister of the Interior in the second government of Lazar Tomanović	Nicholas I (1860-1910)

==== Kingdom of Montenegro ====
Image	Beginning of the mandate	End of term	Time in office	Name and surname	Notes	Monarch
	August 28, 1910	September 13, 1910	15 days	Jovan Plamenac	In the second government of Lazar Tomanović, he served as Minister of the Interior at the time when Montenegro was elevated to the level of a kingdom .	Nicholas I (1910-1916)
	September 13, 1910	September 14, 1910	1 day	Filip Jergović	Minister of the Interior in the second government of Lazar Tomanović	Nicholas I (1910-1916)
	September 14, 1910	June 19, 1912	1 year, 279 days	Marko Đukanović	Minister of the Interior in the third and fourth governments of Lazar Tomanović	Nicholas I (1910-1916)
	June 19, 1912	May 8, 1913	323 days	Jovan Plamenac	Minister of the Interior of the Government of Mitar Martinović	Nicholas I (1910-1916)
	May 8, 1913	April 25, 1914	352 days	Labud Gojnić	Minister of the Interior of the First Government of Janko Vukotić	Nicholas I (1910-1916)
	April 25, 1914	January 2, 1916	1 year, 252 days	Savo Vuletić	Minister of the Interior in the second and third governments of Janko Vukotić	Nicholas I (1910-1916)
	January 2, 1916	January 15, 1916	13 days	Risto Popović	Minister of the Interior in the second government of Lazar Mijušković	Nicholas I (1910-1916)

==== Montenegrin government-in-exile ====
Image	Beginning of the mandate	End of term	Time in office	Name and surname	Notes	Regent	Monarch Titular king
	January 15, 1916	May 12, 1916	98 days	Risto Popović	Minister of the Interior in the second government of Lazar Mijušković in exile	Milena of Montenegro (1921-1922)	Nicholas I (1916-1921); Danilo (March 1-March 7, 1921); Michael (1921-1922)
	May 12, 1916	January 17, 1917	250 days	Pero Vučković	Minister of the Interior of the Second Government of Andrija Radović	Milena of Montenegro (1921-1922)	Nicholas I (1916-1921); Danilo (March 1-March 7, 1921); Michael (1921-1922)
	January 17, 1917	June 11, 1917	145 days	Milo Matanović	Minister of the Interior of the government of Milo Matanović	Milena of Montenegro (1921-1922)	Nicholas I (1916-1921); Danilo (March 1-March 7, 1921); Michael (1921-1922)
	June 11, 1917	March 2, 1919	1 year, 264 days	Nikola M. Hajduković	Minister of the Interior of the Government of Evgenije Popović	Milena of Montenegro (1921-1922)	Nicholas I (1916-1921); Danilo (March 1-March 7, 1921); Michael (1921-1922)
	March 2, 1919	June 28, 1921	2 years, 119 days	Jovan Plamenac	Minister of the Interior in the first, second and third governments of Jovan Plamenac	Milena of Montenegro (1921-1922)	Nicholas I (1916-1921); Danilo (March 1-March 7, 1921); Michael (1921-1922)
	June 28, 1921	September 14, 1922	1 year, 78 days	Milutin Vučinić	Minister of the Interior of the government of Milutin Vučinić	Milena of Montenegro (1921-1922)	Nicholas I (1916-1921); Danilo (March 1-March 7, 1921); Michael (1921-1922)

== Ministers of Internal Affairs since 1991 ==
Name (Birth–Death)	Party	Term of Office	
Pavle Bulatović (1948-2000)	DPS	15 February 1991	1 August 1992
Nikola Pejaković (born 1952)	DPS	1 August 1992	17 May 1995
Filip Vujanović (born 1954)	DPS	17 May 1995	5 February 1998
Vukašin Maraš (1938-2008)	DPS	5 February 1998	2 July 2001
Andrija Jovićević (born 1963)	none	2 July 2001	8 January 2003
Milan Filipović (born 1937)	none	8 January 2003	18 December 2003
Dragan Đurović (1959-2024)	DPS	18 December 2003	25 October 2005
Jusuf Kalamperović (born 1959)	SDP	25 October 2005	10 June 2009
Ivan Brajović (born 1962)	SDP	10 June 2009	4 December 2012
Raško Konjević (born 1979)	SDP	4 December 2012	12 May 2016
Goran Danilović (born 1971)	Demos	12 May 2016	28 November 2016
Mevludin Nuhodžić (born 1959)	DPS	28 November 2016	4 December 2020
Sergej Sekulović (born 1978)	none	4 December 2020	28 April 2022
Filip Adžić (born 1986)	URA	28 April 2022	Present
