= Lazar Tomanović =

Serbian writer, politician and diplomat

- Лазар Томановић
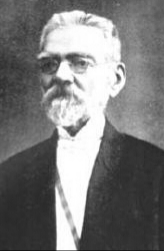

5th Prime Minister of Principality of Montenegro 4th president of the Ministerial Council of Principality of Montenegro
- In office 17 April 1907 – 28 August 1910
- Monarch: Nicholas I
- Preceded by: Andrija Radović
- Succeeded by: Mitar Martinović

1st Prime Minister of Kingdom of Montenegro 1st president of the Ministerial Council of Kingdom of Montenegro
- In office 28 August 1910 – 19 July 1912
- Monarch: Nicholas I
- Preceded by: Himself (as Prime Minister or Principality of Montenegro)
- Succeeded by: Mitar Martinović

7th Minister of Internal Affairs of Principality of Montenegro
- In office 15 April 1909 – 6 February 1910
- Monarch: Nicholas I
- Prime Minister: Himself
- Preceded by: Jovan Plamenac
- Succeeded by: Jovan Plamenac

9th and 12th Minister of Justice of Principality of Montenegro
- In office 17 May 1907 – 15 May 1909
- Monarch: Nicholas I
- Prime Minister: Himself
- Preceded by: Gavrilo M. Cerovic
- Succeeded by: Sekula Drljević
- In office 13 April 1910 – 28 August 1910
- Monarch: Nicholas I
- Prime Minister: Himself
- Preceded by: Baina Vucković
- Succeeded by: Himself (as Minister of Justice of Kingdom of Montenegro)

1st Minister of Justice of Kingdom of Montenegro
- In office 28 August 1910 – 24 August 1911
- Monarch: Nicholas I
- Prime Minister: Himself
- Preceded by: Himself (as Minister of Justice of Principality of Montenegro)
- Succeeded by: Milo Dožić

6th Minister of Foreign Affairs of Principality of Montenegro
- In office 17 April 1907 – 28 August 1910
- Monarch: Nicholas I
- Prime Minister: Himself
- Preceded by: Andrija Radović
- Succeeded by: Himself (as Minister of Foreign Affairs of Kingdom of Montenegro)

1st Minister of Foreign Affairs of Kingdom of Montenegro
- In office 28 August 1910 – 24 August 1911
- Monarch: Nicholas I
- Prime Minister: Himself
- Preceded by: Himself (as Minister of Foreign Affairs of Kingdom of Montenegro)
- Succeeded by: Dušan Gregović

Personal details
- Born: 3 September 1845 Lepetane, Herceg Novi, Dalmatia, Austrian Empire
- Died: 2 November 1932 (aged 87) Jošice, Herceg Novi, Zeta Banovina, Yugoslavia
- Party: Independent

Lazar Tomanović (Serbian Cyrillic: Лазар Томановић; 3 September 1845 – 2 November 1932) was a Serbian writer, politician and diplomat, who served as the fifth Prime Minister of Montenegro, as well the first Prime Minister of the Kingdom of Montenegro, under the regime of King Nikola I.

== Biography ==
=== Early life and education ===
Lazar Tomanović was born on 3 September 1845 in Lepetane, a village near Herceg Novi in Bay of Kotor. At the time it was part of the Kingdom of Dalmatia within the Austrian Empire. Having finished elementary and secondary school in Herceg Novi, Tomanović studied in Novi Sad and Budapest and received his doctorate in law in Graz. He was a member of Parliament of Dalmatia (Diet) as representative of Serb People's Party in the Kingdom of Dalmatia.

=== Prime Minister of Montenegro ===
He became Prime Minister of Montenegro with support of Royalist True People's Party in April 1907 and held the office for several terms until June 1912. He also served Minister of Foreign Affairs and Minister of Justice of Montenegro. During his second term, Montenegro was proclaimed a sovereign kingdom.
