= Montenegro–Serbia relations =

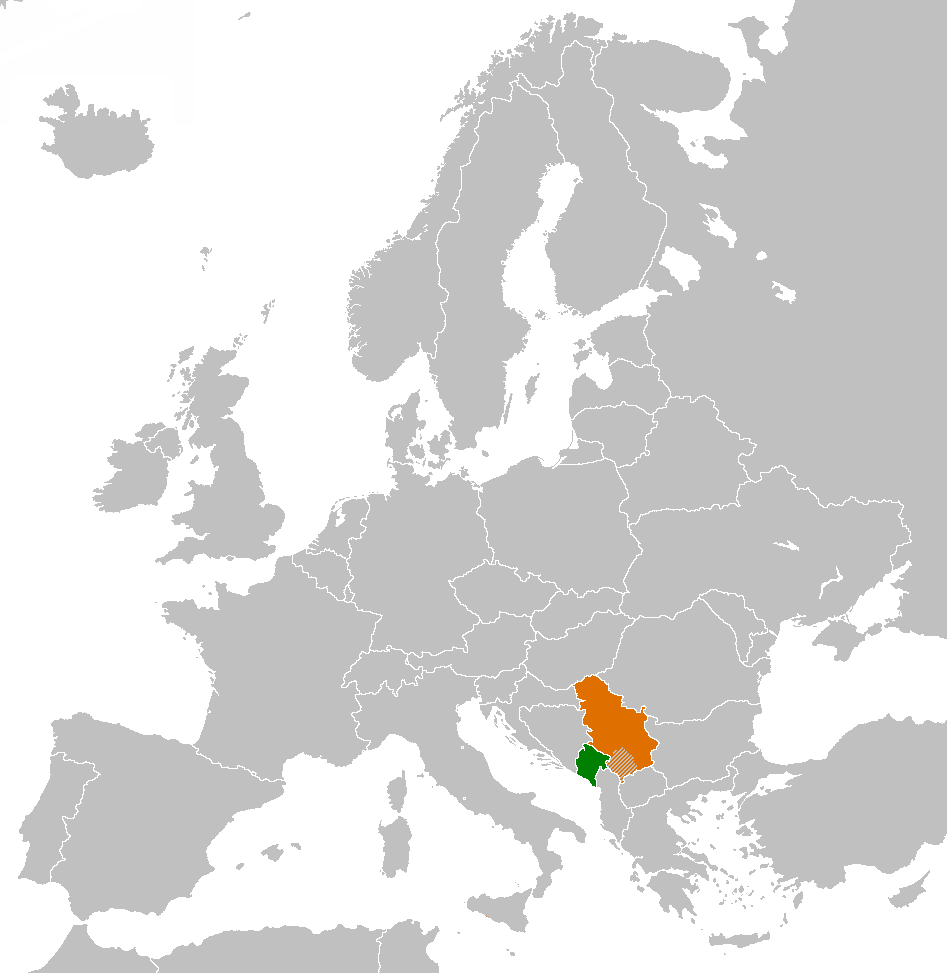

- Montenegro: Serbia

Montenegro and Serbia maintain diplomatic relations established in 1879. Both were part of the Kingdom of Yugoslavia (1918–1941) and later the Socialist Federal Republic of Yugoslavia (1945–1992). After Yugoslavia’s dissolution in 1991-1992, they formed the Federal Republic of Yugoslavia which was in 2003 reconstituted into the State Union of Serbia and Montenegro. The Montenegrin independence referendum in 2006, resulting in restoration of both countries' independence, marked a political divergence, but cultural ties between Serbia and Montenegro remain exceptionally strong.

The two countries have a deep historical and cultural connection, rooted in the centuries of intertwined history. The peoples of Serbia and Montenegro share common cultural traditions, including religion (majority in both countries adhere to the Serbian Orthodox Church) and language (vast majority in Serbia and relative majority in Montenegro speak Serbian as a mother tongue). About two million people in Serbia have partial or full ancestry from present-day Montenegro, mostly tracing back to the 18th and 19th centuries, vast majority of whom identify ethnically as Serb, though many (particularly first- or second-generation descendants from Montenegro) also claim a fairly strong Montenegrin regional identity. This closeness between Serbia and Montenegro causes sporadic debates on the Montenegrin ethnic and linguistic identity centering on a core question whether Montenegrins are essentially the same people as Serbs or distinct ethnicity.

== History ==
=== Medieval period ===
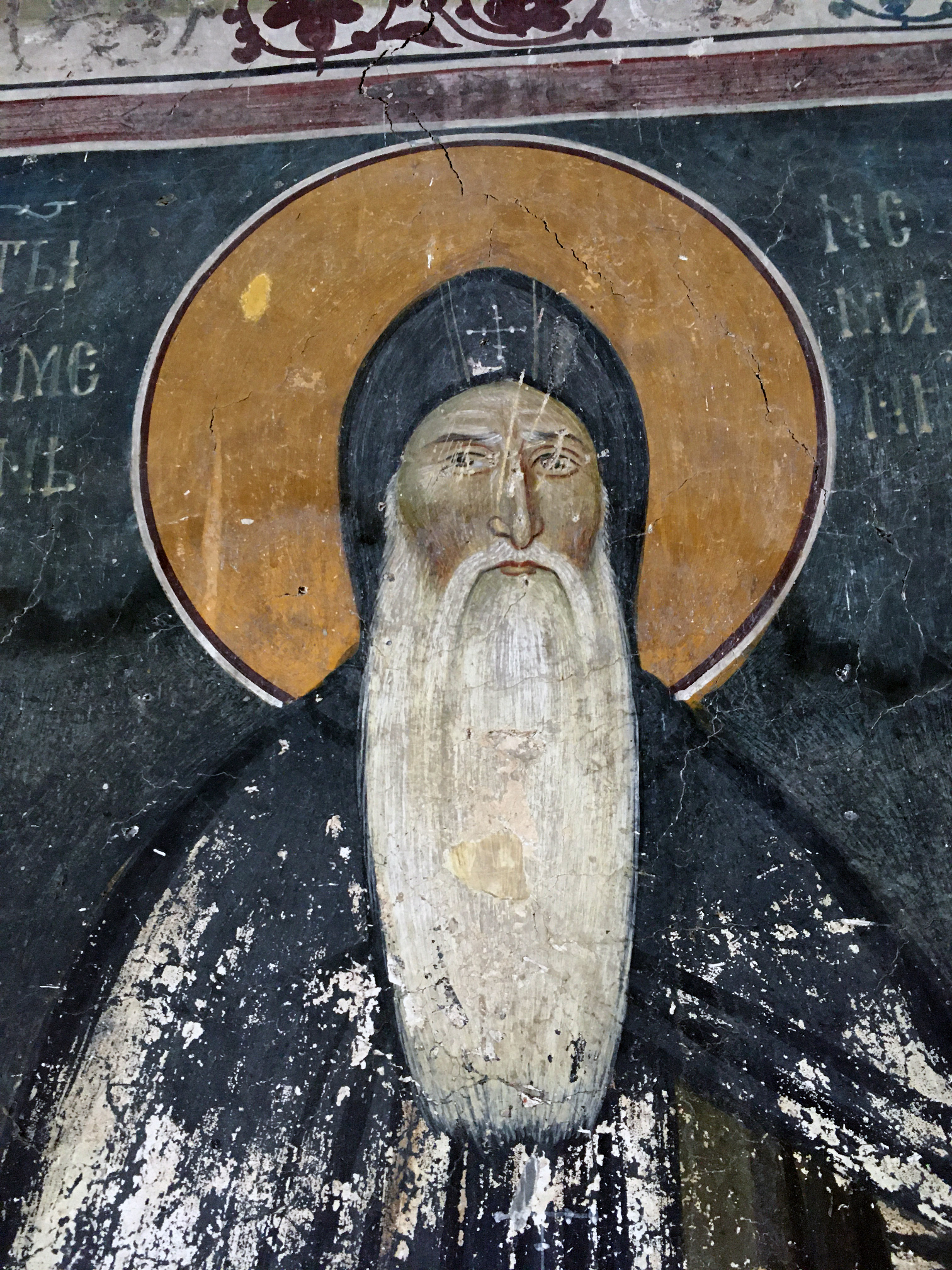
Fresco of Stefan Nemanja, Grand Prince of the Serbian Grand Principality and founder of Nemanjić dynasty, born and raised in Ribnica, present-day Podgorica

Duklja was a medieval South Slavic polity (10th–12th centuries) centred in modern-day Montenegro, around Lake Skadar and Zeta. Byzantine sources, such as those by John Skylitzes, referred to Duklja’s rulers (e.g., Stefan Vojislav) as "leaders of Serbs", indicating a Serb ethnic character. Duklja is often framed as a distinct proto-Montenegrin state by modern Montenegrin national narratives. Serbian historiography generally considers Duklja a Serb state, part of the medieval Serb political and cultural sphere, with its rulers and population integrated into the later Nemanjić state. Most historians agree that Duklja was at least partially a Serb state, particularly under the Vojislavljević dynasty, but its precise identity remains contested due to the complex ethnic and political landscape of the medieval Balkans.

By the late 11th and early 12th centuries, Duklja weakened due to internal strife and Byzantine interventions. Raška emerged as the leading Serbian state. Duklja, increasingly referred to as Zeta, was gradually absorbed into Raška’s sphere and by the late 12th century, Zeta was integrated into the Serbian Kingdom (proclaimed in 1217) and later the Serbian Empire under Stefan Dušan. Zeta was governed by Serbian nobles or royal heirs, such as Dušan’s son, Stefan Uroš, who was titled "King of Zeta". After Stefan Dušan’s death in 1355, the Serbian Empire fragmented. Zeta regained semi-independence under local dynasties like the Balšić noble family, who ruled as Serb lords but pursued their own policies.

By the 15th century, both Zeta and Serbia faced Ottoman expansion. Zeta, under the Crnojević noble family, maintained some independence longer than Serbia, which fell to the Ottomans in 1459. Zeta’s rulers sought Venetian and Hungarian support, diverging from Serbia’s path. The Crnojevićs still identified as Serbs, and Zeta’s Orthodox heritage aligned with Serbian traditions.

=== Ottoman rule ===
The relations between Serbia and Montenegro from 16th to 18th centuries were influenced by geographical separation and limited direct interaction due to Ottoman rule dominance. During this period, "Montenegro" refers primarily to the region of Old Montenegro (rugged highlands around Cetinje), governed by the Petrović-Njegoš dynasty, while "Serbia" refers to areas under Ottoman control, particularly the Pashalik of Belgrade. At this time there was very little distinction between Serbs and Montenegrins, if any. The Metropolitanate of Montenegro and the Littoral, eparchy under constant jurisdiction of the Serbian Patriarchate of Peć, directly influenced the establishment of the Prince-Bishopric of Montenegro in 1697. While nominally under Ottoman suzerainty, Montenegro’s mountainous terrain and tribal organization allowed it to maintain de facto autonomy and to resist direct Ottoman control. Montenegro’s autonomy allowed it to act as a symbol of resistance against Ottoman rule, inspiring Serbs in Ottoman-controlled Serbia.

=== XIX century ===
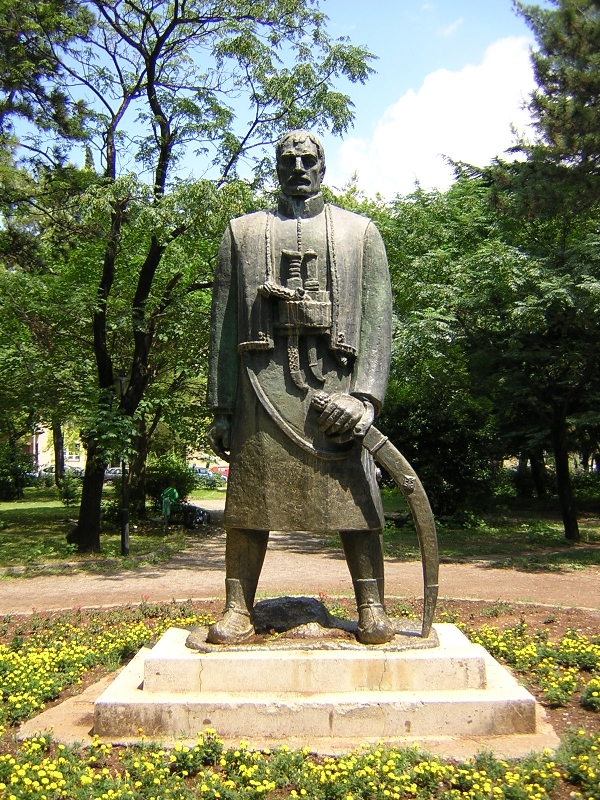
Statue of Karađorđe, Podgorica

Serbia, following the Serbian Revolution, gained partial autonomy under Miloš Obrenović, formalized by the Ottoman decrees of 1830 and 1833. Montenegro, under the rule of the Petrović-Njegoš dynasty, operated as a de facto independent theocratic state, though it lacked international recognition. While both shared anti-Ottoman goals, direct military or political coordination was minimal due to geographical separation and Montenegro’s isolation. However, Montenegro’s rulers expressed solidarity with uprisings during the Serbian Revolution, and Petar I Petrović-Njegoš corresponded with leader of the First Serbian Uprising, Karađorđe.

From 1830s through 1860s, Serbia pursued cautious modernization and diplomacy within the Ottoman framework, while Montenegro adopted a more militant, confrontational approach. This led to occasional tensions, as Serbia was wary of provoking the Ottomans, whereas Montenegro openly defied them. Montenegro occasionally sought Serbia’s support in its conflicts with the Ottomans, such as during clashes in the 1840s. However, Serbian cautious diplomacy under Ottoman oversight limited its ability to openly aid Montenegro.

Since the beginning of the 1860s dynamics changed as there were closer alignment between the two and against Ottomans. Prince Mihailo Obrenović of Serbia sought to form a Balkan alliance against the Ottomans, including Montenegro. In 1866–1868, Serbia and Montenegro signed secret agreements to coordinate anti-Ottoman activities, alongside other Balkan states like Greece and Romania. These plans aimed at a joint uprising but were disrupted by Mihailo Obrenović’s assassination in 1868. Montenegro played a leading role in supporting the Herzegovina Uprising, a revolt of Serbs against Ottoman rule in Bosnia and Herzegovina. Serbia joined the uprising in 1876, declaring war on the Ottomans alongside Montenegro. This marked the closest military cooperation between the two states in the 19th century. Serbia and Montenegro fought together against the Ottomans in Serbian–Ottoman Wars from 1876 to 1878, with Montenegro achieving significant victories (such as the Battle of Vučji Do). Their joint efforts strengthened their diplomatic position as the Great Powers intervened to resolve the conflict culminating at the Congress of Berlin in 1878, when both Serbia and Montenegro were granted formal recognition of independence.

However, Austria-Hungary’s growing influence over Serbia during the 1880s and 1890s created a divergence in foreign policy, with Montenegro aligning more closely with Russia.

=== Balkan Wars ===
The 1903 coup in Serbia, which overthrow house of Obrenović and brought King Peter I of house of Karađorđević to power, gave new dynamics to mutual relations. The new ruler adopted a more assertive nationalist policy, aligning Serbia closer to Russia and Montenegro. This shift strengthened Serbia-Montenegro relations, as both states shared anti-Austrian and anti-Ottoman goals. The Bosnian Crisis, when Austria-Hungary annexed Bosnia and Herzegovina, galvanized both Serbia and Montenegro. Montenegro supported Serbia’s protests against the annexation.

State flag of the Principality of Montenegro and the Kingdom of Montenegro, inspired by the Serbian tricolour

Both states harbored ambitions to lead South Slavic liberation movements. Serbia, with its larger population and resources, began to see itself as the nucleus of a future South Slavic state, which sometimes caused friction with Montenegro’s independent-minded ruler, King Nicholas I, who harbored ambitions to lead such a state. In March 1912, Serbia and Montenegro signed a formal alliance treaty, committing to mutual military support against the Ottoman Empire. The treaty outlined plans for coordinated action to liberate South Slavic and other Balkan territories, with provisions for dividing conquered territories.

Montenegro initiated the First Balkan War on October 8, 1912, by declaring war on the Ottoman Empire. In a prelude to the war, Serbia, Montenegro, Bulgaria, and Greece formed the Balkan League, a military alliance aimed at expelling the Ottoman Empire from the Balkans. Montenegro’s early offensive, particularly in the Sanjak of Novi Pazar and Kosovo, set the stage for broader Balkan League operations. Serbia joined the war shortly after, launching successful campaigns in Kosovo, Macedonia, and northern Albania. Serbian and Montenegrin forces coordinated closely, particularly in the capture of key Ottoman strongholds like Kumanovo and Bitola. The Treaty of London ended the war, with Serbia and Montenegro securing substantial territorial gains from the Ottoman Empire.

The Second Balkan War erupted when Bulgaria, dissatisfied with the territorial division, attacked Serbia and Greece. Montenegro sided with Serbia and fought together against, with Serbia leading major offensives. Montenegro’s contribution was smaller due to its limited resources, but it provided crucial support in maintaining pressure on Bulgarian forces in Battle of Bregalnica. The war ended with a victory for Serbia, Montenegro, Greece, and Romania against Bulgaria. Serbia gained additional territories in Macedonia, while Montenegro secured parts of the Sanjak and northern Kosovo. The creation of an independent Albania, enforced by the Great Powers (particularly Austria-Hungary), frustrated both Serbia and Montenegro, as it limited or, in case of Serbia, entirely blocked, their access to the Adriatic Sea. Montenegro was forced to withdraw from Shkodër, and Serbia lost northern Albanian territories it had occupied. This shared grievance strengthened their anti-Austrian stance.

=== World War I ===
Serbia faced direct aggression from Austria-Hungary following the assassination of Archduke Franz Ferdinand in 1914 in Sarajevo, which triggered the World War I. Montenegro immediately declared solidarity with Serbia, viewing the conflict as an extension of their shared struggle for South Slavic liberation. The Austrians then continued pushing their offensive south.

Serbia and Montenegro coordinated their military strategies early in the war. Serbia focused on defending its territory against Austro-Hungarian invasions, while Montenegro engaged Austro-Hungarian forces along its borders, particularly in the Sanjak and Bosnia-Herzegovina. Montenegro’s army, though small, played a certain role in tying down Austro-Hungarian troops. In 1914, Serbia achieved significant victories, such as the Battle of Cer and the Battle of Kolubara, repelling Austro-Hungarian offensives.

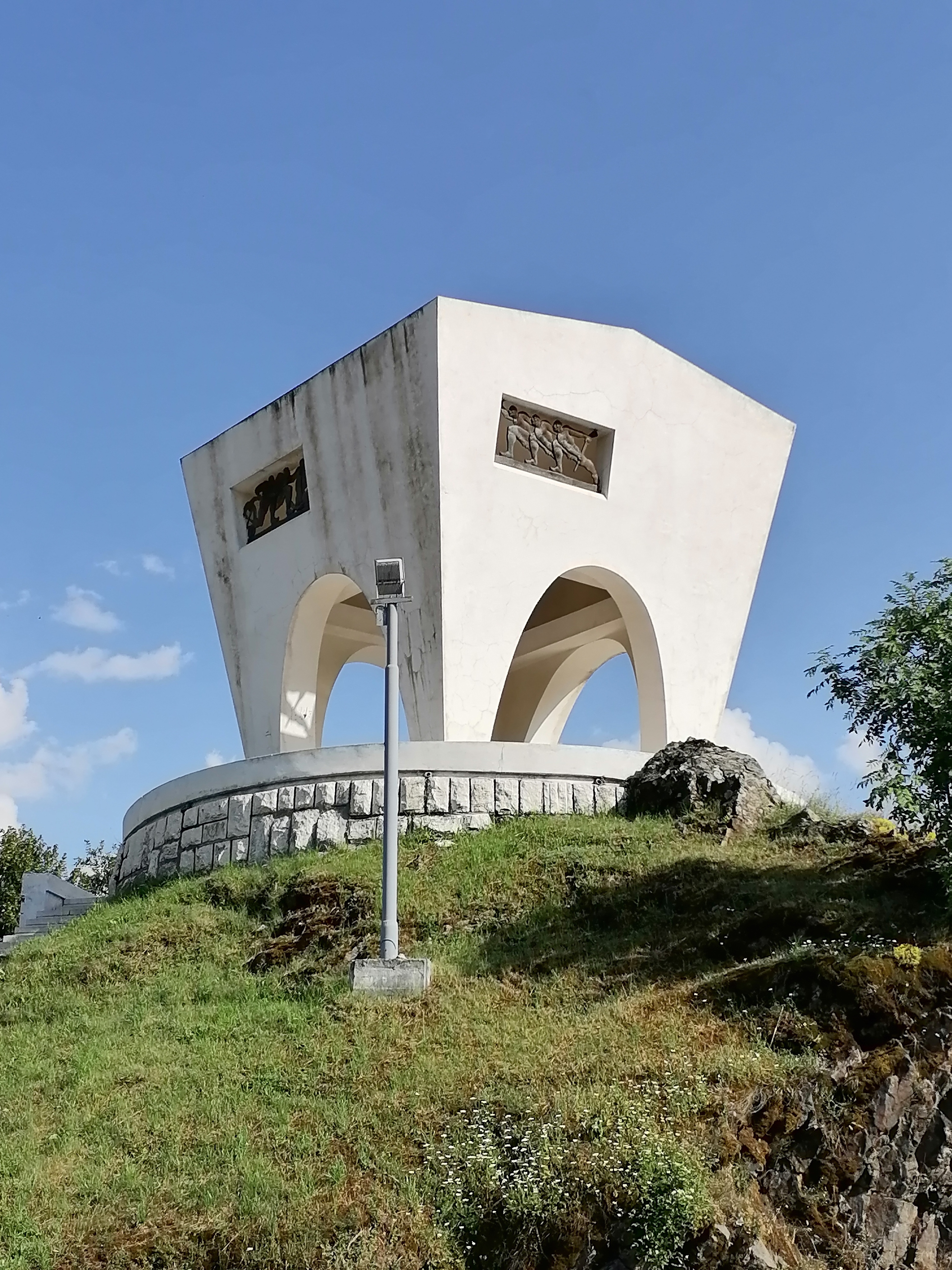
Monument to the Battle of Mojkovac, in Mojkovac

By late 1915, Serbia faced a massive offensive from three directions from Austria-Hungary, Germany, and Bulgaria, forcing the Serbian army, government, and civilians to undertake the Great Retreat through Montenegro and Albania to reach the Adriatic coast for eventual evacuation to Corfu. The Mojkovac region, located in northeastern Montenegro, was a critical chokepoint on the route used by retreating Serbian forces. Montenegro’s defense at Battle of Mojkovac in first days of 1916 aimed to delay the Austro-Hungarian advance, buying time for the Serbian forces to escape through the mountains. Despite being outnumbered and outgunned, Montenegrin forces fought fiercely in harsh winter conditions. The battle was a tactical victory for Montenegro, as it halted the Austro-Hungarian offensive long enough to allow tens of thousands of Serbian troops and civilians to continue their retreat. By holding off the Austro-Hungarian advance, Montenegrin forces ensured that the Serbian Army could reach the Adriatic coast, where Allied ships evacuated them to Corfu. This preserved the Serbian Army as a fighting force, which later contributed to victories on the Macedonian front in 1917 and 1918. The battle severely weakened Montenegro’s already strained military. Within weeks, Montenegro capitulated to Austria-Hungary, and the country was occupied. King Nicholas I and his government went into exile, joining the Serbian government-in-exile in Corfu. The Battle of Mojkovac is often described as Montenegro’s supreme act of solidarity and brotherhood with Serbia and a symbol of Montenegrin loyalty and sacrifice for the Serb cause. It is celebrated in both Serbian and Montenegrin history as a heroic stand, though some Montenegrin narratives later emphasized the disproportionate cost borne by Montenegro.

In 1917, Serbian Prime Minister Nikola Pašić and representatives of the Yugoslav Committee (a group of South Slavic exiles, including some Montenegrins) signed the Corfu Declaration, outlining plans for a post-war South Slavic state (the future Kingdom of Serbs, Croats, and Slovenes). Montenegro’s government-in-exile, led by King Nicholas I, initially supported the idea but expressed concerns about Serbia’s dominant role in the proposed union. King Nicholas I’s vision of a federal South Slavic state, with Montenegro retaining significant autonomy, clashed with Serbia’s preference for a centralized state under the house of Karađorđević. These differences foreshadowed tensions that would emerge after the war. In 1918, as the Central Powers collapsed, Serbian and Allied forces (including Montenegrin volunteers) liberated Serbia and Montenegro. The Serbian army played a leading role in expelling Austro-Hungarian forces from Montenegro, reinforcing Serbia’s position as the senior partner.

=== Unification of Serbia and Montenegro ===
The unification of Serbia and Montenegro in 1918, proclaimed by the Podgorica Assembly, and subsequent Christmas Uprising, marked the end of Montenegro’s independent state and its incorporation into the Kingdom of Serbia and, shortly thereafter, into newly formed Kingdom of Serbs, Croats, and Slovenes (later Yugoslavia).

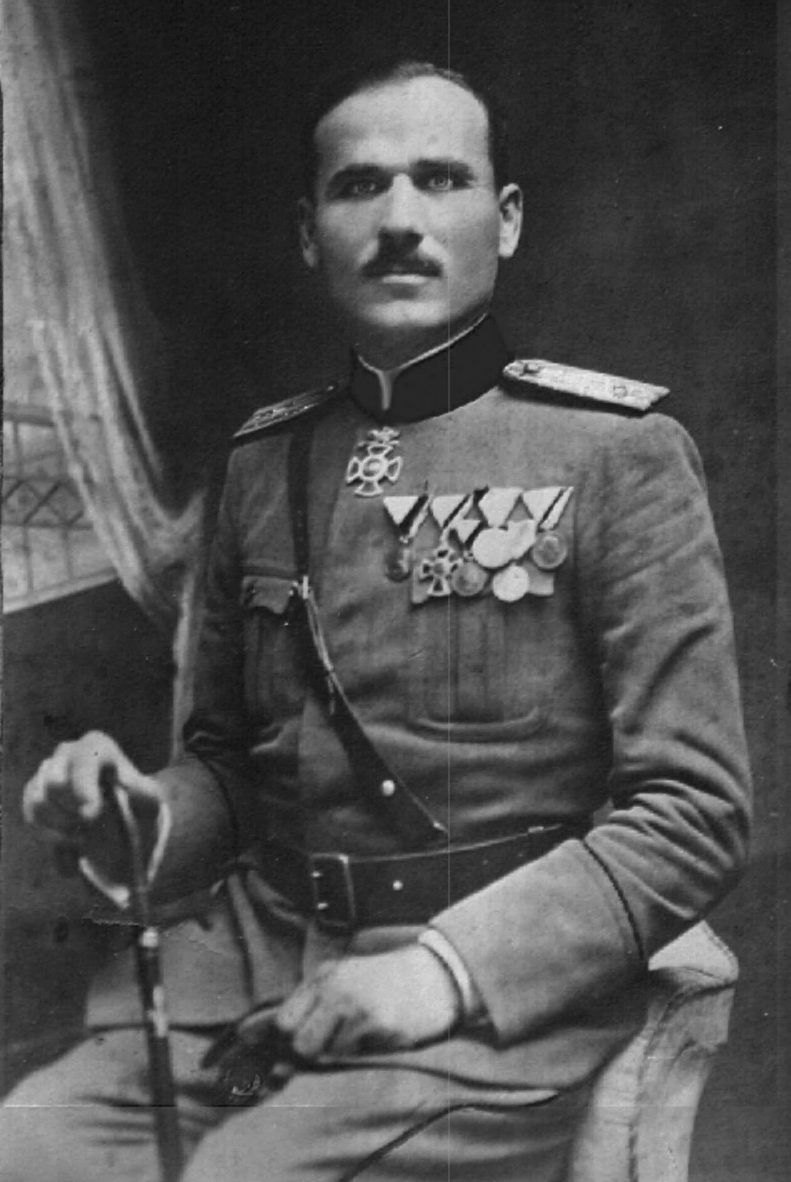
Krsto Popović, one of the leaders of the Christmas Uprising

These processes created critical schism in Montenegrin society between the Greens (Zelenaši) and Whites (Bjelaši), stemming from the candidate lists that were visually differentiated by being printed on different types of paper: white for the unionists and green for the independists. The Whites advocated for unconditional unification with Serbia and integration into the Kingdom of Serbs, Croats, and Slovenes under the House Karađorđević. The Greens, despite declaring themselves as Serbs, advocated for a partnership where Montenegro would maintain status equal to that of Serbia, constituting an integral part of the union state rather than merely a province of Serbia. These factions, rooted in political, cultural, and tribal differences, left a lasting impact on Montenegrin identity and Serbia-Montenegro relations.

On November 26, 1918, the Great People’s Assembly, later known as the Podgorica Assembly, was convened in Podgorica to decide the Montenegro’s future. The assembly consisted of 165 delegates, many of whom were elected in hastily organized elections, and dominated by the Whites. The Podgorica Assembly deposed King Nicholas I and formalized Montenegro’s incorporation into Serbia and the new Yugoslav state, declared on December 1, 1918, under King Peter I of Serbia. From exile, King Nicholas denounced the assembly as illegitimate, refusing to abdicate, but his influence was limited due to his absence and lack of military power.

A portion of Montenegro's population became dissatisfied with the political developments following the Podgorica Assembly, leading to an insurrection in January 1919. The ultimately unsuccessful rebellion, known as the Christmas Uprising, was instigated by the Greens and led by Krsto Popović and Jovan Plamenac. According to the British Military Mission to Montenegro, approximately one-fifth of the population supported the rebels. Some historians suggest that the Greens enjoyed support from a larger proportion of the population but were comparably poorly organised, indecisive, and politically divided.

=== Kingdom of Yugoslavia ===
During the 1920s and 1930s, Montenegro had no distinct political or administrative status within the Kingdom of Yugoslavia. Montenegro was included in the Zeta Banovina, which encompassed Montenegro, southern Dalmatia, eastern Herzegovina, as well as Sandžak and Metohija regions. This administrative structure diminished Montenegro’s historical identity. After the Christmas Uprising was crushed, Green leaders like Krsto Popović, continued low-level resistance from exile or within Montenegro, but their influence waned and their cause in the interwar period have been largely taken by Montenegrin Communists.

=== World War II ===
In April 1941, after the Axis invasion of Yugoslavia, Montenegro was occupied by Italy, which established a puppet structure, the Italian governorate of Montenegro, under nominal Montenegrin leadership but Italian control. Although the Italians had intended to establish a quasi-independent Montenegrin kingdom, these plans were soon permanently shelved.

Two resistance structures emerged in Montenegro, part of broader pan-Yugoslav organisation: the Partisans and the Chetniks. The Partisans led a massive popular uprising in 1941 against Italian occupation in Montenegro, one of the earliest and most successful resistance efforts in occupied Europe. Chetniks initially joined but withdrew, and later collaborated with Italians against the Partisans, alienating many Montenegrins who prioritized resistance. The Green-White divide provided a framework for aligning with either the Chetniks or Partisans, though ideological and pragmatic factors also played significant roles.

Chetniks’ royalist and Serb-centric vision naturally aligned with the Whites’ pro-Serbian stance from 1918 and many Whites or their descendants supported the Chetniks, seeing them as defenders of the pre-war Yugoslav state and the Karađorđević monarchy. Montenegrins (in both distinct ethnic or just regional Serb identification) were the second largest group within the Chetnik movement in whole of Yugoslavia.

The Partisans attracted former Greens and their descendants, as well as others who were disillusioned with the inter-war marginalization of Montenegro. The Greens’ emphasis on Montenegrin autonomy and resistance to Serbian dominance found partial alignment with the Communist vision of a post-war federal Yugoslavia, where Montenegro would be a constituent republic with equal status. Key Communist leaders like Milovan Đilas, a Montenegrin, bridged Green nationalism with communist ideals.

The Partisans ultimately liberated Montenegro from Axis forces in 1944. The Chetniks’ defeat and association with collaboration discredited the White-aligned, Serb-centric vision in Montenegro. This outcome entrenched the Partisan vision, aligning with Green aspirations for Montenegrin recognition.

=== Socialist Yugoslavia ===
In socialist Yugoslavia, the relations between Serbia and Montenegro were shaped by their status as constituent republics within a federal system under communist rule led by Josip Broz Tito. Montenegro, recognized as a separate republic equal to Serbia, enjoyed a degree of autonomy that addressed some historical grievances from the inter-war period. The socialist framework emphasized Yugoslav unity but at same time recognized Montenegrins as a distinct ethnicity, separate from Serbs, with their own cultural institutions. It did not, however, resolve underlying issues tied to Montenegrin identity.

Montenegro, one of Yugoslavia’s least developed regions, received significant federal investment, often channeled through Belgrade, where Serbia’s leadership had influence. Infrastructure projects, such as Port of Bar and Belgrade-Bar railway, strengthened economic ties between Serbia and Montenegro.

=== Breakup of Yugoslavia and Yugoslav Wars ===
The relations between Serbia and Montenegro during the breakup of Yugoslavia were characterized by close alignment, as Montenegro, under leaders aligned with Serbia’s Slobodan Milošević, was Serbia’s closest ally during this turbulent period, as Montenegrin leadership, installed during the Anti-bureaucratic revolution, was staunchly pro-Serbian. Montenegro voted with Serbia in federal bodies to block independence efforts by Slovenia, Croatia, and Bosnia and Herzegovina.

Montenegro actively supported Serbia during the War in Croatia in 1991. Montenegrin citizens, recruited into the Yugoslav People’s Army, participated in operations, notably the Siege of Dubrovnik, which damaged Montenegro’s international reputation. A decade later, some of Montenegrin leaders expressed regret and offered an apology, distancing themselves from Serbia’s war policies. In Bosnian War, Montenegro provided logistical support to Bosnian Serb forces, though without direct military involvement.

=== Federal Republic of Yugoslavia/State Union of Serbia and Montenegro ===
In 1992, Serbia and Montenegro formed the Federal Republic of Yugoslavia, a federation consisting of two constituent republics: Serbia and Montenegro. A federal structure with a bicameral parliament, a president, and a prime minister was established. Belgrade remained the capital, and Serbia’s far larger population size and economic weight ensured its dominance in federal institutions. A new state claimed to be the legal successor to the Socialist Federal Republic of Yugoslavia, though this was contested internationally.

Proclamation of a new state was preceded by the referendum in Montenegro, held to determine whether Montenegro would remain in a federation with Serbia or seek independence, as other Yugoslav republics had done. The electorate overwhelmingly supported continued union with Serbia, reflecting the dominance of pro-Serbian sentiment in Montenegro at the time.

However, underlying tensions over Montenegro’s autonomy and identity began to emerge, particularly in the late 1990s, as Montenegro’s leadership, notably Milo Đukanović, started to diverge from Serbia’s policies. After overthrow of Slobodan Milošević and amid growing Montenegrin push for independence, the Federal Republic of Yugoslavia was transformed in 2003 into the State Union of Serbia and Montenegro, a very loose federal structure. The arrangement proved dysfunctional and unstable, since the constitutional charter of newly-formed union included a clause allowing either republic to hold a referendum on independence after just three years.

Percentage of "Yes" votes in the 2006 Montenegrin independence referendum

=== Montenegrin independence referendum ===
Montenegro’s independence in 2006, achieved through the referendum, marked the restoration of Montenegrin sovereignty after nearly a century of union with Serbia. The referendum’s narrow result (55.5% for independence; 44.5% against) reflected Montenegro’s old divisions, the Greens-Whites and Partisans-Chetniks divide. The dissolution of the State Union ended Serbia-Montenegro formal political ties, straining relations temporarily.

=== Accession of Montenegro and Serbia to the European Union ===
Montenegro applied for European Union membership in 2008, was granted candidate status in 2011 and started accession negotiations in 2012. As of November 2026, it has opened all 33 chapters and has provisionally closed 23. Montenegro is currently working to close the remaining chapters by the end of 2026, with Prime Minister Milojko Spajić suggesting that accession could be achieved by 2028.

Serbia applied for European Union membership in 2009, was granted candidate status in 2012 and started accession negotiations in 2014. As of November 2026, It has opened 22 out of 35 chapters and has provisionally closed two. While the 2026 European Union Enlargement Package states Serbia has so far failed to make "substantive progress" in accession negotiations, it notes that the newly elected government has a "strong mandate for reform" and that it should prioritise reversing "negative trends related to the fundamentals of the accession process" if it wishes to progress in negotiations.

== Political relations ==
Both countries maintain pragmatic political relations, although their foreign policy orientation has become increasingly divergent. Montenegro has been pursuing a pro-Western orientation, joining NATO in 2017 and advancing toward European Union membership, while Serbia maintains a more neutral stance, balancing ties with the European Union, United States, Russia, and China.

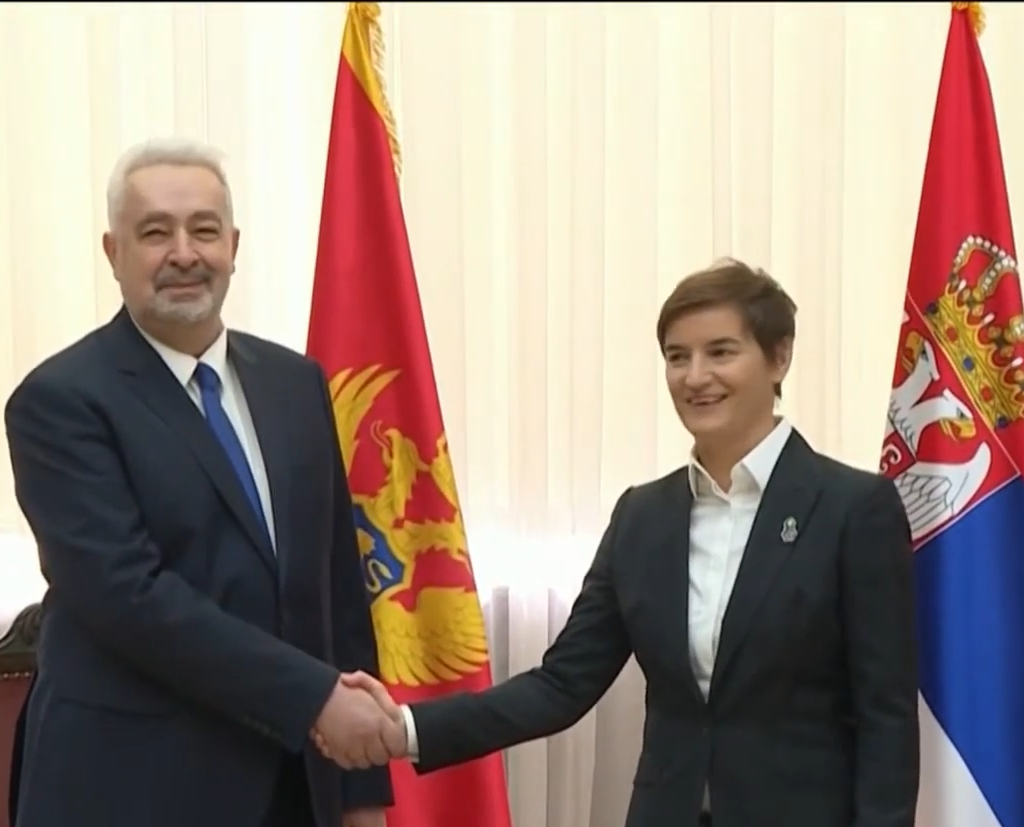
Prime Minister of Montenegro, Zdravko Krivokapić, and Prime Minister of Serbia, Ana Brnabić, in Belgrade, 2021

Montenegro, as a newly independent state, faced in 2008 a delicate decision regarding recognition of Kosovo’s independence, balancing its pro-Western orientation with its historical ties to Serbia. Montenegro eventually recognized Kosovo’s independence, following intense domestic debate. The decision was driven by Montenegrin aspirations for EU and NATO membership. Serbia condemned Montenegro’s decision, viewing it as a betrayal given their historical alliance and expelled Montenegro’s ambassador. Diplomatic relations were restored in 2009 after tensions cooled, with Serbia appointing a new ambassador to Montenegro. The Kosovo issue remained a sore point in bilateral relations, as Serbia continues to challenge Kosovo’s independence diplomatically while Montenegro maintains its recognition.

In 2019, Parliament of Montenegro passed a Freedom of Religion Act, requiring religious organizations to prove ownership of properties held before 1918 or transfer them to state control. The Serbian Orthodox Church viewed this as targeting its assets, churches and monasteries. The law sparked massive demonstrations, led by the Serbian Orthodox Church and pro-Serbian political parties, with tens of thousands rallying across Montenegro. These protests were strongly backed by Serbia’s government and media who framed the law as "anti-Serb", while Montenegro accused Serbia of meddling in its internal affairs. After 2020, the new Montenegrin government, led by pro-Serbian parties, amended the religious law to ease concerns of the Serbian Orthodox Church.

However, debates over Montenegrin identity continue to influence relations and occasionally spark tensions. In 2012, Tomislav Nikolić, President of Serbia, in an interview to Montenegrin daily newspaper said: I acknowledge Montenegro as an independent and historical nation, but I do not acknowledge any difference between Serbs and Montenegrins, because there is none. In 2020, the Serbian ambassador to Montenegro was declared a persona non grata due to his controversial statement regarding the Podgorica Assembly.

== Economic relations ==
Serbia is the biggest trading partner of Montenegro. Trade between two countries reached almost $1.5 billion in 2023; Serbia's merchandise export to Montenegro were over $1.3 billion; Montenegrin exports were standing at roughly $160 million.

Serbia is the largest tourist market for Montenegro since tourists from Serbia accounted for almost one-fifth of all foreign arrivals in 2024. Montenegro is, alongside Greece, favorite holiday destination for Serbians due to its proximity and cultural ties. There are some fifteen thousand secondary or vacation homes on the Montenegrin coast owned by Serbian nationals.

Serbian public telecommunications company Telekom Srbija is the owner of Mtel, the biggest telecom operator in Montenegro. Serbian AikBank is the owner of Hipotekarna banka, the second-largest bank in Montenegro.

== Serbs in Montenegro ==
Serbs are the second largest ethnic group in Montenegro (after Montenegrins), numbering 205,370 (33% of the total population) according to the 2023 Census. They are absolute majority in Pljevlja, Berane, Andrijevica, and Žabljak; relative majority in Herceg Novi, Budva, Tivat, and Bijelo Polje. In three largest towns, they form significant part of population: in Podgorica, Serbs consist 30% of city's population, while in Nikšić and Bar, 34% and 26%, respectively.

== Montenegrins in Serbia ==
Montenegrins in Serbia are a recognized ethnic minority group, numbering 20,238 (0.3% of the total population) according to data from the 2022 census. The largest concentrations are to be found in largest cities of Belgrade (4,753) and Novi Sad (2,225), as well as in municipalities in central Bačka: Vrbas (4,264 or 11% of municipal population), Kula (1,992 or 5%), and Mali Iđoš (1,226 or 12%), where there was a wave of colonization of Montenegrin settlers right after the World War II.

== Resident diplomatic missions ==
- Montenegro has an embassy in Belgrade and consulate-general in Sremski Karlovci.
- Serbia has an embassy in Podgorica and consulate-general in Herceg Novi.

== See also ==
- Foreign relations of Montenegro
- Foreign relations of Serbia
- Serbia and Montenegro
- Serbian–Montenegrin unionism

== Sources ==
- Banac, Ivo (1984). The National Question in Yugoslavia: Origins, History, Politics. Ithaca: Cornell University Press. ISBN 0-8014-1675-2.
- Banac, Ivo (1992). "'Emperor Karl Has Become a Comitadji': The Croatian Disturbances of Autumn 1918". The Slavonic and East European Review. 70 (2). London: Modern Humanities Research Association: 284–305. ISSN 0037-6795. JSTOR 4210927.
- Ćirković, Sima (2004). The Serbs. Malden: Blackwell Publishing. ISBN 9781405142915.
- Lemkin, Raphael (2008). Axis Rule in Occupied Europe. Clark, New Jersey: The Lawbook Exchange. ISBN 978-1-58477-901-8. Archived from the original on 2023-01-14.
- Morrison, Kenneth (2008). Montenegro, A Modern History. London: I.B. Tauris. ISBN 978-0-85771-487-9.
- Morrison, Kenneth (2009). Montenegro: A Modern History. I.B. Tauris. ISBN 978-1845117108.
- Pavlović, Srdja (2008). Balkan Anschluss: The Annexation of Montenegro and the Creation of the Common South Slavic State. West Lafayette: Purdue University Press. ISBN 978-1-55753-465-1.
- Pavlowitch, Kosta St. (2003). "The First World War and Unification of Yugoslavia". In Djokic, Dejan (ed.). Yugoslavism: Histories of a Failed Idea, 1918–1992. London: C. Hurst & Co. pp. 27–41. ISBN 1-85065-663-0.
- Pavlowitch, Stevan K. (2007). Hitler's New Disorder: The Second World War in Yugoslavia. New York: Columbia University Press. ISBN 978-1-85065-895-5.
- Ramet, Sabrina P. (2006). The Three Yugoslavias: State-building and Legitimation, 1918–2005. Bloomington: Indiana University Press. ISBN 9780253346568.
- Rodogno, Davide (2006). Fascism's European Empire: Italian Occupation During the Second World War. Cambridge: Cambridge University Press. ISBN 978-0-521-84515-1. Archived from the original on 2023-02-15.
- Sotirović, Vladislav B. (2011). "The Serbian Patriarchate of Peć in the Ottoman Empire: The First Phase (1557–94)" (PDF). Serbian Studies. 25 (2): 143–169. Archived from the original (PDF) on 2016-08-10.
- Tomasevich, Jozo (1975). War and Revolution in Yugoslavia, 1941–1945: The Chetniks. Stanford: Stanford University Press. ISBN 978-0-8047-0857-9.
