= Uprising in Montenegro =

Uprising in Montenegro may refer to:

- Christmas Uprising (1919), against the union with Serbia
- 13 July Uprising (1941), against Axis occupation during World War II
