= Antonio Baldacci (botanist) =

Italian scholar, botanist, and geographer (1867–1950)

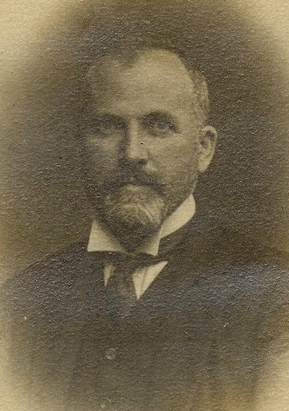
- Portrait of Baldacci from the Biblioteca comunale dell'Archiginnasio
- Born: 1867; Bologna, Italy
- Died: 1950 (aged 82–83); Bologna, Italy
- Citizenship: Italy
- Scientific career
- Fields: Botany
- Author abbrev. (botany): Bald.

Antonio Baldacci (1867–1950) was an Italian scholar, botanist, and geographer.

== Life ==
Baldacci carried out field research in the southern Balkans from the end of the 19th century onward.

After achieving a degree in Zoology in 1891, and following two lecturing posts in Botany and Geography at the University of Bologna in 1889 and 1901 respectively, Baldacci became an assistant at the Botanical Institute where he remained until 1902, after which he transferred to Rome to teach Political and Colonial Geography at the Diplomatic-Colonial School connected to the University.

During his time in Rome many attended his lectures, including ministers and prominent Roman politicians, as well as artists and intellectuals such as Gabriele D’Annunzio, the painters Giulio Aristide Sartorio and Francesco Paolo Michetti, and the painter and sculptor Costantino Barbella.

He published many articles on Albanian and Balkan flora, as well as several monographs on Albania.

Baldacci distributed the exsiccata-like series Flora exsiccata Crnagorae and several other specimen series from Albania and Montenegro.

Baldacci organized a committee which supported the Montenegrin Greens during and after the Christmas Uprising, until at least 1921.
