= Savo Lazarević =

Montenegrin military officer

- Саво Лазаревић
- Born: 1849; Lipovo
- Died: July 1943 (aged 93–94)
- Military career
- Allegiance: Principality of Montenegro; Kingdom of Montenegro; Kingdom of Yugoslavia
- Branch: Gendarmerie
- Rank: Colonel
- Nickname: Batara
- Unit: Montenegrin Gendarmerie in Metohija
- Commands: ?—1912 - commander of Montenegrin detachment in Kolašin 1912—1916 - commander of Montenegrin gendarmerie in Metohija
- Conflicts: First Balkan War; First World War; Battle of Mojkovac

Savo Lazarević nicknamed Batara (1849 — 1943) was a Montenegrin military officer.

== Family ==
Lazarević was born in Lipovo. His father's name was Džajo. According to Ratko Parežanin, Lazarević had a son, Ljubo.

== First Balkan War and First World War ==
From 1912 to 1916, Lazarević was the commander of the Montenegrin gendarmerie in Metohija, whose members were known as the winged men (Serbian: Крилаши) because of the insignia they wore on their hats, which depicted an eagle with open wings. Those who were shot at by Lazarević nicknamed him Batara, which means 'salvo' in Albanian (Albanian: Batare). According to some sources he subjected many Albanians from Metohija to forcible Christianization.

Lazarević was one of the most prominent Serb figures in Albanian epic poetry, alongside Marko Miljanov and Radomir Vešović.

Lazarević was the commander of the Montenegrin Royal Gendarmerie which was part of the Čakor Detachment during the Battle of Mojkovac. According to some Albanian newspapers, the Gendarmerie under Lazarević's command killed Isa Boletini in January 1916.

== World War II ==
According to pro-Chetnik sources, Lazarević supported Chetniks during the World War II. During short-lived communist rule in Montenegro in 1941, Lazarević resisted to communists in his kulla in Lipovo with several of his relatives. The Chetnik leader Draža Mihailović stayed in Lipovo from mid-1942 to the beginning of 1943.

The house of Lazarević was perfect choice of Chetnik headquarter (Serbian: Горски Штаб) because it was situated on a hill which dominated whole of its surrounding. According to report of the Commander of Communist Durmitor Detachment, Partisans attacked Gornje Lipovo and performed cleansing operation which included the house of Savo Lazarević. The communists had an order to establish their own headquarter in the house of Savo Lazarević.

The communist forces tried to kill him because they concluded he was "irreversible reactionary and enemy of People's Liberation War". Their first attempt in March 1942 was not successful. They succeeded in June 1943.

Savo Lazarević was 93 when, together with his brother Vučeta and Gligorije Puletić from Gornje Lipovo, defended his house from the attacking communist forces. They resisted three days to attacking communist forces and killed 5 Partisans. When they spent all their ammunition, they committed suicide with hand grenades.

== Sources ==
- Milatović, Arso (1990). Kosmet: 1935-1945 : moje svedočenje. Naučna knjiga. ISBN 9788623700859.
- Batalović, Vasilije (1988). Vekovi života: hronika. Nova knjiga. ISBN 9788673350639.
- Vukčević, Slavko; Kovačević, Branislav (1 January 1997). Mojkovačka operacija, 1915-1916: zbornik radova sa naučnog skupa. Institut za savremenu istoriju. ISBN 9788674030707.
- Parežanin, Ratko (1974). Moja misija u Crnoj Gori. Iskra.
- Plećaš, Neđeljko B. (1983). Ratne godine, 1941–1945 [War Years, 1941–1945] (in Serbo-Croatian). Columbus, Ohio: Kosovo Publishing Company. OCLC 10425957.
- Redžić, Vučeta (2002). Građanski rat u Crnoj Gori: Dešavanja od sredine 1942. godine do sredine 1945. godine. Stupovi.
- Tomić, Nikola N. (1978). Crna Gora pod okupacijom.
- Redžić, Vučeta (1999). "Pasje groblje" u Kolašinu. EVRO.
