= Krsto Popović =

Montenegrin military officer

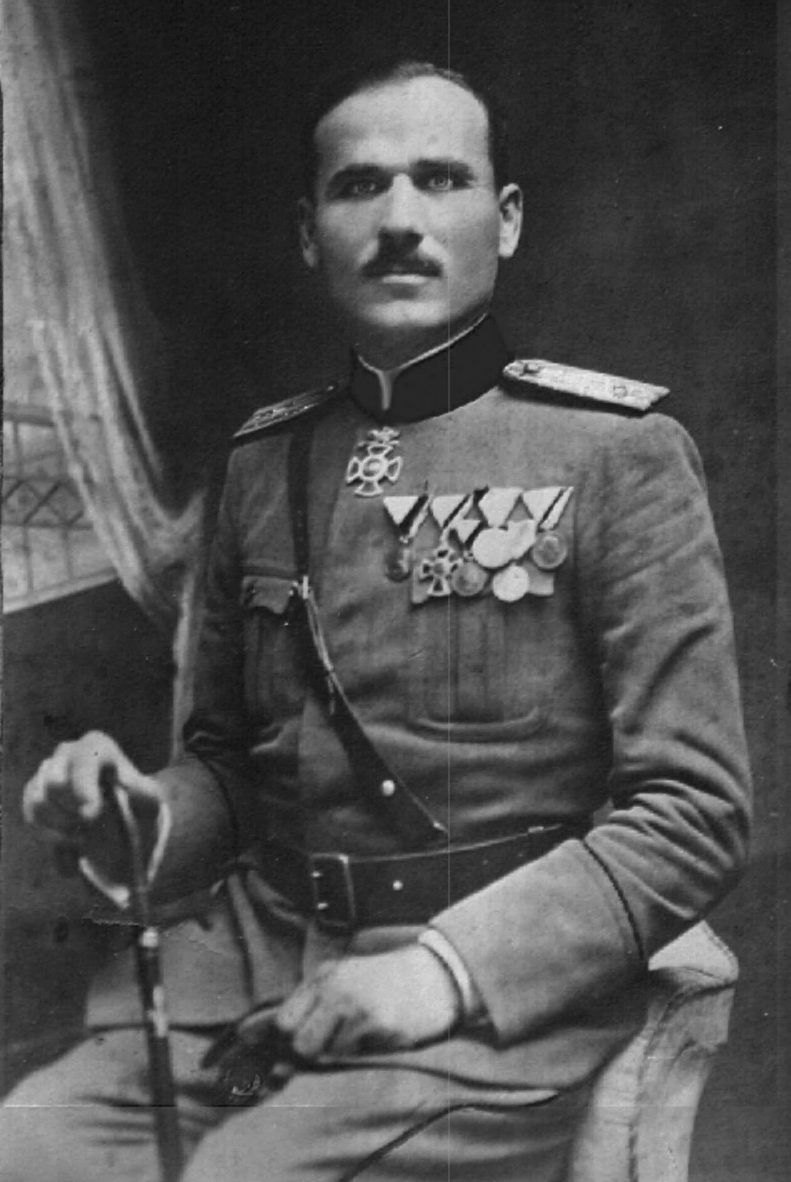
- Born: 13 September 1881; Lipa, Cetinje, Montenegro
- Died: 14 March 1947 (aged 65); Grahovo, PR Montenegro, Yugoslavia
- Military career
- Allegiance: Principality of Montenegro; Kingdom of Montenegro; Italian governorate of Montenegro
- Branch: Army
- Service years: 1912–1947
- Rank: Brigadier General
- Nickname: Krsto Zrnov
- Units: Greens; Lovćen Brigade
- Conflicts: First Balkan War; Siege of Scutari; Second Balkan War; Battle of Bregalnica; World War I; Battle of Mojkovac (POW); Christmas Uprising; World War II
- Awards: Obilić Medal

Secretary of the National Assembly of Principality of Montenegro
- In office 8 November 1906 – 29 September 1907 Serving with Milutin Tatar
- Monarch: Nicholas I
- President of the Popular Assembly: Labud Gojnić
- Vice president of the Popular Assembly: Miroslav Nikolić
- Preceded by: Position created
- Succeeded by: Himself; Filip M. Protić
- In office 29 September 1907 – 14 October 1908 Serving with Filip M. Protić
- Monarch: Nicholas I
- President of the Popular Assembly: Labud Gojnić
- Vice president of the Popular Assembly: Miroslav Nikolić
- Preceded by: Himself; Milutin Tatar
- Succeeded by: Sava Dragović; Dušan Petrović

Secretary of the National Assembly of Kingdom of Montenegro
- In office 12 December 1915 – 4 January 1916 Serving with J. Popović
- Monarch: Nicholas I
- President of the Popular Assembly: Milo Dožić
- Vice president of the Popular Assembly: Petar Plamenac
- Preceded by: Kosta Popović; Mita Pavićević
- Succeeded by: Position abolished

Leader of the Greens of Kingdom of Montenegro
- In office 1 January 1919 – May 1945 Serving with Jovan Plamenac and Novica Cerović
- In office May 1945 – 14 March 1947

Commander-in-chief of the Army of the Greens of Kingdom of Montenegro
- In office 1 January – 7 January 1919

Leader of the Montenegrin Federalist Party
- In office 1923–1945 Serving with Sekula Drljević and Mihailo Ivanović
- President: Sekula Drljević

Chief of the General Staff of the Kingdom of Montenegro-in Exile Army
- In office 1921–1922
- Preceded by: Đuro Jovović
- Succeeded by: Position abolished

Krsto Popović (Serbian Cyrillic: Крсто Поповић; 13 September 1881 – 14 March 1947) was an officer of the Montenegrin Army who fought in the Balkan Wars and in the First World War.

Dissatisfied with the Podgorica Assembly of 1918 which merged Serbia and Montenegro into what would become Yugoslavia, he became one of the leaders of the 1919 Christmas Uprising on the side of the Greens who supported the newly dethroned King Nikola of the Petrović-Njegoš dynasty and who favored a confederation of Yugoslavia that still gave Montenegro a form of independence in skirmishes against the Whites who favored King Alexander of the Karađorđević dynasty and complete annexation of Montenegro into Yugoslavia.

After the uprising failed, Popović emigrated to Italy, but returned in June 1919 to start guerrilla warfare. He eventually laid down arms after the death of King Nikola in 1921 and he was eventually pardoned by King Alexander after proclaiming allegiance to him. He lived out his remaining years in Yugoslavia relatively peacefully until the Second World War when he formed the Lovćen Brigade. For this, he was labelled a collaborator by the new Communist government and in 1947 he was killed in an ambush by agents of the OZNA.

== Life ==
Born in a Montenegrin Serb family to father Todor "Zrno" Popović and mother Ćetna (née Krivokapić), he fought in the Balkan Wars and World War I in the Montenegrin army forces until being captured by Austro-Hungarian army in 1916. He was also one of the prominent heroes of the Battle of Mojkovac, where Montenegro helped the army of Serbia, its close ally, to retreat in face of Austro-Hungarian attacks. After spending two years in the Austro-Hungarian prisoner camp, he returned to Montenegro to become the leader of the Christmas Uprising on 7 January 1919 and Saint Petar's Day Uprising in July of same year, fighting against the decision of the Podgorica Assembly to unite the Kingdom of Montenegro with the Kingdom of Serbia under the House of Karađorđević. Between 1919 and 1922, he was a leader of Montenegrin komite, fighters for the federalisation of the Kingdom of Serbs, Croats and Slovenes. In 1922, he emigrated to Argentina and later to Belgium in 1929.

The Greens voted against the unification of the Kingdom of Montenegro with the Kingdom of Serbia Podgorica Assembly, while the majority Whites (Bjelaši) supported it. Meanwhile, only several months after his arrival in Montenegro, Krsto Popović returned to Italy, where he served in the army of the Montenegrin government in exile, advancing to level of commander, and later to brigadier.

In 1929, from Belgium he sent a letter to King Alexander, in which he asked the King to pardon him from responsibility for the civil war in Montenegro from December 1918 until King Nikola's death. In this letter, he also proclaimed his loyalty to King Aleksandar Karađorđević. On 18 October 1929, in the province of Liege, Belgium, immigration police issued him a passport under number 9121, with visa number 94 in which he identified his nationality as Serb.

King Alexander subsequently pardoned him and he returned to the Kingdom of Yugoslavia, receiving a pension and living in retirement until World War II broke out and Popović organized his collaboration militia, called the Lovćen Brigade. This militia was under the control or influence of the fascist Italian occupation force, and it waged war against the Partisans and the Yugoslav Army in the Fatherland (Chetniks). Popović's vision was Montenegrin independence through cooperation with Fascist Italy, which led to his conflicts with both Montenegrin Partisans and Chetniks. During the war his militia split; one group joined the Partisans, and others joined the Chetniks. Popović did not join either side.

He was ambushed and killed in a shootout by OZNA agents Rako Mugoša, Veljko Milatović and Šaro Brajović in 1947. Mugoša was also killed in the shootout while Milatović and Brajović survived.

== Personal life ==
In 1905, he married Marija (née Radojević) with whom he had five daughters and two sons Radovan and Nikola.

His son Radovan died as a member of the Yugoslav Partisans in the Battle of Neretva while his son Nikola would later become a general in the Yugoslav People's Army and a recipient of the Order of the People's Hero.

== Literature ==
- Bogdanović, Boris (2007). Bijela knjiga: referendum u Crnoj Gori 2006 : zbornik dokumenata. IIC Narodna misao. ISBN 978-9940-518-00-4.
