= Podgorica Assembly =

1918 popular assembly in Montenegro

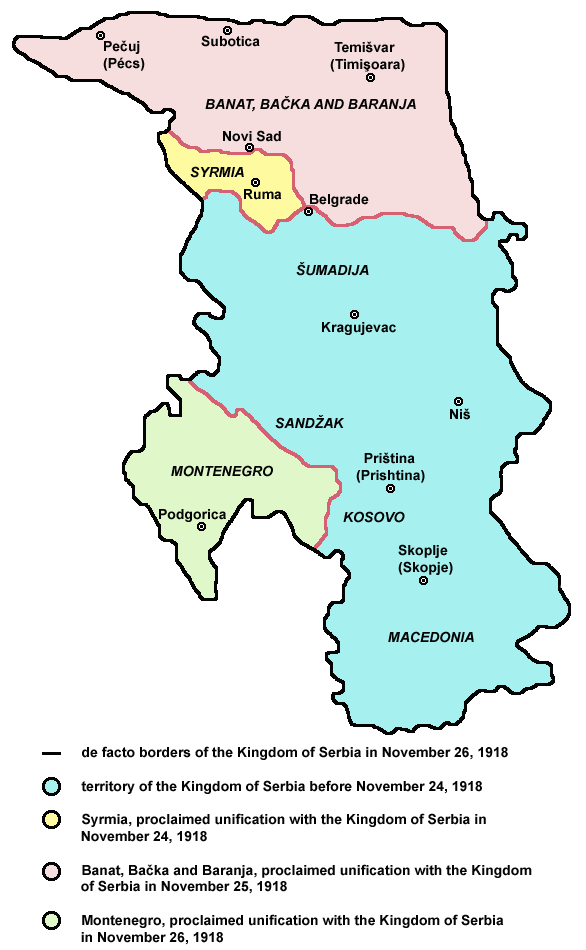
Map showing Montenegro (green) and Serbia (blue) at the conclusion of World War I.

The Great People's Assembly of the Serb People in Montenegro (Serbian: Велика народна скупштина српског народа у Црној Гори, romanized: Velika narodna skupština srpskog naroda u Crnoj Gori), commonly known as the Podgorica Assembly (Подгоричка скупштина, Podgorička skupština), was an ad hoc popular assembly convened in November 1918, after the end of World War I in the Kingdom of Montenegro. The committee convened the assembly with the aim of facilitating an unconditional union of Montenegro and Serbia and removing Nikola I of Montenegro from the throne. The assembly was organised by a committee supported by and coordinating with the government of the Kingdom of Serbia. The unification was successful and preceded the establishment of the Kingdom of Serbs, Croats and Slovenes as a unified state of South Slavs by mere days. The unification was justified by the need to establish a single Serbian state for all Serbs, including Montenegro whose population as well as Nikola I felt that Montenegro belonged to the Serbian nation and largely supported the unification.

Nikola I criticised the Podgorica Assembly's elections and resolutions, arguing both were illegitimate and unlawful while his government was in exile in France. Opponents of the unconditional union, known as the Greens for the colour of paper used for pro-independence candidates, supported either full independence of Montenegro or a federation or a confederation with Serbia and other South Slavs where Montenegro would be an equal partner.

Following the resolutions on the unification and the deposition of the Nikola I, the Greens resorted to insurrection to fight pro-unionist Whites, likewise named after the color of the paper used to print Podgorica Assembly pro-unionist candidate lists. The ultimately unsuccessful insurrection became known as the Christmas Uprising. Some of the Greens continued their political struggle for a federal common South Slavic state through the establishment of the Montenegrin Federalist Party in 1923. The issue of the legality and legitimacy of the Podgorica Assembly has been debated since its convening. The resolution of the Podgorica Assembly was annulled by the Parliament of Montenegro following the breakup of Yugoslavia and the 2006 Montenegrin independence referendum. In its resolution, the parliament declared the Podgorica Assembly unlawful and illegitimate, describing the unification resulting from the Podgorica Assembly as a coup d'état.

== Background ==
=== Montenegrin independence and alliances ===
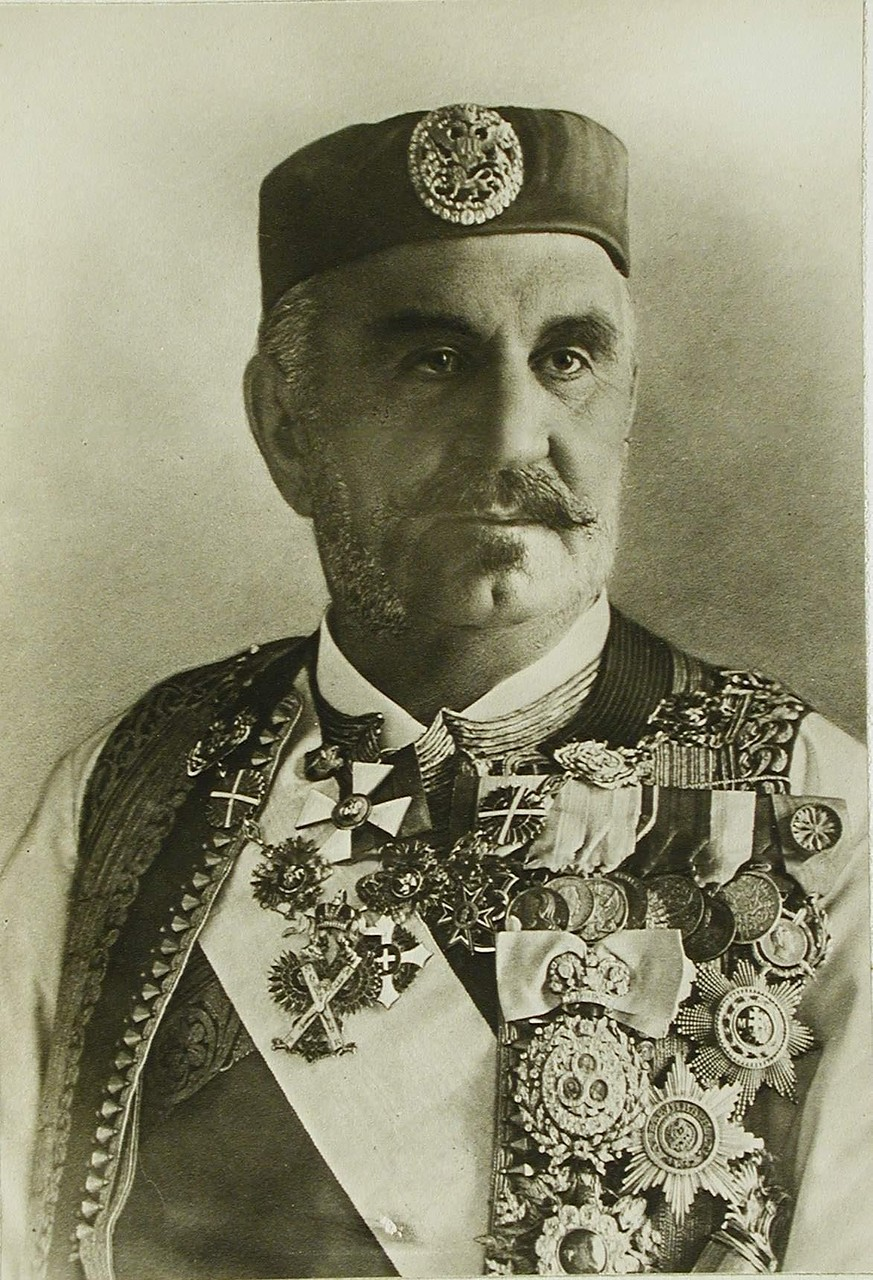
Nikola I ruled Montenegro as prince or king from 1860.

The Kingdom of Montenegro was an independent country in the Balkans until World War I, ruled by King Nikola, who wielded practically absolutist powers, Nikola considered Montenegro the remnant of the medieval Serbian Empire left unconquered following the expansion of the Ottoman Empire in Europe. He viewed the Montenegrins as free Serbian people who would eventually defeat the Ottomans in the context of resolving the Eastern question and revive the Serbian medieval empire in the Balkans, with him as the supreme leader of the South Slavs inhabiting the area. Nikola firmly believed that Montenegro and the Kingdom of Serbia should unite, a view shared by a slim majority of Montenegro's population. The prevailing sentiment in Montenegro was that Montenegro should lead the unification. Contemporary Serb writers Simo Matavulj and Marko Car likened Montenegro's role in the South Slavic unification to the leading role of Piedmont in the unification of Italy. Nikola's support for unification was tempered by his desire to ensure the continued rule of his Petrović-Njegoš dynasty and to expand Montenegro before any unification, the latter intended to ensure a better negotiating position for Montenegro as an equal partner to the territorially larger Serbia.

Following the assassination of Archduke Franz Ferdinand, the subsequent July Crisis, and the Austro-Hungarian declaration of war against Serbia, Montenegro witnessed widespread popular support for Serbia. In response, Montenegro entered into a military treaty with Serbia on 4 August 1914, just two days before declaring war on Austria-Hungary. According to the treaty, the Montenegrin Army fell under the command of the Royal Serbian Army's High Command, with Nikola I retaining a nominal position as supreme commander. The treaty mandated that two-thirds of Montenegro's forces be stationed in Pljevlja in the north to support a Serbian offensive aimed at capturing Sarajevo, while the remainder defended the borders of Montenegro. Additionally, Serbia was to receive and distribute aid from the allied Entente powers. Serbia outlined its war aims in the Niš Declaration, emphasizing the post-war unification of the Serbs, Croats, and Slovenes, which marginalised Montenegro in the proposed state-building process. In 1915, Montenegro sought support from the Russian Empire for its aspirations to expand along the Adriatic Sea and its hinterland between the Mat and Neretva rivers – encompassing Herzegovina, southern Dalmatia, and the city of Shkodër – but these efforts were unsuccessful. The Entente pressured Montenegro to align its war aims with those of Serbia and abandon any separate ambitions.

=== Military defeat ===
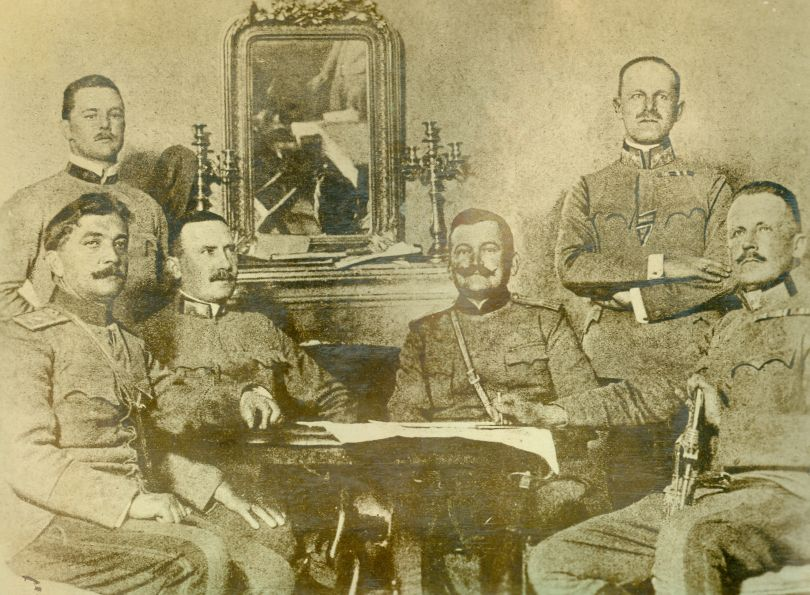
Formal surrender of Montenegro to Austro-Hungarian forces in 1916

From the outset of the war, Montenegro faced shortages of equipment and food. The first clash of interests between Montenegro and Serbia occurred in June 1915 when Nikola ordered the army to capture Shkodër. Although the Serbian government disapproved of this move, it refrained from confronting Nikola to avoid potentially increasing support for him among the Montenegrin population. After Serbia's military defeat in the 1915 Serbian campaign, the Royal Serbian Army suffered significant losses, reducing its size to a level comparable to that of the Montenegrin forces. To prevent the Montenegrin allies from becoming the senior Entente-allied fighting force in the area, Serbia sought to weaken the Montenegrin army similarly. Consequently, the bulk of the Montenegrin forces were ordered by the Royal Serbian Army's High Command to move to the north of Montenegro, concentrating around the Sandžak region. This left the southern border, including Lovćen Mountain between the Austro-Hungarian Bay of Kotor and the Montenegrin capital, thinly defended.

In November–December 1915, while the Montenegrin forces were shielding the Royal Serbian Army during its Great Retreat from Serbia through Montenegro and Albania to Greece, Austro-Hungarian forces advanced across Lovćen in the Montenegrin campaign. Towards the end of December, anticipating the imminent loss of the city, the king, government officials, members of parliament, representatives of the Serbian High Command, and foreign embassies were evacuated from the nation's capital of Cetinje to Podgorica. On 19 January, Nikola and most of the government left Monetenegro. Acting against Nikola's instructions, the remaining government ministers declared themselves the new government and surrendered to Austria-Hungary. They later attributed the surrender to Nikola's departure. Accusations regarding the surrender were exchanged between members of the government-in-exile and the king. Prime Minister Lazar Mijušković resigned from his post after one such dispute, expressing support for union with Serbia over the preservation of Montenegrin independence. Andrija Radović was appointed by Nikola I to succeed Mijušković.

Throughout the war, most Entente powers did not completely trust Montenegro as an ally due to persistent rumours of covert diplomatic arrangements. These rumours were encouraged by Serbia, which even used a forged agreement between Montenegro and Austria-Hungary. Instead of confronting Nikola for fear of pushing Montenegro to the opposing camp, the Entente powers chose to work to channel their support through Serbia. The Kingdom of Italy, despite being part of the Entente, supported Montenegrin independence, viewing the prospective unified South Slavic state as a threat to its interests in the Balkans and the Adriatic. Italy exploited the so-called Montenegrin question to extract concessions from Serbia. The United States did not proactively engage in the issue of Montenegrin independence before the Paris Peace Conference of 1919, failing to obtain international support for the restoration of Montenegro's independence. By 1918, Nikola shifted his approach to Yugoslavism, advocating first for a Yugoslav federation and then a confederation as the common South Slavic state, with Montenegro as one of its constitutive elements. In an interview in the final days of the war, Nikola expressed hope that U.S. President Woodrow Wilson would ensure Montenegro's independent political future.

=== Montenegrin Committee ===
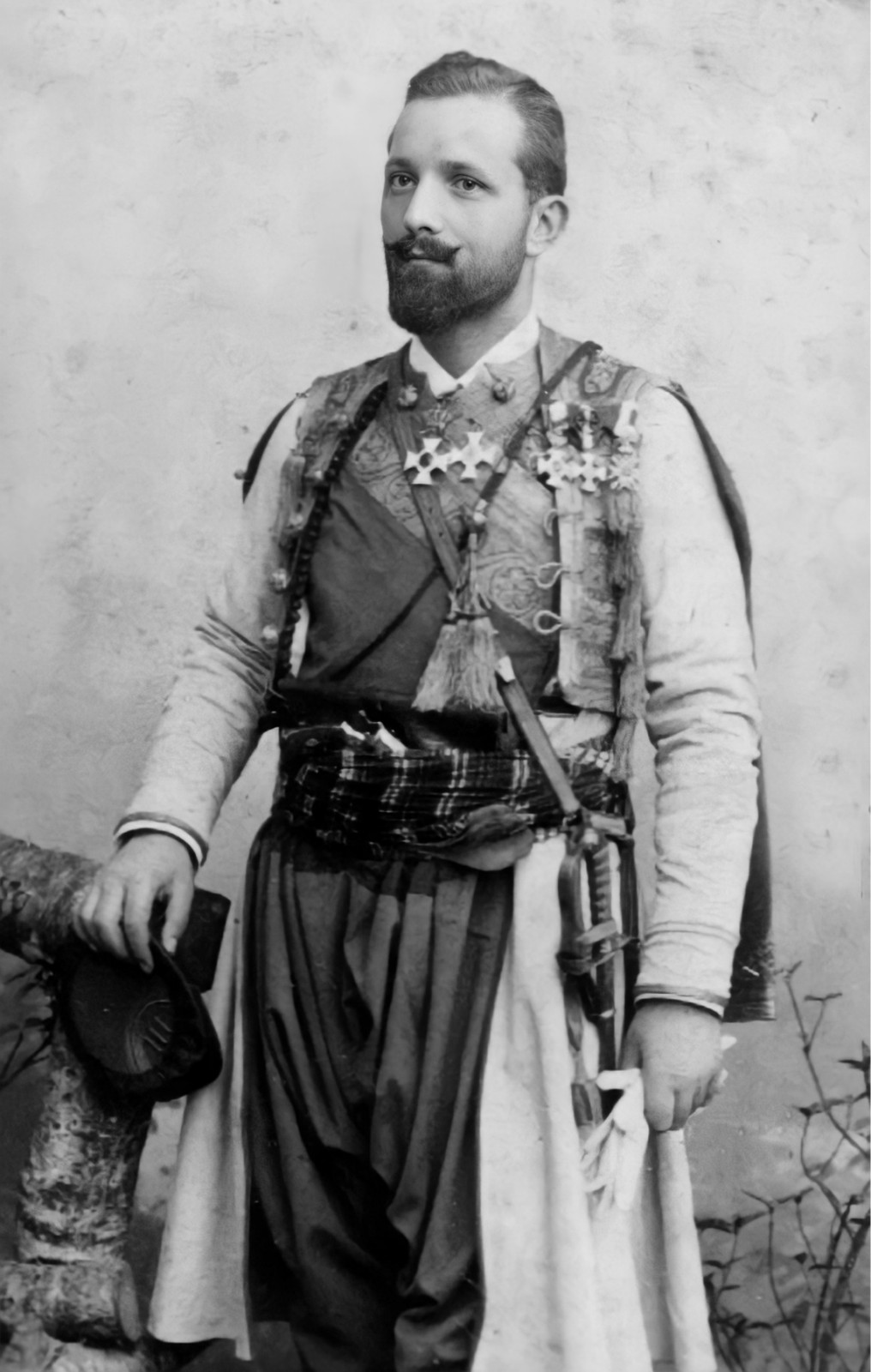
Former Prime Minister Andrija Radović established the Montenegrin Committee.

In August 1916, Radović drafted a memorandum to Nikola proposing the unification of Montenegro and Serbia, arguing that independent Montenegro could not sustain itself after an Entente victory. Radović's plan suggested that Nikola renounce his throne in favor of Prince Regent Aleksandar of Serbia, who would then be succeeded by Nikola's son, Danilo, Crown Prince of Montenegro. The proposal envisioned alternating rulers from the Serbian and Montenegrin royal dynasties on the throne of the proposed union state. Initially hesitant, Nikola eventually received encouragement from Italy (whose king, Victor Emmanuel III, was his son-in-law) to reject the offer.

Nikola ultimately declined to endorse the memorandum in January 1917, leading to Radović's resignation. Radović then emerged as a leading advocate for unification. Radović expressed his determination to sway Montenegrins against Nikola to Serbia's ambassador to Paris, Milenko Radomar Vesnić. Subsequently, Radović collaborated with Serbia to establish the Montenegrin Committee for Unification. Its inaugural proclamation was submitted for approval to Serbia's prime minister, Nikola Pašić, who advised Radović to avoid mentioning "Yugoslavia" as the new state and instead suggested using the term "other Serbian lands". Initially, the committee comprised former government ministers Pero Vučković, Danilo Gatalo, and Janko Spasojević, along with district court member Miloš Ivanović.

=== Adriatic Troops ===
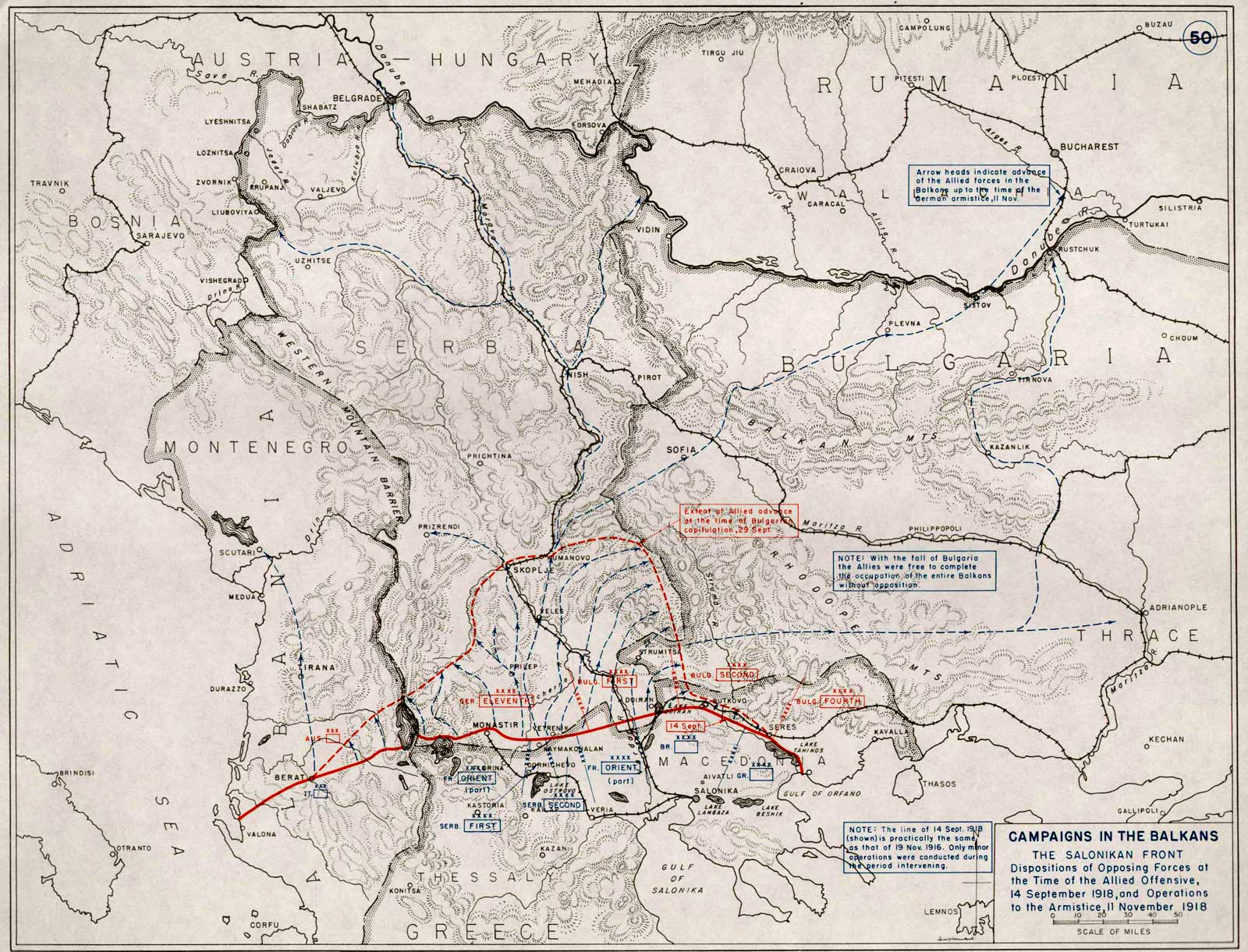
Breakthrough of the Entente powers at the Macedonian front in 1918

In September 1918, the Entente powers initiated their northward advance at the Salonica front, gradually displacing the Central Powers and reclaiming the territory of the occupied Kingdom of Serbia. Upon the insistence of General Louis Franchet d'Espèrey, the Royal Serbian Army was positioned on the western flank of the advance after reaching Skopje. This strategic maneuver aimed to ensure the army's arrival in Montenegro ahead of either supporters of Nikola or Italian forces, perceived as a threat by Serbia due to Italy's demand for the establishment of an Italian condominium in Montenegro, excluding a Serbian presence.

The Royal Serbian Army contingent assigned Colonel Dragutin Milutinović the task of gaining control of Montenegro. Milutinović's force, initially known as the Scutari Troops (Skadarske Trupe), named after the city of Shkodër, later adopting the name Adriatic Troops (Jadranske Trupe). The Adriatic Troops were composed of soldiers from the Yugoslav Division (recruited from Austro-Hungarian lands) and Serbian paramilitaries from the Kosovo region, under the leadership of Kosta Pećanac. Milutinović, instructed by Prince Regent Aleksandar, was tasked with preventing the return of Nikola I to Montenegro by any means necessary. Accompanied by Spasojević, a member of the Montenegrin Committee, and Svetozar Tomić, head of the Montenegrin section of the Serbian Foreign Ministry, Milutinović established the Central Executive Committee for the Unification of Serbia and Montenegro in Berane on 28 October. This committee, comprising Spasojević, Tomić, and Berane mayor Milosav Raičević, was responsible for organizing a popular assembly and establishing the rules for the election of assembly delegates.

In the latter part of October, while the Adriatic Troops were stationed in Berane, Montenegrin insurgents (komite) under the leadership of Jovan Radović gained control of much of the countryside. The Adriatic Troops advanced towards Podgorica, defeating an Austro-Hungarian force on the city outskirts between 30–31 October. Two days later, Radović's insurgents seized Nikšić. Austro-Hungarian forces abandoned the Montenegrin capital and withdrew from the country on 4 November, two days before the Adriatic Troops reached Cetinje. After securing Cetinje, they proceeded to Nikšić, Kolašin, and Bar. The tense atmosphere at political rallies promoting unification prompted Milutinović to request reinforcements to maintain order during the election. Milutinović ordered the disbandment of the insurgents on 12 November.

== Election ==
=== Rules ===
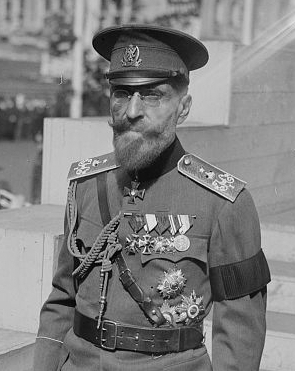
Anto Gvozdenović raised objections to the assembly election rules during the Paris Peace Conference.

The legality and legitimacy of the election rules drafted by Tomić, as well as the election itself, were at the forefront of disagreement between unionists and independentists in Montenegro in early interwar period. The latter argued that the rules were unlawful because they were not formulated by any Montenegrin legislative body and because they contradicted then existing laws and the 1905 Constitution of Montenegro. They also considered them illegitimate due to the short preparation time provided, lack of oversight over voter registers or election results, and absence of a minimum voter turnout requirement. In contrast, the unionists saw the process and the popular assembly as a form of plebiscite that legitimised the new assembly. At the time, this move was justified by the fact that two-fifths of pre-war parliamentarians were refugees abroad. Critics have pointed out that the ad hoc institution of the Great People's Assembly, resembling a popular assembly, was borrowed from Article 129 of the 1903 Constitution of Serbia. Montenegrin ambassador to the United States, Anto Gvozdenović, raised concerns at the Paris Peace Conference about the lack of proportional representation in the election rules.

The election rules, adopted in Berane on 7 November 1918, outlined the process for selecting the popular assembly's delegates. It was stipulated that the elected delegates would convene in Podgorica a week later to deliberate on Montenegro's constitutional and legal status and appoint an executive body to enforce the assembly's decisions. Eligible delegates had to be over 25 years old and have no criminal record. The election process involved selecting a slate of electors in each province, municipality, and town. Each slate of electors then chose a predetermined number of assembly delegates. Larger towns with over five thousand inhabitants elected twice as many electors and delegates as smaller towns. In total, 165 delegates were to be elected. Podgorica was chosen as the assembly venue because committee members believed that the capital, Cetinje, was a stronghold of supporters of Nikola's supporters and therefore beyond control of the assembly organisers.

Number of Podgorica Assembly electors and delegates per constituency type
Constituency type	Electors	Delegates	Notes
Province	10	2	Located in pre-First Balkan War territory
Municipality	15	3	Located in territories won in the First Balkan War
Towns over 5000 inhabitants	10	2	Cetinje, Đakovica, Peć, Pljevlja, Podgorica
Towns under 5000 inhabitants	10	1	Bar, Berane, Bijelo Polje, Kolašin, Ulcinj

=== Voting ===
The election witnessed the emergence of two distinct camps. Unionists advocated for an unconditional and immediate merger with Serbia, while their counterparts, the independists, opposed the proposed union's terms. The independents did not demand full independence of Montenegro. Instead, they advocated for a partnership where Montenegro would maintain status equal to that of Serbia, constituting an integral part of the union state rather than merely a province of Serbia. Unionists framed their call for unconditional unification as a test of patriotism and moral obligation necessary to achieve longstanding state-building goals. Financial support for the unionists came from Serbia. Candidate lists were visually differentiated by being printed on different types of paper: white for the unionists and green for the independists. Consequently, they were commonly referred to as the Whites (Bjelaši) and the Greens (Zelenaši) respectively. This division built upon existing political rifts within Montenegro, primarily revolving around the People's Party (known as the Klubaši) and the True People's Party (known as the Pravaši). These groups enjoyed varying levels of support across different regions of Montenegro. While urban populations predominantly backed the Whites, except in Cetinje, the Whites also garnered more support than the Greens among educated individuals, youth, craftsmen, tradesmen, and administrative staff.

The election, held on 19 November, resulted in a significant majority for the Whites within the newly elected assembly. There were allegations that the Royal Serbian Army obstructed supporters of independence from returning from abroad, thereby interfering with the electoral process. Similarly, the French authorities prevented Nikola from returning to Montenegro from his exile in Neuilly-sur-Seine. Voting did not take place in the town of Ulcinj, the nearby village of Vladimir, and the regions of Skadarska Krajina and Mrkojevići.

== Assembly resolutions ==
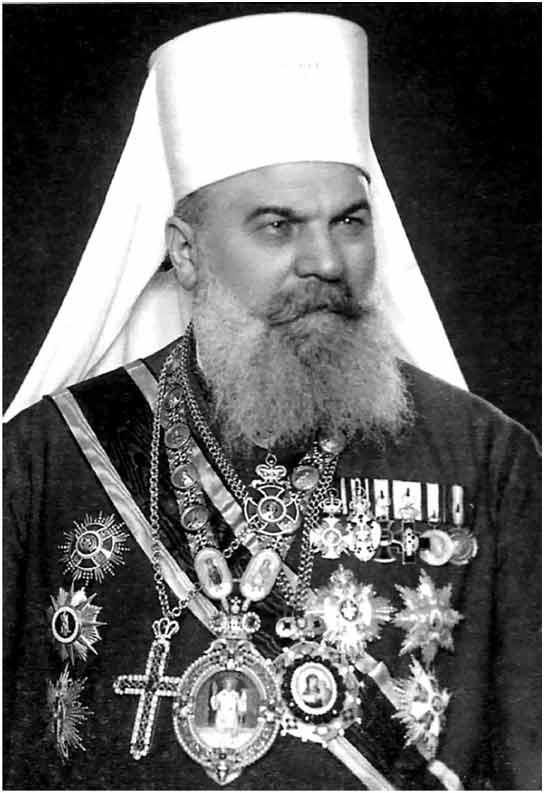
Bishop Gavrilo Dožić was designated by the Podgorica Assembly to deliver the resolution to Serbian Prince Regent Aleksandar.

The Great People's Assembly convened in the hall of the Tobacco Monopoly in Podgorica on 24 November 1918. Initially, Savo Cerović and Lazar Damjanović were elected as its president and vice-president, respectively. The following day, the assembly appointed a twenty-member committee and charged it with preparing a draft resolution for the assembly's consideration and adoption, despite an already prepared draft by Tomić being distributed to the delegates. Concurrently, the assembly articulated the unification of Montenegro and Serbia as its primary objective.

On 26 November, the assembly proceeded to read the proposed resolution, despite some individual complaints about the lack of debate on the resolution. The draft was read aloud, accompanied by occasional cheering and singing of the Serbian national anthem, "Bože pravde". The resolution comprised four points. First, it declared the removal of King Nikola I and the Petrović-Njegoš dynasty from the Montenegrin throne. Second, it specified that Montenegro and Serbia would be united under Serbia's ruling Karađorđević dynasty, joining the common state of the "three-named people" (Serbs, Croats, and Slovenes). The third point called for the election of a five-member executive committee to coordinate the unification efforts. Finally, the resolution stipulated sending notices of the resolution to Nikola, the Serbian government, as well as allied and neutral countries. The decision was unanimously adopted, with three delegates absent from the vote.

In four additional sessions held by 29 November, the assembly appointed Damjanović along with Vojvoda Stevo Vukotić (brother of Queen Consort Milena of Montenegro), Marko Daković, Spasoje Piletić, and Risto Jojić as the executive committee members. They debated the committee's tasks and appointed a fifteen-member delegation led by Bishop of the Serbian Orthodox Church Gavrilo Dožić, tasked with traveling to Belgrade and presenting the resolution to Prince Regent Aleksandar. There was also a discussion on the fate of the property of King Nikola I and the Montenegrin Orthodox Church, which was confiscated in the immediate aftermath of the assembly meetings. Finally, the assembly decided to confiscate Nikola's property and prohibit his family from returning to Montenegro. The assembly reconvened on 29 April 1919 in Podgorica to dismiss the executive committee and transfer its powers to Ivo Pavićević as the Serbian administrator for Montenegro.

== Aftermath ==
=== Unification ===
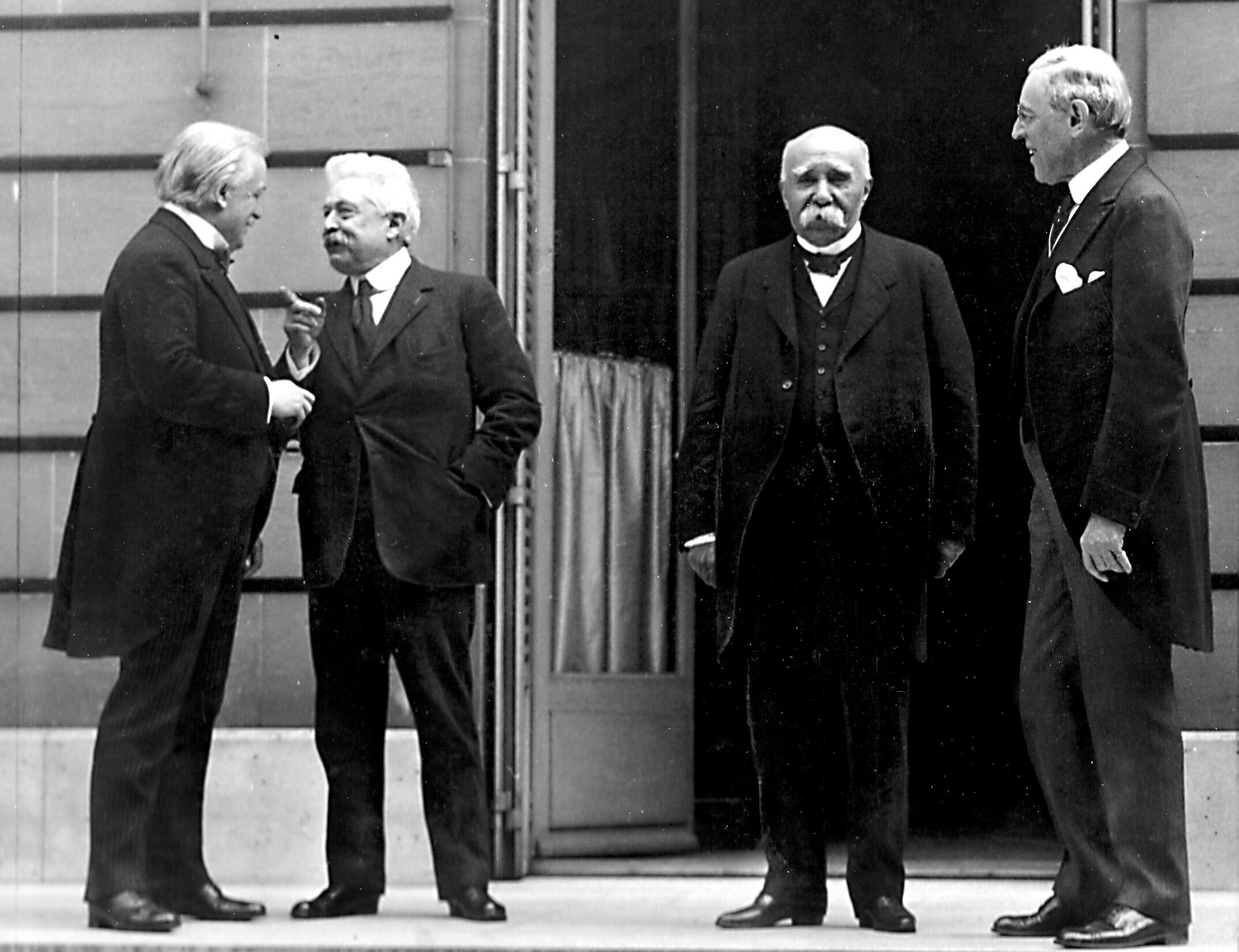
The "Big Four" could not agree on who should represent Montenegro at the Paris Peace Conference.

The unification of Serbia and Montenegro, based on the assembly's resolution, strengthened Serbia's political position shortly before the proclamation of the Kingdom of Serbs, Croats and Slovenes (later renamed Yugoslavia) on 1 December 1918. However, the assembly's approach was later criticised by some unionists as overly forceful. A month later, Nikola expressed a wish for Montenegro to preserve its autonomy and customs within the new state, emphasizing his call for a Yugoslav confederation. The Montenegrin government-in-exile rejected the assembly resolutions, arguing that they were unlawful and the body itself illegitimate. Initially, the Entente powers generally overlooked the passing of the resolutions, tacitly allowing Serbia to establish the new status quo.

The fate of Montenegro was discussed at the Paris Peace Conference, where the government-in-exile and Nikola were not involved in decision-making. The conference only invited a representative of the government-in-exile to present their position, at Nikola's insistence. Although Montenegro was formally granted a seat at the conference, it remained vacant due to disagreement over the selection of its representative. Montenegro's government-in-exile proposals were rejected by Serbia. The Serbian position prevailed because it was backed by France. In early 1919, Montenegro was divided into French, British, Italian, American, and Serbian occupation zones. However, by mid-year, the entire territory came under control of Serbian forces, renamed the Yugoslav Occupational Forces in Montenegro. France severed diplomatic ties with Montenegro on 20 December 1920 following the Constitutional Assembly election in the Kingdom of Serbs, Croats and Slovenes. The United Kingdom and the United States followed suit in January 1921, effectively removing Montenegro from international affairs.

=== Christmas Uprising ===
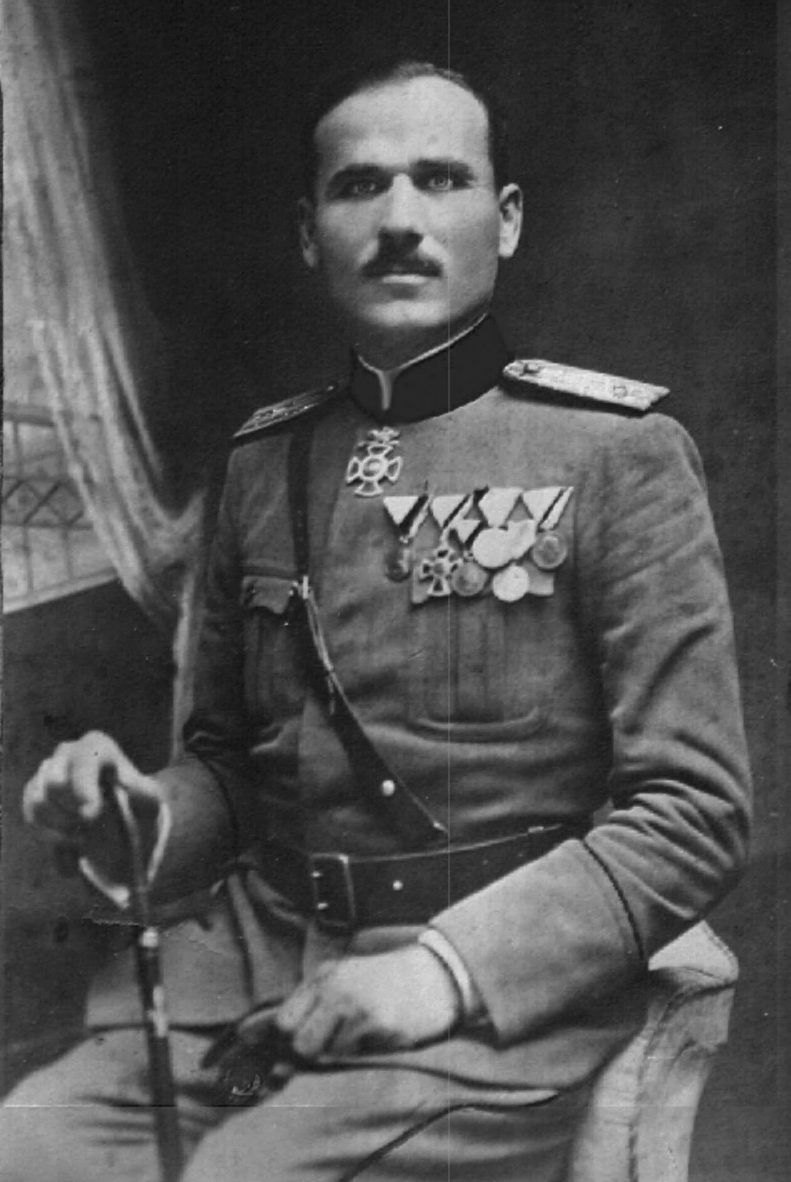
Krsto Popović was one of the leaders of the Christmas Uprising in 1919.

A portion of Montenegro's population became dissatisfied with the political developments following the Podgorica Assembly, leading to an insurrection in January 1919. The ultimately unsuccessful rebellion, known as the Christmas Uprising, was instigated by the Greens and led by Krsto Popović and Jovan Plamenac. According to the British Military Mission to Montenegro, approximately one-fifth of the population supported the rebels. Historian Ivo Banac suggested that the Greens enjoyed support from a larger proportion of the population but were comparably poorly organised, indecisive, and politically divided. While some fought for full independence and the return of Nikola to the country, others supported union with Serbia, objecting only to Montenegro's unequal status in such a union. Contemporary Western media reported heavy fighting during the uprising. The Entente occupation troops in Montenegro pursued individual national interests and policies, with the French supporting Serbia, while Italian troops supported the rebels. Italy initially supported the Montenegrin government-in-exile during negotiations over borders with the Kingdom of Serbs, Croats, and Slovenes as part of the resolution of the Adriatic question. However, after the issue was settled by the 1920 Treaty of Rapallo, Italy agreed to withdraw its support. In 1923, some of the Greens established the Montenegrin Federalist Party led by Sekula Drljević, shifting to political struggle and advocating for Montenegrin statehood within the proposed Yugoslav federation.

=== Annulment of resolutions ===
Following the collapse of the Kingdom of Yugoslavia in World War II and the subsequent establishment of the Communist-ruled federal Yugoslavia in 1945, the People's Republic of Montenegro was established as one of its constituent elements. According to a decision of the Communist Party of Yugoslavia, all citizens of the People's Republic of Montenegro were to be recorded in censuses as Montenegrins, even though most of the population identified themselves as both Montenegrins and Serbs. This decision resulted in a series of censuses where the majority (though not all) of the population of Montenegro declared themselves as Montenegrins. It also led to accusations by Serb nationalists against Montenegrin Communist leader Milovan Djilas, alleging that he "invented the Montenegrin nation". Djilas was specifically targeted because he authored a paper titled "On the Montenegrin National Question" (O crnogorskom nacionalnom pitanju). The paper became well known in the general public because, in it, Djilas argued that Montenegrins indisputably belong to the Serbian branch of South Slavs, but that they formed into a separate nation through the course of history.

Following the breakup of Yugoslavia in 1991–1992, Montenegro and Serbia remained in a rump state known as the Federal Republic of Yugoslavia (renamed Serbia and Montenegro in 2003). In 2006, Montenegro regained its independence through a referendum. In 2018, the Parliament of Montenegro voted to annul the 1918 resolution of the Podgorica Assembly on union with Serbia. The annulment resolution stated that independent Montenegro became part of the Kingdom of Serbia through a coup d'état because the Podgorica Assembly was an illegal and illegitimate body that did not reflect the will of the population of Montenegro.

== See also ==
- Great People's Assembly of Serbs, Bunjevci and other Slavs in Banat, Bačka and Baranja

== Sources ==
- Banac, Ivo (1984). The National Question in Yugoslavia: Origins, History, Politics. Ithaca, New York: Cornell University Press. ISBN 0-8014-1675-2.
- Bojović, Jovan R. (1989). Podgorička skupština 1918: dokumenta [Podgorica Assembly in 1918: Documents] (in Serbian). Gornji Milanovac: Dečje novine. ISBN 9788636702093.
- Djukanović, Bojka (2023). Historical Dictionary of Montenegro. Lanham: Rowman & Littlefield. ISBN 9781538139141.
- Fuller, Joseph V., ed. (1943). "Secretary's Notes of a Conversation Held in M. Pichon's Room at the Quai d'Orsay, Paris, on Wednesday, March 5, 1919, at 3 p.m.". Papers Relating to the Foreign Relations of the United States, The Paris Peace Conference, 1919. Vol. IV. Washington: United States Government Printing Office. OCLC 1140993210.
- Heka, László (2022). "Crnogorsko nacionalno pitanje: pravne posljedice odluka Podgoričke skupštine 1918. godine" [The Question of Nationality in Montenegro: Legal Consequences of the Decisions of Podgorica Assembly in 1918]. Politička misao: časopis za politologiju (in Croatian). 59 (1). Zagreb: Faculty of Political Science, University of Zagreb: 24–48. doi:10.20901/pm. ISSN 0032-3241.
- Littlefield, Walter (16 April 1922). "Annihilation of a Nation" (PDF). The New York Times. ISSN 0362-4331.
- Morrison, Kenneth (2008). Montenegro, A Modern History. London: I.B. Tauris. ISBN 978-0-85771-487-9.
- Pavlović, Srdja (1999). "The Podgorica Assembly in 1918: Notes on the Yugoslav Historiography (1919-1970) about the Unification of Montenegro and Serbia". Canadian Slavonic Papers. 41 (2). Milton Park, Abingdon-on-Thames: Taylor & Francis: 157–176. doi:10.1080/00085006.1999.11092211. ISSN 0008-5006. JSTOR 40870060.
- Pavlović, Srdja (2008). Balkan Anschluss: The Annexation of Montenegro and the Creation of the Common South Slavic State. West Lafayette: Purdue University Press. ISBN 978-1-55753-465-1.
- Ramet, Sabrina P. (2006). The Three Yugoslavias: State-Building and Legitimation, 1918–2005. Bloomington: Indiana University Press. ISBN 978-0-253-34656-8.
- Rastoder, Šerbo (2003). "A Short Review of the History of Montenegro". In Bieber, Florian (ed.). Montenegro in Transition. Baden-Baden: Nomos Publishing House. pp. 107–138. ISBN 9783832900724.
- Ružić, Nataša; Lalović, Vladan (2016). "Izvještavanje Glasa Crnogorca o osnivanju Kraljevine Srba, Hrvata i Slovenaca" [Reporting in the Voice of the Montenegrin on the Formation of the Kingdom of Serbs, Croats and Slovenes]. Radovi Zavoda za povijesne znanosti HAZU u Zadru (in Croatian). 58 (58). Zagreb: Croatian Academy of Sciences and Arts: 285–307. ISSN 1330-0474.
- "King Nicholas Will Meet Wilson" (PDF). The New York Times. Associated Press. 25 December 1918. ISSN 0362-4331.
- "Montenegro Puts Hope in President Wilson" (PDF). The New York Times. Associated Press. 8 November 1918. ISSN 0362-4331.
- "Serbs Wipe Out Royalist Party in Montenegro". Chicago Tribune. 3 September 1919. p. 2. ISSN 1085-6706. Archived from the original on 2 March 2010.
