= Whites (Montenegro) =

Montenegrin activists who advocated for annexation-style union with Serbia (1910s)

The Whites (Serbian: Бјелаши, romanized: Bjelaši) was the name given to pan-Serbian and Yugoslavist activists in Montenegro during and after the declaration of the Podgorica Assembly in November 1918. The Podgorica Assembly allowed the Montenegrin people to vote on the fate of the Kingdom of Montenegro. The two options were for the Kingdom of Montenegro to join the Kingdom of Serbia through an annexation-based unification or through a confederation-based unification. The name of the Whites derived from the "White List", as opposed to the "Green List", from where the Greens took their name from. The Assembly ended with overwhelming support for annexation-based unification. The movement was led by Marko Daković, Andrija Radović and Ljubomir Vuksanović. The two opposing sides clashed in the short-lived Christmas Uprising of 1919.

== Sources ==
- Srdja Pavlovic (2008). Balkan Anschluss: The Annexation of Montenegro and the Creation of the Common South Slavic State. Purdue University Press. ISBN 978-1-55753-465-1.
- Bojović, Jovan R. (1989). Podgorička skupština 1918: dokumenta. Gornji Milanovac.
- Neubacher, Hermann (2008). Nikola Živković (ed.). Specijalni zadatak Balkan. More. ISBN 9788690616923.
