= Battle of Mojkovac =

Battle during World War I (6-7 January 1916)

- Part of the Montenegrin campaign of the Serbian campaign of World War I
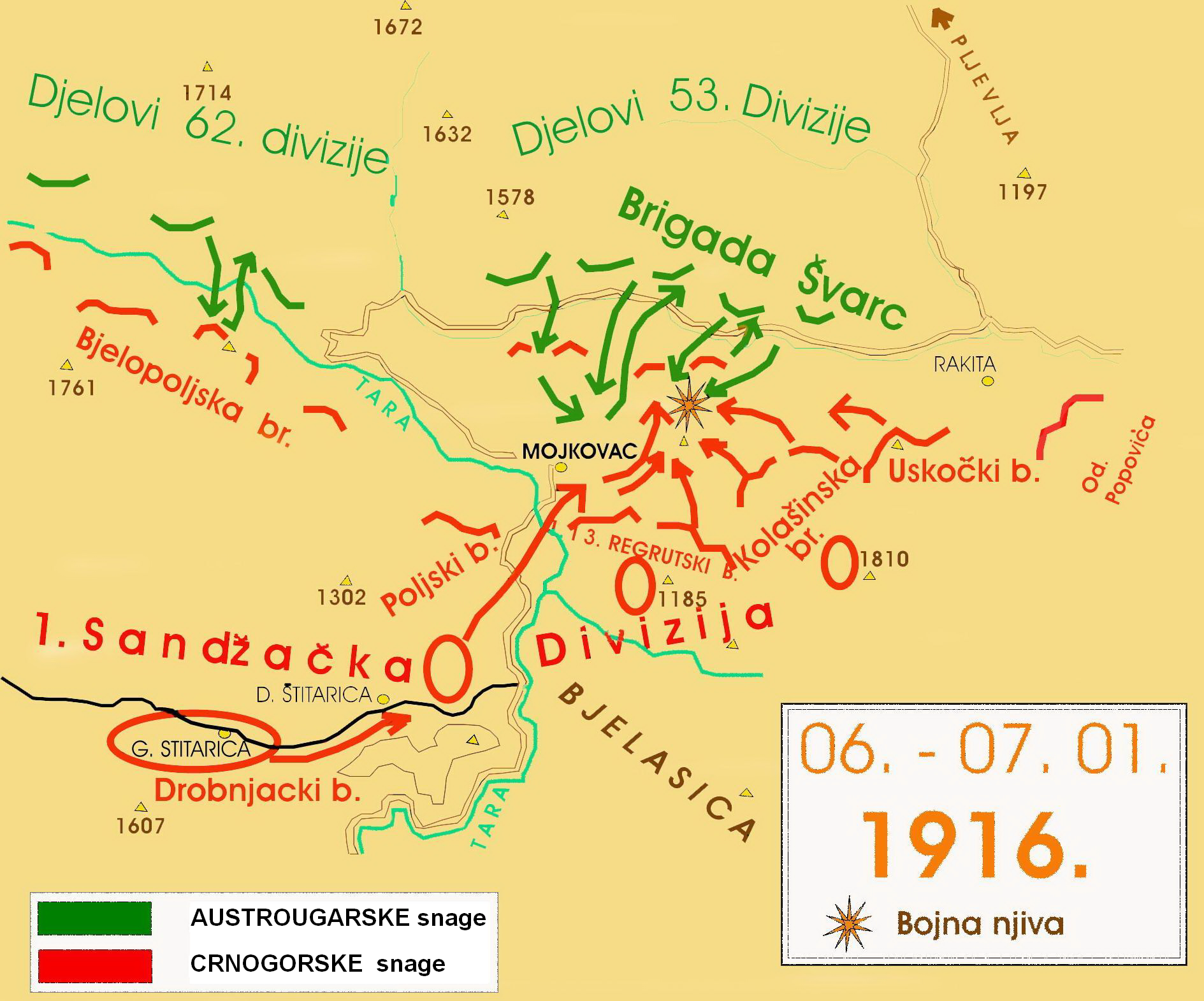
Date	6–7 January 1916
Location	Mojkovac, Kingdom of Montenegro 42.96°N 19.58°E
Result	Montenegrin victory

Belligerents
Montenegro	Austria-Hungary

Commanders and leaders
(Kingdom of Montenegro) Janko Vukotić; (Kingdom of Montenegro) Krsto Popović (POW)	(Austria-Hungary) H. K. von Kövessháza; (Austria-Hungary) Wilhelm von Reinöhl

Strength
6,500 men 25 cannons 8 machine guns	20,000 men 45 cannons

Casualties and losses
205 killed, wounded or missing	700 killed, wounded or missing (224 killed)
- Location of Mojkovac

The Battle of Mojkovac was a World War I battle fought between 6 and 7 January 1916 near Mojkovac, in today's Montenegro, between the armies of Austria-Hungary and the Kingdom of Montenegro. It ended with a decisive Montenegrin victory.

== Prelude ==
In the winter of 1915, the Montenegrin Army had been fighting the Austro-Hungarian Army for three months in Serbia. In January 1916, they had to resist the invasion of their territory. The harsh weather and lack of supplies weakened the Montenegrin Army. On 5 January 1916, they received a command to protect the retreat of the Royal Serbian Army to Corfu in Greece via Albania. Savo Lazarević was commander of Montenegrin Royal Gendarmerie which was part of Čakor Detachment during the Battle of Mojkovac.

== Battle ==
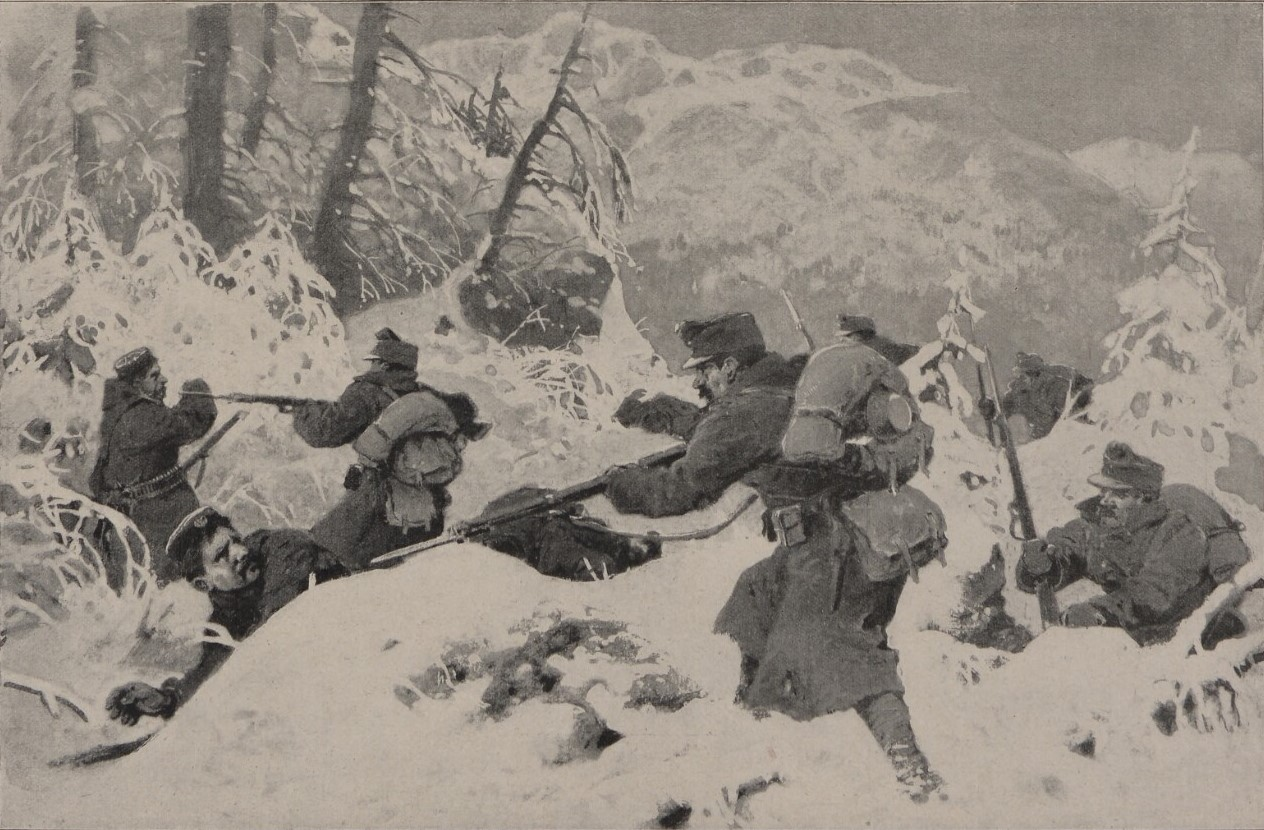
An Austro-Hungarian column advances to the Tara Gorge in pursuit of the Montenegrins (German illustration)

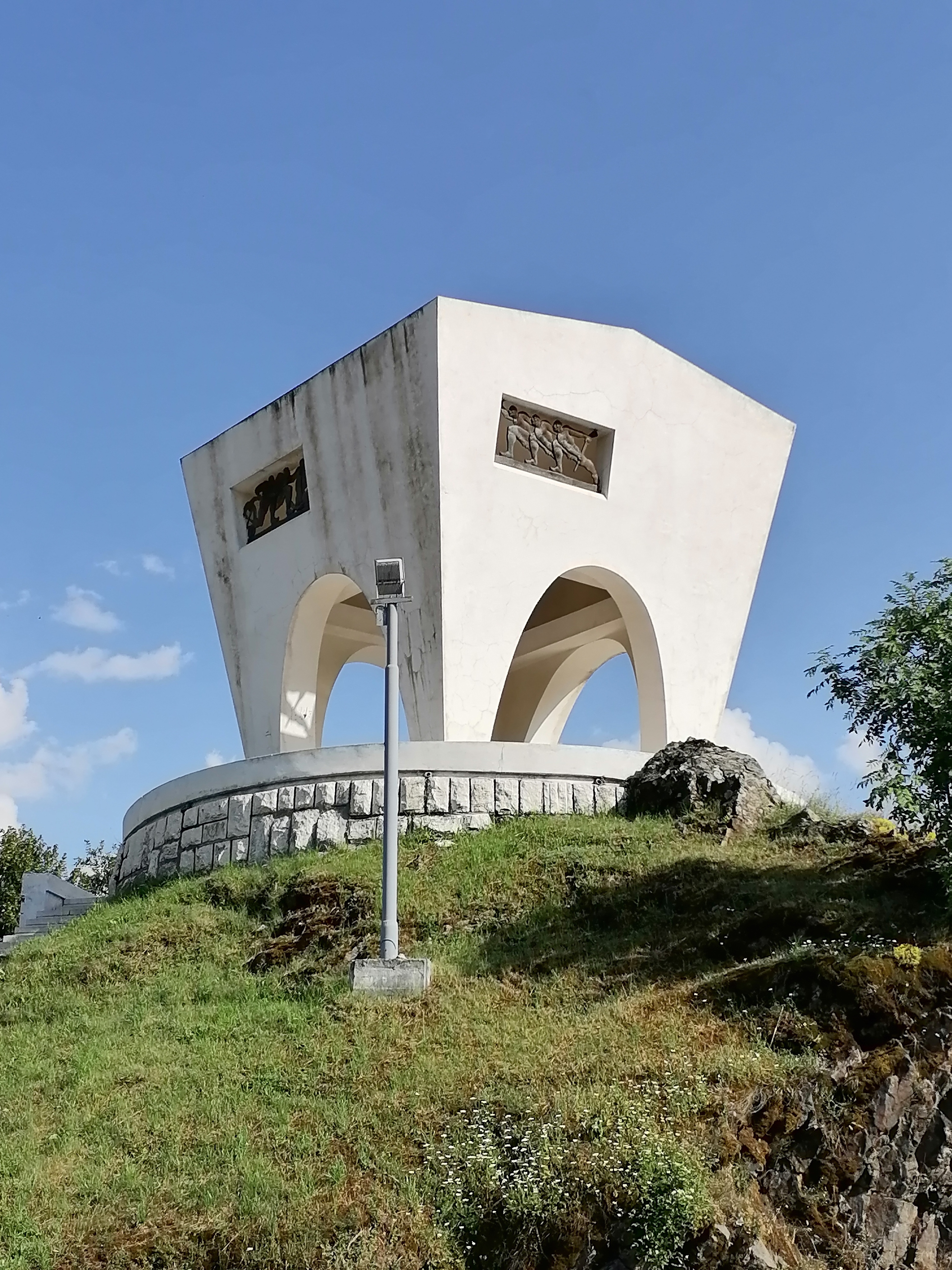
Monument to the Serbian dead of the Battle of Mojkovac at Mojkovac, Montenegro.

The fighting culminated on 6 and 7 January 1916 (on Orthodox Christmas, also known as 'Bloody Christmas'). Led by Serdar (Vojvoda) Janko Vukotić with Krsto Popović as second in command, the Montenegrins inflicted heavy casualties on the Austro-Hungarians and temporarily halted their advancement.

The Montenegrin forces had entrenched themselves around the village of Mojkovac. Austro-Hungarian Army attacked Montenegrin positions early that day along with a heavy artillery bombardment on Mojkovac itself. By noon, the Austro-Hungarian attack was repulsed, suffering heavy casualties. Fighting resumed until the Austro-Hungarian forces left the battlefield, leaving more than 2,000 Austro-Hungarian soldiers dead. By the end of the day, Montenegrin forces managed to push back multiple attacks by Austro-Hungarian forces taking back control of Mojkovac and its surroundings. Much of the fighting was done hand-to-hand with fixed bayonets and knives, in knee-deep snow.

On 7 January, the Austro-Hungarians launched a second attack on Montenegrin positions. The attack again failed, with heavy losses on both sides. Despite having a much stronger, bigger, and better-equipped army, Austro-Hungarian forces abandoned their positions in Mojkovac on the 7th and retreated.

== Results ==
There is considerable disagreement about the actual conduct of the battle, but the Montenegrins forced a numerically superior foe to retreat. The battle was intended to give the Royal Serbian Army enough time to reach the Albanian mountains in their retreat to Corfu, but in fact, most of the Serbian troops had already crossed the mountains and reached the coast and were battling their way south between Scutari (Shkodër) and Durazzo (Durrës).

The Montenegrin forces continued to hold the Berane-Andrijevica-Mojkovac-Tara River line until withdrawing on 18 January. The Austrians then continued pushing their offensive south.

In the meantime, the Austro-Hungarians had already taken Mount Lovćen (11/1), the capital Cetinje (13/1), Peć and Berane (10/1).

Some historians indicate that at the time of the battle King Nicholas was already in surrender negotiations and that several units had already surrendered, while others hold that King Nicholas did not agree to negotiate until 12 January. However, by 25 January the entire army of Montenegro had laid down its weapons.

Generalmajor Reinöhl said of the battle: "The courage of the Montenegrin soldier has no equal in the history of wars. Here you could see the Montenegrin soldier attacking the enemy's bayonets with his bare hands. That numerically small army, armed with primitive weapons, on the terrain of Mojkovac for days stopped the much more numerous Austro-Hungarian Army, equipped with modern arms."

== See also ==
- Serbian campaign
