= Marko Daković =

Montenegrin politician

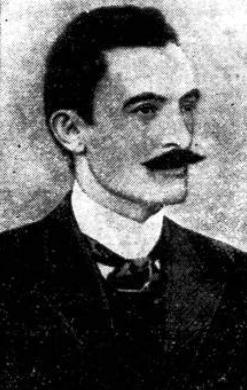
Marko Daković

Marko Daković (Serbian Cyrillic: Марко Даковић; 20 February 1880 – 16 April 1941) was a Montenegrin politician and lawyer, independent MP in the National Assembly of Serbs, Croats and Slovenes, and 1941 minister in General Simović's Cabinet. He was the leader of the movement for unification of Montenegro with the Kingdom of Serbia and Yugoslavia in 1918, and one of the most prominent figures in the political life of Montenegro in the interwar period.

Daković was born on February 20, 1880, in Grahovo, in the Nikšić district of the Principality of Montenegro. He finished elementary school in his hometown, and gymnasium and the Faculty of Law in Belgrade, in the Kingdom of Serbia. Marko Daković was unofficially named the leader of the "United Serb Youth of Montenegro". He is one of the founders of the Association of Montenegrin Students at the University of Belgrade, which was critical of King Nikola's regime in Montenegro, result was an indictment against Montenrgrin students, including Daković. The indictment charged them for insulting the king and the court with one of their proclamations.

At the informal 1918 elections, he was elected a member of the disputed Podgorica Assembly; he was also a member of the Executive Board of the Assembly. After the unification of Montenegro with Serbia, Daković was the head of the Provisional National Council of Montenegro, within newly founded Kingdom of Serbs, Croats and Slovenes, from 1919 until 1921.

He died in a plane crash.
