= Government of Marko Radulović =

- 3rd Cabinet of Principality of Montenegro
- 1906–1907
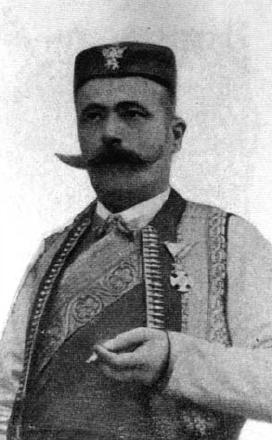
- Marko Radulović
- Date formed: November 24, 1906
- Date dissolved: February 1, 1907

People and organisations
- Head of state: Nicholas I
- Head of government: Marko Radulović
- No. of ministers: 5
- Member parties: Independent, People's Party

History
- Predecessor: First government of Lazar Mijušković
- Successor: First government of Andrija Radović

The government of Marko Radulović lasted from 11 November 1906 to 19 January 1907 (according to the old calendar).

== History ==
The first-term leader of the People's Party formed a government with younger people who worked as civil servants in the state administration.

== Cabinet ==
Portfolio	Minister	Party	In office
Prime Minister	Marko Radulović	People's Party	24 November – 1 February 1907
Minister of Foreign Affairs	Marko Radulović	People's Party	24 November – 1 February 1907
Minister of the Interior	Mihailo Ivanović	People's Party	24 November – 1 February 1907
Minister of Justice	Milosav R. Raičević	People's Party	24 November – 1 February 1907
Minister of Education and Ecclesiastical Affairs	Milosav R. Raičević	People's Party	24 November – 1 February 1907
Minister of War	Danilo Gatalo	Independent	24 November – 1 February 1907
Minister of Finance and Construction	Mitar Đurović	Independent	24 November – 1 February 1907
