= First government of Lazar Mijušković =

Government of Lazar Mijušković I
- 2th Cabinet of Principality of Montenegro
- 1905–1906
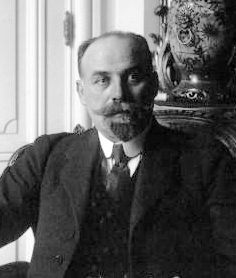
- Lazar Mijušković
- Date formed: December 19, 1905
- Date dissolved: November 24, 1906

People and organisations
- Head of state: Nicholas I
- Head of government: Lazar Mijušković
- No. of ministers: 5
- Member parties: Independent, People's Party, True People's Party

History
- Election: September 27, 1906
- Predecessor: Government of Božo Petrović-Njegoš
- Successor: First government of Lazar Tomanović

The first government of Lazar Mijušković was the first term of Lazar Mijušković in the Principality of Montenegro, lasting from 6 December 1905 to 11 November 1906 (according to the old calendar).

== History ==
Before the proclamation of the Constitution in Montenegro in 1905, a government headed by Lazar Mijušković, former Consul in Shkodër and Minister of Finance, was appointed to establish the new constitutional order. Its task was also to prepare the Law for the first constitutional elections to the National Assembly.

== Cabinet ==
Portfolio	Minister	Party	In office
Prime Minister	Lazar Mijušković	True People's Party	19 December 1905 – 24 November 1906
Minister of Foreign Affairs	Lazar Mijušković	True People's Party	19 December 1905 – 24 November 1906
Minister of the Interior	Labud Gojnić	True People's Party	19 December 1905 – 24 November 1906
Minister of Finance and Construction	Andrija Radović	People's Party	19 December 1905 – 24 November 1906
Minister of War	Janko Vukotić	Independent	19 December 1905 – 24 November 1906
Minister of Justice	Milo Dožić	Independent	19 December 1905 – 24 November 1906
Minister of Education and Ecclesiastical Affairs	Milo Dožić	Independent	19 December 1905 – 24 November 1906
