= First government of Janko Vukotić =

Government of Janko Vukotić I
- 5th Cabinet of Kingdom of Montenegro
- 1913–1914
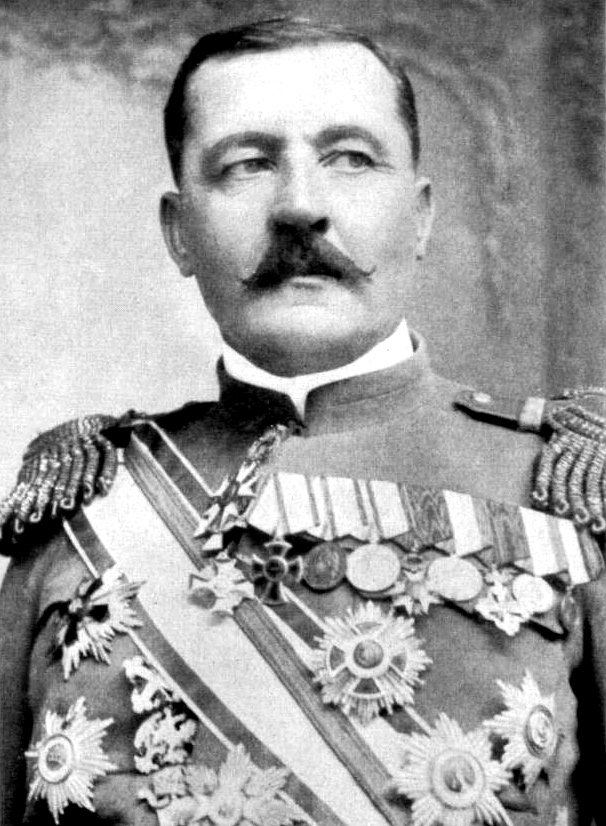
- Janko Vukotić
- Date formed: May 8, 1913
- Date dissolved: April 25, 1914

People and organisations
- Head of state: Nicholas I
- Head of government: Janko Vukotić
- No. of ministers: 6
- Member parties: Independent, True People's Party, People's Party

History
- Election: January 11, 1914
- Predecessor: Government of Mitar Martinović
- Successor: Second government of Janko Vukotić

The first government of Janko Vukotić was the government of the Kingdom of Montenegro, which lasted from 8 May 1913 to 25 April 1914, under the leadership of Serdar Janko Vukotić.

== History ==
In April 1913, due to disagreement with the abandonment of Shkodër, the government of Mitar Martinović resigned, and a new cabinet was formed by Brigadier Janko Vukotić. He served as Prime Minister twice (8 May 1913 – 25 April 1914) and (25 April 1914 – 10 September 1915).

== Cabinet ==
Portfolio	Minister	Party	In office
Prime Minister	Janko Vukotić	Independent	8 May 1913 – 25 April 1914
Minister of War	Janko Vukotić	Independent	8 May 1913 – 25 April 1914
Minister of Finance and Construction	Risto Popović	Independent	8 May 1913 – 25 April 1914
Minister of Education and Ecclesiastical Affairs	Mirko M. Mijušković	Independent	8 May 1913 – 25 April 1914
Minister of Foreign Affairs	Petar Plamenac	True People's Party	8 May 1913 – 25 April 1914
Minister of the Interior	Labud Gojnić	True People's Party	8 May 1913 – 25 April 1914
Minister of Justice	Ljubomir A. Bakić	People's Party	8 May 1913 – 25 April 1914
