= 1905 Montenegrin Constitutional Assembly election =

- 27 November 1905

All 76 seats to the National Assembly
| | First party |
|---|---|
| Party | Independents |
| Seats won | 60 / 60 |
| | Third party |
| Leader | Šako Petrović-Njegoš |
| Party | People's Deputies |
| Seats won | 27 / 60 |
Prime Minister before election
Božo Petrović-Njegoš
Independent
Subsequent Prime Minister
Lazar Mijušković
Independent

National Assembly elections were held in Montenegro on 27 November 1905. They were the first elections in the country's history, and were called to elect a National Assembly that would approve a constitution.

== Background ==
| Božo Petrović-Njegoš, Prime Minister before | Lazar Mijušković, Elected Prime Minister |

Prince Nicholas had issued a manifesto on 5 November 1905 announcing the establishment of a representative assembly with free elections. One member was elected from each of the 56 military districts of the country, with a further four members elected from Cetinje, Nikšić, Podgorica and Ulcinj.

== Aftermath ==
The new Parliament of Montenegro was opened in Cetinje on 19 December 1905, where a first liberal constitution was proclaimed, converting the Principality of Montenegro into a constitutional monarchy.

The government was appointed by the prince and consisted of six ministers and three ecclesiastical deputies representing the Orthodox Church, the Catholic Church and Muslims. Elections to the first Parliament were held the following year.
