= Second government of Janko Vukotić =

Government of Janko Vukotić II
- 6th Cabinet of Kingdom of Montenegro
- 1914–1915
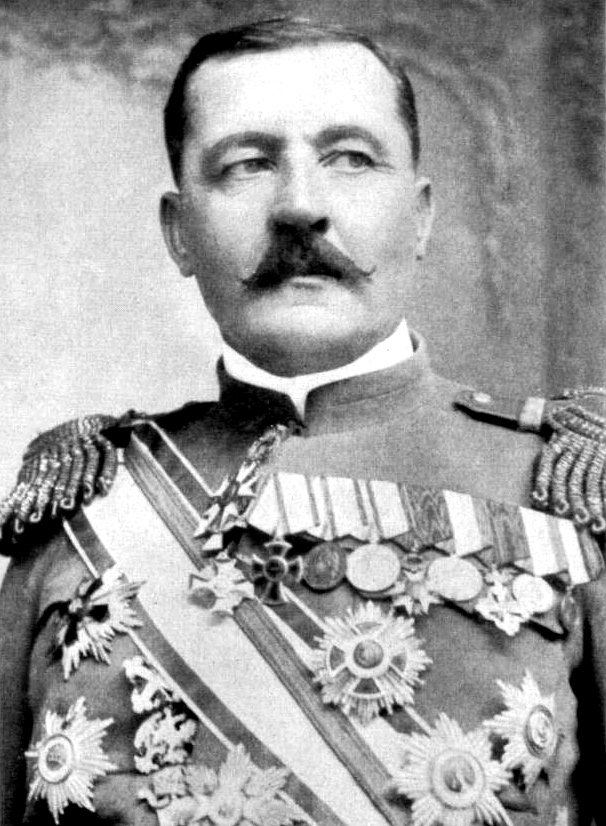
- Janko Vukotić
- Date formed: April 25, 1914
- Date dissolved: September 10, 1915

People and organisations
- Head of state: Nicholas I
- Represented by: Risto Popović
- Head of government: Janko Vukotić
- No. of ministers: 7
- Member parties: Independent, People's Party, True People's Party

History
- Predecessor: First government of Janko Vukotić
- Successor: Third government of Janko Vukotić

The second government of Janko Vukotić was the government of the Kingdom of Montenegro, which lasted from 25 April 1914 to 10 September 1915, under the leadership of Serdar Janko Vukotić.

== History ==
When World War I began and Vukotić took part in the battlefield, he was replaced by ministers Risto Popović and Mirko Mijušković.

== Cabinet ==
Portfolio	Minister	Party	In office
Prime Minister	Janko Vukotić	Independent	25 April 1914 – 10 September 1915
Prime Minister	Risto Popović	Independent	17 July 1914 – 10 September 1915 (Interim)
Minister of Finance and Construction	Risto Popović	Independent	25 April 1914 – 10 September 1915
Minister of War	Risto Popović	Independent	17 July 1914 – 16 July 1915 (Interim)
Minister of War	Janko Vukotić	Independent	17 July 1914 – 16 July 1915
Minister of War	Mašan Božović	Independent	16 July – 10 September 1915
Minister of the Interior	Savo P. Vuletić	Independent	25 April 1914 – 10 September 1915
Minister of Education and Ecclesiastical Affairs	Gavrilo Cerović	Independent	25 April 1914 – 10 September 1915
Minister of Foreign Affairs	Petar Plamenac	True People's Party	25 April 1914 – 10 September 1915
Minister of Justice	Ljubomir A. Bakić	People's Party	25 April 1914 – 10 September 1915
