= 1906 Montenegrin parliamentary election =

1906 Montenegrin legislative election
- 27 September 1906
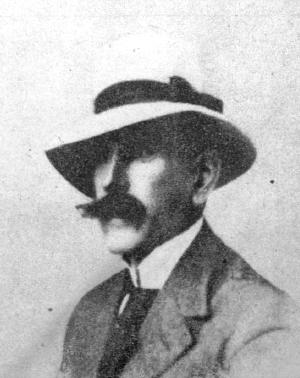
	First party
Leader	Mihailo Ivanović
Party	People's Party
Seats won	51 / 76
	Third party
Party	Independents
Seats won	25 / 76
PM before election
Lazar Mijušković
Independent
Subsequent PM
Marko Radulović
People's Party

Parliamentary elections were held in Montenegro on 27 September 1906, electing the country's first Parliament. The result was a victory for the People's Party, the first political group in Montenegro, which won 51 seats.

== Electoral system ==
The elections were held under the electoral law passed on 24 June. The new National Assembly of Montenegro (parliament) consisted of 62 elected members (6 from small towns and 56 from captaincies) and 14 appointees.

== Aftermath ==
The newly elected Parliament met for the first time in Cetinje on 31 October. Šako Petrović-Njegoš was elected as the first President of the Parliament.

Following the elections, the People's Party formed the first party-led government with Marko Radulović as Prime Minister. In February 1907, Andrija Radović, also a People's Party member, replaced Radulović as the head of the government.
