= 1907 Montenegrin parliamentary election =

1907 Montenegrin legislative election
- 31 October 1907
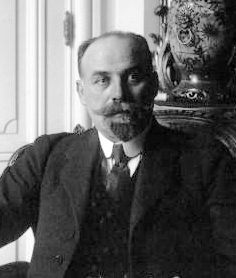
	First party
Leader	Lazar Mijušković
Party	TPP + aligned Independents
Seats won	76 / 76
Prime Minister before election
Andrija Radović
People's Party
Subsequent Prime Minister
Lazar Tomanović
Independent

Parliamentary elections were held in Montenegro on 31 October 1907.

== Background ==
The elections were boycotted by the People's Party (The Club members), which had complained of intimidation and claimed that they had been portrayed as hostile to Prince Nicholas. The offices of the People's Party's journal in Nikšić were wrecked on two occasions, whilst a café known to be a meeting place of People's Party members was also attacked. The newly-formed royalist True People's Party (The Rightists) were supported by the royal court and the army.

== Aftermath ==
The newly elected National Assembly of Montenegro (parliament) met for the first time on 21 November 1907. Following the elections, 150 members of the boycotting People's Party (NS) were arrested for alleged treason.
