= Second government of Andrija Radović =

Government of Andrija Radović I
- 2nd Cabinet of Kingdom of Montenegro in-Exile
- 1916–1917
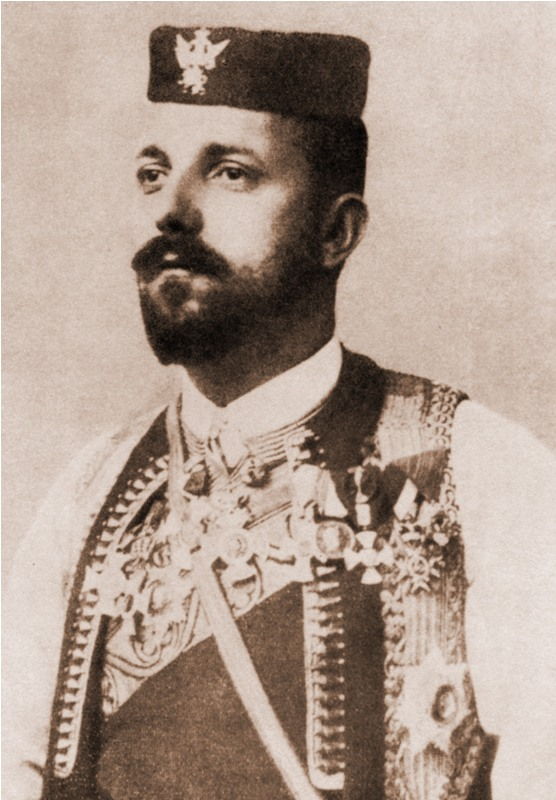
- Andrija Radović
- Date formed: May 12, 1916
- Date dissolved: January 17, 1917

People and organisations
- Head of state: Nicholas I
- Head of government: Andrija Radović
- No. of ministers: 4
- Member parties: Independent, People's Party

History
- Predecessor: Second government of Lazar Mijušković
- Successor: Government of Milo Matanović

In exile in France, Andrija Radović (12 May 1916 – 17 January 1917) formed a new government. Due to King Nicholas' abdication and refusal to annex Montenegro to Serbia, Andrija Radović resigned.

== Cabinet ==
Portfolio	Minister	Party	In office
Prime Minister	Andrija Radović	People's Party	12 May 1916 – 17 January 1917
Minister of Foreign Affairs	Andrija Radović	People's Party	12 May 1916 – 17 January 1917
Minister of Finance and Construction	Andrija Radović	People's Party	12 May 1916 – 17 January 1917
Minister of the Interior	Pero Vučković	Independent	12 May 1916 – 17 January 1917
Minister of Education and Ecclesiastical Affairs	Pero Vučković	Independent	12 May 1916 – 17 January 1917
Minister of Justice	Janko Spasojević	Independent	12 May 1916 – 17 January 1917
Minister of War	Milo Matanović	Independent	12 May 1916 – 17 January 1917
