= Third government of Janko Vukotić =

Government of Janko Vukotić III
- 7th Cabinet of Kingdom of Montenegro
- 1915–1916
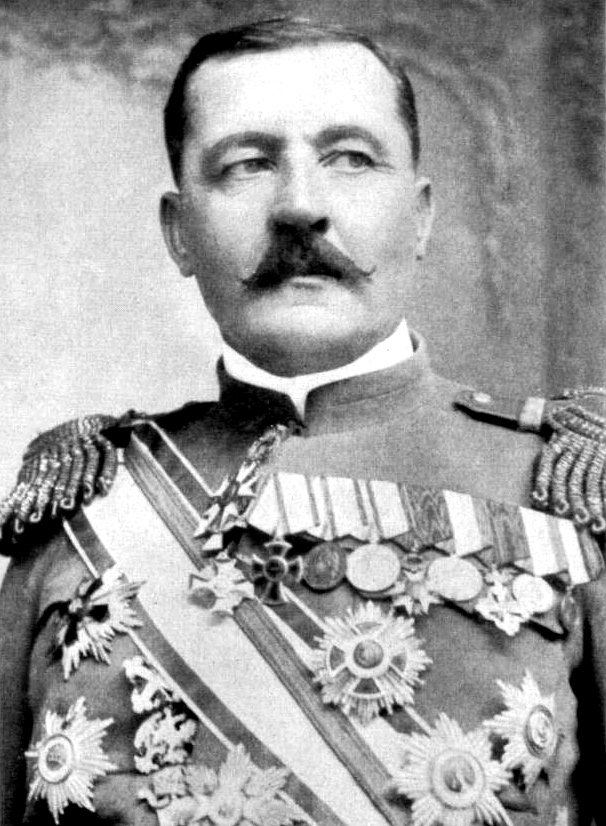
- Janko Vukotić
- Date formed: September 9, 1915
- Date dissolved: January 2, 1916

People and organisations
- Head of state: Nicholas I
- Represented by: Risto Popović; Mirko M. Mijušković
- Head of government: Janko Vukotić
- No. of ministers: 7
- Member parties: Independent, People's Party

History
- Predecessor: Second government of Janko Vukotić
- Successor: Second government of Lazar Mijušković

The third government of Janko Vukotić was the government of the Kingdom of Montenegro, which lasted from 9 September 1915 to 2 January 1916, under the leadership of Serdar Janko Vukotić.

== History ==
In early December 1915, the Montenegrin government proposed to King Nicholas a detailed plan for the evacuation of state institutions and the withdrawal of the army to Shkodër. According to this plan, the evacuation was to be: First from Cetinje to Podgorica, and then, if necessary, to Shkodër and beyond... According to this plan, the king and members of the court were to be evacuated, and the army was to fight as much as it could and withdraw according to the needs of the king and the government. The remaining population was to act as it could and wanted.

== Cabinet ==
| Portfolio | Minister | Party | In office |
|---|---|---|---|
| Prime Minister | Janko Vukotić | Independent | 9 September 1915 – 2 January 1916 |
| Prime Minister | Risto Popović | Independent | 9 September 1915 – 2 January 1916 (Interim) |
| Prime Minister | Mirko M. Mijušković | Independent | 3 October 1915 – 2 January 1916 (Interim) |
| Minister of Finance and Construction | Mirko M. Mijušković | Independent | 9 September 1915 – 2 January 1916 |
| Minister of Foreign Affairs | Mirko M. Mijušković | Independent | 3 October 1915 – 2 January 1916 (Interim) |
| Minister of Foreign Affairs | Janko Vukotić | Independent | 9 September 1915 – 2 January 1916 |
| Minister of the Interior | Savo Vuletić | Independent | 9 September 1915 – 2 January 1916 |
| Minister of Education and Ecclesiastical Affairs | Gavrilo Cerović | Independent | 9 September 1915 – 2 January 1916 |
| Minister of War | Mašan Božović | Independent | 9 September 1915 – 2 January 1916 |
| Minister of Justice | Ljubomir A. Bakić | People's Party | 9 September 1915 – 2 January 1916 |
