= 1946 Montenegrin parliamentary election =

1946 Montenegrin Constitutional Assembly election
← 1938 (Yugoslavia)	3 November 1946	1950 →
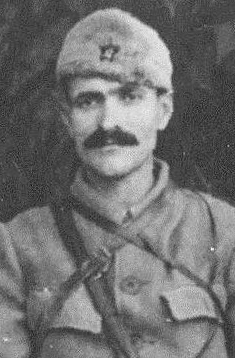
	First party
Leader	Blažo Jovanović
Party	Communist Party & aligned Independents
Seats won	125 / 125
Prime Minister before election
Blažo Jovanović
Communist Party
Subsequent Prime Minister
Blažo Jovanović
Communist Party

Constitutional Assembly elections were held in the Socialist Republic of Montenegro on 3 November 1946. They were the first elections in Montenegro in which women had the right to vote, and three women were elected to the Assembly; Lidija Jovanović, Dobrila Ojdanić and Draginja Vušović.

== Background ==
After Montenegro became part Yugoslavia following World War I, the Montenegrin parliament was abolished. During World War II, a Montenegrin legislature was revived when the State Anti-fascist Council for the National Liberation of Montenegro and Boka was established. This became the Montenegrin Anti-Fascist Assembly of National Liberation (CASNO) in 1944.

On 15 April 1945 the CASNO was renamed the Montenegrin National Assembly, before it became the National Assembly on 15 February 1946.

== Aftermath ==
After adopting the new constitution of the People's Republic of Montenegro, the Assembly was converted into a National Assembly, which served out the parliamentary term until the 1950.

Petar Komnenić was the President of the Assembly until 1949, when he was replaced by Đuro Čagorović.
