= Government of Mitar Martinović =

- 4th Cabinet of Kingdom of Montenegro
- 1912–1913
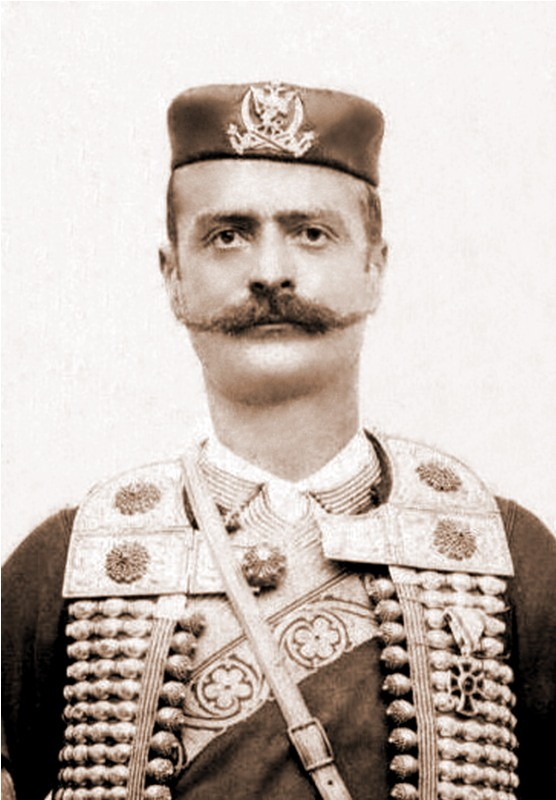
- Mitar Martinović
- Date formed: June 19, 1912
- Date dissolved: May 8, 1913

People and organisations
- Head of state: Nicholas I
- Represented by: Dušan Vukotić
- Head of government: Mitar Martinović
- No. of ministers: 4
- Member parties: Independent, True People's Party

History
- Predecessor: Fourth government of Lazar Tomanović
- Successor: First government of Janko Vukotić

During the Balkan Wars (1912–1913), a right-wing cabinet was in power with General Mitar Martinović as president (19 June 1912 – 8 May 1913). He was Minister of War and commander in the field, so in his absence he was represented by Minister of Finance Dušan Vukotić.

In April 1913, due to disagreement with the abandonment of Shkodër, this government resigned, and a new cabinet was formed by Brigadier Janko Vukotić.

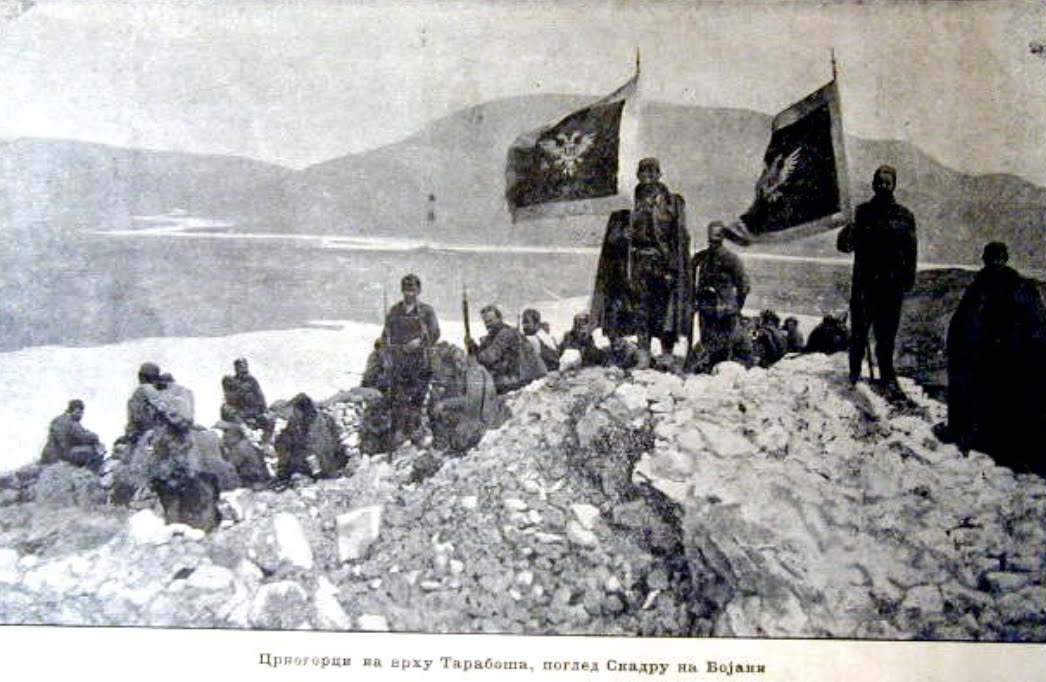
Royal Montenegrin Army next toShkodër, in Taraboš

== Cabinet ==
Portfolio	Minister	Party	In office
Prime Minister	Mitar Martinović	True People's Party	19 June 1912 – 8 May 1913
Prime Minister	Dušan Vukotić	Independent	8 October 1912 – 8 May 1913 (Interim)
Minister of Foreign Affairs	Dušan Vukotić	Independent	8 October 1912 – 8 May 1913 (Interim)
Minister of Foreign Affairs	Mitar Martinović	True People's Party	19 June 1912 – 8 May 1913
Minister of War	Mitar Martinović	True People's Party	19 June 1912 – 8 May 1913
Minister of War	Dušan Vukotić	Independent	8 October 1912 – 8 May 1913 (Interim)
Minister of Justice	Dušan Vukotić	Independent	19 June 1912 – 8 May 1913
Minister of the Interior	Jovan Plamenac	True People's Party	19 June 1912 – 8 May 1913
Minister of Education and Ecclesiastical Affairs	Jovan Plamenac	True People's Party	19 June 1912 – 8 May 1913
Minister of Finance and Construction	Sekula Drljević	True People's Party	19 June 1912 – 8 May 1913
