= 1911 Montenegrin parliamentary election =

1911 election in Montenegro

1911 Montenegrin legislative election
- 27 September 1911
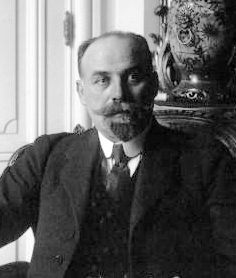
	First party
Leader	Lazar Mijušković
Party	TPP + aligned Independents
Seats won	53 / 62
	Third party
Party	Independents (Opposition)
Seats won	9 / 62
Prime Minister before election
Lazar Tomanović
Independent
Subsequent Prime Minister
Lazar Tomanović
Independent

Parliamentary elections were held in Montenegro on 27 September 1911.

== Background ==
These were the first parliamentary elections in Montenegro after the state was declared the Kingdom in 1910. Although the True People's Party was the only legal political organization in the country, a group of members of the banned opposition People's Party ran as independent candidates.

== Results ==
The elections resulted in the re-election of Prime Minister Lazar Tomanović and True People's Party government, which was unconditionally loyal to Nicholas I. Tomanović's government was returned to office with a large majority.

== Aftermath ==
Parliament of Montenegro reconvened on 31 October. However, when the President of the Parliament was elected on 11 December, the government candidate was defeated, leading to the government resigning.
