= 1914 Montenegrin parliamentary election =

- 11 January 1914

All 62 seats in the National Assembly 32 seats needed for a majority
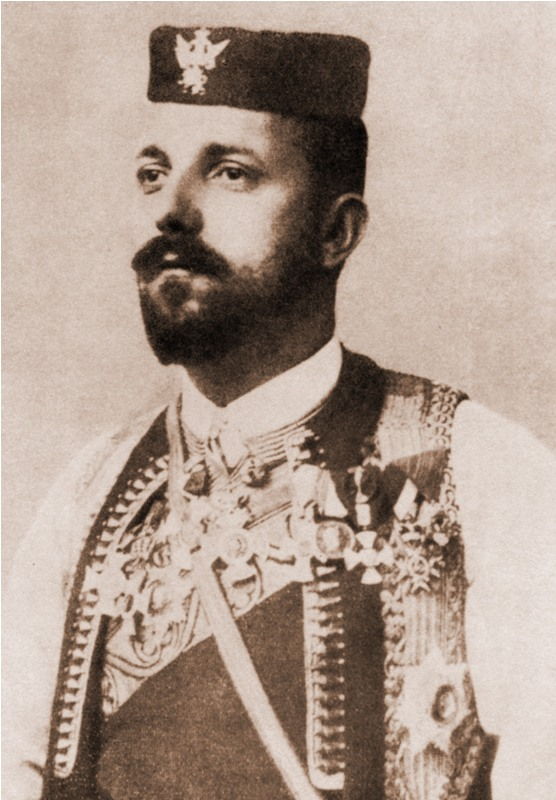

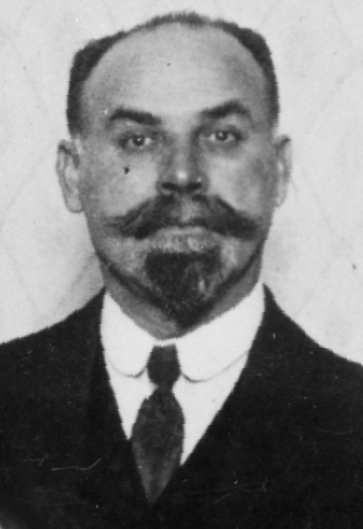

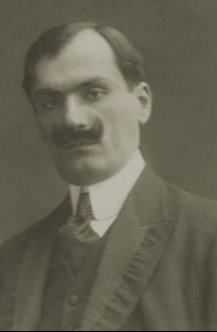
	First party	Second party	Third party
Leader	Andrija Radović	Lazar Mijušković	Jovan Plamenac
Party	People's	Mijušković group	True People's
Seats won	25 / 62	17 / 62	6 / 62
Seat change	▲25	▲17	▼52
Prime Minister before election
Serdar Janko Vukotić
Independent, military
Subsequent Prime Minister
Serdar Janko Vukotić
Independent, military

Parliamentary elections were held in Montenegro on 11 January 1914. These were the last parliamentary elections in the Kingdom of Montenegro, which was abolished and annexed to Serbia in November 1918.

== Overview ==
The People's Party, which had been banned for more than seven years, won the election with the platform of unification of Montenegro with Serbia, whilst the governing True People's Party won just four elected seats.

The "Working Bloc coalition" led by the People's Party, which won an absolute majority of votes and 25 MPs, formed a parliamentary majority of 44 seats in alliance with the "Mijuškovićko-Jabučka grupa" (former members of the True People's Party rallied around a former party leader Lazar Mijušković), which won 17 seats, and Marko Daković's "Unified Serb Youth" list (2 seats).

== Results ==
Party	Seats		
Party	Elected	Appointed	Total
People's Party	25	0	25
Mijušković group	17	0	17
True People's Party	4	2	6
United Serb Youth	2	0	2
Independents	0	12	12
Total	48	14	62

== Aftermath ==
After the election, Army General Janko Vukotić remains in office as Prime Minister, this time with the support of a new parliamentary majority, which becomes part of his new cabinet, which lasted until 16 July 1915 and Vukotić resignation.

At the end of December 1915, Lazar Mijušković succeed to arrange for the formation of a new government, which was formed in early January 1916, just a two weeks before the Montenegrin capitulation in World War I, the cabinet continued in exile.
