= Narodna misao =

Newspaper

Narodna misao (Serbian Cyrillic: Народна мисао, English: "People's Thought") was a short-lived Montenegrin weekly political newspaper, founded and published in the town of Nikšić, by members of People's Party, as the official gazette of the party that advocated the unification of Montenegro and Serbia and overthrow of the Petrovic-Njegos dynasty.

The newspaper began its publication on 3 September 1906. Among the founders and owners of the "Narodna misao" were politicians Andrija Radović and Marko Radulović, both formerly Prime Ministers of Montenegro. The newspaper was abolished in November 1907, with the intervention of the new Royalist True People's Party-led government.
