= President of the Parliament of Montenegro =

Presiding officer of the Parliament of Montenegro

President of Parliament
- Predsjednik Skupštine; Предсједник Скупштине
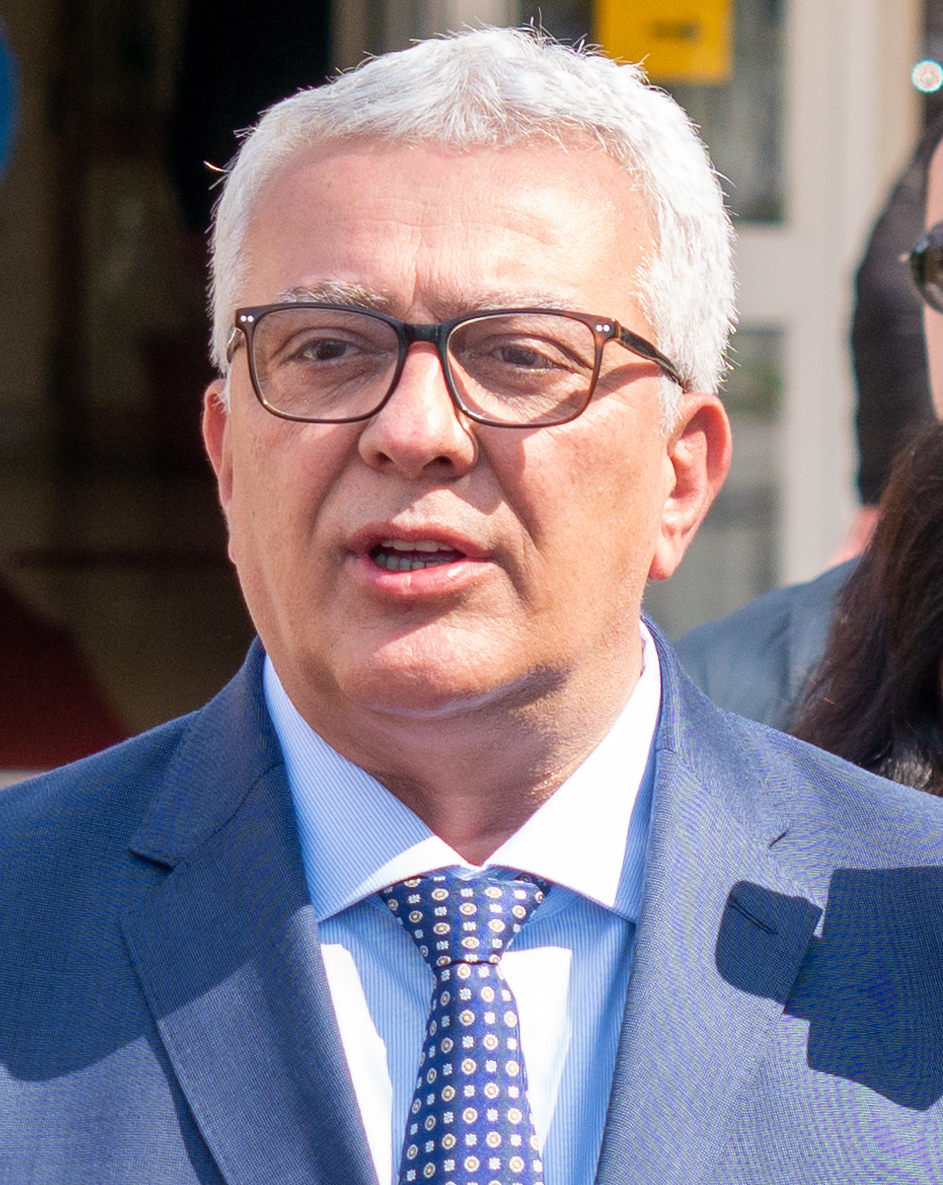
- Incumbent; Andrija Mandić since 30 October 2023
- Style: Mister/Madam President (informal); His/Her Excellency (diplomatic)
- Type: Speaker
- Nominator: Political parties
- Appointer: Parliament of Montenegro
- Term length: Four years
- Inaugural holder: Šako Petrović-Njegoš
- Formation: 27 November 1906; 119 years ago

The president of the Parliament of Montenegro (Montenegrin: Предсједник Скупштине Црне Горе, romanized: Predsjednik Skupštine Crne Gore) is the presiding officer of the Parliament of Montenegro. The president's term lasts four years, and is elected by members of each new assembly.

The president of the Parliament serves as the acting president of Montenegro if the elected president vacates the office before the expiration of its five-year term due to death, resignation or removal.

== List of presidents ==
=== Monarchy ===
Name	Party	Term of office	
Heads of the Senate of Montenegro and the Highlands
Ivan Vukotić	None	2 September 1831	January 1834
Pero Petrović	None	3 September 1837	1 December 1853
Đorđije Petrović	None	1 December 1853	18 February 1857
Mirko Petrović	None	18 February 1857	20 July 1867
Božo Petrović	None	20 July 1867	20 March 1879
Presidents of the National Assembly of Montenegro
Šako Petrović	NS	27 November 1906	9 July 1907
Labud Gojnić	PNS	27 November 1907	14 December 1908
Marko Đukanović	PNS	14 December 1908	1 December 1910
Milo Dožić	None	1 December 1910	12 February 1911
Jovan Plamenac	PNS	1 December 1911	25 October 1913
Milo Dožić	None	28 January 1914	4 January 1916

=== Republic ===
No.	Name (Birth–Death)	Term of office		Party
President of the Montenegrin Anti-Fascist Assembly of National Liberation
1	Niko Miljanić (1892–1957)	15 November 1943	13 July 1944	Unitary National Liberation Front
Presidents of the Presidency of the People's Assembly
(1)	Niko Miljanić (1892–1957)	13 July 1944	21 November 1946	People's Front
2	Miloš Rašović (1893–1988)	21 November 1946	6 November 1950	Communist Party
3	Nikola Kovačević (1890–1964)	6 November 1950	15 December 1953	Communist Party
Presidents of the People's Assembly of Montenegro
4	Blažo Jovanović (1907–1976)	15 December 1953	12 July 1962	League of Communists
5	Filip Bajković (1910–1985)	12 July 1962	5 May 1963	League of Communists
6	Andrija Mugoša (1912–2006)	5 May 1963	5 May 1967	League of Communists
7	Veljko Milatović (1921–2004)	5 May 1967	6 October 1969	League of Communists
8	Vidoje Žarković (1927–2000)	6 October 1969	1 April 1974	League of Communists
9	Budislav Šoškić (1925–1979)	1 April 1974	5 April 1974	League of Communists
(9)	Budislav Šoškić (1925–1979)	5 April 1974	12 August 1979	League of Communists
10	Radivoje Brajović (born 1935)	August 1979	April 1982	League of Communists
11	Milutin Tanjević (1927–2011)	April 1982	May 1983	League of Communists
12	Omer Kurpejović (1929–2013)	May 1983	May 1984	League of Communists
13	Čedomir Đuranović (1932–2012)	May 1984	May 1985	League of Communists
14	Marko Matković (1932–2016)	May 1985	June 1986	League of Communists
15	Velisav Vuksanović (died 2011)	June 1986	March 1989	League of Communists
16	Dragan Radonjić (born 1955)	March 1989	December 1990	League of Communists
17	Risto Vukčević (1929–1994)	23 December 1990	28 April 1992	League of Communists
Presidents of the Parliament of Montenegro
1 (17)	Risto Vukčević (1929–1994)	28 April 1992	12 December 1994	Democratic Party of Socialists
2 (18)	Svetozar Marović (born 1955)	12 December 1994	7 June 2001	Democratic Party of Socialists
3 (19)	Vesna Perović (born 1954)	7 June 2001	5 November 2002	Liberal Alliance of Montenegro
4 (20)	Filip Vujanović (born 1954)	5 November 2002	30 July 2003	Democratic Party of Socialists
5 (21)	Ranko Krivokapić (born 1961)	30 July 2003	19 May 2016	Social Democratic Party
6 (22)	Darko Pajović (born 1972)	1 June 2016	7 November 2016	Positive Montenegro
7 (23)	Ivan Brajović (born 1962)	24 November 2016	23 September 2020	Social Democrats
8 (24)	Aleksa Bečić (born 1987)	23 September 2020	7 February 2022	Democratic Montenegro
9 (25)	Danijela Đurović (born 1973)	28 April 2022	30 October 2023	Socialist People's Party
10 (26)	Andrija Mandić (born 1965)	30 October 2023	Incumbent	New Serb Democracy

Interim chairpersons
Since 2002, in case of need the eldest deputy opens and leads the first session when a new Montenegrin parliament is formed, until a speaker is elected (E.g. 2020). The same procedure is in the case of the sudden cessation of the term of the previously elected president, the oldest MP chair parliamentary sessions, until the election of a new speaker. (E.g. in 2003 and 2016)

Name (Birth–Death)	Term of office		Political party
Dragan Kujović (1948–2010)	30 July 2003		Democratic Party of Socialists
Milutin Simović (born 1961)	19 May 2016	1 June 2016	Democratic Party of Socialists
Marija Ćatović (born 1947)	7 November 2016	24 November 2016	Democratic Party of Socialists
Miodrag Lekić (born 1947)	23 September 2020		Democratic Alliance
Strahinja Bulajić (born 1960)	7 February 2022	20 April 2022	Democratic Front
