= Villa "Gorica" =

Villa "Gorica" (Montenegrin: Vila "Gorica" / Вила "Горица") is a villa located on the southern slopes of Gorica hill in Podgorica, Montenegro.

The villa is used by the Government of Montenegro for representative purposes, for hosting official meetings, talks with delegations from the country and abroad, holding ceremonies marking the state's anniversaries, the state awards', medals' and other awarding ceremonies, and similar festive receptions.

Villa "Gorica" was projected by M. Prljević, and was named after the hill on which it was built. It is an example of early modern architecture. It is a three-storey building, with a total space of 1,850 square meters.

== History ==
The villa was built in the 1950s, as a residency of the Montenegrin national hero, the first Prime Minister and President of the People's Assembly of Montenegro, Blažo Jovanović, and his family. For this reason, it used to be called Blažo's villa by the local people.

Several years later, the Jovanović family moved to a new residence near the villa – the future site of the Montenegrin Academy of Sciences and Arts – and Villa "Gorica" became state property.
