= Mihailo Ivanović (politician) =

Montenegrin politician (1874–1949)

- Михаило Ивановић
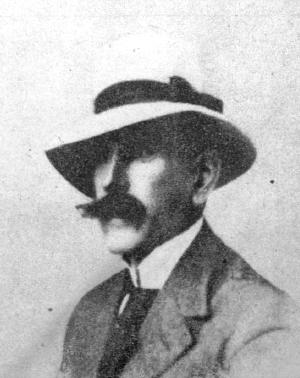
- Mihailo Ivanović

4th Minister of Interior of Principality of Montenegro
- In office 24 November 1906 – 17 April 1907
- Monarch: Nicholas I
- Prime Minister: Marko Radulović; Andrija Radović
- Preceded by: Labud Gojnić
- Succeeded by: Lakić Vojvodić

5th Vice president of the Popular Assembly of Kingdom of Montenegro
- In office 27 April 1914 – 12 December 1915
- Monarch: Nicholas I
- President of the Popular Assembly: Milo Dožić
- Preceded by: Gavrilo Cerović
- Succeeded by: Petar Plamenac

Leader of the People's Party
- In office 1905–1919 Serving with Andrija Radović and Marko Radulović

Leader of the Montenegrin Federalist Party
- In office 1923–1945 Serving with Krsto Popović and Sekula Drljević

Personal details
- Born: 1874 Kuči, Principality of Montenegro
- Died: 1949 (aged 74–75) Herceg Novi, PR Montenegro, FPR Yugoslavia
- Citizenship: Montenegro

Mihailo Ivanović (Serbian Cyrillic: Михаило Ивановић; Kuči 1874 – Herceg Novi 1949) was a Montenegrin politician in the early 20th century. He was one of the leaders of the People's Party (known as klubaši) from 1906 to 1918. After unification, he was disappointed and had become an important leader of the Montenegrin Federalist Party in the assembly of the Kingdom of Serbs, Croats and Slovenes, and an Axis power collaborator.

== Biography ==
During his studies in Belgrade in 1899 he was deported from Serbia with a group of Montenegrins on the grounds that they had prepared a terrorist act. He graduated from the Faculty of Law at the University of Zagreb and returned to Montenegro where he worked in the court in Nikšić. Later he became a member of the High Court in the Kingdom of Montenegro.

Ivanović became a believer in Montenegrin unity with Serbia and in 1912 moved to Belgrade. He stayed there until king Nicholas I amnestied him and he returned once more to Montenegro. After the Podgorica Assembly he became a member of the Montenegrin Federalist Party. He was elected to the National Assembly in 1923, 1925, and 1927.

With the establishment of "an independent Montenegro" during World War II under the patronage of Fascist Italy, he participated in the St. Peter's Day Parliament which was to announce a new Montenegrin government. After the war, he lost his citizen's rights under the communist regime for having collaborated with the Italians.
