= Marko Radulović =

Marko Radulović may refer to:

- Marko Radulović (water polo) (born 2001), Serbian water polo player
- Marko Radulović (politician) (1866–1932), Montenegrin politician
