= Narodna stranka =

Narodna stranka (English: People's Party) may refer to:

- People's Party (Kingdom of Croatia), 1841–1918
- People's Party (Dalmatia), 1861–1905
- Croatian-Slovene People's Party, 1884–1926
- Croatian People's Party – Liberal Democrats, 1990
- People's Party (Montenegro, 1906)
- People's Party (Montenegro, 1990)
- People's Party (1990), a defunct political party in Serbia
- People's Party (2017), a political party in Serbia
