= Executive Bureau of the Presidency of the 9th Congress of the League of Communists of Yugoslavia =

9th Executive Bureau
- Emblem of the League of Communists of Yugoslavia

15 March 1969 – 30 May 1974 (5 years, 76 days) Overview
- Type: Political organ
- Election: 9th Congress

Members
- Total: 16 members
- Newcomers: 16 members (9th)
- Reelected: Organ abolished
- By-elected: 1 members (2nd Conf.)

This electoral term of the Executive Bureau of the Presidency was elected by the 9th Congress of the League of Communists of Yugoslavia in 1969, and was in session until the gathering of the 10th Congress in 1974.

== Composition ==
=== 9th Congress: 1969–1972 ===
Members of the Executive Bureau of the Presidency of the 9th Congress of the League of Communists of Yugoslavia
Name	2nd CON	Birth	PM	Death	Branch	Nationality	Gender	Ref.
Josip Broz Tito	Renewed	1892	1918	1980	Not made public	Croat	Male	
Vladimir Bakarić	Not	1912	1933	1983	Croatia	Croat	Male	
Krste Crvenkovski	Not	1921	1939	2001	Macedonia	Macedonian	Male	
Nijaz Dizdarević	Not	1920	1942	1989	Bosnia-Herzegovina	Muslim	Male	
Stane Dolanc	Renewed	1925	1944	1999	Slovenia	Slovene	Male	
Stevan Doronjski	Renewed	1919	1939	1981	Vojvodina	Serb	Male	
Kiro Gligorov	Renewed	1917	1943	2012	Macedonia	Macedonian	Male	
Fadilj Hodža	Renewed	1916	1941	2001	Kosovo	Albanian	Male	
Edvard Kardelj	Not	1910	1928	1979	Slovenia	Slovene	Male	
Cvijetin Mijatović	Not	1913	1934	1993	Bosnia-Herzegovina	Serb	Male	
Miroslav Pečujlić	Not	1929	1944	2006	Serbia	Croat	Male	
Budislav Šoškić	Renewed	1925	1942	1979	Montenegro	Serb	Male	
Mijalko Todorović	Renewed	1913	1938	1999	Serbia	Serb	Male	
Mika Tripalo	Not	1926	1943	1995	Croatia	Croat	Male	
Veljko Vlahović	Not	1914	1935	1975	Montenegro	Montenegrin	Male	

=== 2nd Conference: 1972–1974 ===
Members of the Executive Bureau of the Presidency of the 2nd Conference of the 9th Congress of the League of Communists of Yugoslavia
Name	Birth	PM	Death	Branch	Nationality	Gender	Ref.
Josip Broz Tito	1892	1918	1980	Not made public	Croat	Male	
Krsta Avramović	1928	1946	2013	Serbia	Serb	Male	
Jure Bilić	1922	1941	2006	Croatia	Croat	Male	
Stane Dolanc	1925	1944	1999	Slovenia	Slovene	Male	
Stevan Doronjski	1919	1939	1981	Vojvodina	Serb	Male	
Kiro Gligorov	1917	1943	2012	Macedonia	Macedonian	Male	
Fadilj Hodža	1916	1941	2001	Kosovo	Albanian	Male	
Todo Kurtović	1919	1941	1997	Bosnia-Herzegovina	Serb	Male	
Budislav Šoškić	1925	1942	1979	Montenegro	Serb	Male	

== Bibliography ==
=== Books ===
- Rajović, Radošin, ed. (1970). Jugoslovenski savremenici: Ko je ko u Jugoslaviji [Yugoslav Contemporaries: Who's Who in Yugoslavia] (in Serbo-Croatian). Hronometar.
- Lewytzkyj, Borys; Stroynowski, Juliusz, eds. (1978). Who's Who in the Socialist Countries. K. G. Saur Verlag. ISBN 3-7940-3017-6.
- Staff writer, ed. (1965). VIII Kongres Saveza Komunista Jugoslavije: Beograd, 7-13. decembra 1964.: stenog̈rafske beleške [VIII Congress of the League of Communists of Yugoslavia: Belgrade, 7-13. December 1964: shorthand notes] (in Serbo-Croatian). Vol. 3. Central Committee of the League of Communists of Yugoslavia.
- Staff writer, ed. (1966). Svjetski almanah [World Almanac] (in Serbo-Croatian). Vol. 4. Novinsko izdavačko poduzeće.
- Staff writer, ed. (1969). Peti kongres Saveza komunista Bosne i Hercegovine: Sarajevo, 9-11. januara 1969. Knjigu pripremili: Pozderac Hamdija [i dr.] [Fifth Congress of the Union of Communists of Bosnia and Herzegovina: Sarajevo, 9-11. January 1969. The book was prepared by: Pozderac Hamdija [and others].] (in Serbo-Croatian). Central Committee of the League of Communists of Bosnia and Herzegovina.
- Staff writer, ed. (1970a). Deveti kongres Saveza komunista Jugoslavije, Beograd, 11-13. III.1969 Stenografske beleške [Ninth Congress of the League of Communists of Yugoslavia, Belgrade, 11-13. III.1969 Stenographic notes] (in Serbo-Croatian). Vol. 2. Central Committee of the League of Communists of Yugoslavia.
- Staff writer, ed. (1970b). Konferencija Saveza komunista Jugoslavije, održana od 29. do 31. oktobra 1970 [Conference of the League of Communists of Yugoslavia, held from October 29 to 31, 1970] (in Serbo-Croatian). Vol. 1–3. Central Committee of the League of Communists of Yugoslavia.
- Stroynowski, Juliusz, ed. (1989a). Who's Who in the Socialist Countries of Europe: A–H. K. G. Saur Verlag. ISBN 3-598-10719-6.
- Stroynowski, Juliusz, ed. (1989b). Who's Who in the Socialist Countries of Europe: I–O. K. G. Saur Verlag. ISBN 3-598-10719-6.
- Stroynowski, Juliusz, ed. (1989c). Who's Who in the Socialist Countries of Europe: P–Z. K. G. Saur Verlag. ISBN 3-598-10719-6.
- Zalar, Charles, ed. (1961). Yugoslav Communism: A Critical Study. United States Government Printing Office. Archived from the original on 11 June 2023.

=== Journals ===
- Spasenovski, Aleksandar (December 2019). "The Transformation of the Macedonian Party System: From Monism Towards Pluralism". Political Thought. 17 (58). Konrad Adenauer Foundation and the Institute for Democracy Societas Civilis: 19–38. Archived from the original on 11 June 2023.
