= Miljan Radović (politician) =

Montenegrin communist politician

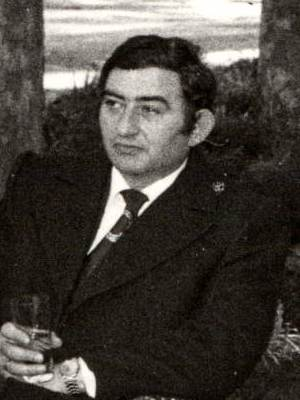

President of the Presidency of the Central Committee of the League of Communists of Montenegro
- In office May 1986 – 11 January 1989
- Preceded by: Marko Orlandić
- Succeeded by: Milica Pejanović

Personal details
- Born: 25 September 1933 Žirci, Kingdom of Yugoslavia
- Died: 15 June 2015 (aged 82) Belgrade, Serbia
- Party: League of Communists

Miljan Radović (Serbo-Croatian Cyrillic: Миљан Радовић; 25 September 1933 – 15 June 2015) was a Yugoslav communist politician who served as President of the Presidency of the Central Committee of the League of Communists of Montenegro (SKCG) from 1986 to 1989. Radović resigned, along with numerous other SKCG officials, in the wake of the 1988–1989 anti-bureaucratic revolution.

== See also ==
- League of Communists of Montenegro
  - President of the League of Communists of Montenegro
