= Ministry of Defence (Montenegro) =

Government ministry of Montenegro

Ministry of Defence of Montenegro
- Министарство одбране Црне Горе; Ministarstvo odbrane Crne Gore
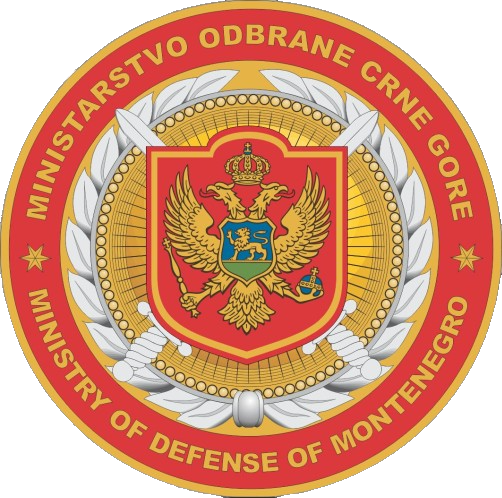

Agency overview
- Jurisdiction: Government of Montenegro
- Headquarters: Podgorica
- Agency executive: Dragan Krapović, Minister of Defence of Montenegro
- Website: www.vojska.me

The Ministry of Defence of Montenegro (Montenegrin: Министарство одбране Црне Горе / Ministarstvo odbrane Crne Gore, МОЦГ, MOCG) is the ministry in the Government of Montenegro that is in charge of the nation's military.

== List of ministers ==
No.	Portrait	Name (born–died)	Term of office			Political party	Government(s)	Ref.
No.	Portrait	Name (born–died)	Took office	Left office	Time in office	Political party	Government(s)	Ref.
Ministers of War of the Principality and Kingdom of Montenegro
1		Ilija Plamenac (1821–1916)	20 March 1879	19 December 1905	26 years, 274 days	Independent	Petrović-Njegoš	
2		Janko Vukotić (1866–1927)	19 December 1905	24 November 1906	340 days	Independent	Mijušković I	
3		Danilo Gatalo (1866–1935)	24 November 1906	1 February 1907	69 days	Independent	Radulović	
4		Andrija Radović (1872–1947)	1 February 1907	17 April 1907	75 days	NS	Radović I	
5		Mitar Martinović (1870–1954)	17 April 1907	14 September 1910	3 years, 150 days	PNS	Tomanović I–II	
6		Ivo Đurović (1862–1918)	14 September 1910	1 August 1911	321 days	PNS	Tomanović III	
–		Marko Đukanović (1860–1930) acting	1 August 1911	23 August 1911	22 days	PNS	Tomanović III	
(2)		Janko Vukotić (1866–1927)	23 August 1911	19 June 1912	301 days	Independent	Tomanović IV	
(5)		Mitar Martinović (1870–1954)	19 June 1912	8 May 1913	323 days	PNS	Martinović	
(2)		Janko Vukotić (1866–1927)	8 May 1913	16 July 1915	2 years, 69 days	Independent	Vukotić I–II	
7		Mašan Božović (1858–1920)	16 July 1915	2 January 1916	170 days	Independent	Vukotić II–III; Mijušković II	
Ministers of War of the Kingdom of Montenegro in exile
		Radomir Vešović (1871–1938)	2 January 1916	12 May 1916	131 days	Independent	Mijušković II	
		Milo Matanović (1879–1955)	12 May 1916	11 June 1917	250 days	Independent	Radović II; Matanović	
		Niko Hajduković (1882–1954)	12 May 1916	2 March 1919	2 years, 294 days	Independent	Matanović; Popović	
		Milutin Vučinić (1869–1922)	2 March 1919	14 September 1922	3 years, 196 days	PNS	Plamenac I–II–III; Vučinić	
		Đuro Jovović (1872–1929)	23 September 1922	10 August 1929	6 years, 321 days	Independent	Gvozdenović	
Part of Ministry of Defence of Yugoslavia (1918–1991)
8		Božidar Babić (1938–)	15 February 1991	5 March 1993	2 years, 18 days	Independent	Đukanović I	
Part of Ministry of Defence of FR Yugoslavia (1993–2006)
9		Milo Đukanović (1962–)	21 May 2006	10 November 2006	173 days	DPS	Đukanović IV	
10		Boro Vučinić (1954–)	10 November 2006	4 December 2012	6 years, 24 days	DPS	Šturanović; Đukanović V–VI; Lukšić	
11		Milica Pejanović (1959–)	4 December 2012	28 November 2016	3 years, 360 days	DPS	Đukanović VII	
12		Predrag Bošković (1972–)	28 November 2016	4 December 2020	4 years, 6 days	DPS	Marković	
13		Olivera Injac (1972–)	4 December 2020	28 April 2022	1 year, 145 days	Independent	Krivokapić	
14		Raško Konjević (1979–)	28 April 2022	21 October 2022	176 days	SDP	Abazović	
15		Filip Adžić (1986–)	21 October 2022	31 October 2023	4 years, 1 day	URA	Spajić	
16		Dragan Krapović	31 October 2023	Incumbent	2 years, 356 days	DCG	Spajić	
