= Ministry of Education, Science, Culture and Sports =

Ministry of Education, Science, Culture and Sports may refer to:

- Ministry of Education, Science, Culture and Sports (Montenegro)
- Ministry of Education, Science, Culture and Sports (Armenia)
- Ministry of Education, Science, Culture and Sport of Georgia
