= Budislav Šoškić =

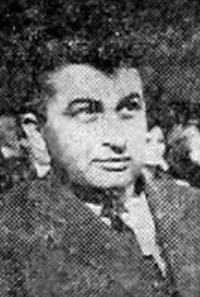
Šoškić in 1968

Budislav Šoškić (1925–1979) was a politician from Socialist Republic of Montenegro and member of League of Communists of Yugoslavia.

== Biography ==
Šoškić was born in Novi Pazar and had studied at the University of Belgrade. He was the last President of the People's Assembly of the Socialist Republic of Montenegro who also was head of state. After him, on 5 April 1974, his post as head of state was transformed in "President of the Presidency". He remained speaker of the assembly from 1974 to 1979.

== See also ==
- President of the Parliament of Montenegro

Preceded by Vidoje Žarković	President of the People's Assembly of Montenegro; 1 April 1974–5 April 1974	Succeeded by Veljko Milatović (as President of the Presidency of Montenegro)
