= Filip Bajković =

- Филип Бајковић
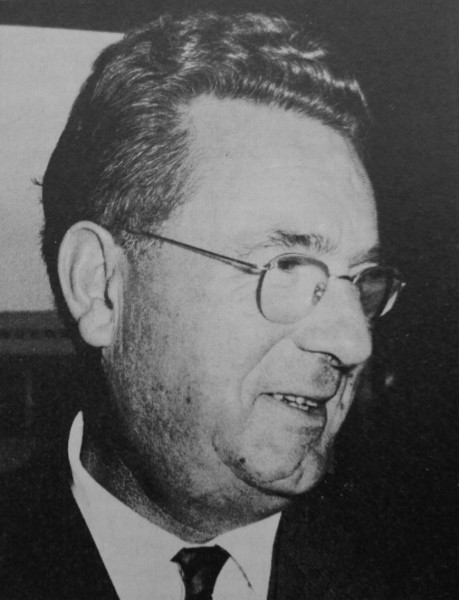
- Bajković in 1968

2nd Prime Minister of Montenegro
- In office 16 December 1953 – 12 July 1962
- Preceded by: Blažo Jovanović
- Succeeded by: Đorđije Pajković

Personal details
- Born: 20 May 1910 Cairo, Khedivate of Egypt
- Died: 15 February 1985 (aged 74) Belgrade, SR Serbia
- Party: Communist Party of Yugoslavia

Filip Bajković (20 May 1910 – 15 February 1985) was the President of the Executive Council of Montenegro from 16 December 1951 to 12 July 1962. From 12 July 1962 to 5 May 1963, he was the President of the People's Assembly of Montenegro.

== Biography ==
He was born on 20 May 1910, in Cairo, Egypt, where his father served as a Montenegrin diplomat. Soon he and his family came back to the Kingdom of Montenegro, and as citizens of Cetinje, his father's native town, Filip finished elementary school. Then he enrolled in high school, graduating in 1929/1930 in Cetinje. By nationality a Montenegrin of peasant social background, he spent his childhood in very difficult circumstances, separated from his father, who returned to Cairo after participating as a volunteer in the First Balkan War. In 1922, Filip's father died in Cairo. As a high school student, especially in the older gymnasium classes, Filip actively participated in the work of the literary family "Skerlić", and engaged in cultural, artistic, and sporting activities.

In the autumn of 1930, he enrolled at the Faculty of Law at the University of Belgrade. A few months later, due to difficult material circumstances, he was employed in the administration of the magazine Misao, where he worked for several years and took exams at the Law Faculty. Arriving in Belgrade he approached the advanced student youth and joined the Yugoslav socialist movement. In 1932, he was admitted to the membership of the Communist Party of Yugoslavia (CPY). Two years later, he was sent to party work at Karaburma where he formed a party organization in the textile factory "Vlade Ilić" and was elected secretary of the sports club "Belgrade".

In 1935, during the break-up of a party organization in the country, the Karaburma organization was also discovered, and Filip Bajković was arrested and sentenced to one year of strict imprisonment, which he spent in Sremska Mitrovica and Niš. Upon leaving the prison, he was sent to serve military service, when he passed two residual exams at the Faculty of Law, from 1938 until April 1941. In the year 1939, he worked as a lawyer trainee in Belgrade. He was arrested again for his communist activity.

After the Fascist attack on Yugoslavia in April 1941, he was in Belgrade at the time of the capitulation of the Yugoslav army in Montenegro. As a member of the Local Committee of the Communist Party in Bar, he participated in preparations for the uprising, as well as in the uprising in the town of Bar. In September 1941, he was elected a member of the Municipal Committee of the CPY of Cetinje, and a month later as a member of the Bureau of the District Committee of the CPY of Cetinje. In February 1942, he became Secretary of the National Liberation Committee for the District of Cetinje, and two months later deputy political commissar of the Lovcen Partisan Detachment. He remained in office until the formation of the Fourth Montenegrin Proletarian Brigade in which he assumed the post of Deputy Political Commissioner of the 5th Battalion.

At the end of 1942, he was transferred to the First Proletarian Brigade for the head of the Politodel Brigade and in the second half of 1943. He was appointed as instructor of the Central Committee of the CPY for party schools in units and on the terrain of Dalmatia and Bosnia. In the middle of 1944. He joined the United Nations office in Yugoslavia for the year. Later on, while fighting for the liberation of Belgrade took place, he participated in the organization of the UN for Vojvodina.

After the liberation, he continued to work in the UN and Yugoslavia. In 1948, he received the rank of general and later he became Assistant Minister of Personnel Affairs in April 1951. In the meantime, he was transferred to Montenegro where until 1963, he performed the following duties: Chairman of the Chamber of Commerce; Deputy Prime Minister of Montenegro; President of the Executive Council of the People's Republic of Montenegro from 16 December 1953 until 12 July 1962; and President of the National Assembly of the People's Republic of Montenegro from 12 July 1962 to 5 May 1963. All these positions were decreed by Josip Broz Tito who was the dictator of the country and its lifetime president.

In the same period, starting in 1953, he was a member of the Parliament of Montenegro and the Federal People's Assembly and a member of the Presidency of the Central Committee of the League of Communists of Montenegro.

From 1963, he held office in Belgrade: Federal Secretary for Industry; Member of the Federal Executive Council; Vice President of the Federal Assembly; and Member of the Federation Council from 1970.

He died on 15 February 1985 in Belgrade. He was buried on 17 February in a cemetery near Cetinje.

== Decorations and awards ==
He was a recipient of the Partisan Medal in 1941, and other foreign and Yugoslav awards, including the Order of National Liberation, Order of the Yugoslav flag, and others. He was also decorated with the Order of the People's Hero on 27 November 1953.

Preceded by Blažo Jovanović	President of the Executive Council of Montenegro; 16 December 1951–12 July 1962	Succeeded by Đorđije Pajković
Preceded by Blažo Jovanović	President of the People's Assembly of Montenegro; 12 July 1962–5 May 1963	Succeeded by Andrija Mugoša
