= Božo Petrović-Njegoš =

Montenegrin vojvoda and politician

vojvoda Božo Petrović-Njegoš
- Божо Петровић-Његош
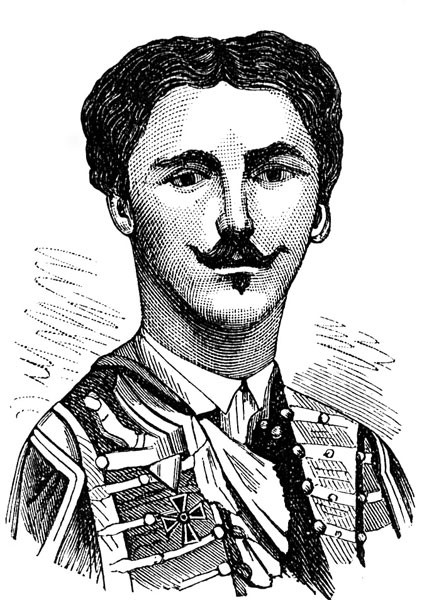
- Božo Petrović-Njegoš in 1877

1st Prime Minister of Principality of Montenegro President of the Council of State of Montenegro
- In office 20 March 1879 – 19 December 1905
- Monarch: Nicholas I
- Preceded by: Position established
- Succeeded by: Lazar Mijušković

4th Head of the Governing Senate of Montenegro and the Highlands
- In office 20 July 1867 – 20 March 1879
- Monarch: Nicholas I
- Preceded by: Mirko Petrović-Njegoš
- Succeeded by: Position abolished

2nd Minister of Internal Affairs of Principality of Montenegro
- In office 1884 – 19 December 1905
- Monarch: Nicholas I
- Prime Minister: Himself
- Preceded by: Mašo Vrbica
- Succeeded by: Swan Gojnić

1st and 5th Minister of Justice of Principality of Montenegro
- In office 20 March 1879 – 1893
- Monarch: Nicholas I
- Prime Minister: Himself
- Preceded by: Position established
- Succeeded by: Valtazar Bogišić
- In office 1 October 1904 – 19 December 1905
- Monarch: Nicholas I
- Prime Minister: Himself
- Preceded by: Miloš Đ. Shaulić
- Succeeded by: Milo Dožić

Governor of Shkodër and Malësia
- In office 27 June 1915 – 23 January 1916
- Monarch: Nicholas I
- Prime Minister: Janko Vukotić; Lazar Mijušković
- Minister of War: Janko Vukotić; Mašan Božović; Radomir Vešović

Personal details
- Born: 1846
- Died: 1929 (aged 82–83)

Božo Petrović-Njegoš (Serbian Cyrillic: Божо Петровић-Његош; 1846−1929) was a Montenegrin vojvoda and politician. He served as head of government of Montenegro from 1879 to 1905.

After taking command of the Southern Army in the Montenegrin–Ottoman War of 1876–1878, he represented the Principality of Montenegro at the Congress of Berlin.

== Early life and ancestry ==
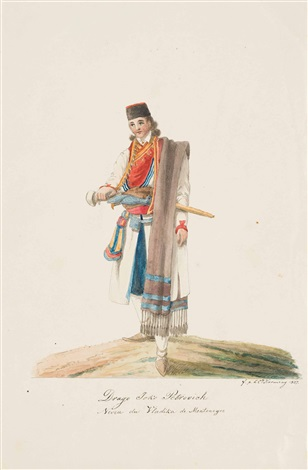
Božo's father: Drago Petrović-Njegoš (1818-1872) wearing Montenegrin national costume, painted in 1837 by the Austro-Hungarian cartographer, adventurer and artist Fedor von Karacsay (1787-1859).

He was the eldest son of Drago Petrović-Njegoš (1818-1872), nephew of Petar II Petrović-Njegoš and member of the younger branch of the Petrović-Njegoš dynasty and his wife, Marija Mare Daković, the daughter of Jakov Daković and sister of Anto Daković, who both held the title Grand Duke of Grahovo. Božo was sent to study in Paris, but he returned to Montenegro afterwards. As cousin of Prince Nikola, Božo served as heir apparent from 1860 until 1871, when Nikola's first son Danilo was born.

== Career ==
Božo was commander of the Southern Army during the Montenegrin–Ottoman War of 1876–1878. He had great success in the Battles of Medun and Trijebač. However, in his memoirs, vojvoda Ilija Plamenac later claimed he was de facto leader of the Southern Army, as Božo was too young and inexperienced. After the war, Božo was the Montenegrin delegate the Congress of Berlin. He was also one of the candidates for Prince of Bulgaria in 1879.

After the Congress, Božo served as Montenegrin head of government for over 25 years. He was first President of the Senate, and after that as President of the Council of State from 1879 to 1905. Božo was also the first President of the Montenegrin Great Court after its establishment in 1879, serving there until 1882. He retired from politics with the proclamation of the liberal 1905 Constitution of Montenegro. In 1915, he was made governor of Shkodër and Malësia following their occupation in World War I.

Božo was jailed in December 1918 during the events that led to the creation of Yugoslavia. He was arrested near Nikšić with his two younger brothers, General Đuro Petrović-Njegoš (b. 1851) and former district councilor Marko Petrović-Njegoš (b. 1854), once an intended groom for his cousin, Princess Olga of Montenegro, an only child of Danilo I, Prince of Montenegro. All three were interned in Podgorica. Božo and Marko were released after almost one year, and were later interned in Sarajevo. General Đuro was kept in Podgorica where he suffered from cataracts.

== Death ==
He died in 1929 and is buried in the graveyard of the Church of Saint Sava in Erakovići, near Cetinje.

Political offices
Preceded by Himself as President of the Governing Senate of Montenegro and the Highlands	President of the Council of State of Montenegro; 20 March 1879 – 19 December 1905	Succeeded by Lazar Mijušković as President of the Ministerial Council of Montenegro
