= Šako Petrović-Njegoš =

Montenegrin theologian, military commander and politician

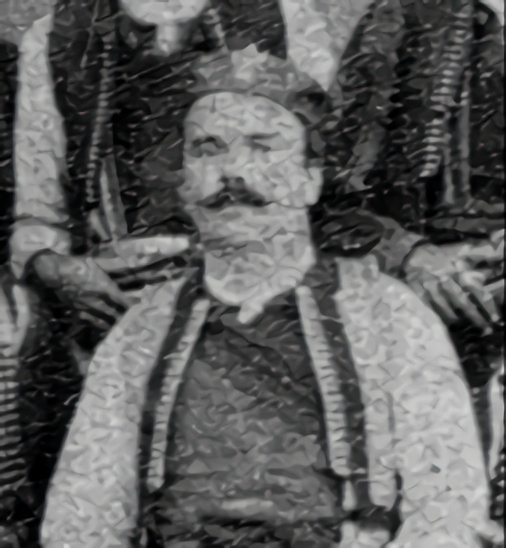
Vojvoda Šako Petrović, during the Herzegovina uprising of 1875–77.

Šako Petrović-Njegoš (Serbian Cyrillic: Шако Петровић-Његош; 1854–1914) was a Montenegrin theologian, military commander, politician and cousin of Montenegrin King Nikola I.

== Biography ==
Šako Petrović-Njegoš was the first president of the National Assembly in the Principality of Montenegro (from November 1906 until 9 July 1907), a state advisor and the founder of the People's Party in 1906, a party that a few years later played a key role in the dethroning of the Petrović-Njegoš dynasty. People's Party was the first political party in Montenegro.
