= Mašan Božović =

- Машан Божовић
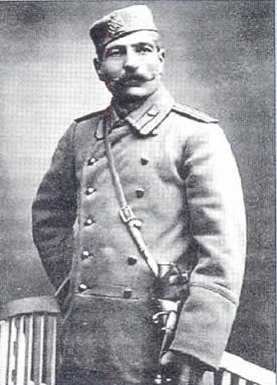

7th Minister of War of Kingdom of Montenegro
- In office 16 July 1915 – 2 January 1916
- Monarch: Nicholas I
- Prime Minister: Janko Vukotić
- Preceded by: Janko Vukotić
- Succeeded by: Radomir Vešović

2nd Mayor of Cetinje
- In office 1899–1904
- Preceded by: Božo Novaković
- Succeeded by: Savo Vuletić

Personal details
- Born: 4 March 1858 Stijena, Principality of Montenegro
- Died: 25 September 1920 (aged 61) Podgorica, Kingdom of Serbs, Croats and Slovenes
- Other political affiliations: Independent
- Occupation: Military officer
- Awards: Medal of Courage

Military service
- Allegiance: Montenegro
- Branch/service: Montenegro Army
- Years of service: 1877–1920
- Rank: Serdar
- Battles/wars: Montenegrin–Ottoman War (1876–1878); WW1

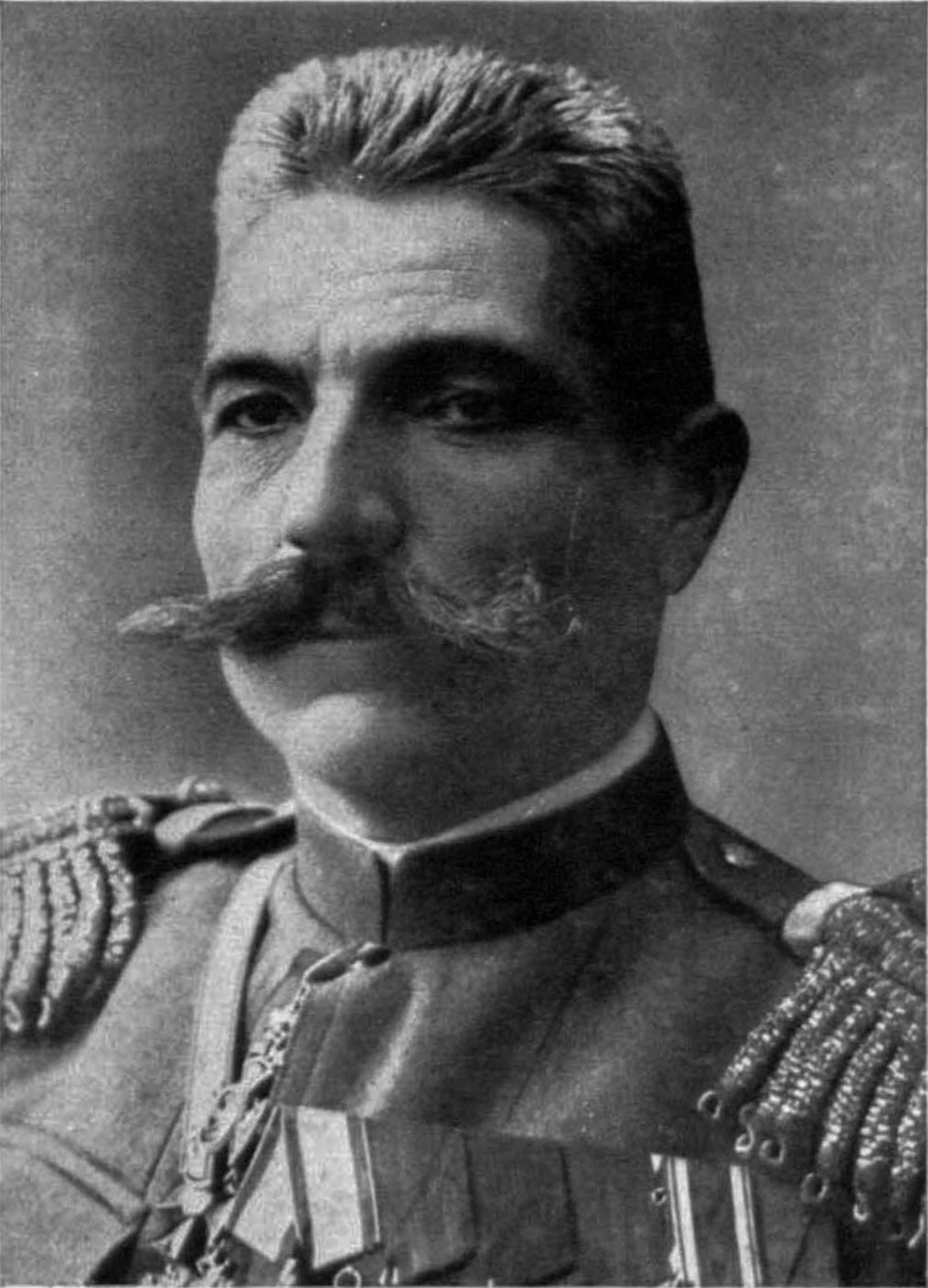

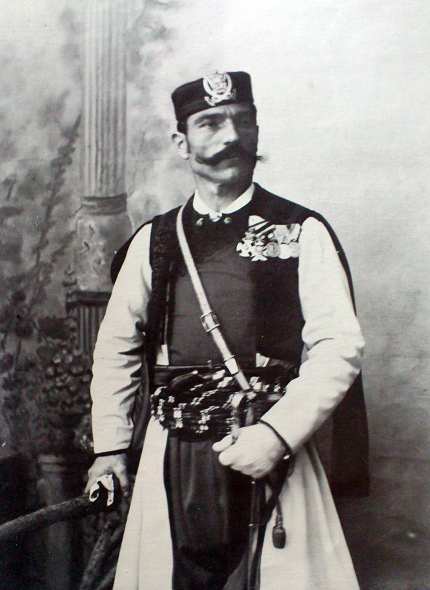
Božović as leader of the Montenegrin gendarmerie in Crete

Mašan Božović (Serbian Cyrillic: Машан Божовић), was a Montenegrin military officer, Minister of War of the Kingdom of Montenegro, President of the Municipality of Cetinje, Serdar, born in Piperi.

== Biography ==
He volunteered in the Montenegrin-Ottoman War of 1876–1878. He was a first-generation cadet of the Italian Military Academy from 1882 to 1886. He was President of the Municipality of Cetinje from 1899 to 1904. He participated in the leadership of the Montenegrin detachment in Crete, where troops were stationed on the island as part of international peacekeeping. He was reactivated in 1910. He was commander of the Prekotar detachment in 1912–1913, one of the Bobov detachments in Sandić, and commander of the Second Division of the Sandžak Army during World War I. He was appointed Serdar in 1915, when he served as Minister of War from 16 July 1915 to 2 January 1916. On December 5, 1915, he was awarded the title of serdar of Piperi for his successful command in the war. From 1915 he was the commander of the Old Serbian detachment. From 1916 to 1918 he was in a camp in Hungary. After unification, as a colonel in the Yugoslav Army, he served as a regimental commander and local commander in Podgorica. He was awarded the Medal of Courage.

== Literature ==
- Narodna rije, Cetinje, September 29, 1920
- Montenegrin Almanac, Subotica 1929
- Military Encyclopedia 1, Belgrade 1970
- Text by Rista Dragičević, JLZ Zagreb, Scientific Advisor to the Historical Institute of the Yugoslav Encyclopedia 1982
