= Blažo Jovanović =

Montenegrin politician and revolutionary army commander

- Блажо Јовановић
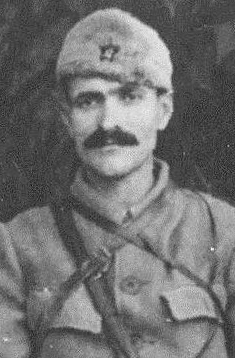
- Jovanović in 1942

Prime Minister of Montenegro
- In office 17 April 1945 – 4 February 1953
- Preceded by: Milovan Đilas
- Succeeded by: Filip Bajković

President of the People's Assembly
- In office 15 December 1953 – 12 July 1962
- Preceded by: Nikola Kovačević
- Succeeded by: Filip Bajković

Personal details
- Born: 28 March 1907 Podgorica, Montenegro
- Died: 4 February 1976 (aged 68) Igalo, SR Montenegro, Yugoslavia
- Party: League of Communists

Military service
- Branch/service: Yugoslav Partisans
- Rank: General Major
- Battles/wars: World War II in Yugoslavia

Blažo Jovanović (Serbo-Croatian Cyrillic; Блажо Јовановић; pronounced [blǎːʒɔ jɔʋǎːnɔʋitɕ]; 28 March 1907 – 4 February 1976) was a Montenegrin politician and revolutionary army commander in the Yugoslav Partisans. He served as the first President of the People's Assembly of Montenegro and was also the speaker of the Parliament of the People's Republic of Montenegro from 1954 to 1963.

== Biography ==
Blažo Jovanović was born in Podgorica, the largest city of Principality of Montenegro, into a middle class family. During World War II, he was one of the most important leaders of the Provincial Committee of the Yugoslav Communist Party of Montenegro, the Bay of Kotor and the Sandžak; in the summer of 1941 he was with Milovan Đilas, one of the main leaders of the Montenegrin insurrection against the Italian occupant.

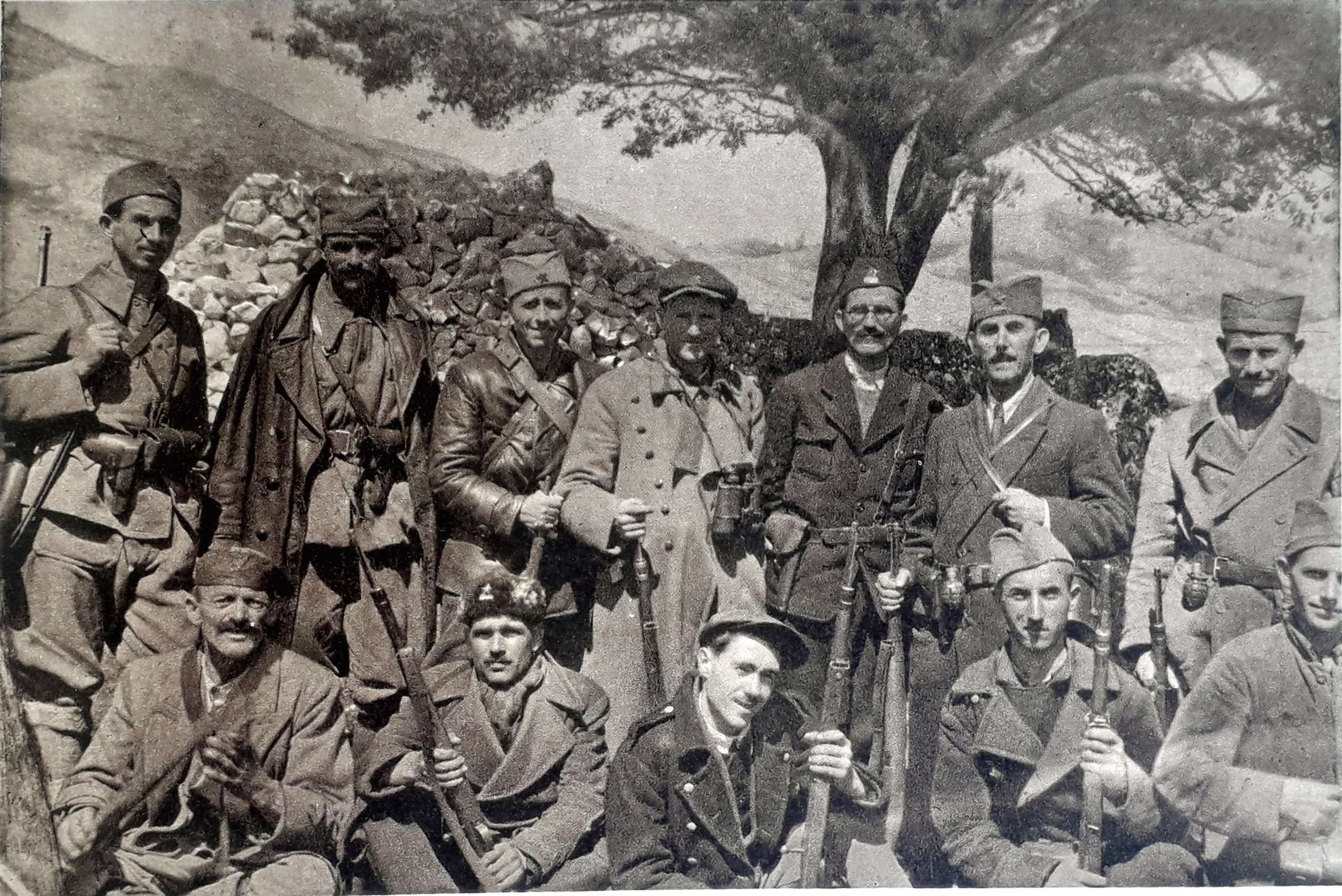
Leadership of partisan units from Montenegro. Standing from left to right: Mirko Burić, Blažo Jovanović, Mitar Bakić, Peko Dapčević, Ivan Milutinović, Savo Orović, Niko Strugar.

On 18 July 1941 he practically assumed the function of political commissar with the title of "person for the connection with the people" of the so-called "supreme temporary command" of the insurrectionary forces in Montenegro, while Đilas became the superior commander, and Arso Jovanović, a distant relative of Blažo, became the chief of staff. He was the second president of the People's Assembly of Montenegro, he was also president of the Parliament of the People's Republic of Montenegro from 1954 to 1963.

== See also ==
- League of Communists of Montenegro
  - President of the League of Communists of Montenegro
