= Marko Radulović (politician) =

Montenegrin politician (1866–1932)

- Марко Радуловић
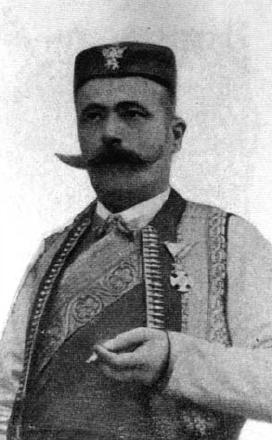
- Marko Radulović

3rd Prime Minister of Principality of Montenegro 2nd president of the Ministerial Council of Principality of Montenegro
- In office 24 November 1906 – 1 February 1907
- Monarch: Nicholas I
- Preceded by: Lazar Mijušković
- Succeeded by: Andrija Radović

4th Minister of Foreign Affairs of Principality of Montenegro
- In office 24 November 1906 – 1 February 1907
- Monarch: Nicholas I
- Prime Minister: Himself
- Preceded by: Lazar Mijušković
- Succeeded by: Andrija Radović

5th Minister of Justice of Kingdom of Montenegro
- In office 2 January – 15 January 1916
- Monarch: Nicholas I
- Prime Minister: Lazar Mijušković
- Preceded by: Ljubomir A. Brkic
- Succeeded by: Himself (as Minister of Justice of Kingdom of Montenegro in-Exile)

1st Minister of Justice of Kingdom of Montenegro in-Exile
- In office 15 January – 12 May 1916
- Monarch: Nicholas I
- Prime Minister: Lazar Mijušković
- Preceded by: Himself (as Minister of Justice of Kingdom of Montenegro)
- Succeeded by: Janko Spasojevic

7th Minister of Education and Ecclesiastical Affairs of Kingdom of Montenegro
- In office 2 January – 15 January 1916
- Monarch: Nicholas I
- Prime Minister: Lazar Mijušković
- Preceded by: Gavrilo M. Cerović
- Succeeded by: Himself (as Minister of Education and Ecclesiastical Affairs of Kingdom of Montenegro in-Exile)

1st Minister of Education and Ecclesiastical Affairs of Kingdom of Montenegro in-Exile
- In office 15 January – 12 May 1916
- Monarch: Nicholas I
- Prime Minister: Lazar Mijušković
- Preceded by: Himself (as Minister of Education and Ecclesiastical Affairs of Kingdom of Montenegro)
- Succeeded by: Pero Vucković

Personal details
- Born: 15 December 1866 Lepetani, Principality of Montenegro
- Died: 2 November 1932 (aged 65)
- Citizenship: Montenegro
- Party: People's Party
- Occupation: Politician
- Cabinet: Government of Marko Radulović

Marko Radulović (Serbian Cyrillic: Марко Радуловић; 15 December 1866 – 2 November 1932) was a Montenegrin politician and the third Head of Government of Principality of Montenegro from 24 November 1906 to 1 February 1907.

== Biography ==
Radulović was one of the founders of People's Party, the first political party in Montenegro in 1906. Following the 1906 parliamentary elections, the People's Party formed the first party-led government in Montenegrin history with Radulović as prime minister. In February 1907, People's Party leader Andrija Radović replaced Radulovic as the head of the government.

== Positions held ==
Political offices
Preceded by Lazar Mijušković	Prime Minister of Montenegro; 24 November 1906 – 1 February 1907	Succeeded by Andrija Radović
