= Andrija Radović =

Montenegrin politician

- Андрија Радовић
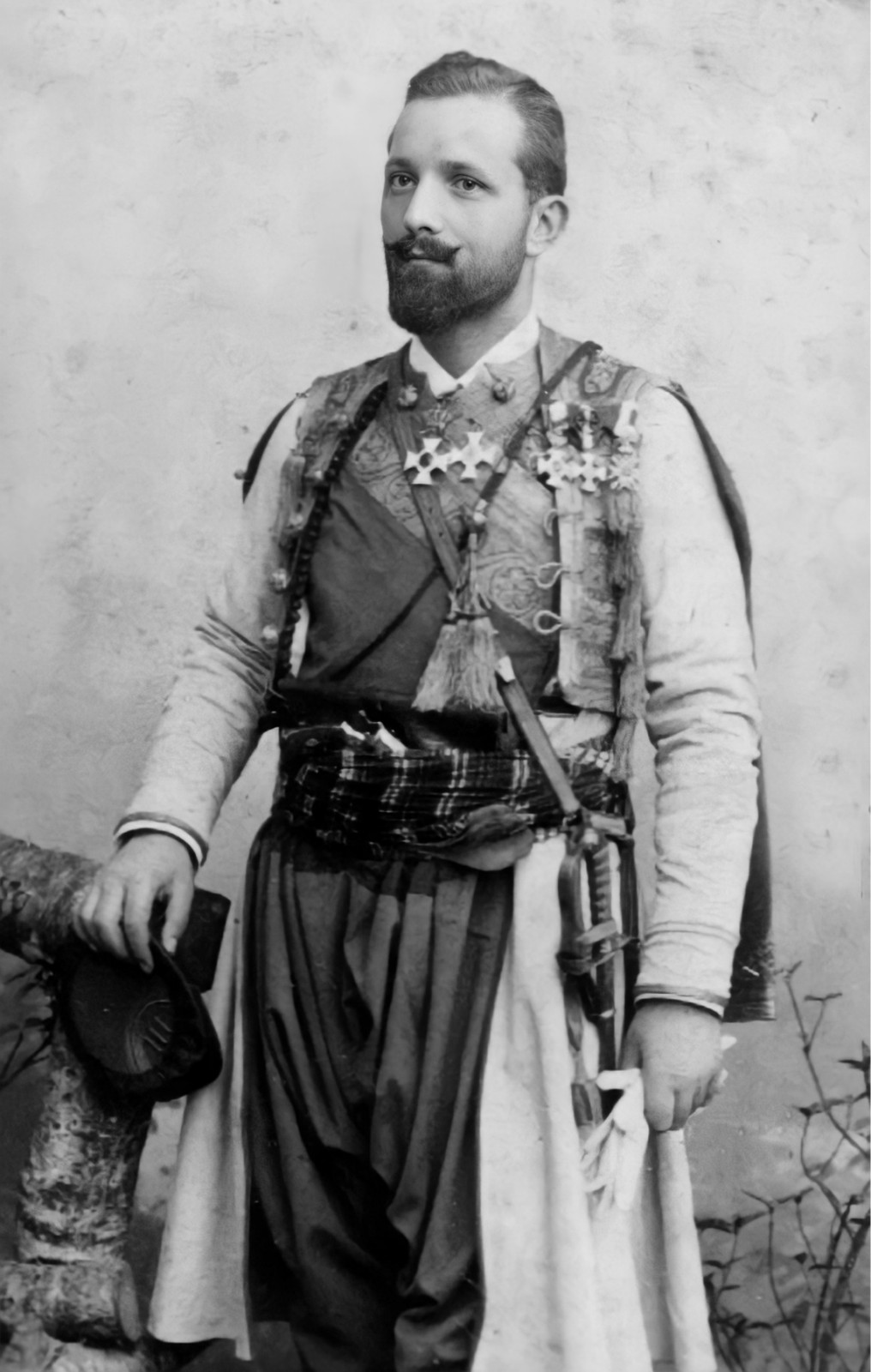
- Andrija Radović

4th Prime Minister of Principality of Montenegro
- In office 1 February – 17 April 1907
- Monarch: Nicholas I
- Preceded by: Marko Radulović
- Succeeded by: Lazar Tomanović

2nd Prime Minister of Kingdom of Montenegro in-Exile
- In office 12 May 1916 – 17 January 1917
- Monarch: Nicholas I
- Preceded by: Lazar Mijušković
- Succeeded by: Milo Matanović

3rd Minister of War of Principality of Montenegro
- In office 1 February – 17 April 1907
- Monarch: Nicholas I
- Prime Minister: Himself
- Preceded by: Danilo Gatalo
- Succeeded by: Mitar Martinović

4th and 6th Minister of Finance and Construction of Principality of Montenegro
- In office 19 December 1905 – 24 November 1906
- Monarch: Nicholas I
- Prime Minister: Lazar Mijušković
- Preceded by: Lazar Mijušković
- Succeeded by: Mitar Đurović
- In office 1 February 1907 – 17 April 1907
- Monarch: Nicholas I
- Prime Minister: Himself
- Preceded by: Mitar Đurović
- Succeeded by: Dušan Vukotić

6th Minister of Finance and Construction of Kingdom of Montenegro
- In office 2 January – 15 January 1916
- Monarch: Nicholas I
- Prime Minister: Lazar Mijušković
- Preceded by: Mirko Mijušković
- Succeeded by: Himself (as Minister of Finance of Kingdom of Montenegro in-Exile)

1st Minister of Finance and Construction of Kingdom of Montenegro in-Exile
- In office 15 January 1916 – 17 January 1917
- Monarch: Nicholas I
- Prime Minister: Lazar Mijušković; Himself
- Preceded by: Himself (as Minister of Finance of Kingdom of Montenegro)
- Succeeded by: Staniša Ijić

5th Minister of Foreign Affairs of Principality of Montenegro
- In office 1 February – 17 April 1907
- Monarch: Nicholas I
- Prime Minister: Himself
- Preceded by: Marko Radulović
- Succeeded by: Lazar Tomanović

2nd Minister of Foreign Affairs of Kingdom of Montenegro in-Exile
- In office 12 May 1916 – 17 January 1917
- Monarch: Nicholas I
- Prime Minister: Himself
- Preceded by: Lazar Mijušković
- Succeeded by: Milutin Tomanović

Personal details
- Born: 28 January 1872 Martinići, Danilovgrad, Principality of Montenegro
- Died: 1947 (74-75 years) Belgrade, Federal People's Republic of Yugoslavia
- Citizenship: Montenegro
- Party: People's Party; Democratic Party of Yugoslavia
- Parent: Jagoš (father)
- Occupation: Politician and military
- Cabinet: First and Second Government of Andrija Radović

Military service
- Allegiance: Montenegro
- Branch/service: Royal Montenegrin Army
- Rank: Vojvoda
- Battles/wars: Christmas Uprising

Andrija Radović (Serbian Cyrillic: Андрија Радовић; 1872–1947) was a Montenegrin politician and statesmen, former Prime Minister and leader of the People's and then Democratic Party, fighter for parliamentary democracy and chief proponent of Montenegro's unification with Serbia.

== Youth ==
Andrija Radović was born to father serdar Jagoš in the village of Martinići, Danilovgrad into the Bjelopavlići clan, in the still unrecognized Principality of Montenegro on 28 January 1872. After finishing the elementary and secondary schools in Cetinje, he went to professionalize in the Kingdom of Italy studying engineering at the Artillery-Engineering Academy from 1890 to 1894 as Nicholas' Pioneer. Upon returning, he got the job as the Military Engineer later raising to the position of Secretary of the Military Council and Court Marshal. At the end of the century, he was appointed by President of the State Council Božo Petrović-Njegoš as State Engineer, Director of Public Works and Head of Department in the Ministry of Internal Affairs. His 1902 marriage with the Duke's daughter proved to be a decisive connection for his career, as he intimately befriended the dynasty and was frequently sent as its representer on numerous European courts, because of his multi-linguistic capabilities. He actively worked until the general governmental structure was reformed by drafting a Constitution for the Montenegrin Princedom in 1905. From 6 December 1905 to 11 November 1906 he was both Minister of Finance and Construction in the reformist Government of Lazar Mijušković.

== Democratic Activities ==
Andrija Radović ran in his Captainy on the 27 September 1906 parliamentary elections and was elected into the very first session of the Montenegrin National Assembly that was formed in the capital of Cetinje on 31 October 1906. On 19 January 1907 he was sworn Prime Minister of the Princedom of Montenegro and took the post of Minister of Foreign Affairs and acted as the Representative of both the Ministers of War and Finance. 1907 was a year of great turmoil for Radović. He worked actively in an attempt to limit Prince Nicholas' autocracy and united all members of the Serbian National Assembly of the Princedom of Montenegro into the "Club of People's Representatives" (Клуб народних представника), which quickly transformed under the influence of neighboring parliamentary democracy in Serbia into the People's Party (Народна странка/Narodna stranka), the first and sole Montenegrin political party. Andrija became one of its two leaders. The movement quickly became known as "The Clubists" (Клубаши).

Radović rapidly lead the NS into opposition with the Monarch, demanding freedom, democracy and more rights to the people and that the Parliament should be the supreme holder of national sovereignty, and the not the sovereign himself. Disgusted also by the worsening relations of Montenegro with the allied brotherly Kingdom of Serbia, Andrija Radovic went into opposition in the face of Nicholas and promoted national enlightenment of the Montenegrin people and the spread of Serbian culture, religion as well as literacy in Montenegro. He demanded that the long promised union with Serbia started to finally be enacted and worked to cooperate with the Serbs outside Montenegro, as well as other South Slavs, in an attempt to achieve total national liberation and unification. It is because of the liberal actions is that Prince Nikola I Petrović-Njegoš sacked Andrija on 4 April 1907 and prosecuted him and his party, chasing them out of political life. Radović's party boycotted the unilaterally newly scheduled 31 October 1907 parliamentary election, as Nikola created his own True People's Party, the so-called "Rightists", that supported his regime and managed to get elected with very little votes because they were the only candidates. In the so-called 1908 Cetinje Bomb Trail in which the clubbists were massively prosecuted by the authorities for alleged conspiracies against Prince Nikola, Radović was sentenced to 15 years of prison as a political detainee while Marko Daković (Nikola's nephew) was sentenced to death in absentia.

In 1913 King Nicholas succumbed to popular demand and pardoned Andrija and others. This enabled Radović to correct his mistake and run on the 25 October 1913 free parliamentary election. Andrija's party decisively defeated the Rightists in the election. He was appointed State Councilor and since the outbreak of World War I he was in charge for supplying food and ammunition from the Allies for the Montenegrin Army. He was shown particularly successful in securing large amounts of ammo and guns from the neighboring Serbia already in late 1914. He also held the seat of Minister of Finance and Construction once more, this time from 20 December 1915 to 29 April 1916, in the national unity government of Milo Matanović.

== Exile and unification ==
In early 1916 the Kingdom of Montenegro was being occupied by the Central Powers, so Andrija fled together with Nikola to friendly free Italy. On 12 May 1916 Nicholas convinced him to form a Government of the Kingdom of Montenegro in Exile, which settled in Bordeaux, France. From October '16 he was stationed in Neuilly-sur-Seine which was given to Nicholas by the French for the capital of Montenegro in Exile. 1917 was another year of great activities by Radovic. After the government carefully drafted the Memorandum of Unification of Serbia and Montenegro, he as Prime Minister handed it over to King Nikola. The previous negotiations about forming a Yugoslavian confederate realm in which Montenegro would be an autonomous Principality headed by Nicholas have led to the Montenegrin highest officials in exile working on the matter. However the King didn't sign it to make it official, demanding that the form and process of unification should only be decided after the end of World War I.

As a sign of protest, Andrija resigned on 17 January 1917 the Premiership job and on 4 March 1917 he created the "Montenegrin Committee for National Unification" in Geneva with four other Montenegrin leaders, three Ministers and the High Judge. This Board worked in organizing the Montenegrin internees within Austria-Hungary, most notable of whom was Sekula Drljević, and founded Volunteer Legions sending them to fight on the Balkan Front. The Montenegrin Committee put forward liberation of Montenegro from Austro-Hungarian occupation and unification of Montenegro and Serbia into one state, which would then be joined by other Yugoslavian territories, as its prime goals. Andrija was the Editor-in-Chief of the Committee's "Unification" magazine printed since April '17 in Geneva that propagated the idea of unification of Serbia and Montenegro with national liberation against the Central Powers' occupation as an integral part of such a movement. For his turning to opposition of Nicholas once more, his financing was cut and he had to search the Serbian government in Exile for support. The "Unification" was published from August '17 to 15 November 1918 in Paris. The Yugoslav Committee and Serbian Royal Government signed the Corfu Declaration on 20 July 1917 that designed the future Kingdom of Serbs, Croats and Slovenes; the Montenegrin Board under Andrija Radović gave its consent and adopted the resolution's declarations. Andrija Radović also published his thesis on a democratic election and in detail explained the process of unification in his "Unification of Montenegro and Serbia" work that summed the basic lines of the Montenegrin government's memorandum. In October '18 Andrija Radovic formed together with three prominent supporters of a union with Serbia a Central Executive Committee for Unification of Serbia and Montenegro, that acted from the recently liberated Berane. On 25 October 1918 Andrija drafted the rules for election of a general Assembly and scheduled the election.

As a Deputy of Metropolitan bishop Gavrilo Dožić's White List within the on 19 November 1918 elected "Great National Assembly of the Serb People in Montenegro", he saw his work fulfilled on 26 November 1918 when unification of the Serbian people was proclaimed and King Nicholas I Petrović dethroned. He wrote a book about the situation in Montenegro and about its potential future inside Serbia, which was used as an informative source by the Allied Powers. The Italian-induced Green insurgents raised the Christmas Uprising on 7 January 1919; Radović supported and coordinated the Montenegrin Youth in fighting off the insurgents and subsequently crushing the remaining guerrilla resisters.

Chosen by the Great Serbian People's Assembly for representer of Montenegro, Andrija Radović went as the alongside Nikola Pašić in the Delegation on the Kingdom of Serbs, Croats and Slovenes to the 1919-1920 Paris Peace Conference. Radović convinced the victorious Great Powers of Nicholas' dreadful path and made them break off all links with the Montenegrin Government in Exile. As the expert of the Montenegrin question and offering some sort of a final option to the demanded self-determination of the Montenegrin People which Nikola and his close men pleaded for and worried about the bloody events induced by The Greens, he affirmed an agreement to wait for the Constitutional Assembly general election. In the case of majority's turnout and the victory of pro-unification forces, the created status will have to be accepted by everyone. He proposed the annexation of Shkodër and explained its question, which brought him in great conflict with Nikola Pasić who demanded respect of the international territorial integrity of Albania.

In '18 the Podgorica Assembly on its last session nominated Andrija as one of the Montenegrin members in the Kingdom's Collective Presidency. He was also elected into the Central Montenegrin Committee for Unification, a provisional executive administrating body for Montenegro in the process of unification. Though seated in Podgorica, Radović managed to move it to Cetinje demanding respect for Montenegro's historical legacy.

In August 1919 the Greens decided to attack Radović's property in Martinići, furious because of his acts. A detachment of Green rebels traveled four days from their outland hideout to the area of Podgorica and on 6 August 1919 broke into his family's home. They kidnapped Andrija's mother and sister and assaulted his father, who resisted with his personal gun and ended up quickly killed in the shooting. The Greens then left the building and burned the entire Radović household with the corps in it and then razed the remainder of the property. The house contained all of Andrija's precious things and the historical achievements of his family. He never heard from his mother and only sibling again. Andrija condemned the event and demanded that the perpetrators get punished, but that never occurred. He also called for seizure of violence and reconciliation of the two conflicted political currents in Montenegro.

Andrija Radović founded together with other prominent Montenegrin intellectuals the Democratic Party in Montenegro, inspired by the pro-reformist democratic views of the Kingdom's construction of DS. On the 28 November 1920 Constitutional Assembly election, he was elected in Montenegro into the parliament as DS's candidate. The election had international mediators and with more than a 67% turnout in Montenegro and victory of the unionist political options in Montenegro, Radović's unification acts were confirmed and the question was sealed, with the Greens' call for boycott suffering a decisive defeat. Radović's DS managed to continually locally win in the northern areas of former Montenegro.

Since 1921 he was member of the Directorate of Monopolies. Reelected into the parliament on the 11 September 1927 parliamentary election on DS's list, he was elected a member of the Yugoslavian National Bank. In 1928 appointed Vice-Governor of the Belgrade-based National Bank, he completely abandoned politics partially disappointed by the poor functioning of democracy in the Kingdom of Yugoslavia. Permanently moving to Belgrade, he spent the rest of his life there, including the World War II 1941-1944 Axis occupation. He reached an old age and died in 1947.

== Works ==
- Unification of Montenegro and Serbia, Geneva (1917)
- Le Montenegro, son passe et son avenir (Montenegro, its Past and Future), Paris (1918)
- Question de Scutari (The Question of Skadar), Paris (1919)

Preceded by Marko Radulović	Prime Minister of Montenegro; 1 February 1907–17 April 1907	Succeeded by Lazar Tomanović
Preceded by Lazar Mijušković	Prime Minister of Montenegro in-exile 12 May 1916–17 January 1917	Succeeded by Milo Matanović
