= Ministry of Foreign Affairs (Montenegro) =

Government ministry of Montenegro

Ministry of Foreign Affairs of Montenegro
- Ministarstvo vanjskih poslova

Agency overview
- Formed: 1831 (1991)
- Jurisdiction: Government of Montenegro
- Headquarters: Stanka Dragojevića 2, Podgorica
- Agency executive: Filip Ivanović, Minister of Foreign Affairs
- Website: gov.me/en/mvp

The Ministry of Foreign Affairs of Montenegro (Montenegrin: Ministarstvo vanjskih poslova u Vladi Crne Gore / Министарство вањских послова у Владе Црне Горе) is the foreign-affairs ministry in the Government of Montenegro.

== Ministers of Foreign Affairs since 1879 ==
=== Montenegrin monarchy ===
==== Principality of Montenegro ====
Minister of Foreign Affairs	Name (Birth–Death)	Term of office			Political party	Monarch
Minister of Foreign Affairs	Name (Birth–Death)	Took office	Left office	Time in office	Political party	Monarch
1	Vojvoda Stanko Radonjić	20 March 1879	14 October 1889	10 years, 208 days	Independent	Nicholas I (1860–1910)
2	Vojvoda Gavro Vuković (1852–1928)	14 October 1889	19 December 1905	16 years, 66 days	Independent	Nicholas I (1860–1910)
3	Lazar Mijušković (1867–1936)	19 December 1905	24 November 1906	340 days	True People's Party	Nicholas I (1860–1910)
4	Marko Radulović (1866–1935)	24 November 1906	1 February 1907	69 days	People's Party	Nicholas I (1860–1910)
5	Andrija Radović (1872–1947)	1 February 1907	17 April 1907	75 days	People's Party	Nicholas I (1860–1910)
6	Lazar Tomanović (1845–1932)	17 April 1907	28 August 1910	3 years, 133 days	Independent	Nicholas I (1860–1910)

==== Kingdom of Montenegro ====
Minister of Foreign Affairs	Name (Birth–Death)	Term of office			Political party	Monarch
Minister of Foreign Affairs	Name (Birth–Death)	Took office	Left office	Time in office	Political party	Monarch
(6)	Lazar Tomanović (1845–1932)	28 August 1910	23 August 1911	360 days	Independent	Nicholas I (1910–1916)
7	Dušan Gregović (1875–1923)	23 August 1911	19 June 1912	301 days	Independent	Nicholas I (1910–1916)
8	Vojvoda Mitar Martinović (1870–1954)	19 June 1912	8 May 1913	323 days	True People's Party	Nicholas I (1910–1916)
	Dušan Vukotić (Acting)	8 October 1912	8 May 1913	212 days	Independent	Nicholas I (1910–1916)
9	Petar Plamenac (1872–1954)	8 May 1913	10 September 1915	2 years, 126 days	Independent	Nicholas I (1910–1916)
10	Serdar Janko Vukotić (1866–1927)	10 September 1915	2 January 1916	113 days	Independent	Nicholas I (1910–1916)
-	Mirko M. Mijušković (1875–1948) (Acting)	3 October 1915	2 January 1916	91 days	Independent	Nicholas I (1910–1916)
(2)	Lazar Mijušković (1867–1936)	2 January 1916	25 January 1916	23 days	True People's Party	

==== Montenegrin government-in-exile ====
Minister of Foreign Affairs	Name (Birth–Death)	Term of office			Political party	Regent	Monarch
Minister of Foreign Affairs	Name (Birth–Death)	Took office	Left office	Time in office	Political party	Regent	Monarch
(2)	Lazar Mijušković (1867–1936)	25 January 1916	12 May 1916	108 days	True People's Party	Milena of Montenegro (1921–1923); Anto Gvozdenović (1921–1929)	Nicholas I (1916–1921); Danilo (1 March–7 March 1921); Mihailo (1921–1922)
(4)	Andrija Radović (1872–1947)	12 May 1916	17 January 1917	250 days	People's Party	Milena of Montenegro (1921–1923); Anto Gvozdenović (1921–1929)	Nicholas I (1916–1921); Danilo (1 March–7 March 1921); Mihailo (1921–1922)
11	Milutin Tomanović (1877–1940)	17 January 1917	11 June 1917	145 days	Independent	Milena of Montenegro (1921–1923); Anto Gvozdenović (1921–1929)	Nicholas I (1916–1921); Danilo (1 March–7 March 1921); Mihailo (1921–1922)
12	Evgenije Popović (1842–1931)	11 June 1917	17 February 1919	1 year, 251 days	Independent	Milena of Montenegro (1921–1923); Anto Gvozdenović (1921–1929)	Nicholas I (1916–1921); Danilo (1 March–7 March 1921); Mihailo (1921–1922)
13	Jovan Plamenac (1873–1944)	17 February 1919	28 June 1921	2 years, 131 days	True People's Party	Milena of Montenegro (1921–1923); Anto Gvozdenović (1921–1929)	Nicholas I (1916–1921); Danilo (1 March–7 March 1921); Mihailo (1921–1922)
14	Pero Šoć (1884–1966)	28 June 1921	14 September 1922	1 year, 78 days	Independent	Milena of Montenegro (1921–1923); Anto Gvozdenović (1921–1929)	Nicholas I (1916–1921); Danilo (1 March–7 March 1921); Mihailo (1921–1922)
15	General Anto Gvozdenović (1853–1935)	23 September 1922	14 September 1929	6 years, 356 days	Independent	Milena of Montenegro (1921–1923); Anto Gvozdenović (1921–1929)	Nicholas I (1916–1921); Danilo (1 March–7 March 1921); Mihailo (1921–1922)

== Ministers of Foreign Affairs, since 1991 ==
=== Union with Serbia ===
Name (Birth–Death)	Party	Term of Office	
Nikola Samardžić (1935–2005)	none	15 February 1991	1 August 1992
Miodrag Lekić (born 1947)	none	1 August 1992	17 May 1995
Janko Jeknić (1949–1997)	DPS	17 May 1995	17 January 1997
Branko Perović (born 1959)	DPS	17 January 1997	27 January 2000
Branko Lukovac (1944–2023)	none	27 January 2000	8 January 2003
Dragiša Burzan (born 1950)	SDP	8 January 2003	29 July 2004
Miodrag Vlahović (born 1961)	none	29 July 2004	10 November 2006

=== Restoration of Montenegrin independence ===
Name (Birth–Death)	Party	Term of Office	
Milan Roćen (born 1951)	DPS	10 November 2006	10 July 2012
Nebojša Kaluđerović (born 1955)	none	10 July 2012	4 December 2012
Igor Lukšić (born 1976)	DPS	4 December 2012	28 November 2016
Srđan Darmanović (born 1961)	none	28 November 2016	4 December 2020
Đorđe Radulović (born 1984)	none	4 December 2020	28 April 2022
Ranko Krivokapić (born 1961)	SDP	28 April 2022	21 October 2022
Dritan Abazović (born 1985)	URA	21 October 2022	31 October 2023
Filip Ivanović (born 1986)	PES	31 October 2023	23 July 2024
Ervin Ibrahimović (born 1972)	BS	23 July 2024	Incumbent
