= Lazar Mijušković =

Montenegrin politician and diplomat (1867–1936)

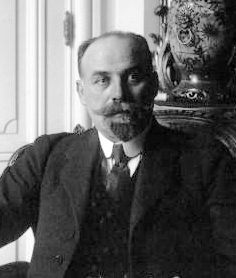
- Mijušković in 1916

2nd Prime Minister of Principality of Montenegro 1st President of the Ministerial Council of Principality of Montenegro
- In office 19 December 1905 – 24 November 1906
- Monarch: Nicholas I
- Preceded by: Božo Petrović-Njegoš
- Succeeded by: Marko Radulović

5th Prime Minister of Kingdom of Montenegro 5th President of the Ministerial Council of Kingdom of Montenegro
- In office 2 January – 15 January 1916
- Monarch: Nicholas I
- Preceded by: Janko Vukotić
- Succeeded by: Himself (as Prime Minister of Kingdom of Montenegro in Exile)

1st Prime Minister of Kingdom of Montenegro in Exile 1st President of the Ministerial Council of Kingdom of Montenegro in-Exile
- In office 15 January – 12 May 1916
- Monarch: Nicholas I
- Preceded by: Himself (as Prime Minister of Kingdom of Montenegro)
- Succeeded by: Andrija Radović

3rd Minister of Finance and Construction of Principality of Montenegro
- In office 16 June 1903 – 19 December 1905
- Monarch: Nicholas I
- Prime Minister: Božo Petrović-Njegoš
- Preceded by: Nikola Đ. Matanović
- Succeeded by: Andrija Radović

3rd Minister of Foreign Affairs of Principality of Montenegro
- In office 19 December 1905 – 24 November 1906
- Monarch: Nicholas I
- Prime Minister: Himself
- Preceded by: Gavro Vuković
- Succeeded by: Marko Radulović

7th Minister of Foreign Affairs of Kingdom of Montenegro
- In office 2 January – 15 January 1916
- Monarch: Nicholas I
- Prime Minister: Himsel
- Preceded by: Mirko M. Mijušković
- Succeeded by: Himself (as Minister of Foreign Affairs of Kingdom of Montenegro in-Exile)

1st Minister of Foreign Affairs of Kingdom of Montenegro in-Exile
- In office 15 January – 12 May 1916
- Monarch: Nicholas I
- Prime Minister: Himself
- Preceded by: Himsslf (as Minister of Foreign Affairs of Kingdom of Montenegro)
- Succeeded by: Andrija Radović

Ambassador of Montenegro to Belgrade
- In office 13 October 1913 – 1915
- Monarch: Nicholas I
- Prime Minister: Janko Vukotić
- Minister of Foreign Affairs: Petar Plamenac; Janko Vukotić

Personal details
- Born: 24 December 1867 Povija, Nikšić, Montenegro
- Died: 29 September 1936 (aged 68) Belgrade, Yugoslavia (now Serbia)
- Party: True People's Party
- Occupation: Politician, diplomat, engineer

Lazar Mijušković (Serbian Cyrillic: Лазар Мијушковић; 24 December 1867 – 29 September 1936) was a Montenegrin politician and diplomat.

== Biography ==
Mijušković was born on 24 December 1867 in the village of Povija in Pješivci, in the Principality of Montenegro. He obtained a degree as a mining engineer in Paris, France.

He performed the duty of Minister of Finance in Government of Principality of Montenegro from June 1903 to December 1905. He also served two terms as the President of the Ministerial Council (Prime Minister of Montenegro).

Mijušković was leader and one of the founders of the True People's Party, founded in 1907.

From 13 October 1913 to 1915 Mijušković was appointed as the ambassador of Montenegro in Belgrade.

== See also ==
- True People's Party
