= People's Party (Montenegro, 1906) =

People's Party Народна странка Narodna stranka
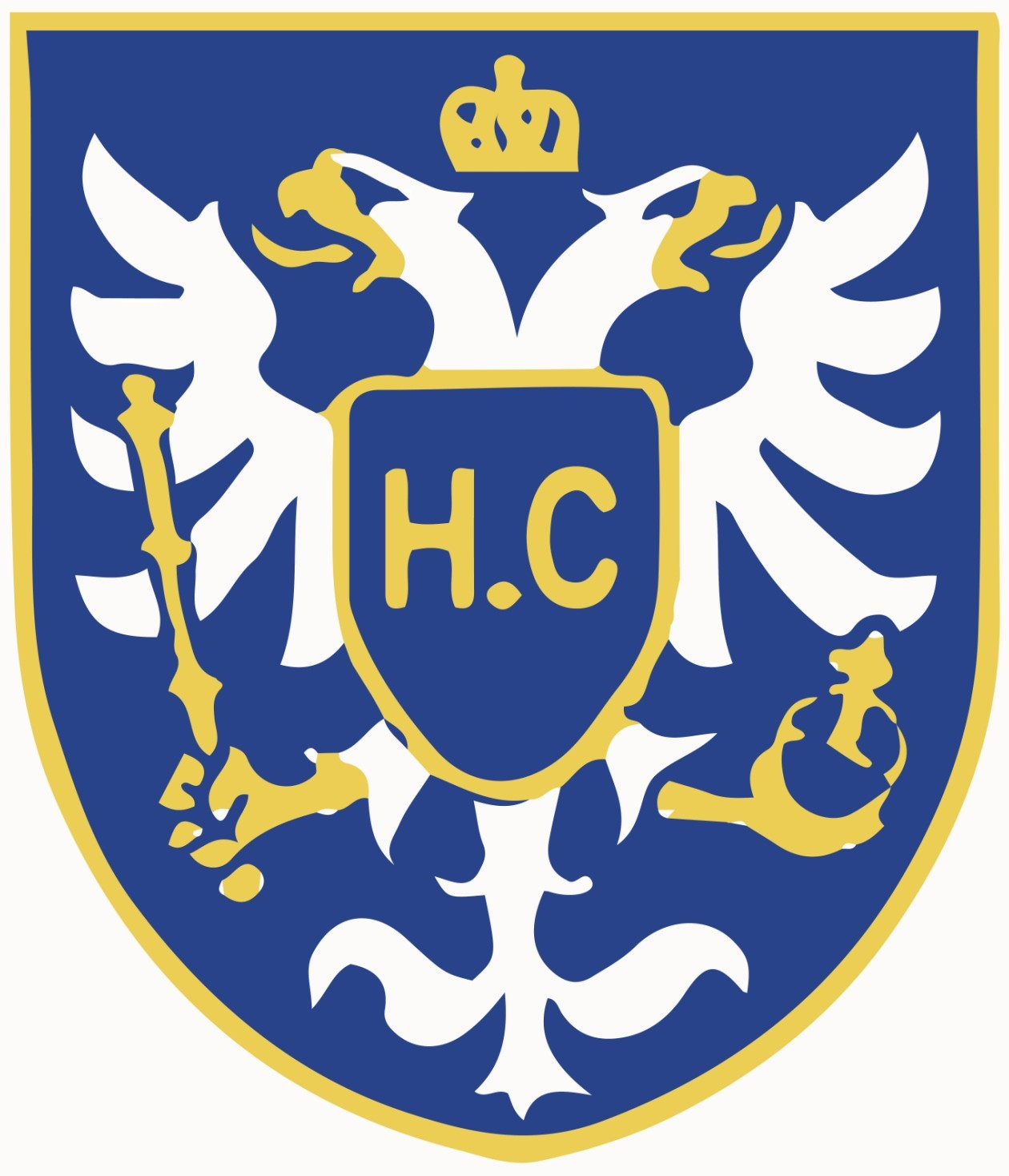
- Leader: Andrija Radović; Marko Radulović; Mihailo Ivanović
- Founder: Šako Petrović-Njegoš
- Founded: 1905
- Dissolved: 1919
- Merged into: People's Radical Party; Yugoslav Democratic Party
- Headquarters: Cetinje
- Newspaper: Narodna misao
- Military wing: Montenegrin Whites
- Ideology: National conservatism Conservative liberalism Serbian-Montenegrin unionism Yugoslav unionism
- Political position: Centre-right to right-wing
- Colours: Red, light blue and white (Pan-Slavic tricolor)

The People's Party (Serbian: Народна странка, romanized: Narodna stranka, abbr. НС/ NS), also known as the Klubaši or the Narodnjaci, was a political party in the Principality of Montenegro and the Kingdom of Montenegro. The party represented the opposition to King Nikola I. The People's Party main political goal was the dethroning of the Petrović-Njegoš dynasty and the unification of Montenegro and Serbia. The founder of the party was Šako Petrović-Njegoš, Nikola I's cousin, other notable founding members of the party included Andrija Radović, Marko Radulović and Mihailo Ivanović. As a response to the formation of the People's Party in 1907, Petrović-Njegoš dynasty loyalists organised themselves into the True People's Party, also known as the Rightists.

== Background ==
The Assembly of Montenegro was formed by the 1905 Constitution. The People's Party was first formed in 1906, when 27 deputies of the Assembly of Montenegro (out of 60, elected in 1905 election for the Constitutional Assembly) decided to form a club which would oppose the absolutist rule of Prince (later King) Nikola I Petrović-Njegoš. The parliament had only limited oversight authority, with Nikola I ruling almost single-handedly. Following the 1905 Constitution of the Princedom of Montenegro; this was challenged by the Parliament, which established the Club of People's Deputies (Klub narodnih poslanika), which resulted in the nickname klubaši (club members).

== History ==
The Club was transformed into the People's Party in the beginning of 1907. The party entered parliamentary life when the mandate to the crown became the representative of the parliament majority. Mihailo Ivanović, the leader of the party, succeeded the government after Lazar Mijušković, upon which he governed the so-called "Klubaši government" (klubaška vlada) under the presidency of Marko Radulović on 24 November 1906. The programme and statute were made by Mihailo Ivanović, Milosav Raičević, Mitar Vukčević and Ljubomir Bakić, all members of parliament. The party printed Narodni misao.

The party followed the "Serbian Idea" (Pan-Serbism), and parallel support for the "Yugoslav Idea" (Yugoslavism), which they saw as being of perspective and should result in the establishment of South Slavic states. The Party's goals were establishing democracy in Montenegro by transferring rule from the Monarch to the people, unification with Serbia and liberation of the rest of the Serb and South Slavic-populated lands under the Ottoman Empire and the Habsburg Monarchy. Their other aims were education and enlightenment of the people.

In September 1907 the People's Party decided to boycott the elections as a mark of protest against Nicholas' bad relations with Serbia. The party was suppressed by Prince Nikola, who dissolved the Montenegrin assembly in 1907 and then formed the True People's Party for his supporters. The True People's Party (pravaši) was the sole option on the elections and was thus elected to the Parliament. The pravaši supported Nicholas' rule and proclaimed him King in 1910.

At the 1914 election, the People's Party, which had been banned for more than seven years, won the absolute majority of votes and 25 MPs with the platform of unification of Montenegro with Serbia, whilst the governing True People's Party won just four elected seats. Shortly after the election Party formed a parliamentary majority of 44 seats in alliance with the group rallied around a former True People's Party leader Lazar Mijušković, which won 17 seats.

The party played a key role in the November 1918 Podgorica Assembly voting the abolition of the Montenegrin state, dethroning of the Petrović-Njegoš dynasty and declaring unconditionally annexation Montenegro to Kingdom of Serbia.

== Legacy ==
It was the first party in Montenegro. It was the only civil party in Montenegro until 1918. The new party named after the historical People's Party was established in 1990, after fall of communist regime and the introduction of multi-party system, regarded itself as the moral and spiritual heir of the historical party.

== Election results ==
Election	Seats	Change	Government	Notes
1905	27 / 60	▲27	Opposition	Club of People's Deputies, formally independents.
1906	51 / 76	▲24	Majority	People's Party and aligned independents.
1907	0 / 76	▼51	No seats	Boycotted, Party banned shortly after the election.
1911	9 / 62	▲9	Opposition	Party members, formally independents.
1914	25 / 62	▲16	Coalition	The People's Party dissolved in 1919.

== Sources ==
- Jelavich, Barbara (1983). History of the Balkans. Cambridge University Press. ISBN 978-0-521-27459-3.
- Krestić, Vasilije; Ljušić, Radoš (1991). Programi i statuti srpskih političkih stranaka do 1918. godine. Izdavačka kuća Književne novine. ISBN 9788639100964.
- Maletić, Mihailo (1976). Crna Gora. Književne novine.
- Pavlović, Srdja (2008). Balkan Anschluss: The Annexation of Montenegro and the Creation of the Common South Slavic State. Purdue University Press. ISBN 978-1-55753-465-1.
