= True People's Party =

True People's Party Права народна странка Prava narodna stranka
- Leader: Jovan Plamenac; Mitar Martinović; Lazar Mijušković
- Founder: Lazar Mijušković
- Founded: 1907
- Dissolved: 1918
- Succeeded by: Montenegrin Greens
- Headquarters: Cetinje
- Ideology: Conservatism; Monarchism; Souverainism
- Political position: Right-wing

The True People's Party (Serbian: Права народна странка, romanized: Prava narodna stranka, abbr. ПНС/ PNS), also known as the Pravaši (lit. 'the true ones'), was a conservative and monarchist political party in the Principality of Montenegro and the Kingdom of Montenegro, founded in 1907. The party represented the government, the rule of the Prince and later on the rule of King Nikola I. The True People's Party was led by Lazar Mijušković and notable party members included Jovan S. Plamenac, Marko Đukanović, Ivo Đurović, Sekula Drljević, Filip Jergović, Krsto Popović, Mitar Martinović and Milutin Vučinić. Montenegrin politics during the time of the party existence was deeply divided on the issue of supporting Nikola I's absolutist rule in order to retain the independence of Montenegro, and for advocating the unification of Montenegro and Serbia under the Karađorđević dynasty, as advocated by the opposition People's Party (NS).

== History ==
The party was founded in 1907 by Prince Nikola I due to the People's Party boycott during the elections at the time, as a mark of protest against the bad relations the Montenegrin government had with Serbia. The pravaši supported Nikola's rule and proclaimed him the King in 1910. At the 1914 elections, both Montenegrin parties ran and the People's Party defeated the True People's Party, winning most of the parliamentary seats. In the wake of the forthcoming Great War, some members of the True People's Party rejoined the People's Party and subsequently altered the program of the party to include the unification of Montenegro and Serbia. The party was officially dissolved in 1918 after the Podgorica Assembly proclaimed the unification of Montenegro with Serbia.

== Election results ==
Election	Seats	Change	Control	Notes
1907	76 / 76	▲76	absolute majority	True People's Party + aligned independents
1911	53 / 62	▼23	absolute majority	True People's Party + aligned independents
1914	6 / 62	▼47	opposition	Party dissolved in 1918

== Sources ==
- Pavlovic, Srdja (2008). Balkan Anschluss: The Annexation of Montenegro and the Creation of the Common South Slavic State. Purdue University Press. ISBN 978-1-55753-465-1.
- Mihailo Maletić (1976). Crna Gora. Književne novine.
