= Prime Minister of Montenegro =

Head of government

- Predsjednik Vlade Crne Gore; Предcjедник Владе Црне Горе
- Insignia

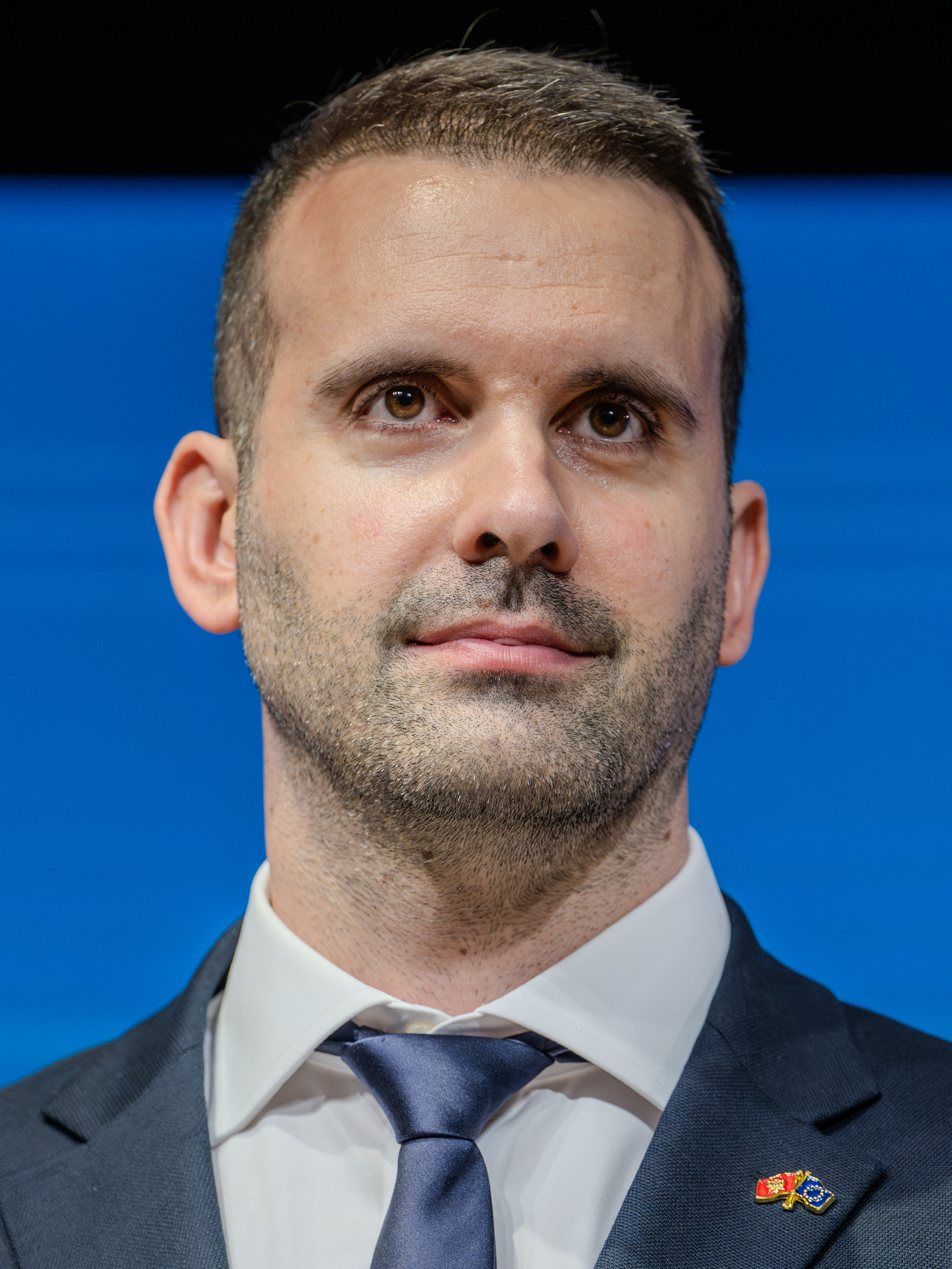
- Incumbent; Milojko Spajić since 31 October 2023
- Appointer: Parliament of Montenegro
- Term length: No term limit
- Inaugural holder: Božo Petrović-Njegoš
- Formation: 20 March 1879
- Salary: US$15,522 annually
- Website: www.gov.me

The prime minister of Montenegro (Note: Montenegrin: Premijer/Premijerka Crne Gore Montenegrin Cyrillic: Премијер/Премијерка Црне Горе), officially the president of the Government of Montenegro (Note: Montenegrin: Predśednik/Predśednica Vlade Crne Gore Montenegrin Cyrillic: Предс́едник/Предс́едница Владе Црне Горе Serbo-Croatian: Predsjednik/Predśednica Vlade Crne Gore Serbo-Croatian Cyrillic: Предсједник/Предсједница Владе Црне Горе), is the head of the government of Montenegro. The role of the prime minister is to direct the work of the government, and to submit to the Parliament the government's program, which includes a list of proposed ministers. The resignation of the prime minister would cause the dissolution of his government.

The current prime minister, Milojko Spajić, leader of the political party Europe Now!, was approved by the Parliament of Montenegro on 31 October 2023, after the formation of the 44th government of Montenegro.

== History ==
The first modern Montenegrin government was established on 20 March 1879, during the Principality of Montenegro. The title of the head of government was President of the Ministerial Council (Предсједник Министарског савјета).

On 28 August 1910, Montenegro was proclaimed a kingdom. During both the principality and the kingdom, the office was of no major importance or influence but depended solely on the will of the sovereign Nikola I. After the capitulation of Montenegro to the Central Powers on 15 January 1916, during World War I, the government went into exile and remained abroad until it ceased to exist. After the decision of the Podgorica Assembly on 26 November 1918, to unify Montenegro with Serbia and the subsequent formation of the Kingdom of Serbs, Croats and Slovenes, Stojan Protić became the prime minister of the newly formed Kingdom on 20 December 1918. The deposed King Nikola I continued to appoint prime ministers of Montenegro in exile until his death in 1921. The government of Montenegro in exile ceased to exist the next year.

Under the communist regime, Montenegro obtained its own government on 7 March 1945. On that day, a ministry for Montenegro was created within the government of Yugoslavia (as for all the other five republics), with a minister for Montenegro in charge of creating the first real government of post-war Montenegro, which took place on 17 April 1945. Governments were headed by a prime minister until 4 February 1953, by a president of the Executive Council until 15 January 1991, and again by a prime minister since then.

== List of prime ministers ==
=== Monarchy ===
True People's Party People's Party Non-party

Head of Government	Name (Birth–Death)	Term of office			Political party	Regent (Note: Since 7 March 1921, when Danilo abdicated and Mihailo was of minor age, Queen Milena was regent under Mihailo. On 14 September 1929, the regency of Anto Gvozdenović ended and Mihailo renounced his dynasty's claim to the throne of Montenegro and declared allegiance to the Kingdom of Yugoslavia.)	Monarch
Head of Government	Name (Birth–Death)	Took office	Left office	Time in office	Political party	Regent	Monarch
Principality of Montenegro							Nikola I (1860–1921)
1	Vojvoda Božo Petrović-Njegoš (1846–1929)	20 March 1879	19 December 1905	26 years, 274 days	Independent		Nikola I (1860–1921)
2	Lazar Mijušković (1867–1936)	19 December 1905	24 November 1906	340 days	True People's Party		Nikola I (1860–1921)
3	Marko Radulović (1866–1932)	24 November 1906	1 February 1907	69 days	People's Party		Nikola I (1860–1921)
4	Andrija Radović (1872–1947)	1 February 1907	17 April 1907	75 days	People's Party		Nikola I (1860–1921)
5	Lazar Tomanović (1845–1932)	17 April 1907	28 August 1910	3 years, 133 days	Independent		Nikola I (1860–1921)
Kingdom of Montenegro							Nikola I (1860–1921)
(5)	Lazar Tomanović (1845–1932)	28 August 1910	19 June 1912	1 year, 296 days	Independent		Nikola I (1860–1921)
6	Vojvoda Mitar Martinović (1870–1954)	19 June 1912	8 May 1913	323 days	True People's Party		Nikola I (1860–1921)
–	Dušan Vukotić (Acting) (Note: When Mitar Martinović was on the military camp, he was represented by Dušan Vukotić.)	3 October 1912	8 May 1913	217 days	Independent		Nikola I (1860–1921)
7	Serdar Janko Vukotić (1866–1927)	8 May 1913	2 January 1916	2 years, 239 days	Independent		Nikola I (1860–1921)
–	General Risto Popović (1871–1924) (Acting) (Note: When World War I started and Janko Vukotić was on military camp, he was represented by Risto Popović, Minister of Finance and War, and Mirko Mijušković, Minister of Finance, successor of Risto Popović.)	17 July 1914	2 January 1916	1 year, 199 days	Independent		Nikola I (1860–1921)
–	Mirko Mijušković (1875–1948) (Acting)	3 October 1915	2 January 1916	91 days	Independent		Nikola I (1860–1921)
(2)	Lazar Mijušković (1867–1936)	2 January 1916	25 January 1916	23 days	True People's Party		Nikola I (1860–1921)
Montenegrin government-in-exile							Nikola I (1860–1921)
(2)	Lazar Mijušković (1867–1936)	25 January 1916	12 May 1916	108 days	True People's Party		Nikola I (1860–1921)
(4)	Andrija Radović (1872–1947)	12 May 1916	17 January 1917	250 days	People's Party		Nikola I (1860–1921)
8	General Milo Matanović (1879–1955)	17 January 1917	11 June 1917	145 days	Independent		Nikola I (1860–1921)
9	Evgenije Popović (1842–1931)	11 June 1917	17 February 1919	1 year, 251 days	Independent		Nikola I (1860–1921)
10	Jovan Plamenac (1873–1944)	17 February 1919	28 June 1921	2 years, 131 days	True People's Party		Nikola I (1860–1921)
10	Jovan Plamenac (1873–1944)	17 February 1919	28 June 1921	2 years, 131 days	True People's Party		Danilo (1–7 March 1921)
10	Jovan Plamenac (1873–1944)	17 February 1919	28 June 1921	2 years, 131 days	True People's Party	Milena of Montenegro (1921–1923) Anto Gvozdenović (1921–1929)	Mihailo (1921–1922)
11	General Milutin Vučinić (1869–1922)	28 June 1921	14 September 1922	1 year, 78 days	True People's Party	Milena of Montenegro (1921–1923) Anto Gvozdenović (1921–1929)	Mihailo (1921–1922)
(10)	Jovan Plamenac (1873–1944) (Note: Self-proclaimed prime minister.)	16 September 1922	23 September 1922	7 days	True People's Party	Milena of Montenegro (1921–1923) Anto Gvozdenović (1921–1929)	Mihailo (1921–1922)
12	General Anto Gvozdenović (1853–1935) (Note: Prime minister appointed by Queen Milena.)	23 September 1922	14 September 1929	6 years, 356 days	Independent	Milena of Montenegro (1921–1923) Anto Gvozdenović (1921–1929)	Mihailo (1921–1922)
From 1922 until 1941 territory of Montenegro was part of Zeta oblast and later banovina within Kingdom of Yugoslavia.

=== Socialist republic ===
Communist Party/League of Communists

Head of Government	Name (Birth–Death)	Term of office			Political party
Head of Government	Name (Birth–Death)	Took office	Left office	Time in office	Political party
Minister for Montenegro
–	Milovan Đilas (1911–1995)	7 March 1945	17 April 1945	41 days	Communist Party
Prime Minister of NR Montenegro
1 (13)	General Blažo Jovanović (1907–1976)	17 April 1945	4 February 1953	7 years, 293 days	Communist Party (party renamed) League of Communists (party renamed)
President of the Executive Council
1 (13)	General Blažo Jovanović (1907–1976)	4 February 1953	16 December 1953	315 days	League of Communists
2 (14)	Filip Bajković (1910–1985)	16 December 1953	12 July 1962	8 years, 208 days	League of Communists
3 (15)	Đorđije Pajković (1917–1980)	12 July 1962	25 June 1963	348 days	League of Communists
4 (16)	Veselin Đuranović (1925–1997)	25 June 1963	8 December 1966	3 years, 166 days	League of Communists
5 (17)	Mijuško Šibalić (1915–1995)	8 December 1966	5 May 1967	148 days	League of Communists
6 (18)	Vidoje Žarković (1927–2000)	5 May 1967	7 October 1969	2 years, 155 days	League of Communists
7 (19)	Žarko Bulajić (1922–2009)	7 October 1969	6 May 1974	4 years, 211 days	League of Communists
8 (20)	Marko Orlandić (1930–2019)	6 May 1974	28 April 1978	3 years, 357 days	League of Communists
9 (21)	Momčilo Cemović (1928–2001)	28 April 1978	7 May 1982	4 years, 9 days	League of Communists
10 (22)	Radivoje Brajović (born 1935)	7 May 1982	6 June 1986	4 years, 30 days	League of Communists
11 (23)	Vuko Vukadinović (1937–1993)	6 June 1986	29 March 1989	2 years, 296 days	League of Communists
12 (24)	Radoje Kontić (born 1937)	29 March 1989	15 February 1991	1 year, 323 days	League of Communists

=== Parliamentary republic ===
Democratic Party of Socialists United Reform Action Independent

Head of Government	Name (Birth–Death)	Election	Term of office			Political party	President
Head of Government	Name (Birth–Death)	Election	Took office	Left office	Time in office	Political party	President
Republic of Montenegro (Constituent republic of the Federal Republic of Yugoslavia / Serbia and Montenegro)							President
1 (25)	Milo Đukanović (born 1962)	1990; 1992; 1996	15 February 1991	5 February 1998	6 years, 355 days	Democratic Party of Socialists	Momir Bulatović (1990–1998)
2 (26)	Filip Vujanović (born 1954)	1998; 2001	5 February 1998	8 January 2003	4 years, 337 days	Democratic Party of Socialists	Milo Đukanović (1998–2002)
(1) (25)	Milo Đukanović (born 1962)	2002	8 January 2003	3 June 2006	3 years, 133 days	Democratic Party of Socialists	Filip Vujanović (2003–2018)
Montenegro (Independent country)							Filip Vujanović (2003–2018)
(1) (25)	Milo Đukanović (born 1962)	—	3 June 2006	10 November 2006	173 days	Democratic Party of Socialists	Filip Vujanović (2003–2018)
3 (27)	Željko Šturanović (1960–2014)	2006	10 November 2006	29 February 2008	1 year, 111 days	Democratic Party of Socialists	Filip Vujanović (2003–2018)
(1) (25)	Milo Đukanović (born 1962)	2009	29 February 2008	29 December 2010	2 years, 304 days	Democratic Party of Socialists	Filip Vujanović (2003–2018)
4 (28)	Igor Lukšić (born 1976)	—	29 December 2010	4 December 2012	1 year, 341 days	Democratic Party of Socialists	Filip Vujanović (2003–2018)
(1) (25)	Milo Đukanović (born 1962)	2012	4 December 2012	28 November 2016	3 years, 360 days	Democratic Party of Socialists	Filip Vujanović (2003–2018)
5 (29)	Duško Marković (born 1959)	2016	28 November 2016	4 December 2020	4 years, 6 days	Democratic Party of Socialists	Milo Đukanović (2018–2023)
6 (30)	Zdravko Krivokapić (born 1957)	2020	4 December 2020	28 April 2022	1 year, 145 days	Independent; Ne damo Crnu Goru	Milo Đukanović (2018–2023)
7 (31)	Dritan Abazović (born 1985)	—	28 April 2022	31 October 2023	1 year, 186 days	United Reform Action	Jakov Milatović (2023–present)
8 (32)	Milojko Spajić (born 1987)	2023	31 October 2023	Incumbent	2 years, 335 days	Europe Now!	Jakov Milatović (2023–present)

== See also ==
- Government of Montenegro
- Guvernadur of Montenegro
- List of heads of state of Montenegro
- President of Montenegro
  - List of presidents of Montenegro
