= Princesses of Montenegro =

This is a list of princesses of Montenegro, including those who continued to use the title after Montenegro, Serbia and the Kingdom of Serbs, Croats and Slovenes (later Yugoslavia) ceased to be monarchies.

== Princesses by blood ==
Image	Name	Birth	Death	Spouse	Father
	Olga Petrović Njegoš	19 March, 1859 Cetinje, Montenegro	21 September, 1896 (Aged 37) Venice, Italy		Danilo I, Prince of Montenegro
	Princess Zorka of Montenegro	23 December, 1864 Cetinje, Montenegro	16 March, 1890 (Aged 25) Cetinje, Montenegro	Peter I of Serbia	Nicholas I of Montenegro
	Princess Milica of Montenegro	14 July 1866 Cetinje, Montenegro	5 September 1951 (Aged 85) Alexandria, Kingdom of Egypt	Grand Duke Peter Nikolaevich of Russia	Nicholas I of Montenegro
	Princess Anastasia of Montenegro	4 January 1868 Cetinje, Montenegro	15 November 1935 (Aged 67) Cap d'Antibes, French Third Republic	George Maximilianovich, 6th Duke of Leuchtenberg; Grand Duke Nicholas Nikolaevich of Russia	Nicholas I of Montenegro
	Princess Marija of Montenegro	29 March 1869	7 May 1885 (Aged 16) St. Petersburg, Russia		Nicholas I of Montenegro
	Elena of Montenegro	8 January 1873 Cetinje, Montenegro	28 November 1952 (Aged 79) Montpellier, France	Victor Emmanuel III of Italy	Nicholas I of Montenegro
	Princess Anna of Montenegro	18 August 1874 Cetinje, Montenegro	22 April 1971 (Aged 96) Montreux, Switzerland	Prince Francis Joseph of Battenberg	Nicholas I of Montenegro
	Princess Xenia of Montenegro	22 April 1881 Cetinje, Montenegro	10 March 1960 (aged 78) Paris, France		Nicholas I of Montenegro
	Princess Vjera of Montenegro	22 February 1887 Rijeka Crnojevića, Montenegro	31 October 1927 (Aged 40) Cap d'Antibes, France		Nicholas I of Montenegro
	Princess Altinaï of Montenegro	27 October 1977 (age 44) Les Lilas, France		Anton Martynov	Nicholas, Crown Prince of Montenegro

== Princesses by marriage ==
For a list of Princesses and Queens Consort, see List of Montenegrin royal consorts.

Image	Name	Birth	Death	Spouse	Father
	Duchess Jutta of Mecklenburg-Strelitz	24 January 1880 Neustrelitz, Mecklenburg-Strelitz, German Empire	17 February 1946 (aged 66) Rome, Kingdom of Italy	Danilo, Crown Prince of Montenegro	Adolphus Frederick V, Grand Duke of Mecklenburg-Strelitz (m. 1899; died 1939)
	Natalija Konstantinović	10 October 1882 Trieste, Austria-Hungary	21 August 1950 (aged 67) Paris, France	Prince Mirko of Montenegro Gaston Errembault de Dudzeele	Colonel Alexander Konstantinović
	Violet Wegner	1887	1960 (aged 73)	Comte Sergio Francesco Enrico Maria Brunetta d'Usseaux Prince Peter of Montenegro	William Theodore Wegner
	Geneviève Denise Charlotte Prigent	4 December 1919, Saint-Brieuc	26 January 1990 (aged 70), Lannion	Michael, Prince of Montenegro	Dr. François Marie Prigent
	Francine Navarro	27 January 1950 Casablanca	6 August 2008 (aged 58), Paris	Nicholas, Crown Prince of Montenegro	Antoine Navarro
	Véronique Haillot Canas da Silva	27 July 1976 São Sebastião da Pedreira, Lisbon		Boris Petrovitch Njegosh	António Canas da Silva
