= Princess Xenia of Montenegro =

Montenegrin princess (1881–1960)

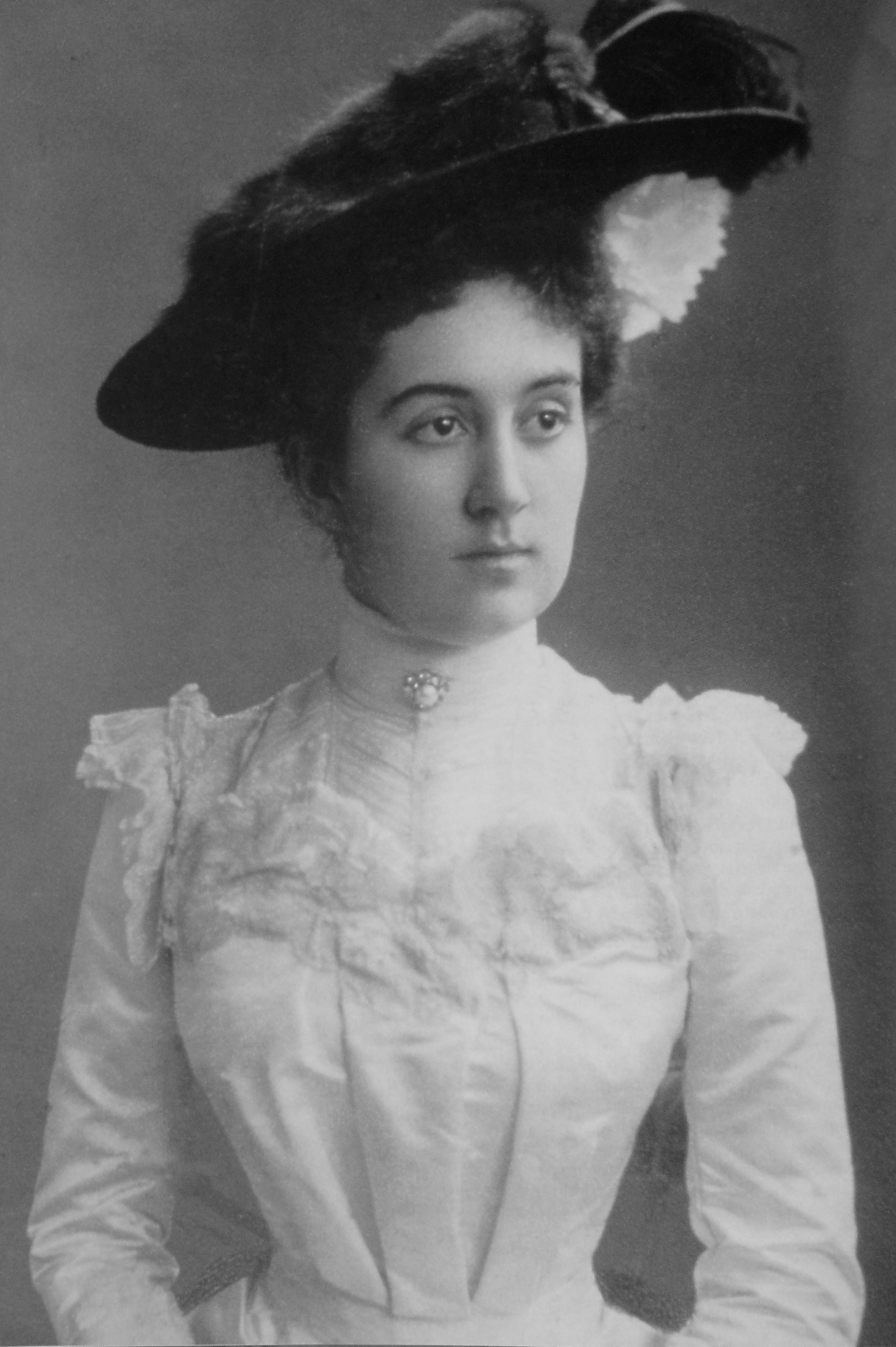
- Born: 22 April 1881; Cetinje, Montenegro
- Died: 10 March 1960 (aged 78); Paris, France
- Burial: Court Church, Cetinje
Names
- Ksenija Petrović-Njegoš
- House: Petrović-Njegoš
- Father: Nicholas I of Montenegro
- Mother: Milena Vukotić
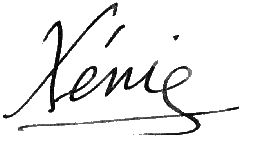
- Signature

Princess Xenia Petrović-Njegoš of Montenegro, also known as Princess Ksenija or Kseniya, (22 April 1881 – 10 March 1960) was a member of the House of Petrović-Njegoš as a daughter of Nicholas I of Montenegro.

As a young woman, Princess Xenia's appearance in contemporary newspapers was almost entirely the result of seemingly never-ending rumours of suitors, engagements, and marriages. Speculated candidates included but were not limited to Alexander I of Serbia; Greek brothers Prince Nicholas, Prince George, and Prince Andrew; and Ernest Louis, Grand Duke of Hesse, among others.

== Early life ==
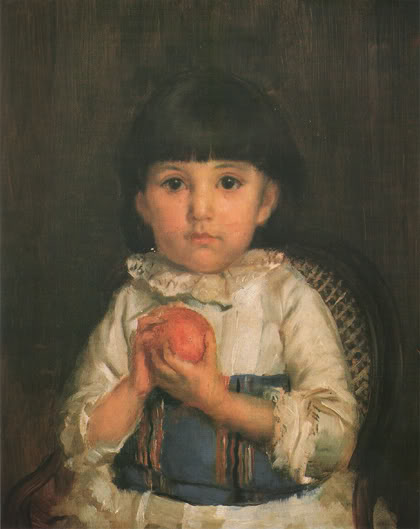
Portrait of an infant Xenia, painted by Vlaho Bukovac, 1888

Princess Xenia of Montenegro was born in Cetinje on 22 April 1881 as the eighth daughter of Nicholas I of Montenegro and his wife, Milena of Montenegro. Unlike her eldest sisters, Princess Xenia was not sent to study in Russia at the Smolny Institute. Along with her younger sister, Princess Vjera, Xenia was educated at home by tutors in Cetinje. Xenias's sisters were particularly noted for achieving marriages with powerful royal figures, causing their father, like the contemporary Christian IX of Denmark, to earn the sobriquet "father-in-law of Europe"; one source declared that these advantageous marriages "had done more for Montenegro than all the brave deeds of this nation of warriors". As young girls, Xenia's father had high hopes that she and her sister Vjera would marry members of the Russian Imperial family: specifically one of the sons of Grand Duke Constantine Constantinovich of Russia or one of the sons of Grand Duke Alexander Mikhailovich of Russia. Two of her elder sisters had already done so, as Princess Milica was married to Grand Duke Peter Nikolaevich and Princess Anastasia had married firstly to George Maximilianovich, 6th Duke of Leuchtenberg and secondly to Grand Duke Nicholas Nikolaevich.

In 1898, Princesses Xenia and Vera, and Crown Prince Danilo traveled with their mother to Italy in order to visit the recently married Elena of Montenegro (who had married Crown Prince Victor Emmanuel of Italy). They were warmly welcomed by local residents in Naples as "our Princess' relations". Later that year, arrangements were made for Xenia to wed Alexander I of Serbia. However, when Alexander went to the court at Cetinje to claim his soon-to-be wife, Xenia professed such "disgust and horror" at his appearance and manners that despite her father's entreaties, she refused to marry him, humiliating and angering him so much that diplomatic relations between Serbia and Montenegro were severed. Alexander's adoption of her brother Prince Mirko of Montenegro as heir apparent in 1901 was meant, among other things, to smooth over these old affronts.

== Rumours and engagements ==
At the July 1899 wedding of her brother Crown Prince Danilo to Duchess Jutta of Mecklenburg-Strelitz, Princess Xenia met Prince Nicholas of Greece and Denmark, who was there representing his father George I of Greece. Later that year, the betrothal of Princess Xenia to Nicholas was announced. For reasons unknown, their engagement fell apart and the couple never married. Nicholas later wed Grand Duchess Elena Vladimirovna of Russia. Other news stories reported that Xenia was engaged at different times to Nicholas' brothers Prince George and Prince Andrew.

In 1902, rumours spread of Xenia's engagement to Ernest Louis, Grand Duke of Hesse, who had recently divorced Princess Victoria Melita of Saxe-Coburg and Gotha. These were stressed to be untrue, and only arose because Xenia had visited her sister Princess Anna of Montenegro in Darmstadt, where Ernest Louis was residing. Another rumour coincidentally spread that Xenia would marry Grand Duke Cyril Vladimirovich of Russia, barring that his entreaties of marriage to Princess Victoria Melita were denied because of her divorced status. This particular rumour was greeted with some popularity, as Xenia had been raised in Russia, and was, like Cyril, a follower of the Eastern Orthodox religion.

Yet another rumour spread in 1904 that Xenia was engaged to Grand Duke Michael Alexandrovich, the heir apparent to the Russian throne. By this point, the appearance in newspapers of her countless engagements, marriages, and attachments led to a certain degree of incredulity about this particular rumour. Through the years, others would claim she was engaged to Prince Vittorio Emanuele, Count of Turin, Prince Luigi Amedeo, Duke of the Abruzzi, Ferdinand I of Bulgaria, and even her widowed brother-in-law Peter I of Serbia. Doubtless the promised dowry of one million rubles, her family's reputation for "robust health," as well as contemporary reports extolling her "beauteous" appearance helped contribute to these royal admirers and the newspapers circulating ever more rumours about the princess. Princess Xenia was said to be "extremely wholesome" and in possession of a "sunny disposition", and was known throughout Montenegro "as much for her charity as for her activity in athletic sports".

=== A single princess ===
Despite the countless rumours circulating about her various impending engagements and marriages, Princess Xenia chose to remain unmarried. As her father Prince Nicholas grew older, Xenia served as a "subtle but prejudiced councilor of his later years". In 1909, during some disagreements between Montenegro and Austria, Xenia took a conspicuous and leading part in some anti-Austrian protests in Cetinje. The Austrian government took her actions as an insult and called for the strongest kind of diplomatic protest; as Nicholas was indebted to Austria for many past favors, especially concerning financial assistance, he was unsure what punishment should be given out to his daughter, and eventually decided on temporarily exiling her to France. Xenia readily agreed to her father's demands, and enjoyed herself in Paris, where she spent her time shopping, going to the theater and the opera, and being entertained by leaders in Parisian society.

Nicholas was crowned King of Montenegro on 28 August 1910. During the Balkan campaigns of World War I, the king and his family fled to Italy, and Antibes, France after his country and Austria could not come to agreement over peace negotiations. The terms Austria offered were deemed to be too unacceptable in Montenegro, and the royal family, along with the diplomatic corps, consequently fled. In cooperation with activist Alexander Devine, Princess Xenia and her sister Vera helped organize the relief of interned Montenegrin prisoners in Austria.

== Last years ==
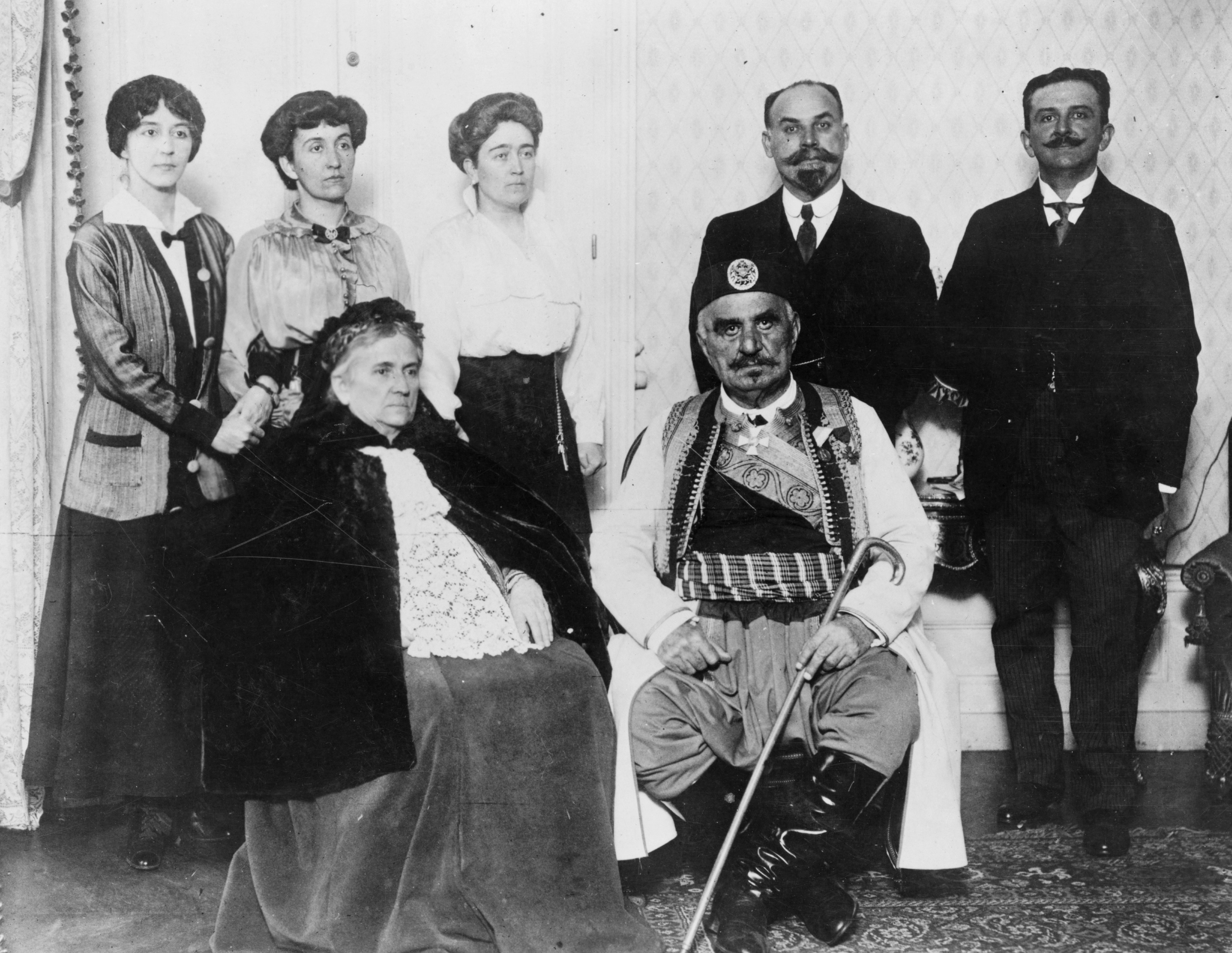
Princess Xenia with her family in exile. Front row: King and queen. Back row, left to right: Princess Vjera, Princess Xenia, Princess Militza (wife of Prince Danilo), Lazar Mijušković, President of the council, and Crown Prince Danilo, in Lyon, France, 1916.

After the fall of the Montenegrin monarchy in 1918, Princess Xenia retired to live in France, where she survived World War II and continued to live in Paris. She died in Paris, France, on 10 March 1960.

After her death, her devoted work to Montenegrin photography would become the focus of a 2010 exhibit at the Slovenian Galerija Fotografija. The exhibit read:

The materially modest legacy of Princess Ksenija [Xenia] provides us with almost intimate insight into the private life of Montenegrin Princess Ksenija who has been famous for her intellect and talent but before everything she has been known as an adamant patriot. Her deep love for Montenegrin nation and homeland is expressed through images of Montenegrin everyday life which were made during the peaceful time of her life, before she found herself in an unacceptable situation of a refugee. Photographs of Princess Ksenija are images which were deeply impressed upon her memory, and that she cherished with love throughout the decades of exile, reaching out for them in the moments of despair and nostalgia. That was the Montenegro in the magic eye of Montenegrin Princess. That is the Montenegro of her youth, of her hopes, beliefs, her hidden thoughts, and unrealised ambitions.

Princess Xenia is one of the principal subjects of the essay collection No Man's Lands: eight extraordinary women in Balkan history, by the British-Kosovan writers Elizabeth Gowing and Robert Wilton.

== Ancestry ==
Ancestors of Princess Xenia of Montenegro

8. Serdar Stanko Petrović-Njegoš
4. Mirko Petrović-Njegoš, Grand Voivode of Grahovo
9. Krstinja Vrbica
2. Nicholas I of Montenegro
10. Voivode Drago Martinović
5. Anastasija Martinović
11. Anastasija Ludović
1. Princess Xenia of Montenegro
12. Serdar Petar Perkov Vukotić
6. Voivode Petar Vukotić
13. Anastasija Milić
3. Milena Vukotić
14. Tadija Vojvodić
7. Jelena Vojvodić
15. Milica Pavićević

== See also ==
- Petrović-Njegoš family tree
- List of Montenegrins
