= Petrović-Njegoš family tree =

The Petrović-Njegoš dynasty originated from Zenica, Bosnia and Herzegovina. Later, they migrated to an area close to Trebinje, Herzegovina. Later, they migrated to the region of Drobnjaci. Later, they settled in Njeguši.

== Ancestors ==
Bogut	?
Đurađ Bogutović
Vukašin (Vukca) Đurđević	Ostoje Đurđević	Pribila (Pribislav) Đurđević	Radina Đurđević	Herak Đurđević
Pribo (Pribil or Pribislav)	Vlatko (Ratko)	Luka Pribislavov	Jovko Radinojev	Pribo (Pribil or Pribislav) Vukšić	Vukac Radinojev	Herak Heraković
Stijepo Heraković
Luka Stijepović Heraković
Stjepan Kaluđer Heraković
Petar Kaluđerov Heraković
Stijepo Petra Kaluđerova Herakovi
Petar Kaluđerov Heraković

== Rulers of Montenegro ==
Prince-Bishop of Montenegro
Prince of Montenegro
King of Montenegro

Radul c. 1620 – ?
Ivan c. 1648 – ?	Scepan c. 1650 – ?
Sava II; 1702 – 1782 r. 1735–1781	Radul c. 1670 – ?	Danilo I 1670 – 1735 r. 1695–1735	Damjan c. 1676 – ?
Vasilije III; 1709 – 1766 r. 1750–1766	Marko c.1702 – ?
Petar I 1748 – 1830 r. 1784–1830	Tomislav c.1768 – ?	Stijepo c.1770 – ?
Petar II; 1813 – 1851 r. 1830–1851	Stanko; 1790 – 1851
Mirko; 1820 – 1867	Danilo I 1826 – 1860 r. 1851–1852 as Prince-Bishop r. 1852–1860 as Prince
Nicholas I 1841 – 1921 r. 1860–1910 as Prince r. 1910–1918 as King	House of Obrenović
Peter I 1844 – 1921; King of Serbia/Serbs, Croats, and Slovenes	Zorka of Montenegro; 1864 – 1890	Danilo; Crown Prince of Montenegro; 1871 – 1939	Elena of Montenegro; 1873 – 1952	Victor Emmanuel III; 1869 – 1947; King of Italy	Mirko of Montenegro; 1879 – 1918	Natalija Konstantinović; 1882 – 1950
Michael of Montenegro; 1908 – 1986
Nicholas of Montenegro b. 1944
