= Kostadinov =

Kostadinov (Bulgarian: Костадинов) may refer to:

- Aleksandar Kostadinov (born 1988), amateur Bulgarian Greco-Roman featherweight wrestler
- Alipi Kostadinov (born 1955), retired Czechoslovak cyclist, specialized in road racing
- Anton Kostadinov (born 1982), Bulgarian footballer currently playing as a midfielder
- Branimir Kostadinov (born 1989), Bulgarian footballer
- Dimitar Kostadinov (born 1999), Bulgarian footballer
- Emil Kostadinov (born 1967), Bulgarian former professional footballer
- Galin Kostadinov (born 1979), retired Bulgarian shot putter
- Georgi Kostadinov (born 1950), former boxer from Bulgaria
- Georgi Kostadinov (footballer) (born 1990), Bulgarian professional footballer
- Ivo Kostadinov (born 1969), Bulgarian judoka
- Kiko Kostadinov, Bulgarian fashion designer based in London
- Kostadin Kostadinov (born 1959), former Bulgarian footballer
- Kostadin Kostadinov (politician) (born 1979), Bulgarian politician, lawyer, historian, doctor of ethnography
- Martin Kostadinov (born 1996), Bulgarian professional footballer
- Miroslav Kostadinov (born 1976), Bulgarian singer and songwriter
- Petar Kostadinov (born 1978), former Bulgarian footballer
- Petar Kostadinov (water polo) (born 1954), Bulgarian water polo player
- Stefan Kostadinov (born 1984), Bulgarian footballer
- Tihomir Kostadinov (born 1996), Macedonian midfielder
- Tomi Kostadinov (born 1991), Bulgarian footballer

== See also ==
- Kostadin
- Kostadinovac
- Kostadinović
