= George, Crown Prince of Serbia =

George
- Crown Prince of Serbia
- Official portrait in 1908, aged 20–21
- Born: 27 August 1887; Cetinje Palace, Montenegro
- Died: 17 October 1972 (aged 85); Belgrade, SFR Yugoslavia
- Burial: Oplenac, Serbia
- Spouse: Radmila Radonjić (m. 1947)
- House: Karađorđević
- Father: Peter I of Serbia
- Mother: Ljubica of Montenegro
- Military career
- Allegiance: Kingdom of Serbia; Kingdom of Yugoslavia
- Service years: 1903–18 (active service)
- Rank: Lieutenant colonel (potpukovnik)
- Wars: Balkan Wars, World War I
- Awards: Gold Medal for Bravery (1912), "Miloš Obilić" Medal (1913)

Đorđe Karađorđević (Serbian: Ђорђе Карађорђевић; 1887–1972), known in English as George, was a Serbian prince and at first designated crown prince, a member of the Karađorđević dynasty as the eldest son of King Peter I of Serbia (r. 1903–1921) and the older brother of the succeeding king, Alexander I (r. 1921–1934).

After beating his servant who died from the injuries sustained therefrom, and the ensuing media circus, he gave up his claim to the throne in 1909. He distinguished himself in the Royal Serbian Army, fighting in the Balkan Wars and World War I in the 1910s. His brother, now king, had him interned, and he was diagnosed with schizophrenia. He remained in asylum for almost two decades, until released by the German Army upon their occupation of Yugoslavia in 1941. Germany wished to use him as their puppet, but he refused, and lived in peace at Beli Dvor during the war. He was the only member of the dynasty that was not sent into exile or declared enemy of the state by the Yugoslav Communists that won the war.

== Early life and background ==
George was born a member of the former dynasty of Serbia, the House of Karađorđević. His grandfather Alexander Karađorđević had ruled the Principality of Serbia during the period 1842–58 until he was deposed by the Popular Assembly. Prince Alexander and his family had to leave their homeland, and by the time of George's birth, they had been in exile for almost three decades. George was brought up on stories about Serb heroism, the Kosovo Myth, epic poetry, and verses of Njegoš.

George's father, Petar Karađorđević (the future King Peter I of Serbia), had made an advantageous marriage rather late in life with princess Ljubica (known as Zorka), the eldest daughter of King Nicholas I of Montenegro. After marrying the princess, he made his home in the Principality of Montenegro, and all his children were born there. Thus, George was born in Cetinje and spent the first few years of his life in the court of his maternal grandfather. He was one of five siblings, two of whom died in infancy; he therefore grew up with one older sister, Helen, and one younger brother, Alexander. George's birth motivated his father to work on returning to the Serbian throne.

In March 1890, when George was two years old, his mother died in childbirth. In 1894, Petar moved his family to a modest rented house in Geneva, in order to give the children a decent education. The family then moved briefly to Paris, where Petar himself was brought up, and after a few months George and Alexander were sent to military academies in the Russian Empire. George served in the Alexandrov Regiment, intended for the Russian nobility and bourgeois.

== Crown Prince ==
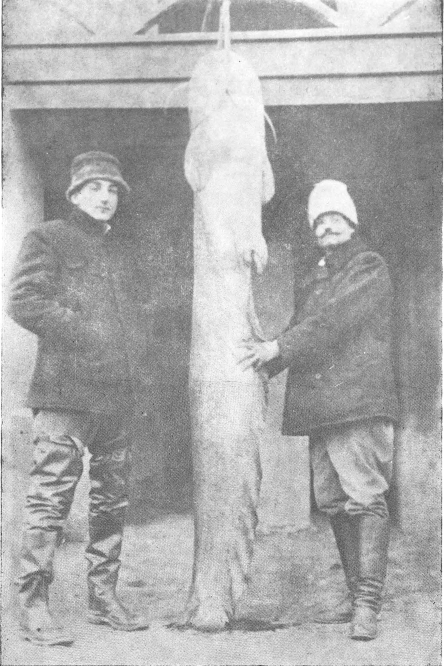
George and Mihailo Petrović Alas posing beside a big catch (1906)

The May Coup in 1903 saw the Obrenović dynasty overthrown in a palace coup orchestrated by conspiratory army officers (the root of the Black Hand). Petar moved to Serbia upon this, with George leaving the military academy. The Parliament chose Petar to rule and he was crowned King. George thus became the Crown Prince of Serbia, heir to the throne. The younger brother Alexander stayed in the military academy in Russia. George was tutored by mathematics professor Mihajlo Petrović-Alas, who became his close friend. He became known as extravagant and arrogant.

King Peter planned for George's future succession, but his lack of political talent, the Serbian political intrigue, and self-willed and spectacular behaviour led to annoyance in parts of the court- and political circle. He rode horse on the frozen Sava river and drove a new car fast on the Belgrade cobblestones. In January 1907 he survived a bomb explosion at his residence. There are diary entries of fellow young cadets wanting him dead as his future succession worried them, feeling they would lose influence and being worried about their own fate. Dragutin Dimitrijević-Apis worked as an aide to the Drina Division in 1908, and he was tasked by King Peter to accompany crown prince George on his six-weeks trip to Europe (Geneva and Italy); George was reluctant, but the two became friends. Upon his return to Belgrade, he was happy to hear that Nikola Pašić, who he felt was his greatest opponent, resigned and the Radicals led the government independently. His brother Alexander planned to study in Russia, and George hoped that Petar Živković, Alexander's close associate, also left with him as he was "increasingly less inclined to see him at the court and by Alexander's side". Apis (at the head of the conspiratory officer group) became very influential, and the Radicals feared his political (and revolutionary) ambitions.

The Annexation Crisis (1908), when Austria-Hungary annexed the province of Bosnia and Herzegovina, led to a huge revolt throughout Serbian society as the province was considered Serb. The International powers put pressure on Serbia to accept the annexation, and thus, the king and government of Stojan Novaković sent the political strongman Nikola Pašić and the crown prince to Russia in October–December 1908. Tsar Nicholas II and Foreign Minister Izvolsky had all understanding for the Serbian discontent, but demanded that Serbia accept the annexation, as the Crisis according to them could not be solved without war. At the time, Austria-Hungary feared for the potential of having George succeed as king, as he was seen as openly nationalistic. George held fiery speeches in front of 20,000 demonstrators in Belgrade and burned the Austro-Hungarian flag. In Serbia, and outside, the question of the royal succession, whether George should be replaced with his younger brother Alexander, was posed. When the Serbian political leadership and king himself withdrew from fighting the annexation politically, George supported war, even if Serbia would fight alone. There was a conflict between officer group and George during the crisis. According to many historians, King Peter was a puppet in the hands of the officers (what became the Black Hand), whom George openly told that he would break the neck of as soon as the came to power. George gained sympathy among the people but his opponents determined he was unfit for rule due to his tactlessness and lack of political thinking. He had an outburst at the Russian embassy on the Tsar's birthday where he called the Russian ruler a liar for promising but not helping Serbia, and to the Austro-Hungarian envoy that their monarch was a thief that stole other people's lands. The media reported on George's outbursts and endeavours, which gave more reason to intrigue. A French envoy reported that the crown prince was surrounded by Austrian spies. Both Apis and Pašić supported the removal of George, as they thought Alexander would be easier to control. Apis' officer group became impatient with George and talked about having him poisoned, but nothing serious came of it. While George's trip to Russia was seen positively, his remarks were seen as a real problem, and the officer group told Stojan Novaković that they would not stand by George and wanted him removed.

At the beginning of 1909, George became angry with his servant Stevan Kolaković (allegedly for not delivering a love letter), and hit him (kicking him in the stomach), leaving him with two critical hernias that resulted in his death shortly after. This was a huge scandal in Serbian media, and Austro-Hungarian media reported on it intensively. George was pressured to abdicate, but still, King Petar wanted him to succeed the Serbian throne. In March 1909, George officially abdicated in favour of his younger brother Alexander. Miroslav Spalajković, a counsellor in the Internal Affairs, as well as the journalist Živojin Protić-Ajfel, talked George into renouncing the throne. After this, he was often used as a tool by various political and military circles to put pressure on the new heir (and eventual regent) Alexander. Alexander worked with both officer groups, under Apis and Živković, respectively; this showed good political manoeuvring as it prevented their excessive strengthening. Apis became close with Alexander. There was a rift between the brothers. In 1910, Alexander was sick with typhus, and there were rumours that Apis' group planned a coup if George was to succeed in his place. Živković kept defaming Apis, and Alexander had a falling out with Apis in 1911 when the potential of a coup became clearer to him. While Apis suggested to King Peter to give over the throne to his son Alexander in February 1911, Peter refused, until mid-1914, at the beginning of World War I.

== Balkan Wars and World War I ==
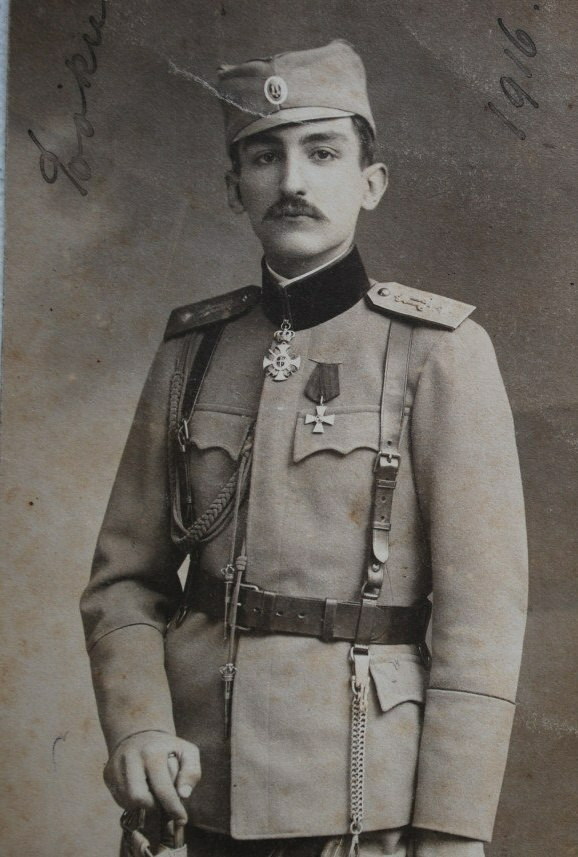
Prince George in 1916

George participated in the Balkan Wars (1912–1914) as well as World War I. His brother, now regent, refused to give George commanding positions and George thus registered as an ordinary soldier. He was wounded at the Battle of Mačkov Kamen in 1914. After his recovery, his brother refused him back into the army, perhaps out of jealousy, and he then spent time in France but longed to be back at the Balkan front. He went to Thessaloniki for a while, where he tried to prevent his brother from dealing with the Black Hand and their leader Dragutin Dimitrijević-Apis, but this only drew further anger from his brother. After the war, the media reported on the disagreements between the brothers, and the new opposition in the newly created Kingdom of Yugoslavia fueled this in an attempt to destabilize the country.

== Interwar period ==
George lived mostly in France until 1921. The brothers briefly reconciled in 1922, and George started to claim his royal membership rights to an appanage, a car, and house. Alexander decided for George to live outside Belgrade, in Niš in southern Serbia, but George refused. As he felt his demands were not met, he printed defamatory leaflets that he had handed out around the country. King Alexander was devastated, and also, alarmed that this would add to the turbulence in Yugoslav society; in 1925, George was settled by Alexander and the government at the royal estate of Belje Castle in Baranja, where doctors stayed for 10 days and concluded his behaviour was paranoid and dangerous, and he needed to be isolated. After a year, in 1926, he was moved to the Toponica asylum near Niš. In 1927 psychiatrists concluded that he had schizophrenia. The neuro-psychiatrist Uroš Jekić later acknowledged that George was not mentally ill, but that this had been a "political diagnosis".

== World War II and post-war life ==
George stayed at Toponica until 1941 and the occupation of Yugoslavia, when he was released by the Germans and offered the Serbian throne, which he refused. He was the only of the male Karađorđević that were left by the Communist government to stay in Yugoslavia. He lived a peaceful life in Belgrade, and in 1947 married Radmila Radonjić (1907–1993). His wife belonged to an old and prominent Radonjić noble family of Njeguši, which held the hereditary title of Guvernadur (Governor) of Montenegro, originally granted to them by the Republic of Venice in 1756, and stood for centuries as the primary political rivals to the ruling Petrović-Njegoš dynasty.

== Death ==
George died at age 85, on 17 October 1972 in Belgrade and was buried in St. George's Church in Topola. His death came the day after the tenth anniversary of the death of his sister Helen.

== Memoirs ==
He wrote his memoirs Istina o mom životu (Truth About my Life) and was widely sold in Yugoslavia as it exposed the weaknesses of the Karađorđević dynasty.

== Ancestry ==
Ancestors of George, Crown Prince of Serbia

8. Karađorđe Petrović, Grand Vozhd of Serbia
4. Alexander I, Prince of Serbia
9. Jelena Jovanović
2. Peter I of Serbia
10. Voivode Jevrem Nenadović
5. Persida Nenadović
11. Jovanka Milovanović
1. George, Crown Prince of Serbia
12. Mirko Petrović-Njegoš, Grand Voivode of Grahovo
6. Nicholas I of Montenegro
13. Anastasija Martinović
3. Princess Ljubica of Montenegro
14. Voivode Petar Vukotić
7. Milena Vukotić
15. Jelena Vojvodić

== Sources ==
- Balaban, Milovan (13 December 2017), Принц Ђорђе Карађорђевић – сенка над Србијом, KCNS
- Jeremić, Strahinja (2017). "Dragutin Dimitrijević Apis i Karađorđevići" [Dragutin Dimitrijević Apis and Karađorđević dynasty (the May Revolution of 1903 to the Thessaloniki Process of 1917)]. Vojno delo.
- Karađorđević, Đorđe (1969). Istina o mome životu [The truth about my life]. Prosveta.
- Škodrić, Ljubinka (2023). "PRINC ĐORĐE KARAĐORĐEVIĆ U OKUPIRANOJ SRBIJI 1941–1944". Istorija 20. veka. 2: 361–386.
