= Vukotić =

Vukotić (Serbian Cyrillic: Вукотић, pronounced [ʋǔkotitɕ]) is a Montenegrin surname, derived from the male given name "Vukota". It may refer to:

- Aleksandar Vukotić (born 1995), Serbian footballer
- Bisera Vukotić (born 1944), Yugoslav-born Italian film actress and producer
- Dušan Vukotić (1927–1998), Yugoslav cartoonist, author and director of animated films
- Dubravka Vukotić (born 1976), Montenegrin actress
- Ilija Vukotić (born 1999), Montenegrin footballer
- Janko Vukotić (1866–1927), Montenegrin General and Vojvoda from Montenegro
- Princess Milena Vukotić (1847–1923), Queen Consort of Montenegro as the wife of King Nicholas I of Montenegro
- Milan Vukotić (born 2002), Montenegrin footballer
- Milena Vukotic (born 1938), Italian ballerina and actress
- Miodrag Vukotić (born 1973), retired Montenegrin football player
- Momčilo Vukotić (born 1950), Serbian football manager and a former football player
- Rade Vukotić (born 1982), Montenegrin footballer
- Veselin Vukotić, Montenegrin criminal and hitman
