= George Karageorgevich =

George Karageorgevich (Serbian: Ђорђе Карађорђевић / Đorđe Karađorđević) may refer to:

- Prince George of Serbia (1827–1884)
- George, Crown Prince of Serbia (1887–1972)
- Prince George of Yugoslavia (born 1984), son of Prince Tomislav of Yugoslavia
