= Princess Helen of Serbia =

Helen of Serbia
- Princess Elena Petrovna of Russia
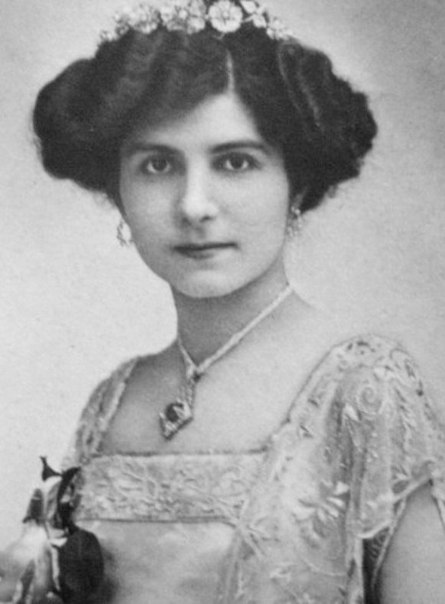
- Born: 4 November 1884; Cetinje Royal Palace, Cetinje, Montenegro
- Died: 16 October 1962 (aged 77); Nice, France
- Burial: Cimetière orthodoxe de Caucade, Nice, France
- Spouse: Prince John Constantinovich of Russia (m. 1911; died 1918)
- Issue: Prince Vsevolod Ivanovich; Princess Catherine Ivanovna
Names
- Jelena Karađorđević
- House: Karađorđević
- Father: Peter I of Serbia
- Mother: Ljubica of Montenegro

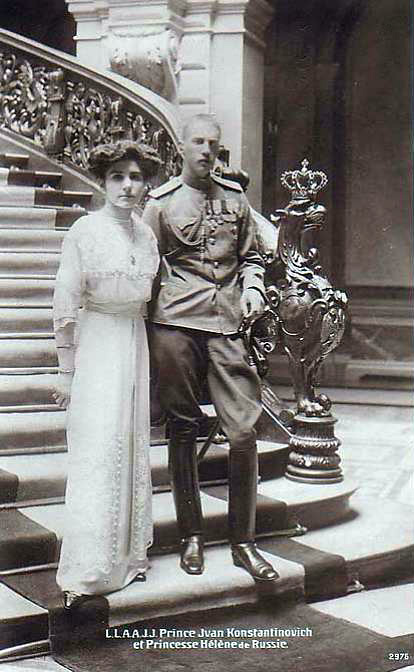
Engagement photograph: Princess Elena Petrovna and Prince Ioann Konstantinovich in Old palace

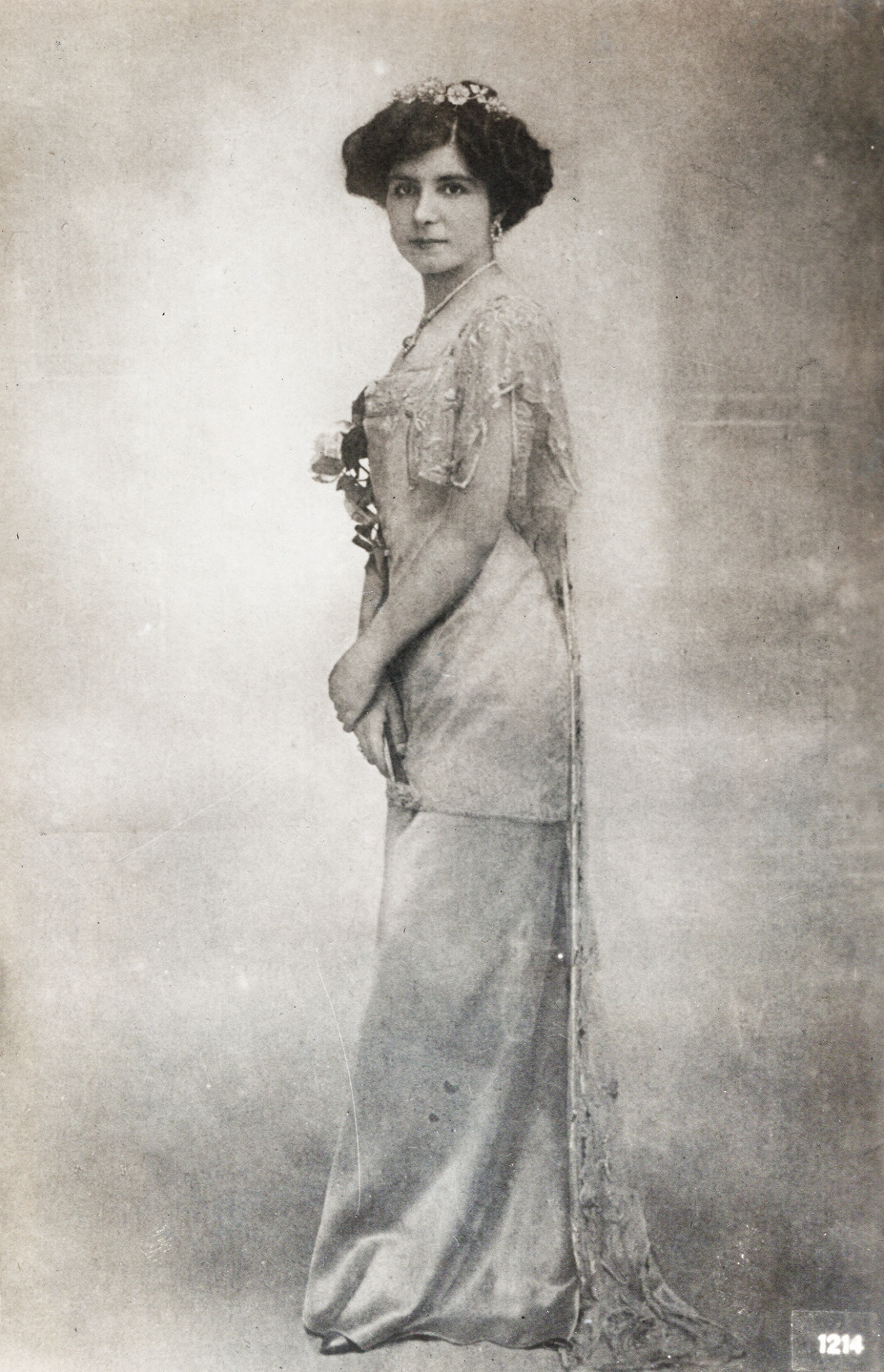
Princess Helen in 1911

Princess Helen of Serbia (4 November [O.S. 23 October] 1884 – 16 October 1962) was a Serbian princess. She was the daughter of King Peter I of Serbia and his wife, the former Princess Ljubica of Montenegro. She was the elder sister of George, Crown Prince of Serbia and King Alexander I of Yugoslavia. Helen was also a niece of Queen Elena of Italy, Princess Anastasia of Montenegro (or "Stana"), wife of Grand Duke Nicholas Nikolaevich of Russia and of Princess Milica of Montenegro, wife of Grand Duke Peter Nikolaevich of Russia, the women who introduced Grigori Rasputin to Tsarina Alexandra.

== Early life ==
The strong-minded, purposeful Helen, whose mother died when she was a small child, was born in Cetinje, Montenegro, and was brought up largely under the care of her aunts Stana and Milica. She was educated in Russia at the Smolny Institute, a school in St. Petersburg for well-born girls. "She was a very sweet-faced though plain girl, with beautiful dark eyes, very quiet and amiable in manner," wrote Margaretta Eagar, governess to the daughters of Tsar Nicholas II. Eagar wrote that Helen, then about seventeen, often came to tea with another of her aunts, Princess Vjera of Montenegro, and cousins. Young Grand Duchess Olga Nikolaevna of Russia was very fond of her.

== Engagement and marriage ==
During her youth, Serbian political circles viewed a potential marriage between her and King Alexander I Obrenović as the ideal way to reconcile the two rivaling dynasties, the House of Obrenović with the House of Karadjordjević. There had been other plans, arranged by her aunt Queen Elena of Italy, for Princess Helen to marry Prince Vittorio Emanuele of Savoy-Aosta, Count of Turin, a cousin of Queen Elena's husband, King Victor Emmanuel III, but the union never took place.

Instead, her aunt, Queen Elena, invited her to Italy with other plans in mind and, with the prior approval of his parents, introduced her to the pious and shy young man, Prince John Constantinovich of Russia. The Prince instantly fell in love and proposed marriage during the visit. It was a love match, a surprise to the family because the gentle, introverted John had thought of becoming a Russian Orthodox monk. "Perhaps you know that Ioanchik is engaged to Helene of Serbia, it is so touching," wrote his distant cousin, 14-year-old Grand Duchess Tatiana Nikolaevna of Russia, to her aunt, Grand Duchess Olga Alexandrovna of Russia, on 14 July 1911. "How funny if they might have children, can they be kissing him? What foul, fie!" The couple married on 3 September 1911, at the Saints Peter and Paul Chapel of the Peterhof Palace in Saint Petersburg. After the marriage, she retained her style of Royal Highness, which meant that she had the right to receive diplomats in her own right, unlike her husband, who held only the His Highness status, lower in rank than hers, due to being male-line great-grandson of an Emperor.

Helen studied medicine at the Saint Petersburg Imperial University following their marriage, a career pursuit she had to give up when she gave birth to her first child. The couple had two children, Prince Vsevelod Ivanovich of Russia (20 January 1914 – 18 June 1973), and Princess Catherine Ivanovna of Russia (Pavlovsk 12 July 1915 - Montevideo, Uruguay 14 July 2007). The three children and seven grandchildren of her daughter Princess Catherine, who married and later separated from Marchese Farace di Villaforesta, are the only great-grandchildren of Grand Duke Constantine Constantinovich of Russia and his wife Grand Duchess Elizabeth Mavrikievna.

== Revolution ==
Helen voluntarily followed her husband into exile when he was arrested following the Russian Revolution of 1917 and tried to obtain his release. John was imprisoned first at Yekaterinburg, Siberia and later moved to Alapaevsk, a town in Sverdlovsk Oblast by the Bolsheviks, where he would be murdered on 18 July 1918 along with Grand Duchess Elizabeth Feodorovna, Grand Duke Sergei Mikhailovich; John's brothers Prince Constantine Constantinovich and Prince Igor Constantinovich, his distant cousin Prince Vladimir Pavlovich Paley; Grand Duke Sergei's secretary, Fyodor Remez; and Varvara Yakovleva, a sister from the Grand Duchess Elizabeth's convent. They were herded into the forest by the local Bolsheviks, pushed into an abandoned mineshaft and grenades were then hurled into the mineshaft.

== Imprisonment ==
John had persuaded Helen to leave Alapaevsk and go back to their two young children, whom she had left with John's mother, Grand Duchess Elizabeth Mavrikievna of Russia. In June 1918, Helen visited the Ipatiev House and demanded to see the tsar, secretly hoping to pass on letters to the imperial family from their relatives. After being refused entry by the guards (who had their rifles aimed at her), she went to the Amerikanskaya Hotel half a mile away, making repeated enquiries to the Cheka. She was herself arrested by the secret police and imprisoned in Perm. The following month, in July 1918, her husband John and several other captive members of the imperial family were killed by the Bolsheviks.

During her imprisonment, the Bolsheviks brought a girl who called herself Anastasia Romanova to her cell and asked Helen if the girl was Grand Duchess Anastasia Nikolaevna of Russia, the daughter of Tsar Nicholas II. Helen said she did not recognize the girl and the guards took her away. Two weeks later, Helen was put on a train back to Petrograd.

== Exile ==
Swedish diplomats obtained permission for Helen's mother-in-law Grand Duchess Elizabeth Mavrikievna to leave Russia with Helen's children, Vsevelod and Catherine, and her own two younger children, Prince George Constantinovich and Princess Vera Constantinovna, in October 1918 aboard the Swedish ship Ångermanland. Helen remained imprisoned at Perm until Norwegian diplomats located her and had her transferred. She was then kept prisoner at the Kremlin Palace before finally being allowed to leave and join her children in Sweden. Helen returned to Yugoslavia, but following the death of her father in 1921 and due to disagreements with her brother King Alexander, primarily over the treatment of their brother Prince George (arrested, declared insane, and locked in an asylum in 1925), she eventually left and settled in the French Riviera.

In her capacity as a Royal Highness, Princess Helen received a regular allowance from the royal court in Belgrade. For example, according to court records, on 5 March 1924, she was paid 24,500 francs as part of her annual apanage. Additionally, a portion of her personal funds had been successfully transferred out of Soviet Russia. In a letter to the Kingdom of Serbs, Croats and Slovenes' diplomatic mission in Bern, the royal court reported that 10,000 Swiss francs in gold had been deposited in the Federal Bank of Bern to Princess Helen Petrovna's account. This sum had been transferred from Petrograd by the Kingdom's envoy, Miroslav Spalajković, who informed the court in Belgrade, which in turn notified the diplomatic mission in Bern, Switzerland.

Beyond these sources, she had other forms of income. According to a report from the National Bank of the Kingdom of Serbs, Croats and Slovenes dated 15 June 1920, Princess Helen also received interest payments from government bonds issued in 1909, yielding 4.5%. She also owned shares in banks based in Belgrade, some of which had been gifted to her by her brother, King Alexander. In addition, she received a portion of her inheritance from her father, which further contributed to her financial independence.

These sources of income enabled her to enjoy a comfortable and luxurious lifestyle during her years on the French Riviera. There, Princess Helen lived with her family in Villa Trianon (today Villa Aréthuse‑Trianon) in Cap Ferrat.

In the same area, in Cannes, another member of the Karadjordjević dynasty, Princess Daria, resided in her Villa Fiorentina. However, there are no indications that the two princesses ever met there — perhaps a consequence of the complicated relations between the two branches of the family to which they belonged.

After 1945, with the dissolution of the Kingdom of Yugoslavia, Helen no longer received her royal allowance, and by 1953, having spent nearly all of her resources, she was forced to leave the villa and move into more modest accommodations. In the years that followed, Villa Trianon would become the French residence of the King of Laos.

With her finances completely depleted and no source of income, she was eventually compelled to leave even that modest dwelling, where she had spent six years, and rent a single room in the village of Èze, near Nice, where she lived out the remainder of her life.

Proud and resolutely private, she refused to see anyone or allow visitors, determined that no one should witness her in such a state. As her nephew, Prince Tomislav of Yugoslavia, whom she affectionately nicknamed Tommy, described — she even turned him away when he visited the Côte d’Azur — "she possessed a kind of fatal pride, unwavering to the point of self-destruction, a pride found only in the most refined, determined noble souls".

Throughout her life, she seemed haunted by the words of her brother, Prince George, who, during her time in Russia, described her difficult and courageous struggle for survival with the remark: “Misfortune, my Helen, cannot simply be cast off like an old garment.” He also often said that she carried within her both “good fortune and misfortune,” which followed her throughout her life.

According to contemporaries, she closely resembled her mother, Princess Zorka, both in physical appearance and in character. She was generally considered to have taken more after the Petrović-Njegoš family than her paternal Karađorđević dynasty. During her life in exile, she avoided all social contact, shunning both friends and strangers alike, fleeing everything that reminded her of the normal life she believed was no longer hers to live. She fled not only from sorrow, but from joy as well.

After leaving Belgrade in 1921, she returned to her homeland only once—to attend the reading of her father's will in 1922. She chose not to be present at King Alexander's wedding in 1922, the birth of King Peter II and Prince Paul's wedding in 1923, the funeral of her brother following the assassination in Marseille in 1934, nor the burial of her uncle Prince Arsen in 1938, with whom she had shared years of life in Russia and to whom she had been closest.

She did not attend any of her children's weddings — neither her son Vsevolod's, nor her daughter Ekaterina's. The only, and last, grand ceremony she ever attended was the baptism of Alexander, Crown Prince of Yugoslavia, the son of her nephew King Peter II, in London in 1945.

After leaving Russia, she never remarried and never desired a permanent home, choosing instead to live exclusively in rented accommodations, firmly believing she would not settle anywhere without her late husband, Prince John, by her side. For many years, Princess Helen wrote her memoirs — titled I Was in Yekaterinburg and covering the events of 1917–1918 — in French. Having remained steadfastly loyal to the family of Tsar Nicholas II, to whom she was closely related, she was among the last witnesses — and the last of the Imperial family members — to their suffering during their captivity in Yekaterinburg. In 2024–2025, these memoirs were fully compiled, translated into Russian, and published, with commentary and illustrations, based on the typewritten manuscript held in the Hoover Institution archives (USA).

== Death ==
Princess Helen of Russia died on 16 October 1962 in Nice, France, aged 77, outliving her husband by 44 years. Her body was buried at the Russian Orthodox Cemetery, Nice, France, while her husband was initially buried in Orthodox church in Beijing, China. Later, his remains, along with those of other members of the House of Romanov who were killed with him, were transferred to Jerusalem, where they remain to this day.
