= Princess Vjera of Montenegro =

Montenegrin royal (1887–1927)

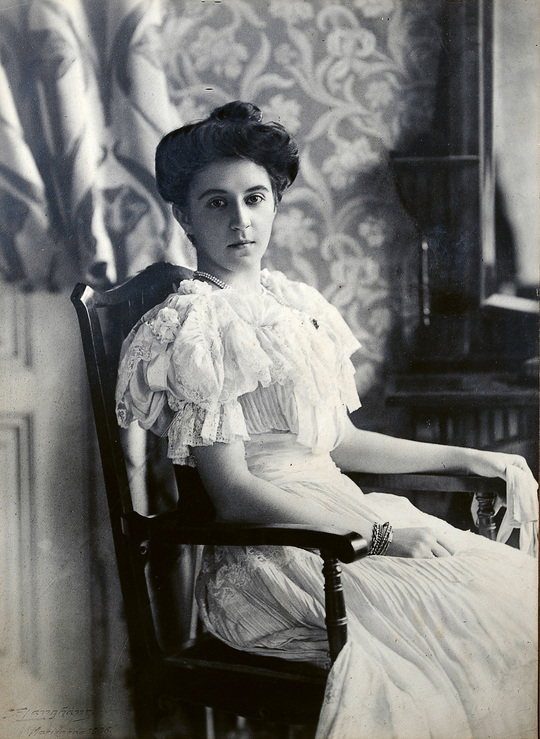
- Photo of Princess Vjera of Montenegro, taken in 1906
- Born: 22 February 1887; Rijeka Crnojevića, Montenegro
- Died: 31 October 1927 (aged 40); Cap d'Antibes, France
- Burial: Court Church, Cetinje
Names
- Vjera Petrović-Njegoš, Princess of Montenegro
- House: Petrović-Njegoš
- Father: Nicholas I of Montenegro
- Mother: Milena of Montenegro
- Religion: Orthodox

Vjera Petrović-Njegoš, Princess of Montenegro (Serbian Cyrillic: Вјера Петровић-Његош; 22 February 1887 – 31 October 1927) was a Princess of Montenegro.

== Early life and ancestry ==
Vjera (Vera) was born as the ninth daughter and eleventh (of twelve) child of Nicholas I of Montenegro and his wife, Milena of Montenegro. By birth, she was member of the House of Petrović-Njegoš, ruling family of the Kingdom of Montenegro since 1697.

== Biography ==
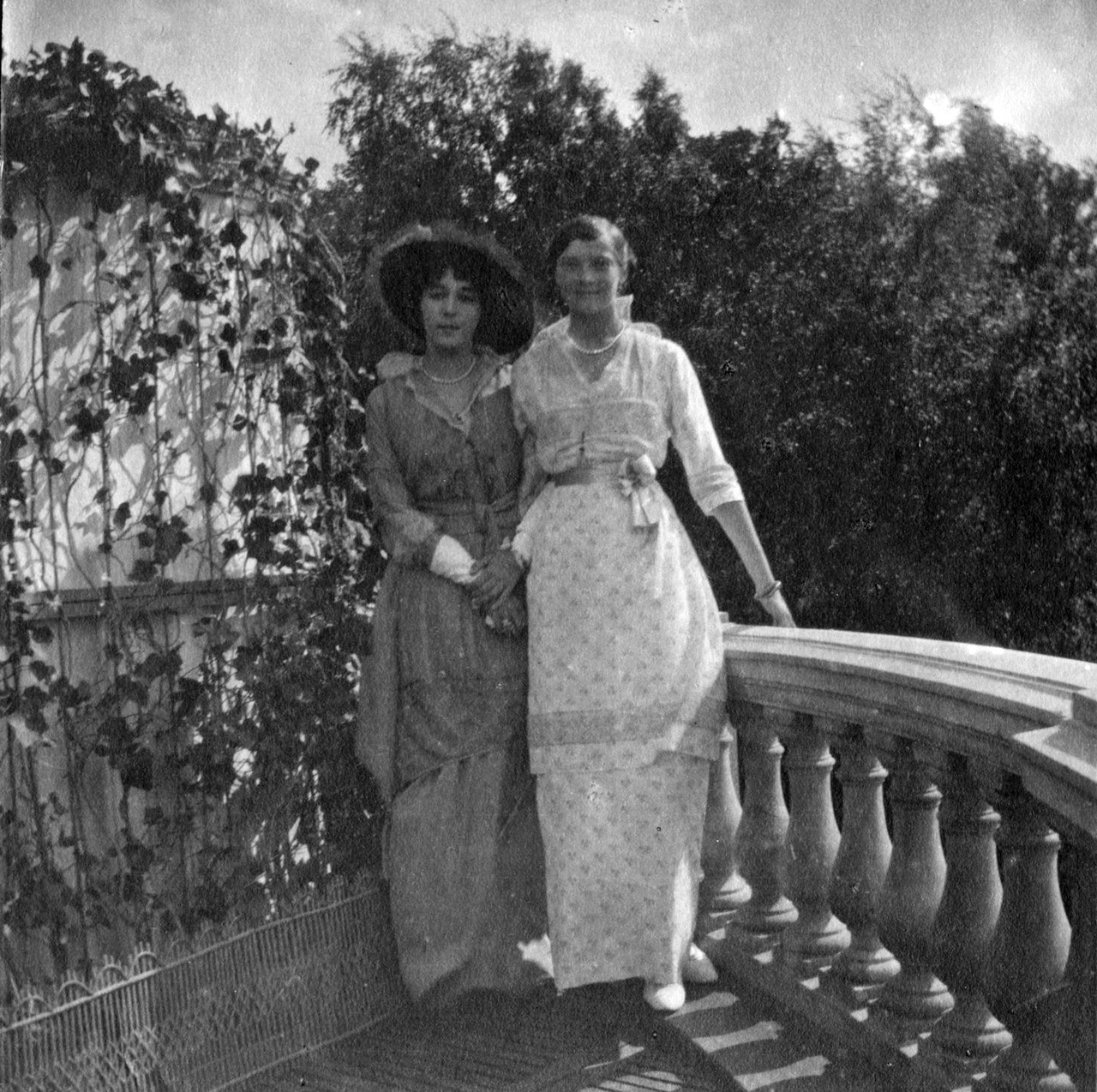
Photo of Princess Vera with Grand Duchess Tatiana Nikolaevna of Russia, taken at Lower Dacha in Peterhof Palace on 15 July 1914

Vjera and her sister Princess Xenia were not educated at the Smolny Institute in Russia like her eldest sisters had been, but educated at home. She was described as pretty and elegant, but more sensitive and timid, and not as energetic or strong-willed, like her elder sisters.

She was interested in painting, but is foremost remembered because of the effort she made helping the injured victims of an explosion in the harbor of Bar, for which she was awarded a medal. She left Montenegro when her father was deposed in 1918 and settled with her parents and her sister Xenia in France. She participated in humanitarian work in France as well. As young girls, Vjera's father had high hopes that she and her elder sister Xenia would marry some of the extended members of the Russian Imperial family. But, she decided to never marry.

== Death ==
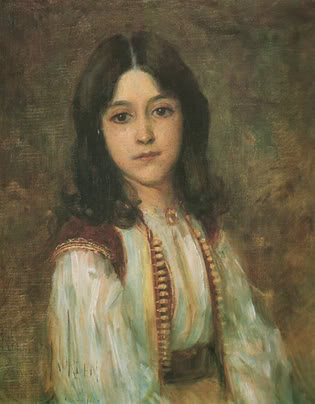
Portrait of Princess Vjera of Montenegro by Vlaho Bukovac , 1897

She died while in exile, on 31 October 1927 in Cap d'Antibes, France. She was buried with her parents and sister in Sanremo, Italy, but like them, her remains were reburied in the Cetinje Monastery in 1989.

== Ancestry ==
Ancestors of Princess Vjera of Montenegro

8. Serdar Stanko Petrović-Njegoš
4. Mirko Petrović-Njegoš, Grand Voivode of Grahovo
9. Krstinja Vrbica
2. Nicholas I of Montenegro
10. Voivode Drago Martinović
5. Anastasija Martinović
11. Anastasija Ludović
1. Princess Vjera of Montenegro
12. Serdar Petar Perkov Vukotić
6. Voivode Petar Vukotić
13. Anastasija Milić
3. Milena Vukotić
14. Tadija Vojvodić
7. Jelena Vojvodić
15. Milica Pavićević

== Notes ==
1. Her given name is sometimes spelled in the ekavian version Vera; both vera and vjera means "faith" in South Slavic languages.
