= George, Prince of Serbia =

George, Prince of Serbia may refer to:

- George Branković, Prince of Serbia, ruled as prince (1427–1429) and despot (1429–1456)
- George, Crown Prince of Serbia (b. 1887 – d. 1972), crown prince of Serbia from 1903 to 1909

== See also ==
- Prince of Serbia
