= Milena of Montenegro =

Princess/Queen of Montenegro from 1860 to 1918

Milena Vukotić
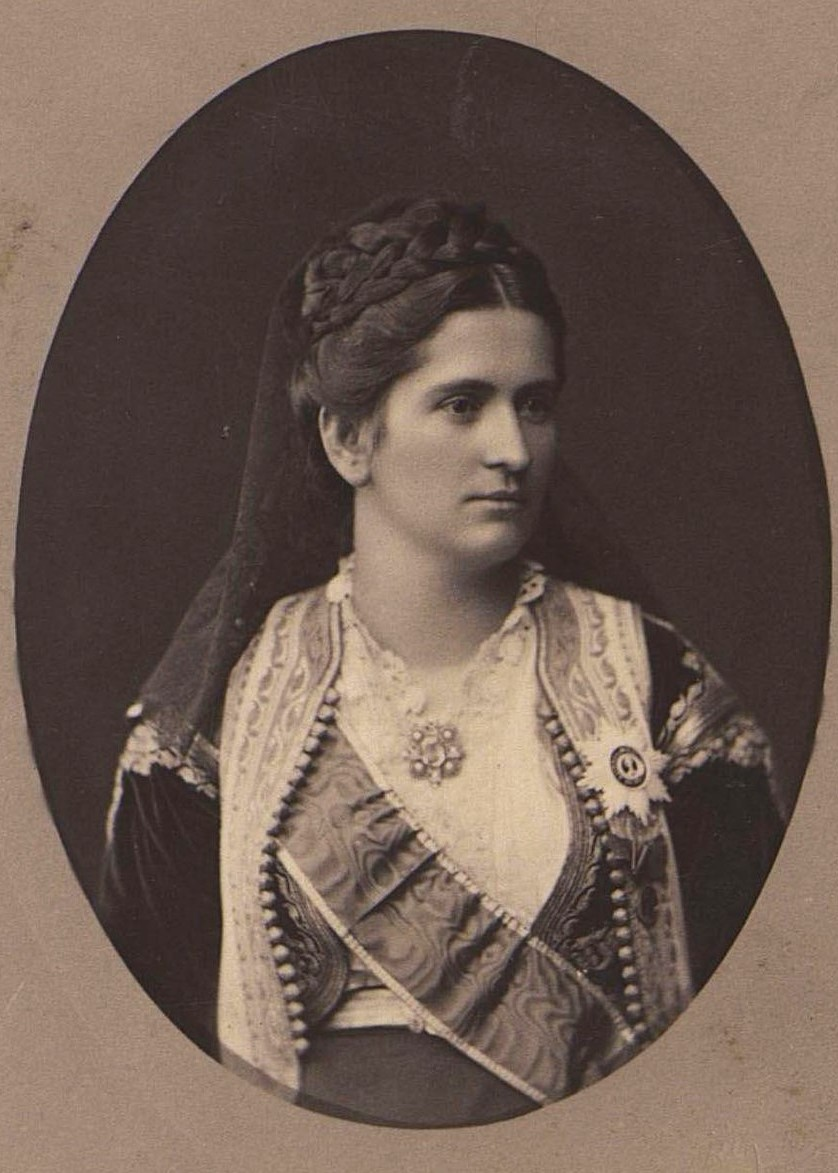
- Milena as a Princess consort

Queen consort of Montenegro
- Tenure: 28 August 1910 – 26 November 1918

Princess consort of Montenegro
- Tenure: 8 November 1860 – 28 August 1910
- Born: Milena Vukotić; 4 May 1847; Čevo, Cetinje, Montenegro
- Died: 16 March 1923 (aged 75); Cap d'Antibes, France
- Burial: Court Church, Cetinje
- Spouse: Nicholas I of Montenegro (m. 1860; died 1921)
- Issue: List: Ljubica, Princess Peter Karađorđević; Grand Duchess Militza Nikolaevna of Russia; Grand Duchess Anastasia Nikolaevna of Russia; Princess Marica; Danilo, Crown Prince of Montenegro; Elena, Queen of Italy; Anna, Princess Francis Joseph of Battenberg; Princess Sofia; Prince Mirko; Princess Xenia; Princess Vjera; Prince Peter
Names
- Milena Petrović-Njegoš
- House: Petrović-Njegoš (by marriage)
- Father: Voivode Petar Vukotić
- Mother: Jelena Vojvodić
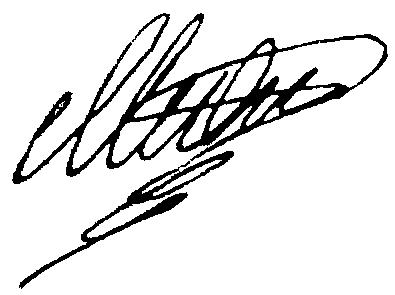
- Signature

Milena Petrović-Njegoš (née Vukotić; Serbian Cyrillic: Милена Петровић-Његош; 4 May 1847 – 16 March 1923) was the only Queen of Montenegro by marriage to Nicholas I of Montenegro.

Milena was regent of Montenegro during the absence of her spouse in 1869 and in 1883. She also served as titular regent for the king-in-exile, Michael, Prince of Montenegro, from 1922 to 1923.

== Early life ==
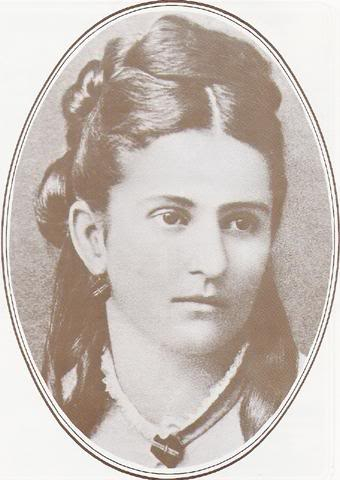
Photo of young Princess Milena of Montenegro (1870s)

Born in the Montenegrin village of Čevo, Milena was a daughter of Voivode Petar Vukotić and his wife, Jelena Vojvodić, born in Viš, Danilovgrad.

Her father was one of the greatest landowners in Montenegro and a close friend of Voivode Mirko Petrović-Njegoš with whom he had fought in the wars of the 1850s. The two friends decided to consolidate their alliance with the union of their children. In 1853, Milena, age only six, was betrothed to Mirkos's only son, Nikola, age twelve. Nikola was the nephew and heir of then childless ruling prince of Montenegro Danilo I.

In 1856, after the death of her mother, Milena was sent to Cetinje, to be raised in the household of her future in laws. Having grown up according to the rudimentary customs of Montenegro at that time even in prominent families, Milena was illiterate. Between 1856 and 1860 she grew up in the household of Mirko Njegoš, her soon to be father in law, raised alongside Mirko's daughter, Anastasia. During those four years she became close to her new family:

"My father and mother loved her as their own daughter" wrote later King Nikola. "My late uncle (Prince Danilo), also loved her greatly and treated her as his own child, and she showed him her love and respect in every way. She was very beautiful, sweet, kind, gentle and devout."

In those years Milena seldom saw her future husband. Six years her senior, Nikola meanwhile was educated first in Trieste and later in Paris.

== Princess and queen consort ==
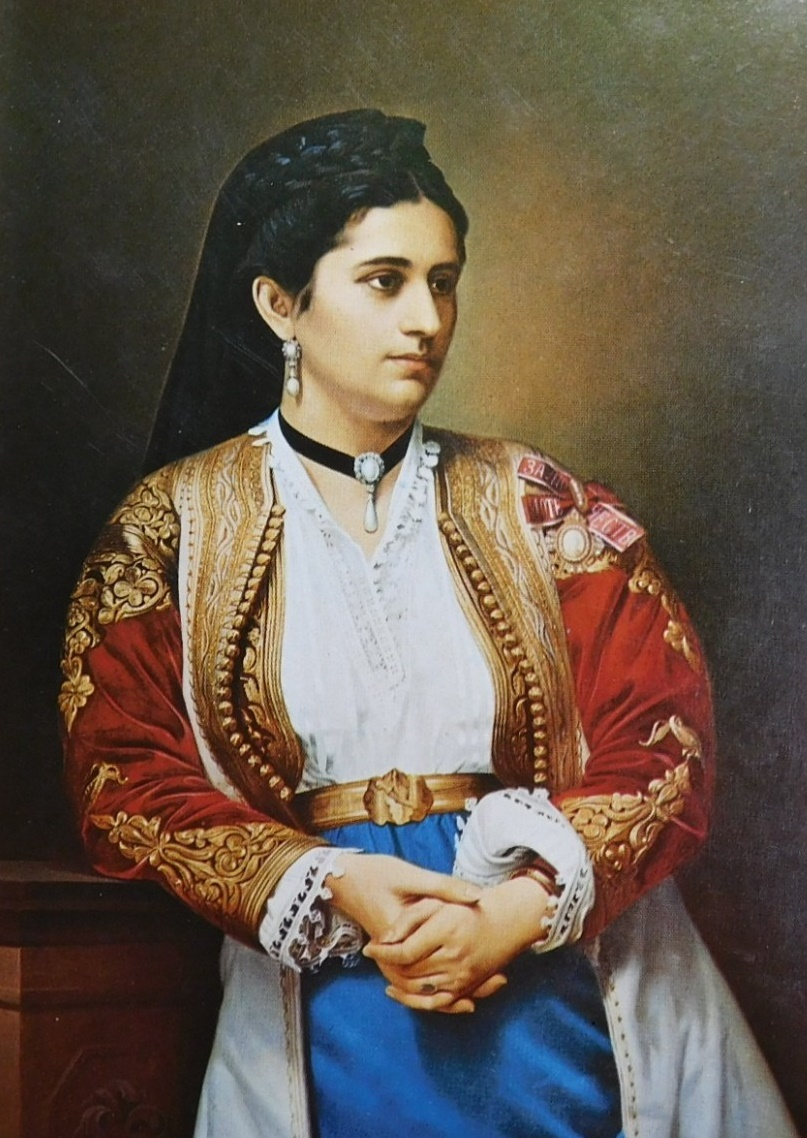
Milena, painted in the national costume of Montenegro

The assassination of Prince Danilo, on 12 August 1860, unexpectedly made Nikola the reigning prince of Montenegro at age eighteen. Shortly after, Nikola was close to death ill with pneumonia. When he recovered, it was decided to arrange his marriage as soon as possible in order to provide Montenegro with an heir. Milena's father traveled to St Petersburg and informed Tsar Alexander II of Russia, Montenegro's greatest ally and supporter, of the marriage.

In Cetinje, on 8 November 1860, at the age of 13, Milena married Prince Nicholas I of Montenegro, then aged 19, who later became King in 1910. The wedding was a simple affair and was held in the Vlach Church in Lovćen valley. The marriage was political: her family had played an important role in Montenegin politics and was befriended with the House of Petrović-Njegoš, her husband's family.

Only in her early teens at the time of her marriage, Milena's early years as Princess consort were difficult. She was inexperienced and was a solitary figure initially overshadowed by Princess Darinka, widow of Prince Danilo, who was close to Nikola. During the first four years of her marriage, she did not have any children. She was tutored in the Serbian language and learned French.

Milena asserted her position after Darinka left Montenegro for good in 1867. In 1865, Milena gave birth to the first of her twelve children. Between 1865 and 1869, she had four daughters in quick succession, with a son and heir, Prince Danilo, born in 1871, and seven more children would follow. Milena's relationship with her husband solidified with time and she became respected and influential.

While her husband was away in visits to Austria-Hungary and Russia in the winter of 1868–1869, Milena was in charge of court affairs.

She was appointed regent when Nicholas visited Russia in 1869. She also served as regent during Nicholas' visit to Constantinople in 1883.

She had visited Istanbul with her husband Prince Nikola I Petrović-Njegoš after the invitation of Sultan Abdulhamid in 1899. She was one of the foreigners who had the opportunity to visit the Sultan's Harem-i Hümayun and to meet with the sultan's family.

== Later life and death ==
After the annexation of Montenegro by the Kingdom of Serbia in 1918, the royal family was forced into exile. Milena and Nicholas settled in France with their two youngest daughters. Nicholas died in 1921, leaving the title of king-in-exile to his son Danilo, who however renounced it to his nephew Michael. Michael was placed under the regency of Milena, who acted as titular regent of the titular king from 1922 to her own death in 1923. Milena died in France, two years after her husband, and was buried in San Remo, Italy. In 1989 her remains, together with her husband's and Xenia's and Vera's, two of her daughters, were transferred to Cetinje and reburied in the Church in Ćipur.

== Issue ==
Nicholas I and Milena had twelve children: three sons and nine daughters, some of whom married other members of European royalty. Because of their children's marriages, Nicholas was nicknamed the "father-in-law of Europe".

- Princess Ljubica, known as Zorka (Cetinje, Montenegro, December 23, 1864 – Cetinje, March 28, 1890) married Prince Petar Karađorđević (who after her death would become King Peter I, King of the Serbs, Croats, and Slovenes, which became Yugoslavia, annexing Montenegro from Nikola himself);
- Princess Milica (Cetinje, Montenegro, July 26, 1866 – Alexandria, Egypt, September 5, 1951) was married to Grand Duke Peter Nicolaievich of Russia, brother of Grand Duke Nicholas Nicolaevich;
- Princess Anastasija (Cetinje, Montenegro, January 4, 1868 – Antibes, France, November 15, 1935) (also known as Princess Stana) was married first with George, Duke of Leuchtenberg and after divorce secondly to the World War I general Grand Duke Nicholas Nicolaevich of Russia, the younger; both her husbands were grandsons of Emperor Nicholas I and she had two children by her first marriage;
- Princess Marija (Cetinje, Montenegro, March 29, 1869 – St. Petersburg, Russia, May 7, 1885);
- Crown Prince Danilo Alexander (Cetinje, Montenegro, June 29, 1871 – Vienna, Austria, September 24, 1939) married Duchess Augusta Charlotte Jutta of Mecklenburg-Strelitz, after received Orthodox faith became Milica, they had no children;
- Princess Jelena (Cetinje, Montenegro, January 8, 1873 – Montpellier, France, November 28, 1952), Queen of the Kingdom of Italy from 1900 to 1946, consort and wife of King Victor Emmanuel III of Italy;
- Princess Anna (Cetinje, Montenegro, August 18, 1874 – Montreux, Switzerland, April 22, 1971), married Prince Franz Joseph of Battenberg, but remained childless;
- Princess Sofia (Cetinje, Montenegro, May 2, 1876 – Cetinje, June 14, 1876);
- Prince Mirko Dimitri (Cetinje, Montenegro, April 17, 1879 – Vienna, Austria, March 2, 1918) married Natalija Konstantinović, granddaughter of Princess Anka Obrenović and a cousin of King Alexander I Obrenović, and had a son, Prince Michael of Montenegro;
- Princess Xenia (Cetinje, Montenegro, April 22, 1881 – Paris, France, March 10, 1960);
- Princess Vjera (Rijeka Crnojevića, Montenegro, February 22, 1887 – Antibes, October 31, 1927);
- Prince Petar (Cetinje, Montenegro, October 10, 1889 – Meran, Italy, May 7, 1932); married 1924 Violet Emily Wegner, widowed Countess d'Usseaux (after conversion to Orthodoxy her name was Ljubica). They had no children.

== Honours ==
Foreign

- Austria-Hungary: Order of Elizabeth
- Kingdom of Bulgaria: Order of Civil Merit
- Ottoman Empire: Order of Charity
- Russian Empire: Order of Saint Catherine
- Kingdom of Portugal: Order of Saint Isabel

== See also ==
- Louise of Hesse-Kassel – Queen of Denmark and married to a king who was also nicknamed the "father-in-law of Europe"
  - Descendants of Christian IX of Denmark – Lists progeny of Louise of Hesse-Kassel

== Notes ==
Regnal titles
Preceded by Darinka Kvekić	Princess consort of Montenegro; 8 November 1860 – 28 August 1910	Proclaimed queen
