= Darinka, Princess of Montenegro =

Montenegrin princess (1838–1892)

Darinka Petrović-Njegoš
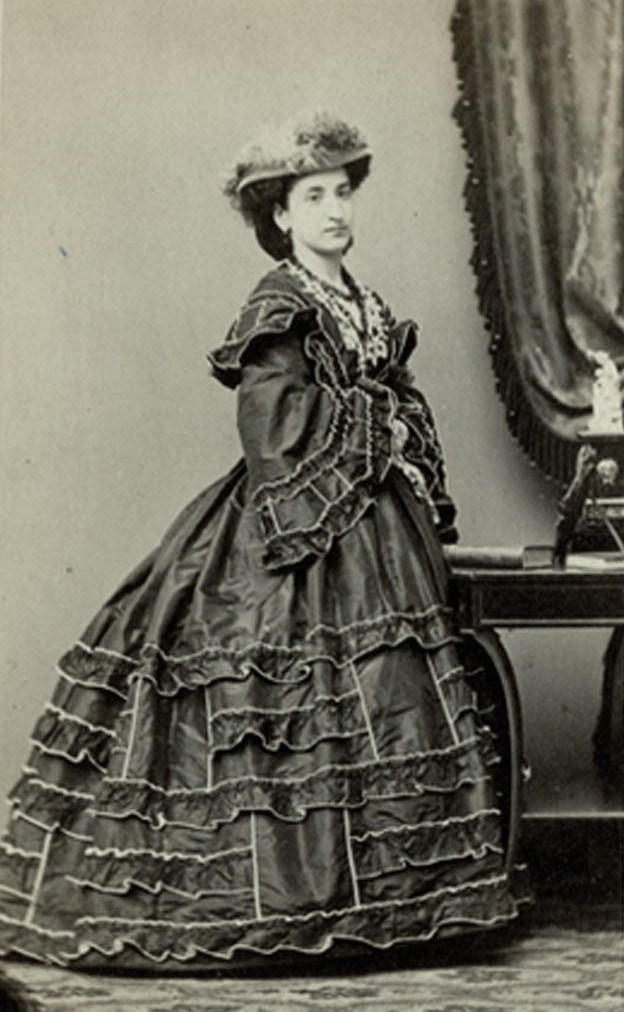

Princess consort of Montenegro
- Tenure: 12 January 1855 — 13 August 1860
- Born: Darinka Kvekić; 19 December 1838; Trieste, Austrian Empire
- Died: 2 February 1892 (aged 53); Venice, Kingdom of Italy
- Burial: Cetinje Monastery
- Spouse: Danilo I, Prince of Montenegro (m. 1855; died 1860)
- Issue: Princess Olga
- House: Petrović-Njegoš (by marriage)
- Father: Marko Kvekić
- Mother: Jelisaveta Mirković

Darinka Petrović-Njegoš (Serbian Cyrillic: Даринка Петровић-Његош; 19 December 1838 – 2 February 1892) was the first Princess of Montenegro by her marriage to Danilo I, Prince of Montenegro.

== Biography ==
Darinka was the daughter of the Serbian merchant and banker Marko Kvekić and Jelisaveta Mirković. She grew up in Trieste, and was educated to become a French style fashionable high society lady.

Her father had an important position, as he managed the transition of the Russian financial aid to Montenegro. He thus had contact with Danilo I, who was introduced to Darinka during a dinner at Palazzo Gopcevich in Trieste, home of Darinka's cousin, Spiridione Gopcevich. Danilo I had initially planned to marry Princess Kleopatra Karađorđević, daughter of Alexander Karađorđević, Prince of Serbia, but the negotiations with Alexander was protracted, and Danilo I fell in love with Darinka.

=== Princess of Montenegro ===
She married Danilo I on 12 January 1855 at Njeguši. They had one daughter, Princess Olga.

The marriage took place after he had made the theocracy Montenegro into a monarchy by renouncing his title as Prince Bishop of Montenegro for the title and position of Sovereign Prince of Montenegro. Darinka thus became the first Princess of Montenegro, and the hostess of the first court formed in Montenegro.

Darinka are known to have introduced many Western European customs in Montenegro, which was a very traditional society at this time period. She could speak Latin, French, Russian, and Italian, and encouraged Danilo to learn French and Russian. She dressed in French fashion, brought her own Western European staff and furniture to the Princely Residence in Cetinje, and arranged court functions to which her guests were invited to dance the waltz to foreign music, and she entertained them playing the piano. This was normal in the upper class life of Western Europe but new in Montenegro, and Darinka was both admired for the glamour she brought, as well as resented as vain and accused of draining the state treasury with her extravagance. She is said to have introduced the umbrella to Montenegro. She gave Montenegro a cosmetic polish of Western Europe by convincing Damilo to abolish traditional Medieval customs such as displaying the severed heads of enemies on the square.

The marriage was described as happy but full of jealousy. Danilo was described as deeply in love with Darinka and affected by a jealous temperament, and there were rumours that Danilo challenged and killed men who were rumoured to be the lovers of Darinka, among them his own personal friend Savo Đurašković. Danilo respected Darinka's diplomatic ability and asked her for advice in state affairs, and she was kept under watch by Russia, who was the biggest financial contributor to Russia and suspected her for influencing his policy toward Russia because she was a Francophile.

=== Later life ===
On 13 August 1860, Danilo was murdered and succeeded by his nephew Nicholas I of Montenegro. Darinka initially kept her dominant position at court also after the death of Danilo and during his successor, Nicholas, with whom she was close. Her successor, Milena Vukotić, was not able to consolidate her position until after Princess Darinka left Montenegro. Darinka left Montenegro as a widow, but returned to advice Nicholas during the peace negotiations after the Montenegrin–Ottoman War (1861–1862).

She built her own palace in Cetinje 1863-1867 and made several trips to Western Europe, and the fact that Nicholas paid her expenses from the state treasury, allowed her political influence and neglected his wife Milena for Darinka, resulted in opposition to her presence in Montenegro. There were rumours that Darinka and Nicholas had a love affair, and the Serbian ambassador wrote in his diplomatic report that the relationship between Darinka and Nicholas "exceeded the border of friendship".

From 1864 onward, Nicholas' wife Milena started to give birth to children, which raised her popularity and improved her relationship with Nicholas, while his relationship with Darinka deteriorated. In 1867, Darinka saw herself obliged to leave Montenegro because of the public opposition to her presence. She left for Venice with her daughter Olga. They lived the rest of their life in Venice, and were never again given permission from Nicholas to return to Montenegro. Her residence in Cetinje was transformed to the Cetinje Royal Palace.

== Issue ==
- Olga (Cetinje, March 19, 1859 – Venice, September 21, 1896), died childless.

Preceded by New position	Princess Consort of Montenegro; 1855–1860	Succeeded by Milena Vukotić
