= Princess Anna of Montenegro =

Anna of Montenegro
- Princess Francis Joseph of Battenberg
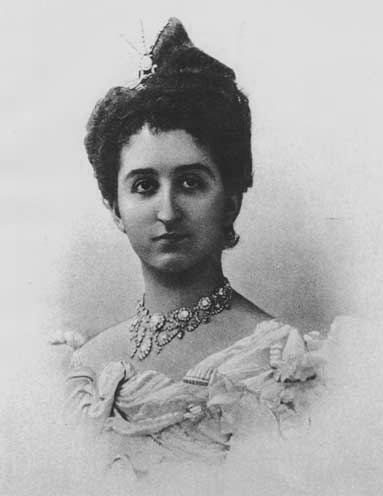
- Born: 18 August 1874; Cetinje, Montenegro
- Died: 22 April 1971 (aged 96); Montreux, Switzerland
- Spouse: Prince Francis Joseph of Battenberg (m. 1897; died 1924)
Names
- Ana Petrović-Njegoš
- House: Petrović-Njegoš
- Father: Nicholas I of Montenegro
- Mother: Milena Vukotić

Princess Anna of Montenegro (18 August 1874 – 22 April 1971) was the seventh child and sixth daughter of Nicholas I of Montenegro and his wife Queen Milena.

== Family and early life ==
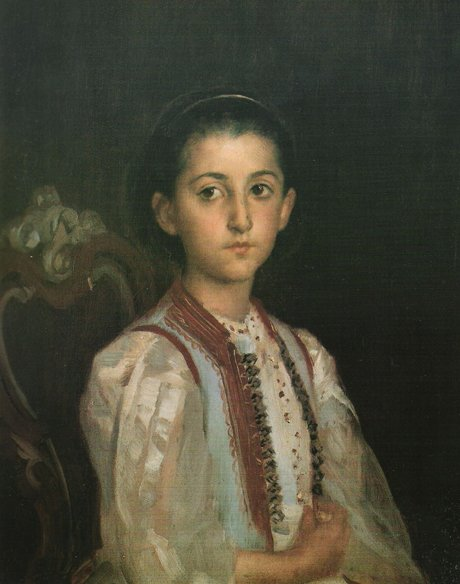
Portrait of Princess Anna of Montenegro by Vlaho Bukovac in 1888

Anna was born on 18 August 1874 to Nicholas, Prince of Montenegro and his consort Princess Milena; on 28 August 1910, Nicholas would become King of Montenegro.

Anna's sisters were particularly noted for achieving marriages with powerful royal figures, causing their father, like the contemporary Christian IX of Denmark, to earn the sobriquet "father-in-law of Europe"; one source declared that these advantageous marriages "had done more for [Montenegro] than all the brave deeds of this nation of warriors". For instance, Princesses Zorka, Milica, Anastasia and Elena all made important marriages into the royal families of Serbia, Russia and Italy, respectively. Like all her sisters, Anna was educated in Russia at the expense of the Russian imperial family, and upon each of their marriages, were given dowries by the Russian emperor.

== Marriage ==
=== Background ===
Princess Anna with her husband Prince Francis Joseph at their at their residence, Prinz-Emil-Garten

Anna met Prince Francis Joseph of Battenberg at Cimiez, France, where the prince was a guest of the visiting Queen Victoria and Anna was visiting her sister Princess Milica of Montenegro and brother-in-law Grand Duke Peter Nikolaevich of Russia. In La Turbie, a small party composed of Queen Victoria, Princess Alice of Battenberg, Prince Francis Joseph, Princess Anna, and others went on an afternoon drive together. While most of the party went to a booth to view a camera obscura, Anna and Francis Joseph broke away; soon afterwards, Francis Joseph's brother Prince Louis of Battenberg announced the engagement to Princess Anna.

The Battenberg family was the product of a morganatic marriage, and though it was a lesser status than other royalty, the family had close ties with the United Kingdom, as Prince Henry was married to Princess Beatrice of the United Kingdom, Victoria's youngest daughter. The Battenbergs were well known for their good looks, charm, and perhaps most importantly, their lack of political controversy, which may have helped them secure favorable royal partners.

=== Ceremony ===
Anna at the time she was betrothed, 1897

Anna and Francis gained the permission of Queen Victoria and the Russian court in order to marry. On 18 May 1897 in the presence of her entire family, Anna married Prince Francis Joseph of Battenberg in both Eastern Orthodox and Protestant wedding ceremonies in Cetinje, Montenegro.

Francis was a colonel in the Bulgarian cavalry, where his older brother Alexander had been sovereign Prince of Bulgaria until 1886. Francis was well liked not only by Queen Victoria, but also by Nicholas II of Russia and Empress Alexandra Feodorovna; Nicholas is said to have given Anna one million rubles as a dowry. This Russian connection was likely the result of Anna's two sisters (Princess Milica of Montenegro and Princess Anastasia of Montenegro) being married to Grand Duke Peter Nikolaevich and George Maximilianovich, 6th Duke of Leuchtenberg, respectively, as well as Francis being first cousin once removed of both Nicholas II and Alexandra Feodorovna.

== Later life ==
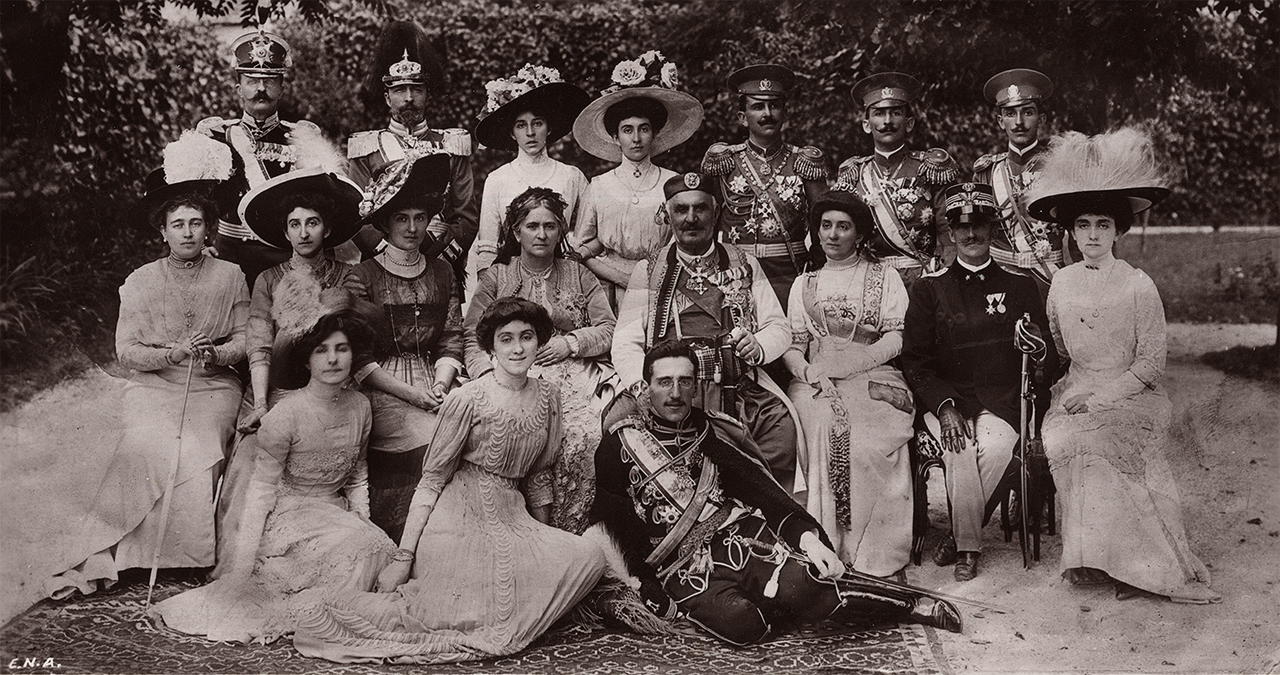
The family of Nicholas I of Montenegro, 1910.

Anna was said to be "unusually beautiful"; she was vivacious, and tall, while Francis was handsome, likable, tall, and well-educated. The happily married couple had no children. Anna and Francis were very popular with their respective families.

The same year they married, Francis was rumored to have been chosen as governor-general of the politically turbulent island of Crete by Turkey and Greece.

Prior to World War I, Anna and her husband spent much of their time at Prinz Emils Garten in Darmstadt, but once the war began, they were advised by Francis' cousin Ernest Louis, Grand Duke of Hesse to stay out of Germany. When Italy joined the war, the couple found themselves to be permanent exiles, and consequently settled in Switzerland, where Francis pursued his academic studies. The couple had never been rich, but now their financial state was worse than ever; by August 1916, Francis was described as "awfully bad off". Throughout her life, Princess Anna anonymously wrote and published a large number of musical compositions that obtained a certain degree of commercial success. The royalties from these compositions provided a much-needed source of income for the couple. While working on an opera in 1899, Anna gained an interview of considerable length with the famous Italian composer Pietro Mascagni in the royal palace of Naples, as she wanted to consult him for musical advice. Anna's sister Crown Princess Elena of Italy helped her procure the meeting.

=== Death ===
Francis died on 31 July 1924 in Territet (near Montreux, Switzerland). Though she had never met him, his niece-in-law Edwina Mountbatten had continuously sent him an allowance during her lifetime, and continued to do so with his widow, sending Anna money until Edwina's own death in 1960.

In the British royal family's 1917 eradication of German titles and styles, the Battenbergs became known as Mountbattens – all except Prince Francis and Anna. Anna would continue to use the name Battenberg until her death, surpassing all others in the royal house. Anna died on 22 April 1971 in Montreux, Switzerland. For a number of years, she was Europe's oldest living princess.

== See also ==
- Petrović-Njegoš family tree
- List of Montenegrins
