= Court Church (Cetinje) =

Coordinates: 42°23′13″N 18°55′25″E

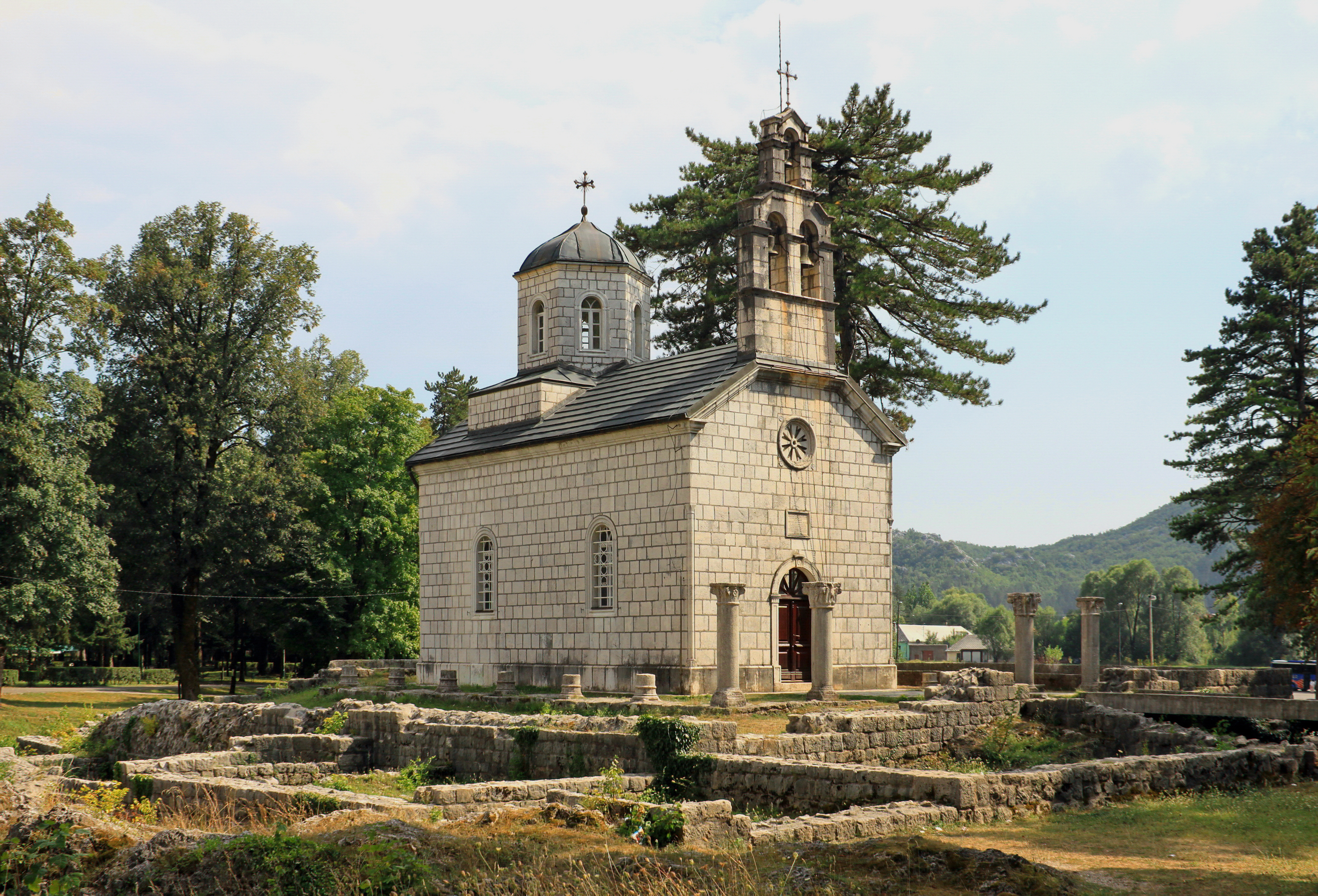
- The church pictured in 2012
- Court Church
- Location: Ćipur, Cetinje, Montenegro
- Denomination: Serbian Orthodox

History
- Founded: 1890

Administration
- Diocese: Metropolitanate of Montenegro and the Littoral

The Court Church in Ćipur (Serbian Cyrillic: Дворска црква на Ћипуру, romanized: Dvorska crkva na Ćipuru) is a Serbian Orthodox church located in the Ćipur neighborhood of Cetinje, Montenegro.

== History ==
The church is dedicated to the Birth of the Most Holy Mother of God and is located on the historical site of Ćipur in the historical core of Cetinje, the former capital of the Kingdom of Montenegro. It was built by King Nikola I in 1890, on the place where there used to be a monastery that Ivan Crnojević built in the 15th century dedicated to the Mother of God.

The church was declared a cultural heritage monument in 1961, and in 2012 it became part of the History Museum of Montenegro. As a monumental unit, together with the archeological remains of the monastery complex of the Crnojević noble family, it is a World Heritage Site candidate.

The remains of Ivan Crnojević, King Nikola I, Queen Milena and Montenegrin princesses Ksenija and Vjera are interred in the church.

== See also ==
- Cetinje Monastery
