= Konstantinović =

Konstantinović (Serbian Cyrillic: Константиновић) is a Serbian surname, a patronymic derived from the masculine given name Konstantin (Constantine). It may refer to the following notable people:

- Radomir Konstantinović (1928−2011), Serbian writer and philosopher
- Katarina Konstantinović (1848–1910), Serbian noblewoman
- Natalija Konstantinović (1882−1950), Princess consort of Montenegro
- Anka Konstantinović (1821–1868), Serbian noblewoman

== See also ==
- Kostadinović, similar surname
