= Vukota =

Vukota (Serbian Cyrillic: Вукота) is a masculine given name and a surname. It may refer to:

- Vukota Pavić (born 1993), basketball player
- Mick Vukota (born 1966), ice hockey player
- Vukota Brajovic (born 1979), actor

== See also ==
- Vukotić
