= Olga Petrović Njegoš =

Montenegrin princess

Olga Petrović Njegoš (Cetinje, March 19, 1859 – Venice, September 21, 1896), was a Montenegrin princess.

She was the daughter and the only child of Danilo I, Prince of Montenegro and Darinka, Princess of Montenegro.

In 1860, her father died, and was succeeded by Nicholas I. In 1867, she left Montenegro with her mother and settled in Venice.

Princess Olga was described as quite pretty, and as a timid and sweet tempered personality. In accordance with the will of her father, Olga was placed under the guardianship of her mother until she reached the age of eighteen, and after that she was to come in to the inheritance and lands of her father. However, Nicholas I did not give permission to her or her mother to return to Montenegro again once they had left, so she was never able to take control of her inheritance. Reportedly, she had no recollection of Montenegro. Having no real property but still of royal birth, she remained unmarried, since she was expected to marry a royal but her lack of dynastic importance or property never made her a valuable on the royal marriage market. She lived her life in Venice, where she died unmarried and childless. Her remains were buried in Montenegro.
