= Father-in-law of Europe =

Sobriquet of two European kings

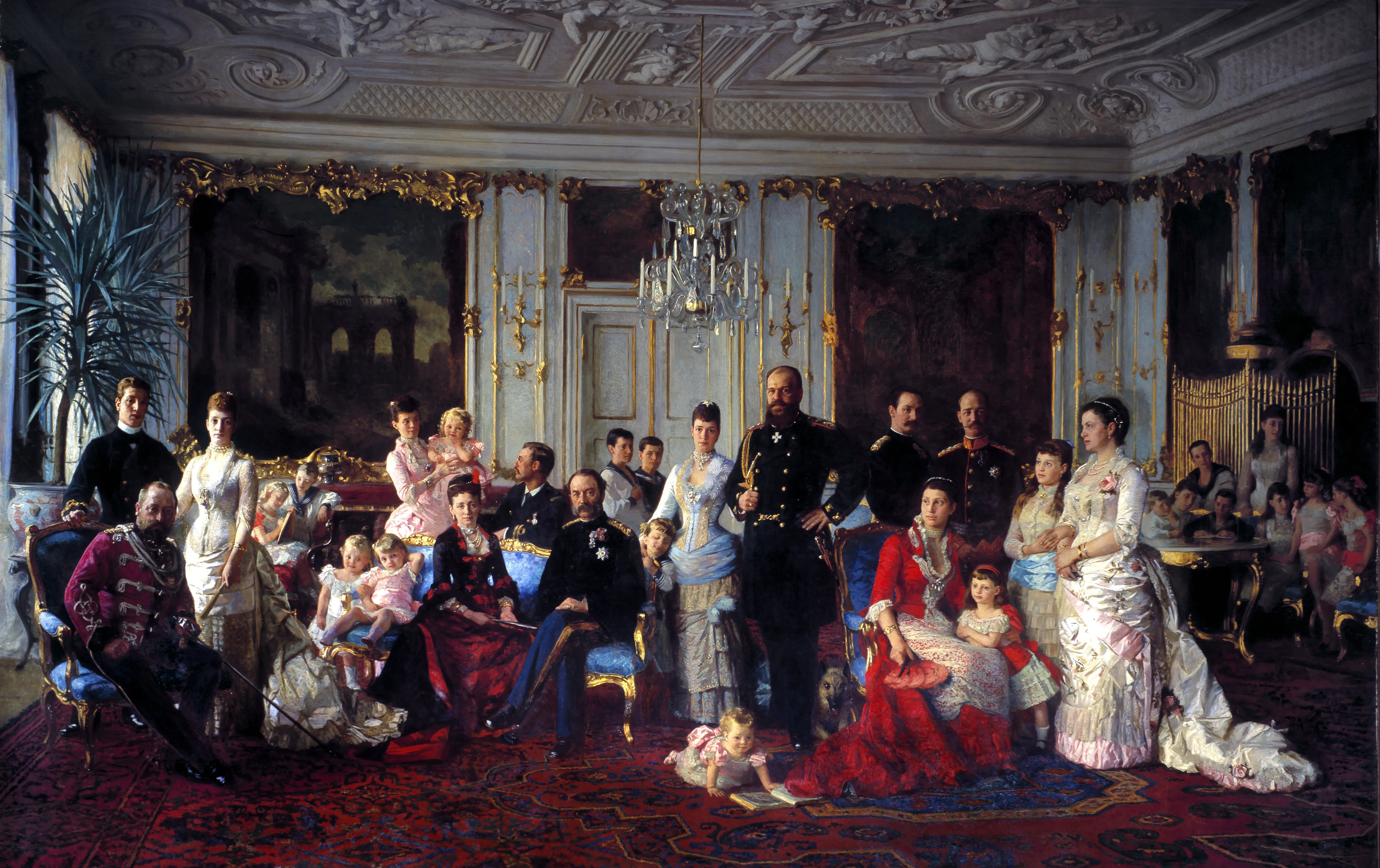
King Christian IX with his large family gathered at Fredensborg Palace, painting by Laurits Tuxen from 1883 to 1886

The father-in-law of Europe is a sobriquet which has been used to refer to two European monarchs of the late 19th and early 20th century: Christian IX of Denmark and Nicholas I of Montenegro, both on account of their children's marriages to foreign princes and princesses. The fact that each was a monarch of moderate or modest power (and thus a marriage would not threaten the delicate balance of power) allowed them to marry some of their many children to heirs of greater fortunes across the continent.

== Christian IX of Denmark ==
The children of King Christian IX (1818–1906) and Queen Louise (1817–1898) of Denmark included:

- King Frederik VIII of Denmark (1843–1912)
- Queen Alexandra of the United Kingdom (1844–1925), wife of King Edward VII
- King George I of Greece (1845–1913)
- Empress Maria Feodorovna of Russia (1847–1928), wife of Emperor Alexander III
- Crown Princess Thyra of Hanover (1853–1933), who married Crown Prince Ernest Augustus
- Prince Valdemar of Denmark

Christian IX used to gather his children, children-in-law and grandchildren for the so-called Fredensborg days at Fredensborg Palace north of Copenhagen in the summer time. Christian and Louise's grandchildren included Kings Christian X of Denmark, George V of the United Kingdom, Constantine I of Greece, Emperor Nicholas II of Russia, and both King Haakon VII and Queen Maud of Norway.

== Nicholas I of Montenegro ==
Nicholas I of Montenegro (1841–1921) was the father of:

- Zorka of Montenegro, who married King Peter I of Serbia
- Elena of Montenegro, who married King Victor Emmanuel III of Italy
- Anna of Montenegro, who married Prince Francis Joseph of Battenberg
- Two daughters who married brothers:
  - Anastasia of Montenegro, who married Grand Duke Nicholas Nikolaevich of Russia after divorcing George, Duke of Leuchtenberg
  - Milica of Montenegro, who married Grand Duke Peter Nikolaevich of Russia

== See also ==
- Queen Victoria, who was known as the grandmother of Europe
  - Descendants of Queen Victoria
- Louis IX of Hesse-Darmstadt, the most recent common ancestor of all current European monarchs since 2022
- John William Friso, Prince of Orange, until 2022, the most recent common ancestor of all European monarchs since World War II, current and former
- Miguel I of Portugal, another European king whose children strategically married into various European royal families
  - Descendants of Miguel I of Portugal
