= Michael, Prince of Montenegro =

Montenegrin prince (1908–1986)

Michael Petrović-Njegoš
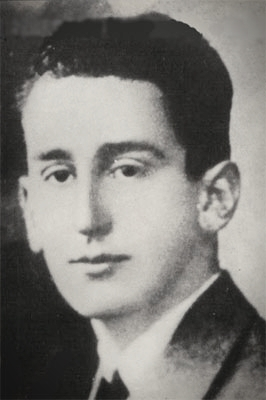

Head of the Royal House of Montenegro
- Tenure: 7 March 1921 – 24 March 1986
- Predecessor: Crown Prince Danilo
- Successor: Prince Nicholas
- Born: 14 September 1908; Podgorica, Montenegro
- Died: 24 March 1986 (aged 77); Paris, France
- Burial: Serbian section of the Thiais cemetery, Paris, France
- Spouse: Geneviève Prigent (m. 1941)
- Issue: Nicholas, Prince of Montenegro
- House: Petrović-Njegoš
- Father: Prince Mirko of Montenegro
- Mother: Natalija Konstantinović

Prince Michael Petrović-Njegoš of Montenegro (Serbian Cyrillic: Принц Михаило Петровић Његош; 14 September 1908 – 24 March 1986) was the third (but eldest surviving) son of Prince Mirko of Montenegro, Grand Voivode of Grahovo and Zeta (1879–1918), and Natalija Konstantinović, a cousin of Aleksandar Obrenović of Serbia. He was pretender to the throne of Montenegro, holding the title Grand Duke of Grahovo and Zeta, in succession to his father. King Nicholas I of Montenegro was Michael's grandfather. Michael had recognized and acknowledged the Unification of Montenegro with Serbia, renouncing the throne. During World War II, he was held prisoner by the Nazis after refusing to take up the throne of the Axis forces' re-established Montenegrin puppet-state. During the period of Yugoslav socialism, he was an active member of the Serb diaspora revolutionary organization and a diplomatic worker against the socialist government led by Marshal Tito.

He was a member of the Crown Council of King Peter II of Yugoslavia.

== Early life ==
Michael was born in Podgorica in 1908, the son of Prince Mirko of Montenegro. In 1916, the defence of Montenegro against the invasion by Austria-Hungary during the First World War collapsed and he, along with the rest of the royal family, fled to Italy. There, he briefly attended a boarding school in Naples before joining his mother, who had taken up residence in Eastbourne in the United Kingdom where he completed his primary education.

== Accession ==
In 1918, a pro-Serb assembly deposed his grandfather and merged Montenegro into Serbia. Shortly after that, the enlarged Serbia led the formation of the Kingdom of the Serbs, Croats and Slovenes (Yugoslavia).

After Nikola died in 1921, the defunct throne was inherited by Danilo, Crown Prince of Montenegro. However, Danilo unexpectedly abdicated a few days later and his nephew the young Michael (who succeeded him as pretender) "reigned" as King Mihailo I under the guidance of a regent. On 14 September 1929 the Regency of General Anto Gvozdenović ended and Mihailo renounced his dynasty's claim to the throne of Montenegro and declared allegiance to the Kingdom of Yugoslavia. In gratitude, the King of Yugoslavia, Alexander I rewarded Prince Mihailo with a pension from the Civil List.

== The Axis Proposition ==
In 1941, following the Fall of France, Prince Mihailo and his wife were arrested by the German occupation authorities. They were transferred to Germany and were held at a castle on the shores of Lake Constance. It was here that they were visited by Count Galeazzo Ciano and Joachim von Ribbentrop and were offered the throne of a new, independent Kingdom of Montenegro, but under Italian and German protection and guidance. He rejected this offer and remained imprisoned in Germany until his aunt, the Queen of Italy (Elena of Montenegro), secured their release in 1943. They returned to France only to be arrested by the German authorities and transferred to an internment camp at Jezeří Castle in occupied Czechoslovakia. The couple's son Prince Nicholas of Montenegro was born in 1944 in France, in Saint-Nicolas-du-Pélem, Brittany.

== The Communist Proposition ==
At the end of the war Michael, his wife and infant son were released; they returned to France, taking up residence in Paris. Shortly after this he began talking to Marshal Tito of the newly socialist Yugoslavia and was invited to visit the country. In 1947 the young family took up residence in Belgrade and Prince Mihailo accepted the position as Head of Protocol at the Ministry for Foreign Affairs. Prince Mihailo was able to visit Montenegro for the first time since 1916, and realized that the memory of his family was still alive amongst the people. Eventually disappointed with Tito, he returned to France with his family in June 1948.

== Opposition to Communist Dictatorship ==
From its founding in 1946, Michael Petrovich spent his years as an active political dissident of the Communist regime and worked to bring about its downfall. He was a member of the revolutionary Serb Liberation Movement Fatherland, aimed at gathering the Serb diaspora and internal dissidents in an effort to destroy the Yugoslav Communists.

== Later life and death ==
Following his break with the government of Yugoslavia, the money he received from the civil list was terminated. Soon after, he and his wife divorced and he remained in exile until his death in 1986. Their son, Nicholas, was brought up by his mother. Prince Mihailo is buried in the Serbian Military section of the Thiais cemetery in Paris.

== Marriage and children ==
Michael married in Paris on 27 January 1941 Geneviève [Genovefa] Denise Charlotte Prigent (4 December 1919, in Saint-Brieuc – 26 January 1990, in Lannion), second daughter of Dr. François Marie Prigent (Fontenay-sous-Bois, 8 March 1883 - Saint-Brieuc, 20 August 1947), a surgeon in Saint-Brieuc, and his wife (Neuilly-sur-Seine, 17 October 1905) Blanche Victorine Eugénie Bitte (Paris, 14 October 1883 - Saint-Brieuc, 3 December 1958). They divorced on 11 April/August 1949 in Paris. Shortly after, Geneviève started a career of orthoptist in Trébeurden.

They had one child:

- Nicholas, Prince of Montenegro (b. Saint-Nicolas-du-Pélem, France, 7 July 1944)

== Ancestors ==
Ancestors of Michael, Prince of Montenegro

16. Stanko Petrović-Njegoš
8. Mirko Petrović Njegoš
17. Krstinja Vrbica
4. Nicholas I of Montenegro
18. Drago Martinović
9. Anastasija Martinović
19. Stana Martinović
2. Prince Mirko of Montenegro
20. Stevan P. Vukotić-Perković
10. Petar Vukotić
21. Stana Milić
5. Milena Vukotić
22. Tadija Vojvodić
11. Jelena Vojvodić
23. Milica Pavićević
1. Michael, Prince of Montenegro
24. Obrad Konstantinović
12. Alexander Konstantinović
25. Danica Gvozdenović
6. Alexander Konstantinović
26. Jevram Obrenović
13. Princess Anka Obrenović
27. Tomanija Bogicević
3. Natalija Konstantinović
28. Tadija Opujić
14. Alexander Opujić
29. Vidosava Milić
7. Milena Opujić
30. Rajko Bošković
15. Marija Bošković
31. Mara Nikčević

== Works ==
- Njegoš's Chapel on Lovćen - Sacred Place (Serbian: Његошева капела на Ловћену)
- "From My Memoirs" (Serbian: Из мојих мемоара), The Serb National Defense, 1961, Windsor

Michael, Prince of Montenegro House of Petrović-Njegoš Born: 14 September 1908 Died: 24 March 1986
Titles in pretence
Preceded by Crown Prince Danilo	— TITULAR — King of Montenegro; 7 March 1921 – 24 March 1986; Reason for succession failure: Montenegro declared union with Serbia in 1918	Succeeded by Nicholas
