= Natalija Konstantinović =

- Princess Natalija of Montenegro; Grand Duchess of Grahovo and Zeta; Countess Errembault de Dudzeele
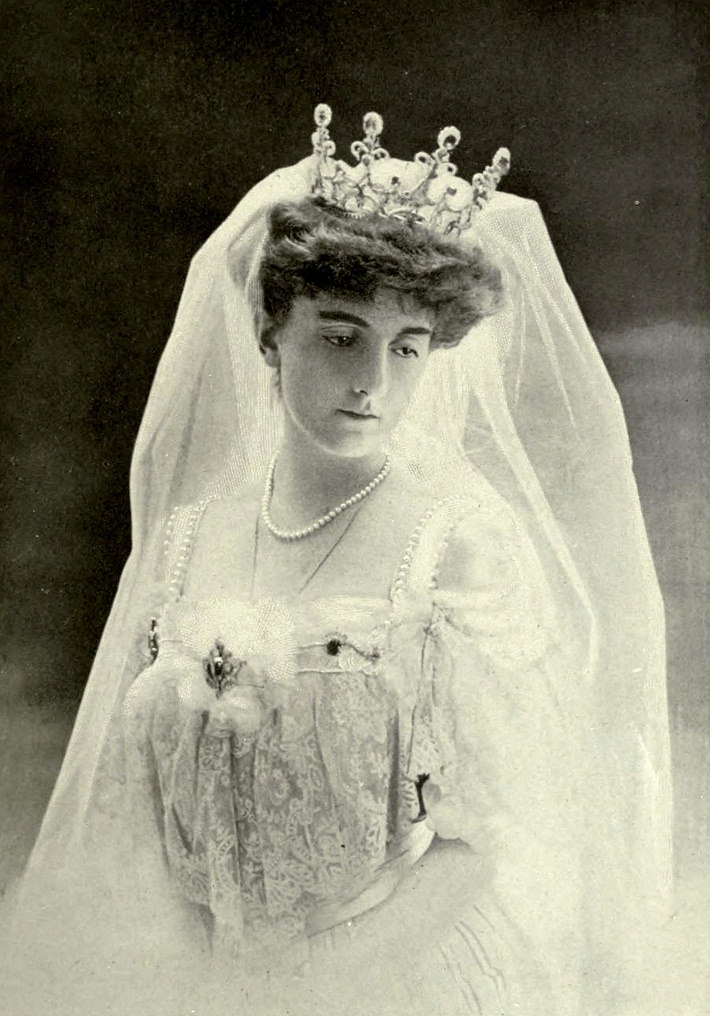
- Born: 10 October 1882; Trieste, Austria-Hungary
- Died: 21 August 1950 (aged 67); Paris, France
- Spouse: Prince Mirko of Montenegro, Grand Duke of Grahovo and Zeta; Gaston, Count Errembault de Dudzeele
- Issue: Prince Shchepac; Prince Stanislaw; Prince Michael; Prince Pavle; Prince Emmanuel; Hélène Errembault de Dudzeele; Anne-Marie Errembault de Dudzeele
- House: Petrović-Njegoš (by marriage)
- Father: Colonel Alexander Konstantinović
- Mother: Milena Opujić
- Religion: Serbian Orthodox

Natalija Konstantinović (Serbian Cyrillic: Наталија Константиновић; 10 October 1882 – 21 August 1950) was a Princess of Montenegro, as the wife of Prince Mirko Petrović-Njegoš. By virtue of marriage she was member of the House of Petrović-Njegoš, ruling family of the Kingdom of Montenegro. The couple had five sons; however, two died in early childhood. They divorced in 1917, a year after the royal family was forced to flee the kingdom. She was the granddaughter of Princess Anka Obrenović of Serbia, member of the ill-fated House of Obrenović. Her husband was promised the Serbian crown in the event of King Alexander I dying childless; however, the crown went to Prince Peter Karađorđević, her husband's brother in law, following Alexander's assassination in 1903.

== Family ==
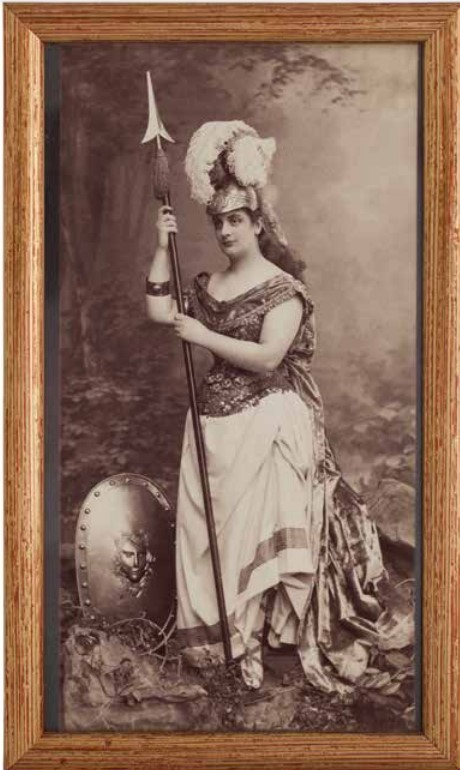
Mileva Opujić, mother of Natalija, in a costume from one of the Wagner’s operas

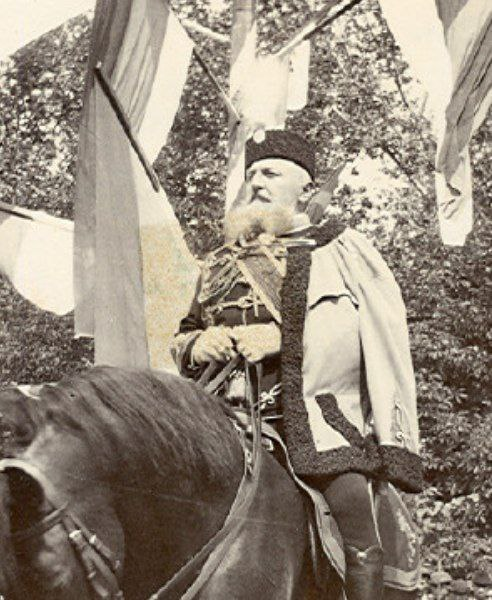
Natalija's father, Colonel Alexander Konstantinović, son of Princess Anka Obrenović

Natalija was born in Trieste, Austria-Hungary, on 10 October 1882, daughter of Colonel Alexander Konstantinović (1848 - Trieste, 1931) and wife (Trieste, 18 March 1878) Mileva Opujić (Trieste, 12 April 1860 - Paris, 3 January 1939), member of a wealthy family of Serbian merchants and patrons of the theater from Trieste, who had ships in the Adriatic and wheat and vineyards on the Danube. She was paternal granddaughter of Alexander Konstantinović (son of Obrad Konstantinović and wife Danica Gvozdenović) and his wife Princess Anka Obrenović (1 April 1821 - murdered, Topcider, Belgrade, 10 June 1868, daughter of Jevrem Obrenović and wife Tomanija Bogicević) and maternal granddaughter of Alexander Opujić (son of Tadija Opujić and wife Vidosava Milić) and wife Maria Bosković (daughter of Rajko Bosković and wife Mara Nikcević). She had one brother. She was descended from the tragic, ill-fated Obrenović Dynasty, which had ruled Serbia for the greater part of the 19th century. Her paternal grandmother, Princess Anka Obrenović, was the paternal niece of Miloš Obrenović I, Prince of Serbia, founder of the House of Obrenović. Natalija and her family were exiled from Serbia after her father criticised King Alexander I's unpopular marriage to the notorious Draga Mašin. They lived alternatively between Nice, Italy, and Vienna.

== Marriages and issue ==
On 25 July 1902, at Cetinje, Natalija was married to Prince Mirko of Montenegro, Grand Duke of Grahovo and Zeta (1879-1918), the second eldest son of Nicholas I of Montenegro. Prince Mirko had allegedly fallen passionately in love with Natalija who was described as a beautiful, dark-eyed brunette. King Alexander was not pleased by the news of their marriage, as he believed Mirko had only married her in order to obtain the Serbian crown; in addition, Mirko's predeceased elder sister, Zorka had been the wife of Alexander's rival Peter Karađorđević. As a sign of his displeasure he refused to receive either Natalija or Mirko at his court.

As Natalija was the granddaughter of Princess Anka Obrenović, who had been assassinated in Belgrade on 10 June 1868 along with her cousin, Mihailo Obrenović III, the Serbian government promised that in the event of King Alexander Obrenović dying childless, Mirko would be proclaimed Crown Prince of Serbia. Events, however, did not proceed as Nikola I of Montenegro had hoped. In late May 1903, King Alexander and his consort, Draga, were assassinated by a group of Army officers led by Captain Dragutin Dimitrijević Apis. Prior to the assassination, the conspirators had voted to pass the crown to Mirko's brother-in-law, Peter, the head of the rival Serbian dynasty, the Karađorđevićs. This was because the Karađorđevićs were allied with Russia, whereas the Obrenovićs were decidedly pro-Habsburg, and therefore distasteful to many Serbs in light of the fervent Pan-Slavic nationalism that had engulfed Serbia since the 19th century. In fact, Natalija's husband later joined the Black Hand secret society in 1911, and aspired to be its leader.

== Children ==
Together Mirko and Natalija had five sons:

- Prince Shchepac (Stephan) of Montenegro (27 August 1903 - 15 March 1908)
- Prince Stanislaw of Montenegro (30 January 1905 - 4 January 1908)
- Prince Michael of Montenegro (14 September 1908 - 24 March 1986), married Geneviève Prigent, by whom he had one son, Nicolas.
- Prince Pavle of Montenegro (16 May 1910 - June 1933)
- Prince Emmanuel of Montenegro (10 June 1912 - 26 March 1928)

In 1908, her two eldest sons died, and she gave birth to her third son, Michael. On 28 August 1910, Montenegro became a kingdom, with her father-in-law ascending the Montenegrin throne as the first and only king. In 1916, the defence of Montenegro collapsed when the Austro-Hungarian forces invaded the kingdom during World War I, and the entire royal family, including Natalija, was compelled to flee to Italy. The couple were divorced in October 1917, and Natalija moved to Paris with her surviving sons. The following year, Mirko died in Vienna and her eldest surviving son Michael became head of the House of Petrović-Njegoš and pretender to the defunct throne of Montenegro. Natilija took Michael to Eastbourne, England, where he completed his primary education.

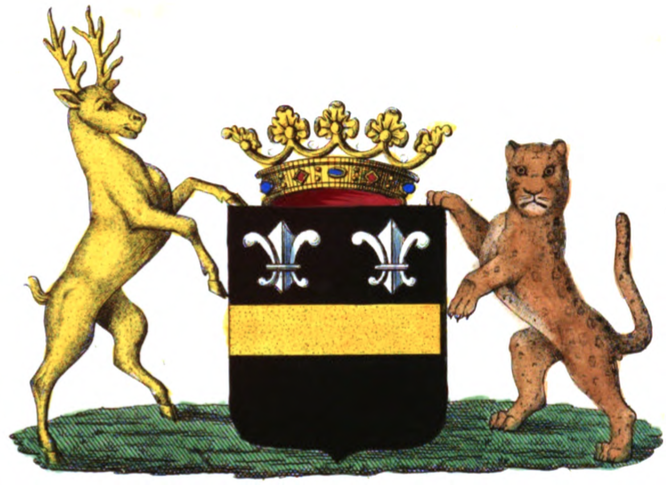
Coat of arms of the Errembault de Dudzeele family

On 9 January 1920, she married secondly in Eastbourne (Sussex), Gaston, Count Errembault de Dudzeele (1877–1961), a Belgian diplomat and member of Errembault de Dudzeele noble family, and had two daughters:

- Hélène Errembault de Dudzeele (1921-2006) married in 1949, Philippe Hiolle (1895-1969). She had one daughter and one son : Caroline Hiolle and Hervé Hiolle.
- Anne-Marie Errembault de Dudzeele (1922-1984) married in 1946, Philippe Cerf (1923-), and in 1958, Pierre Saville (1907-1976, né Schumann). She had three daughters : Géraldine Cerf, Carlyne Cerf and Marie-Pierre Saville.

Princess Natalija died in Paris on 21 August 1950, at the age of 67.

== Ancestry ==
Ancestors of Natalija Konstantinović

8. Obrad Konstantinović
4. Alexander Konstantinović
9. Danica Gvozdenović
2. Colonel Alexander Konstantinović
10. Prince Jevrem Obrenović
5. Princess Anka Obrenović
11. Tomanija Bogicević
1. Natalija Konstantinović
12. Tadija Opujić
6. Alexander Opujić
13. Vidosava Milić
3. Milena Opujić
14. Rajko Bošković
7. Marija Bošković
15. Mara Nikčević

== See also ==
- Triestine Serbs
- Serbs in Italy
- Serbian diaspora

== Sources ==
- C. L. Sulzberger, The Fall of Eagles, 1977, Crown Publishing, Inc., New York
