= Kostadinović =

Kostadinović (Serbian: Костадиновић) is a Serbo-Croatian surname, a patronymic derived from Kostadin (Constantine). It may refer to the following notable people:

- Miloš Kostadinović (born 1988), Serbian handballer
- Petar Kostadinović (born 1992), Croatian-Italian footballer

== See also ==
- Kostandinović
- Konstantinović
