= List of Montenegrin royal consorts =

Consorts of Montenegro were women married to the Montenegrin monarchs during their reigns. All monarchs of Montenegro were male with the title of King of Montenegro and before that Prince of Montenegro, and even earlier Prince-Bishop of Montenegro; while all Montenegrin consorts were women with the title of Queen of Montenegro and style Majesty and before that title Princess of Montenegro and style Royal Highness. There were no wives of the Prince-Bishops as the Prince-Bishops could not marry by law.

== Consorts of Montenegro ==
The following women were spouses of the monarchs of Montenegro between 1852 and 1918:

Picture	Name	Family	Birth	Marriage	Became princess consort	Ceased to be Consort	Death	Spouse
	Darinka	Kvekić	31 December 1837	12 January 1855		13 August 1860 husband's death	14 February 1892	Danilo II
	Milena	Vukotić	4 May 1847	8 November 1860 elevated to queen consort 28 August 1910		28 November 1918; Montenegrin state abolished	16 March 1923	Nikola I
