= Vojvodić =

Vojvodić (Serbian: Војводић) is a surname. Notable people with the surname include:

- Branko Vojvodic (born 1985), Serbian rugby union player
- Darko Vojvodić (born 1970), Serbian football player and manager
- Milan Vojvodić (born 1994), Serbian footballer
- Minja Vojvodić (1942–2014), Montenegrin actor
