= Martinovitch-Orlovitch =

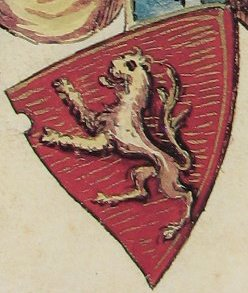
Martinović-Orlović coat of arms in the Korenjic-Neoric Armorial

The Martinović-Orlović family is an old Serbian noble family, originating in the medieval Serbia.

== History ==
They are descendants of the ancient Orlović family and one of Serbia's great heroes, Paul Orlović, the Serbian flag-bearer at the Battle of Kosovo in 1389. One of the most famous members of this family was Obren Martinović who led the Serbian uprising against the Ottoman Empire and started the Obrenović dynasty that would rule Serbia until their assassination by the Black Hand and replacement by the Karadjordjević family. Through marriage of Anastasia Martinović-Orlović (1824-1895) into the Montenegrin royal family, Martinović-Orlović blood can be found in the royal families of Montenegro, Serbia, Russia, Bulgaria and Italy.

Though the use of titles of nobility (in the traditional sense) in the Balkans is somewhat disputed, the members of the family carry the title of voyévode (vojvoda, loosely translated as duke), though several members had carried the title of knez (loosely translated as prince) and others tied to their functions under the Ottoman regime. Just like the other descendants of the Orlović family, the Martinović have an eagle in their crest and Saint John the Baptist as their patron saint.

== Family ==
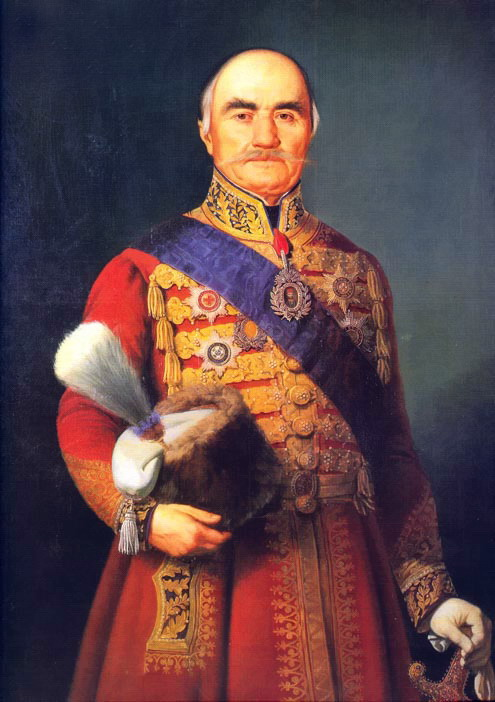
Miloš Obrenović, prince of Serbia

Due to a later stabilisation of family names in the Balkans compared to the rest of Europe, most of the members of the Martinović-Orlović family do not actually carry that last name. The family is composed of the following branches:

- Batrićević (Batritchevitch)
- Dolević (Dolevitch)
- Ivanović (Ivanowitsch)
- Ljuharović (Lyouharovitch)
- Marković (Markovitch)
- Milošević (Milochevitch)
- Muhović (Muhowich)
- Obrenović
- Tomašević (Tomachevitch)
- Prenkić (Prenkitch)
- Raičević (Raichevitch)

Through common Orlović ancestry, they are related to the Samardžić, Osmanagić or Čengić family, but also to Nikola Tesla (disputed).
