= Prince Mirko of Montenegro =

Grand Duke of Grahovo

Prince Mirko
- Grand Duke of Grahovo and Zeta
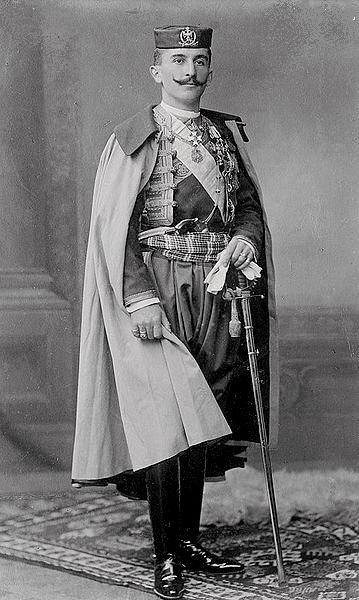
- Born: 17 April 1879; Cetinje, Montenegro
- Died: 3 March 1918 (aged 38); Vienna, Austria
- Burial: Vienna Central Cemetery
- Spouse: Natalija Konstantinović (m. 1902; div. 1917)
- Issue: Prince Stephan; Prince Stanislaw; Michael, Prince of Montenegro; Prince Pavle; Prince Emmanuel
- House: Petrović-Njegoš
- Father: Nicholas I of Montenegro
- Mother: Milena of Montenegro

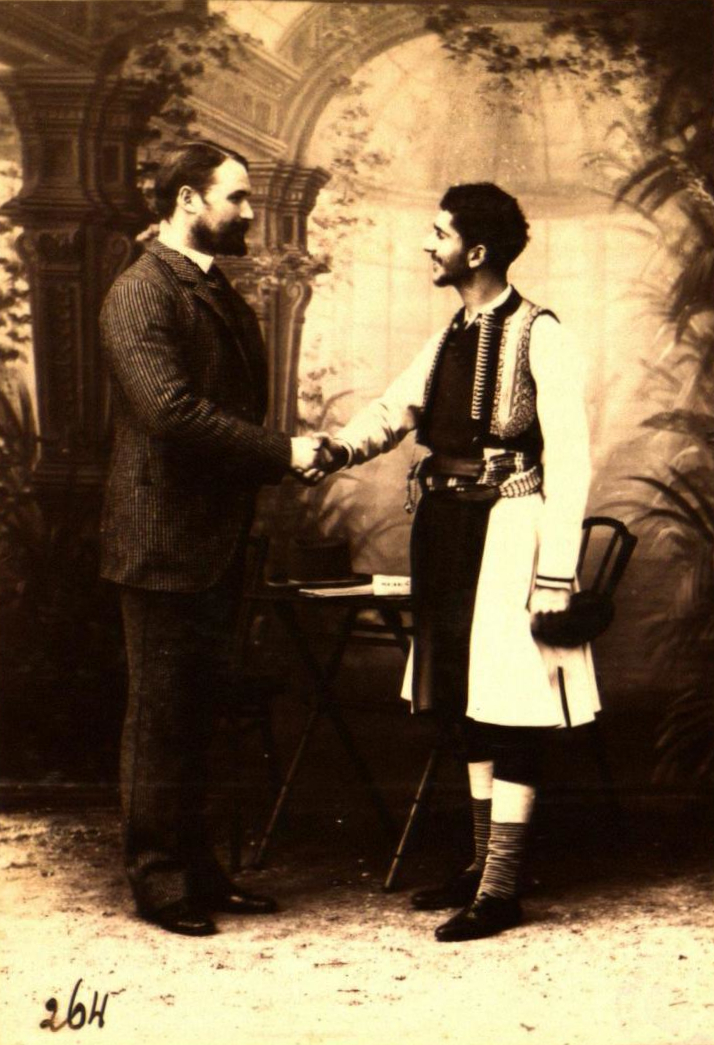
Prince Mirko with his tutor Charles Piguet (ca. 1900)

Prince Mirko Dimitri Petrović-Njegoš of Montenegro (Serbian Cyrillic: Мирко Петровић-Његош; 17 April 1879 – 3 March 1918) was born in Cetinje, the second son of King Nicholas I of Montenegro and Milena Vukotić. Prince Mirko predeceased his father and his elder brother Crown Prince Danilo.

== Marriage ==
On 25 July 1902 in Cetinje, Prince Mirko married Natalija Konstantinović (10 October 1882 in Trieste – 21 August 1950 in Paris), daughter of Colonel Alexander Konstantinović (1848–1914) and Milena Opuić from Trieste. She was the granddaughter of Aleksandar Konstantinović (1803–1858) and Princess Anka Obrenović (1 April 1821 – murdered, Belgrade, 10 June 1868), daughter of Jevrem Obrenović (1790 – 20 September 1856), younger brother of Miloš Obrenović I, Prince of Serbia (1816), and Tomanija Bogicević (1796 – 13 June 1881).

The couple had five sons before divorcing in October 1917:

- Prince Šćepac (Stephan) (27 August 1903 in Cetinje – 15 March 1908 in Cannes)
- Prince Stanislaw (30 January 1905 in Cetinje – 4 January 1908 in Kotor)
- Prince Michael (14 September 1908 in Podgorica – 24 March 1986 in Paris), he married in Paris on 27 January 1941 Geneviève Denise Charlotte Prigent (4 December 1919, in Saint-Brieuc – 26 January 1990, in Lannion), second daughter of Dr. François Marie Prigent (Fontenay-sous-Bois, 8 March 1883 - Saint-Brieuc, 20 August 1947). They had one son:
  - Nicholas, Prince of Montenegro On 27 November 1976 in Trébeurden, Côtes-du-Nord, he married Francine Navarro (Casablanca, 27 January 1950 – Paris, 6 August 2008). They had two children:
    - Princess Altinaï of Montenegro, born at Les Lilas, Seine-Saint-Denis on 27 October 1977. She is a filmmaker and married Russian violinist Anton Martynov on 12 May 2009. They had one son:
      - Nikolai Martynov (born 30 September 2009)
    - Boris, Hereditary Prince of Montenegro, Grand-Duke (Voivode) of Grahovo and Zeta, born at Les Lilas on 21 January 1980. He is a creative director at Renault France and married architect Véronique Haillot Canas da Silva (b. São Sebastião da Pedreira, Lisbon, 27 July 1976; daughter of António Canas da Silva and Anne Haillot) on 12 May 2007. They have two daughters:
      - Miléna (b. Maternité des Lilas, Seine-Saint-Denis, France, 11 February 2008)
      - Antonia (b. 2013)
- Prince Pavle (Paul) (16 May 1910 in Podgorica – June 1933)
- Prince Emmanuel (10 June 1912 in Cetinje – 26 March 1928 in Biarritz).

Their eldest surviving son Prince Michael of Montenegro, succeeded Mirko in the Montenegrin royal succession and would become head of the House of Petrović-Njegoš and pretender to the Montenegrin throne.

== Serbian throne ==
As Prince Mirko's wife was the granddaughter of Anka (Anna) Obrenović, a member of the Serbian House of Obrenović, it was agreed with the Serbian Government that Prince Mirko would be proclaimed Crown Prince of Serbia in the event that the marriage of King Alexander and Draga Mašin was childless.

Following the assassination of Alexander and Draga in 1903, the resulting conferral of the crown was given to Peter Karađorđević, his brother-in-law. In 1911 he joined the Black Hand "Unity or Death" secret society which sought the unification of all Serbs in the Balkans, especially those under Austria-Hungary.

== Death ==
Mirko divorced his wife in 1917. He moved from Paris to Vienna, where he died in 1918. Following his death, his ten-year-old son Prince Michael of Montenegro was raised in Paris by his mother and the residual members of the exiled Montenegrin Royal Family. In 1921 following the death of Mirko's father and shortly afterwards by the renouncement of the defunct throne by former Crown Prince Danilo, the thirteen-year-old Prince Michael of Montenegro became the head of the Petrović-Njegoš house, albeit initially under a pretense regency.
