= Petar Vukotić =

Montenegrin voivode and senator (1826-1903)

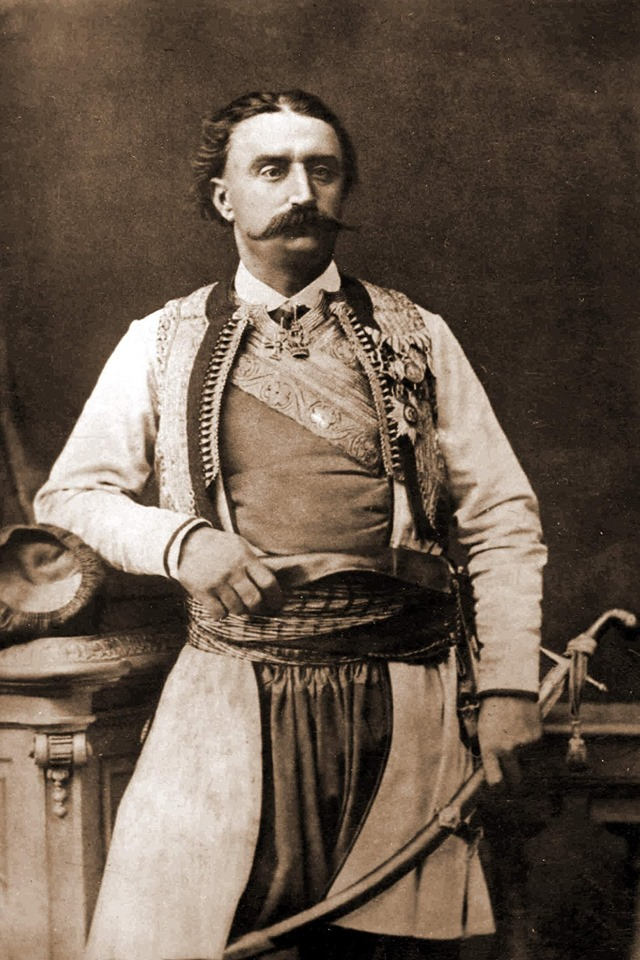
Photograph of Petar Vukotić, c. 1900

Petar Vukotić (Serbian Cyrillic: Петар Вукотић, 14 December 1826 – 30 January 1903) was a Montenegrin voivode and senator who participated in the Montenegrin–Ottoman War (1852–53) and Montenegrin–Ottoman War (1876–78), notably at the great victory at Vučji Do (18 July 1876).

== Life ==
Born in Ozrinići or Čevo, he was the son of Montenegrins serdar Stevan Perkov Vukotić and wife Stana Milić. With wife Jelena Vojvodić, born in the village of Viš, Danilovgrad, Montenegro, daughter of Tadija Vojvodić and wife Milica Pavićević, he had the sons Šale, Matan and Šćepan (nicknamed Šarac), and daughter Milena. He was one of the greatest landowners in Montenegro and a close friend of Vojvoda Mirko Petrović-Njegoš with whom he had fought in the wars of the 1850s. The two friends decided to consolidate their alliance with the union of their children. In 1853, Milena, age only six, was betrothed to Mirko's only son, Nikola, age twelve. Nikola was the nephew and heir of the childless reigning prince of Montenegro Danilo I. Milena had twelve children, including Elena, who married Victor Emmanuel III of Italy.

After the wars in the 1870s, he settled in Cetinje and was for a time Vice President of the Senate and Chief of the Prince′s Bodyguard.

His death was announced by Reuters on 30 January 1903.
