= Princess Zorka of Montenegro =

Montenegrin princess (1864–1890)

Princess Zorka Karađorđević
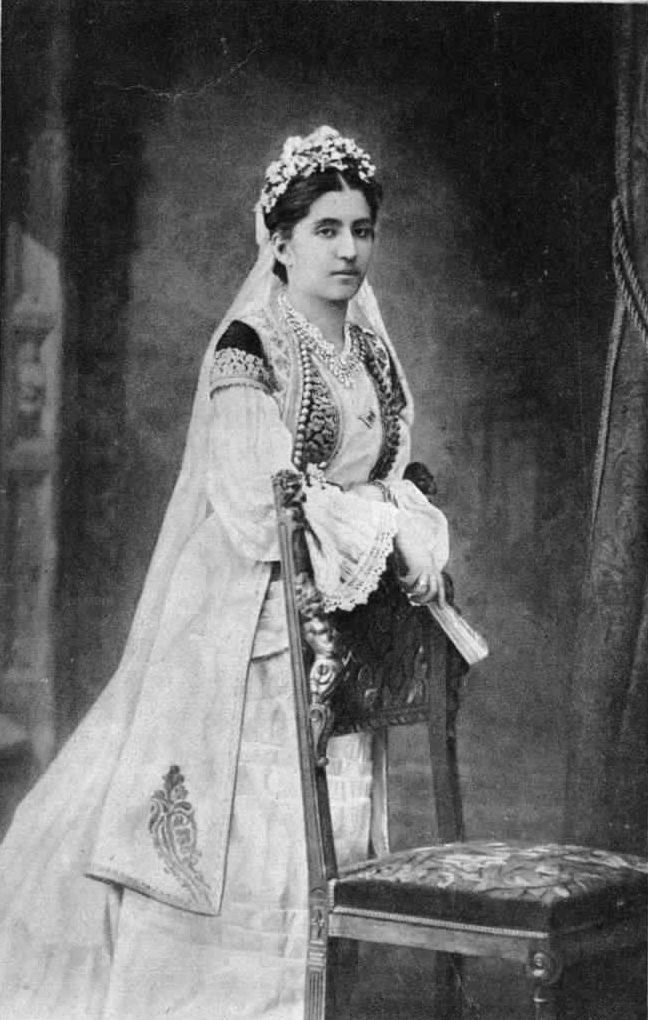
- Wedding portrait of Princess Zorka of Montenegro in 1883
- Born: 23 December 1864; Cetinje, Montenegro
- Died: 16 March 1890 (aged 25); Cetinje, Montenegro
- Burial: St. George's Church, Topola, Serbia
- Spouse: Prince Peter Karađorđević (m. 1883)
- Issue: Helen, Princess of Russia; Princess Milena; George, Crown Prince of Serbia; Alexander I of Yugoslavia; Prince Andrew
Names
- Ljubica Petrović-Njegoš, changed to Zorka, married Karađorđević
- House: Petrović-Njegoš (by birth); Karađorđević (by marriage)
- Father: Nicholas I of Montenegro
- Mother: Milena Vukotić

Zorka Karađorđević (Serbian: Зорка Карађорђевић, 1864–1890), née Petrović-Njegoš (Петровић-Његош), was a Montenegrin princess, the eldest child of Prince Nicholas I of the Petrović-Njegoš dynasty. In 1883, Ljubica married Serbian prince and throne claimant Petar Karađorđević. She died in childbirth while giving birth to her fifth child, Andrija, on 16 March 1890. Prince Andrija died shortly thereafter. Zorka's husband later became king of Serbia as Peter I.

== Life ==
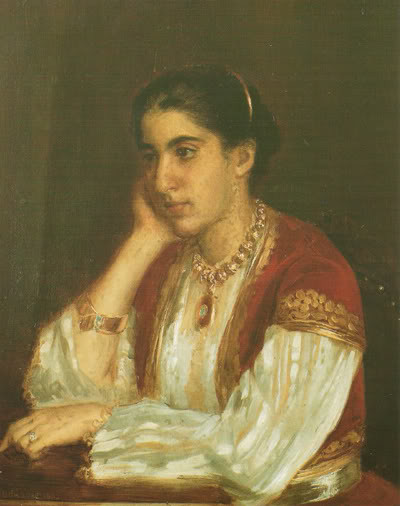
Portrait of Zorka, by Vlaho Bukovac, 1888

Born in Cetinje, Montenegro, at the time when her father was already the reigning Prince of Montenegro (his uncle Danilo II Petrović-Njegoš having died in 1860). Although born as Ljubica, her name was changed to Zorka (Serbian name derived from "dawn") by her godfather, Mihailo Obrenović, Prince of Serbia, on her christening day, with an intention that symbolizes "the dawn of new time". She had eight younger sisters and three younger brothers. She spent her childhood up to the age of 11 in Cetinje, where she was educated by local teachers and a Swiss governess, Luisa Neukomm von Hallau (1845–1932). In 1875, Zorka was sent to Russia to continue her education at the Smolny Institute (attended by the girls from the most prominent Russian aristocratic families). After graduation, she returned to Cetinje. At the beginning of 1883, Serbian throne claimant Petar Karađorđević moved to Cetinje, with the intention to marry, get closer to the Montenegrins and settle down with his family. He asked for the hand of the young and beautiful princess. His arrival and engagement to Zorka were disapproved by the opponents of these two dynasties in Serbia and Montenegro, but the act was gladly accepted by the Serbian and Montenegrin people, who saw it as the confirmation of their bond. The wedding of Princess Zorka (19 at the time) and Petar Karađorđević (39) took place at the Cetinje Monastery on 30 July 1883. The wedding party, like the engagement before it, was organized according to folk tradition, with many guests who could barely accommodate themselves in the small space of Cetinje.

Zorka's sister Elena married the future King Victor Emmanuel III of Italy.

== Marriage and children ==
Described as "exuberant" by one commentator, Zorka married Petar Karađorđević in Cetinje on 11 August 1883 in an Orthodox ceremony.

They had five children:

- Jelena (or "Helen", 1884–1962).
- Milena (28 April 1886–21 December 1887).
- Đorđe (or "George", 1887–1972), Serbian crown prince, renounced claim in 1909.
- Aleksandar (or "Alexander", 1888–1934), Serbian prince.
- Andrija (or "Andrew", born and died 16 March 1890).

== Death ==
Zorka died aged 25 on 16 March 1890 in Cetinje during childbirth. At first, she was buried in the Cetinje Monastery until 1912, afterwards her remains were transmitted to the St. George's Church, Topola, Kingdom of Serbia.

On her deathbed, Zorka reportedly told her husband: He will become King! (Biće kralj!). This statement became prophetic 13 years later when her husband ascended to the Serbian throne following the May Coup (Serbia).

== Monument ==
The first monument for a woman in Serbia was erected for Zorka on 3 June 1926. The monument, a work of sculptor Stamenko Đurđević, was funded by the Duchess Zorka Society and was located on the Big Kalemegdan. The monument was removed and probably destroyed after World War II. The gypsum model of the monument has survived and is housed in the History Museum of Serbia.
