= Order of Petrović Njegoš =

Order of Petrović Njegoš Орден Петровић Његош
- Badge of a Knight of the order

Awarded by the Royal House of Montenegro
- Type: Dynastic order of knighthood
- Established: 1896; 130 years ago
- Royal house: House of Petrović Njegoš
- Eligibility: Members of the Petrović-Njegoš dynasty and their kinsmen
- Awarded for: At the Sovereign's pleasure
- Status: Currently constituted
- Founder: Nikola I
- Sovereign: Nikola II
- Grand Master: Hereditary Prince Boris, Grand Duke of Grahovo and Zeta
- Grades: Knight/Dame
- Post-nominals: OPN

Precedence
- Next (higher): Order of Prince Danilo I
- Next (lower): Order of the Red Cross
- Ribbon bar

The Order of Petrović Njegoš (Montenegrin: Orden Petrović Njegoš; Cyrillic: Орден Петровић Његош) is a dynastic order of the Royal House of Montenegro. It was founded in 1896 by King Nikola I to commemorate two hundred years of rule by the House of Petrović Njegoš, and is the most exclusive of the House's honours, being reserved for members of the dynasty and their kinsmen. Conferred in a single class and described by collectors as extremely rare, it ranks third in precedence among the three principal dynastic orders of the Royal House, after the Order of Saint Peter of Cetinje and the Order of Prince Danilo I.

Following the fall of the monarchy in 1918, the Order ceased to be a state decoration and is today conferred as a private house order under the fons honorum held by the Head of the Royal House of Montenegro. In 2011 the Parliament of Montenegro adopted the Law on the Status of the Descendants of the Petrović Njegoš Dynasty, recognising a non-political role for the Royal House in the cultural life of the country.

== History ==
=== Foundation ===
The Order was instituted in 1896 by King Nikola I to mark the bicentenary of Petrović-Njegoš rule. Montenegro had been governed by elective prince-bishops (vladikas) from 1516, by hereditary prince-bishops of the Petrović-Njegoš family from 1696, and, after the secularisation of the office under Prince Danilo I in 1852, as a hereditary principality and, from 1910, a kingdom. The year of the Order's foundation was one of unusual dynastic significance: in the same year King Nikola's fifth daughter, Princess Elena, married Prince Victor Emmanuel of Savoy, heir to the Italian throne, drawing the small principality closer to the courts of Western Europe.

The Order was conceived less as a reward for service than as an emblem of the dynasty itself. From its foundation it was bestowed almost exclusively upon members of the Petrović Njegoš family and their kinsmen, a usage that distinguishes it sharply from the broader Order of Prince Danilo I, which was open to the military, statesmen and foreign dignitaries.

=== Revival ===
Dormant since the deposition of the dynasty in 1918 and its subsequent exile, the Order was brought out of abeyance in 2008 by the Head of the Royal House, to mark the passage of three hundred years since the accession of the first Petrović Njegoš ruler. Since the recognition of the Royal House's cultural role under the 2011 law, the dynastic orders of the House, of which the Order of Petrović Njegoš is the most senior in exclusivity, are administered from the Podgorica Royal Palace.

== Insignia ==
=== Badge ===
The badge of the Order takes the form of a cross of gilt and enamel, set upon a field of gold rays and resting within a green enamelled laurel wreath; the cross itself is enamelled in the red and white of the Montenegrin national colours. The badge measures approximately 30 by 40 mm.

On the obverse, the upper arm of the cross bears the Cyrillic initial Д (D), for Danilo I, the first hereditary prince-bishop of the house, while the lower arm bears Н I (N I), for Nikola I. The two transverse arms carry the dates of the bicentenary, 1696 and 1896. The reverse of the badge is plain and concave.

=== Collar ===
Collar of the Order of Petrović Njegoš

The Order possesses a collar of exceptional richness, in the tradition of the great European dynastic collar-orders such as the Order of the Golden Fleece and the Order of the Elephant. Worked in gold and enamel, the collar is composed of a series of linked plaques alternating the crowned double-headed eagle of Montenegro, radiant or sunburst medallions charged with crosses, and enamelled armorial elements. From the collar depends a large central jewel: a crowned double-headed eagle surmounting a rosette-shaped badge set with miniature portraits of the sovereigns of the dynasty arranged about a central medallion, the whole bordered with coloured stones. The collar is the grandest expression of the Order's insignia and is associated with the Sovereign and the senior members of the Royal House.

=== Ribbon ===
The badge was traditionally worn from a triangular ribbon of the Austrian fashion (described by Romanoff as "triangular ribbon type IV"), in the red and white of Montenegro, though it is currently hung from a vertical ribbon. Suspension is by a thin link attached directly to the reverse of the badge.

== Composition and conferral ==
The Order is constituted in a single class. Conferral is reserved, by the usage of the House, to members of the Petrović-Njegoš dynasty and their kinsmen, and the Order is regarded as the most personal and exclusive of the family's honours. Surviving examples are correspondingly few, and the Order is classed by specialists as extremely rare.

== Precedence ==
Within the order of precedence of the dynastic orders of the Royal House of Montenegro, the Order of Petrović-Njegoš ranks third, following the Order of Saint Peter of Cetinje and the Order of Prince Danilo I. Its seniority reflects its character as the dynasty's own commemorative honour rather than the breadth of its membership, which is the narrowest of the three.

== Sovereign and Grand Master ==
The Sovereign of the Order is the Head of the Royal House of Montenegro, presently Prince Nikola II. The office of Grand Master is held by his son and heir, Hereditary Prince Boris, Grand Duke of Grahovo and Zeta.

== See also ==
- Petrović-Njegoš dynasty
- Order of Saint Peter of Cetinje
- Order of Prince Danilo I
- Order of the Red Cross (Montenegro)
- Orders, decorations, and medals of Montenegro
