= Podgorica Royal Palace =

Royal residence in Podgorica, Montenegro

- Дворац Петровића (Montenegrin)
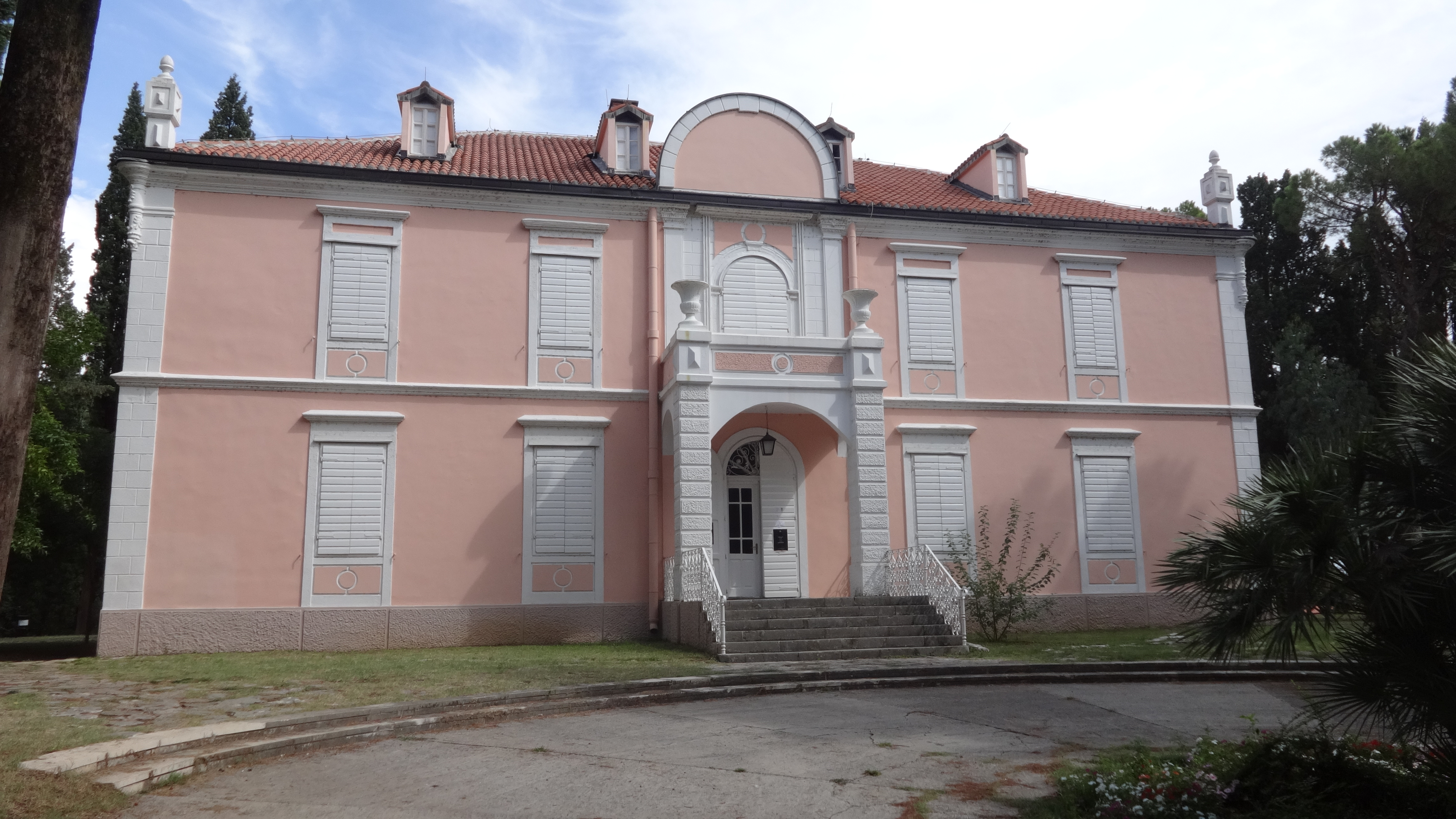
- Front view and main entrance
- Interactive map of the Podgorica Royal Palace area
- Former names: Petrović Castle; Kruševac
- Alternative names: Petrović Palace

General information
- Status: Cultural property of Montenegro
- Type: Royal residence; museum complex
- Architectural style: Historicist
- Location: Kruševac, Podgorica, Montenegro
- Coordinates: 42°26′16″N 19°15′01″E
- Current tenants: Museum of Contemporary Art of Montenegro; Petrović Njegoš Foundation
- Construction started: 1891
- Completed: 1894
- Owner: Descendants of the Petrović-Njegoš dynasty (from 15 August 2026)

Technical details
- Material: Stone
- Floor count: 2

Podgorica Royal Palace, also known as the Petrović Palace or Kruševac (Montenegrin: Дворац Петровића / Дворац "Крушевац"), is the official residence and administrative headquarters of the Royal House of Montenegro in Podgorica. It was built between 1891 and 1894 by King Nicholas I of Montenegro as a winter residence for the Montenegrin royal family. During the Balkan Wars the buildings were converted into a hospital, a function they served for decades.

Today, the palace forms part of the Petrović complex, which houses the Petrović Palace Contemporary Art Centre, an exhibition space of the Museum of Contemporary Art of Montenegro. Amendments to the Law on the Status of the Descendants of the Petrović Njegoš Dynasty, adopted by the Parliament of Montenegro on 1 June 2026 and voted upon again on 31 July 2026, transfer ownership of the palace and its appurtenant land to the descendants of the dynasty with effect from 15 August 2026. The resident cultural institutions may continue to operate in the building against payment of rent until a dedicated museum of contemporary art is built, and the palace may not be sold or otherwise alienated except to the State of Montenegro. The palace serves as the seat of the Petrović Njegoš Foundation, presided over by the head of the House of Petrović-Njegoš, Nicholas, Prince of Montenegro.

== History ==
=== Site and construction (1891–1894) ===
The palace was raised on Kruševac, a then-isolated elevation near the right bank of the Morača that had belonged to the Milonjić, Zlatičanin and Harović families. Construction began shortly after Podgorica passed from Ottoman to Montenegrin control, the foundation stone being laid on 20 April 1891. King Nikola I commissioned the building as a representative residence for his son, Prince Mirko Petrović-Njegoš.

The palace was built to the design of an unidentified architect, using local craftsmen, with the engineer Marko Đukanović directing the works. The main residence was erected in 1891-92, and the wider complex, comprising the palace, the House of the King's Guard (Perjanički dom) and the court chapel, was completed in 1894.

=== Expansion and grounds (1905–1910) ===
The complex was enlarged in the years before the Balkan Wars. Landscaping of the extensive park began in 1905, alongside the addition of an upper storey to the palace and of an auxiliary kitchen building. In 1906 work was carried out on the façades and on a staircase, columns and a terrace on the western front, and in 1908 the outbuildings and stable were substantially rebuilt and electric lighting was installed. At the end of 1910 a "Pavilion for Flower Cultivation", the botanical garden, was added to the designs of the French architect André Saffrey, again with local labour.

=== Balkan Wars and hospital use ===
During the Balkan Wars (1912–1913) the palace and its outbuildings were converted into a hospital. In 1919 the American Red Cross thoroughly renovated Prince Mirko's residence at Kruševac, turning it into a hospital and using it as its headquarters. The buildings continued to serve a medical function for decades, with hospital use recorded at the site until 1974.

=== Non-Aligned gallery (1984–1995) ===
In 1984 the entire complex was revitalised and converted into exhibition spaces. On 1 September 1984, the twentieth anniversary of the Non-Aligned Movement's Cairo conference, the Gallery of Art of the Non-Aligned Countries "Josip Broz Tito" was inaugurated in the palace, then in Titograd (as Podgorica was known in socialist Yugoslavia). It was the only art institution established directly under the auspices of the Non-Aligned Movement.

Over its eleven years the gallery assembled a collection of roughly 800 works from 56 non-aligned and developing countries, with significant donations from states including India, Egypt, Bolivia, Cuba and Cyprus, and mounted exhibitions of art from across Africa, Asia and Latin America. The gallery ceased to operate as an independent institution amid the breakup of Yugoslavia in 1995.

=== Centre and Museum of Contemporary Art ===
On 4 April 1995 the Centre for Contemporary Art of Montenegro was created through the merger of the Republic Cultural Centre and the Non-Aligned gallery, inheriting the latter's collection. On 31 March 2023 the Government of Montenegro transformed the Centre into the Museum of Contemporary Art of Montenegro (MCAM). The museum holds the former Non-Aligned collection, described as unmatched in south-eastern Europe, together with its own holdings of modern and contemporary Montenegrin and regional art, and operates three exhibition spaces: the Petrović Palace, the House of the King's Guard and the museum's principal gallery. A purpose-built museum on the site of the former Morača Barracks has been proposed to house the institution in the longer term.

=== Rehabilitation of the dynasty ===
Following the restoration of Montenegrin independence in 2006, the state took a series of steps to rehabilitate the royal house. The Law on the Status of the Descendants of the Petrović Njegoš Dynasty, adopted in 2011, provided for the moral and material rehabilitation of the dynasty and established the Petrović Njegoš Foundation, chaired by Nicholas, Prince of Montenegro. In January 2012 the first floor of the palace was granted to the Foundation for its use.

On 1 June 2026 the Parliament of Montenegro adopted amendments to the 2011 law. The law was voted upon again at the sitting of 31 July 2026, promulgated by President Jakov Milatović by decree of 3 August 2026, published in the Official Gazette of Montenegro no. 117/2026 of 7 August 2026 under registry number 2111, and came into force on 15 August 2026. The amendments give the palace and its appurtenant land into the ownership of the descendants of the dynasty, in place of the right of exclusive use of part of the building granted in 2011, and provide for its reconstruction, furnishing and maintenance at state expense from the capital budget. The palace may not be sold or otherwise alienated by the descendants except to the State of Montenegro, at a price determined as at the date of acquisition. Institutions resident in the building may continue their activities there, against a rent set by the state authority responsible for culture, until a dedicated museum of contemporary art is built.

== Architecture and grounds ==
Most of the complex dates from the late 19th century and holds the status of a cultural property of Montenegro. The residential ensemble is built largely of stone and is set within a large landscaped park, and is regarded as among the most distinctive exhibition settings in Podgorica.

=== The palace ===
The two-storey palace is the principal building of the complex. Its representative form dates to the original campaign of 1891-94, with the upper floor, western terrace, staircase and colonnade added in the landscaping works of 1905-06.

=== House of the King's Guard ===
The House of the King's Guard (Perjanički dom), named for the perjanici, King Nikola's ceremonial guard, formed part of the original 1894 complex and today serves as one of the Museum of Contemporary Art's exhibition spaces.

=== Church of Saint Demetrius ===
Within the complex stands the Church of Saint Demetrius, built in 1894 as the family chapel of King Nikola I. Constructed of dressed stone with a dome and a quadrangular bell tower, it was the work of the mason Miloš Lepetić.

=== Botanical garden ===
The "Pavilion for Flower Cultivation", which gives the complex its botanical garden, was built at the end of 1910 to the design of the French architect André Saffrey.

=== Park and Music Chapel ===
The palace stands in an extensive park whose formal landscaping began in 1905. In 1997 an open-air structure for musical events, the Music Chapel (Muzička kapela), was added; operating as part of the museum, it hosts concerts, theatrical performances and other events.

== The complex today ==
The palace complex functions simultaneously as a museum venue and as the seat of the royal Foundation. The Museum of Contemporary Art of Montenegro uses the palace and the House of the King's Guard for exhibitions, while the first floor of the palace has served as the offices of the Petrović Njegoš Foundation since 2012. Under the 2026 amending law, in force from 15 August 2026, ownership of the palace passes to the descendants of the dynasty, and the museum's continued use of the building is to be governed by a rental arrangement pending the construction of a new museum building.

== See also ==
- Petrović-Njegoš dynasty
- "Josip Broz Tito" Art Gallery of the Nonaligned Countries
- Law on the Status of the Descendants of the Petrović Njegoš Dynasty
- King Nikola's Palace, Cetinje
