= Order of Prince Danilo I =

Dynastic order of Montenegro

Order of Prince Danilo I Орден Књаза Данила I
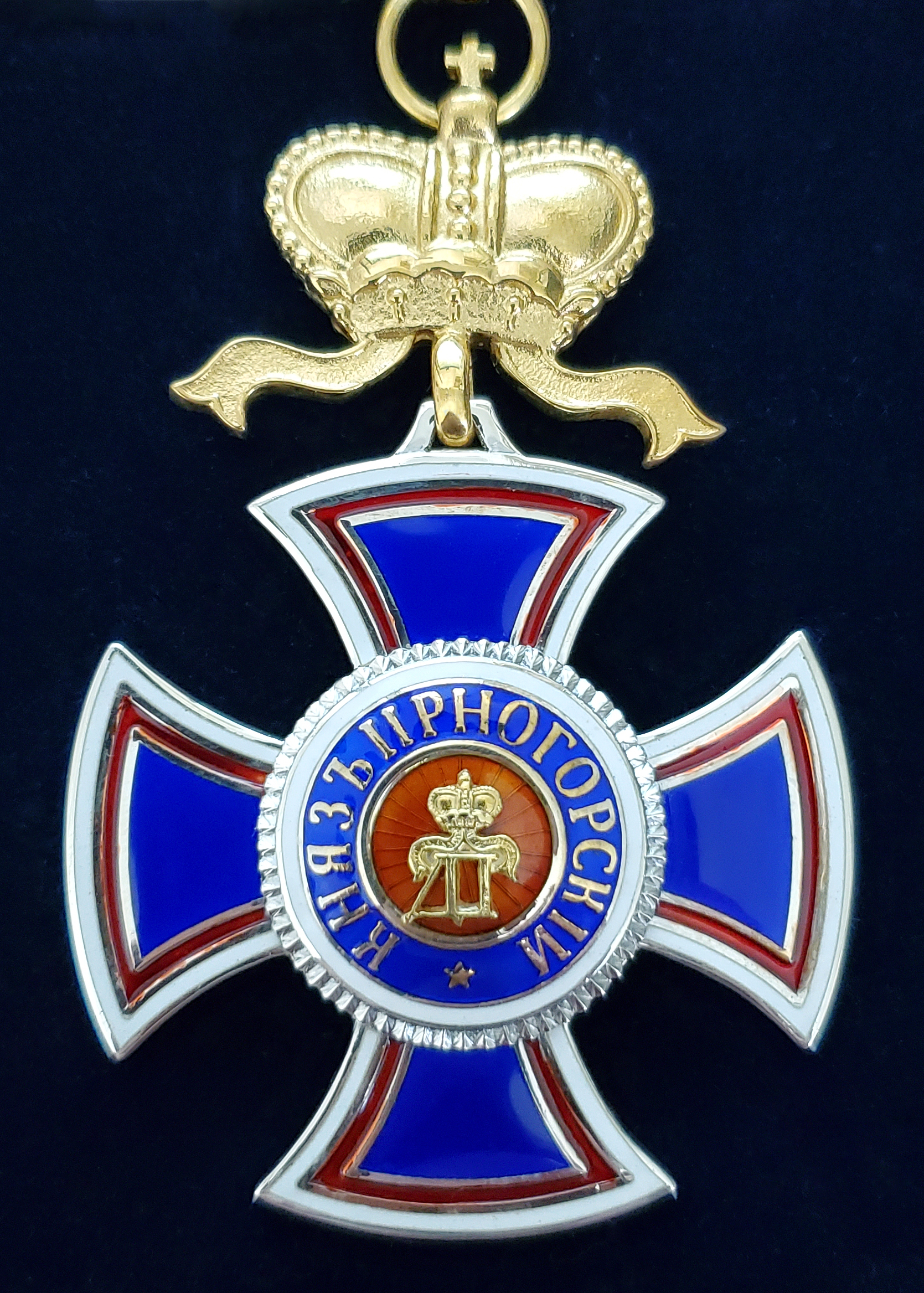
- Badge of a Member of the order

Awarded by the Royal House of Montenegro
- Type: Dynastic order of knighthood (formerly a state order)
- Established: 23 April (5 May) 1853 (Note: The founding statutes as reproduced from Dušan Vuksan, "Sitni prilozi", Zapisi VIII (1937), pp. 122–123, are dated Na Cetinju na Đurđev-dan 23. aprila 1853. god. (Kapičić 2026, p. 17). Kapičić's introduction, on the basis of the archival record, gives the foundation as 24 April, that is 5 May, 1852, with Vienna as the place of manufacture (Kapičić 2026, p. 15). St George's Day, 23 April O.S., fell on 5 May N.S. in the nineteenth century, so the day is common to both; the year is not. The current Statute of the order deems it continuous from 23 April (5 May) 1853 (Statute 2026, preamble and art. 31). The insignia bear the dates 1852–3.)
- Country: Principality of Montenegro (1853–1910); Kingdom of Montenegro (1910–1918); Montenegro (dynastic order)
- Motto: За независимост Црне Горе (Za nezavisnost Crne Gore, "For the Independence of Montenegro")
- Eligibility: Open to nationals and foreigners
- Awarded for: Merit, in the discretion of the Grand Master; dedicated to the independence of Montenegro
- Status: Currently constituted
- Founder: Danilo I
- Sovereign: Nikola II
- Grand Master: Hereditary Prince Boris, Grand Duke of Grahovo and Zeta
- Grades: Collar; Knight or Dame Grand Cross (1st class); Knight or Dame Commander (2nd class); Knight or Dame (3rd class); Lieutenant (4th class); Member (5th class)
- Former grades: Single class (1853–1861)

Precedence
- Next (higher): Order of Saint Peter of Cetinje
- Next (lower): Order of Petrović Njegoš
- Ribbon bar

The Order of Prince Danilo I (Montenegrin: Orden Knjaza Danila I; Cyrillic: Орден Књаза Данила I), founded as the Order of Merit for the Independence of Montenegro (Red zasluga za nezavisimost Crne Gore) and also known as the Order of Danilo I or the Order of Independence, is a Montenegrin order instituted at Cetinje on St George's Day, 23 April 1853 (O.S.; 5 May N.S.), by Prince Danilo I, the first secular ruler of Montenegro, following the successful defence of the country against the Ottoman Empire in the war of 1852–1853. It was the first order instituted by the Montenegrin state and remained its senior award for merit throughout the Principality (1852–1910) and the Kingdom of Montenegro (1910–1918). Its motto, За независимост Црне Горе ("For the Independence of Montenegro"), unites the founder's name with what its historian has called the basic credo of the Montenegrin national programme.

Following the fall of the monarchy in 1918, the Order has been maintained as a dynastic order of the Royal House of Montenegro. It is conferred by the head of the house, who is its Sovereign, or in his name by the Grand Master, and is governed by a Statute published in the Government gazette of Montenegro under the Law on the Status of the Descendants of the Petrović Njegoš Dynasty. It comprises a Collar and five classes and is conferred on persons of merit, Montenegrin or foreign, women being admitted on the same footing as men. Its founding day is kept on 5 May.

== History ==
=== Background ===
Montenegro's first decorations were the two medals instituted by the prince-bishop Petar II Petrović-Njegoš: the Medal for Bravery, first struck in 1841 from old church silver after a Turkish attack on the Bjelopavlići, and the gold Obilić Medal, designed by Anastas Jovanović at the turn of 1846 and 1847 and named for the Kosovo hero Miloš Obilić. Both were awarded for the highest bravery in the field, and between the first medal of 1841 and 1895 Montenegro possessed five official decorations in all.

Njegoš died in 1851. His successor Danilo declined episcopal consecration and in 1852 assumed the secular title of Prince (knjaz), separating the temporal and spiritual authority that the prince-bishops had combined since 1697. The Ottoman Empire refused to recognise the change, and the war of the winter of 1852–1853, in which an Ottoman army under Omer Pasha advanced into Montenegro before being halted by Austrian and Russian diplomatic intervention, was, in the words of the order's modern historian, the decisive impulse for the foundation of an order. The foundation of an order was, for a newly independent Balkan state, an assertion of sovereignty in itself: it signalled to the European courts that Montenegro possessed its own laws, its own history and the right to reward service to the state.

=== Foundation (1853) ===
The founding statutes, headed Štatuti reda zasluga za nezavisimost Crne Gore (Statutes of the Order of Merit for the Independence of Montenegro), were issued at Cetinje on St George's Day, 23 April 1853 (O.S.), over the signature of "Danilo I, Prince of Montenegro and the Brda". In the preamble the Prince declares that the order is founded "to reward the bravery and merits of our subjects and of all those who have devoted themselves to the defence of the holy cause, the independence of the fatherland". The four articles provided that every member should receive a decoration consisting of a single silver cross, "recalling by its form the cross upon which the human race was redeemed at Calvary", inscribed at the crossing on one side Danil I Knjaz Crne Gore and on the other Za nezavisimost Crne Gore; that it should be worn on the gunj or any other dress from a white ribbon with a red stripe at each edge; that a model should be deposited in the archive of the Senate; and that the names of all members should be inscribed in a great book bound in gold, "so that the memory of their good deeds and their merits may be perpetuated".

The order had a single class at its foundation. The names of the first engravers and makers are not recorded, and the tradition that Anastas Jovanović had a hand in its design is regarded as unproven, though Jovanović was among its first recipients: Danilo sent him the cross with a letter describing it as "one newly designed cross in memory of the independence of Montenegro". The crude execution of the first crosses led the Prince to commission a more refined design, which is the one seen on contemporary portraits of Danilo himself, of the President of the Senate Pero Tomov Petrović, of the Vice-President Đorđije Petrović-Njegoš and of the Russian consul at Dubrovnik, Jeremija Gagić.

The order takes its name from its founder, who is reckoned Danilo I as the first ruling Prince of Montenegro, though he is sometimes numbered Danilo II within the House of Petrović-Njegoš after Metropolitan Danilo (r. 1697–1735), the dynasty's founder. (Note: The founder is styled "Prince Danilo I" in the name of the order and on its insignia. Montenegrin usage occasionally refers to him as Danilo II, counting the Metropolitan Danilo Petrović-Njegoš (1670–1735) as Danilo I.)

=== Reorganisation under Nikola I ===
Danilo I was assassinated at Kotor in August 1860 and was succeeded by his nephew Nikola I. Under him the order underwent three reorganisations, in 1861, 1873 and 1893. A year after his accession Nikola added a first and a third class to the original knight's cross, and in 1873 a second class was introduced. By statute the number of knights was unlimited; the order was conferred "for services rendered to the State, to its Ruler, and to all mankind", and the insignia became the property of the recipient and were not returned to the Chancery on the knight's death.

The final change was made by a decree of 22 April 1893, published in Glas Crnogorca two days later. Reciting the statutes of 1853, the Prince declared it "good and expedient" to augment the order by one further class: the knight's class, hitherto the fourth, became the fifth, its existing holders remaining knights without change, and a new fourth class was established with a smaller cross of the same form, devices and colours as the third, to be worn on the left breast. A knight promoted to the new fourth class was not to wear the knight's cross at the same time. This produced the structure of five classes that the order retained to the end of the Kingdom and that it holds today.

During the reign of Nikola I the order became the principal instrument of the Montenegrin court's foreign relations, exchanged with the sovereigns and dignitaries of the European powers and widely sought abroad, and it was distributed in large numbers, with the Medal for Zeal, to Montenegrin and foreign guests at the golden jubilee of the Prince's reign and marriage in 1910. Recipients included the Emperors Alexander III of Russia and Nicholas II of Russia, Franz Joseph I of Austria, Queen Victoria, and Christian X of Denmark, together with Serbian statesmen and soldiers, and the inventor Nikola Tesla. It was also conferred on Allied officers during the First World War, and in 1922 the United States Department of War listed it among the foreign decorations accepted by American servicemen.

Montenegro was elevated to a kingdom in 1910, and the order accordingly became a royal order, though it retained its name and motto.

=== Manufacture ===
The insignia were commissioned from a succession of foreign makers. Under Nikola I the Cetinje archives record orders placed with the Viennese jewellers Gebrüder Resch, Vincent Mayer's Söhne and Christian Friedrich Rothe, with Chobillon of Paris and with Hermann Silberberg of Hamburg; the Roman jeweller Domenico Cravanzola is named as a maker in 1901, and in 1910 the Paris house of Fayolle Pouteau supplied "from 150 to 200 officers' and knights' crosses". The scale of the trade is illustrated by an order of April 1910 to Silberberg for 18 crosses of the first class, 25 of the second, 80 of the third, 100 of the fourth and 150 of the fifth, together with 300 Medals for Zeal, at a cost of 20,020 crowns, and by a delivery from Mayer's Söhne in October 1912 of 20 first-class, 30 second-class, 10 third-class, 38 fourth-class and 60 fifth-class insignia. Examples bearing the marks of Mayer's Söhne and Rothe are preserved in the Odlikovanja collection of the Museum of King Nikola at Cetinje. Since 2005 insignia have been made by Thomas Fattorini Ltd of Birmingham.

=== Exile and continuation as a dynastic order ===
Following the Austro-Hungarian occupation of 1916 and the Podgorica Assembly of 1918, which declared Montenegro's union with Serbia, King Nikola I continued to confer the order and the other Montenegrin decorations from exile in France, as the archival record amply shows; after his death in 1921 the practice was continued by Queen Milena and by his grandson Michael, the last Montenegrin king. In September 1920 the government in exile confirmed to the command of the Montenegrin troops at Gaeta the ribbons to be worn with each decoration, including that of the Order of Danilo. The order has since been maintained by the successive heads of the Royal House of Petrović-Njegoš as a dynastic order, that is, one conferred in the personal gift of the head of a royal house rather than by a state.

The dynasty's position in Montenegro was addressed by the Law on the Status of the Descendants of the Petrović Njegoš Dynasty, adopted by the Parliament of Montenegro in 2011, which recognised the historical role of the dynasty and established a foundation to support it. The order's Statute is published in the Official Gazette of Montenegro on the authority of Article 3 of that law. A Statute of the "Danilo Order" was published in 2015, and the present Statute was published on 7 August 2026 repealing the 2015 text. Its preamble recites the foundation of the order on 23 April (5 May) 1853, its confirmation and amendment by the decrees of 1861 and 1873 and by statutes of 1913, 2004 and 2015, and the aim of preserving the values on which the founder based it, dedicating it to the independence of Montenegro. Persons decorated under the 2015 Statute retain their dignities and are entered in the Register according to a correspondence of classes fixed by the Grand Master.

== Sovereign, Grand Master and officers ==
The fons honorum of the order resides in the head of the Royal House of Petrović-Njegoš, its Sovereign, from whom all its honours derive. The present Sovereign is Nikola II, head of the Royal House since 1986.

Beneath the Sovereign stands the Grand Master, who exercises the fons honorum by delegation as fons honorum in actu exercens and by whose decree all dignities, classes, honours, styles, privileges and insignia of the order are conferred, regulated, suspended or withdrawn. The Grand Mastership is inseparable from the dynastic authority of the house: on the death, abdication, resignation or permanent incapacity of the Grand Master it passes by operation of law to the lawful dynastic heir, no person outside the dynasty may hold it, and where the heir is a minor or otherwise prevented the head of the dynasty may by decree provide for its interim exercise. Since 5 May 2026 the office has been held by the Sovereign's son and heir, Boris, Hereditary Prince of Montenegro.

The Grand Master appoints the officers of the order, who serve at his pleasure. The principal officers are the Deputy Grand Master, the Grand Chancellor, the Deputy Grand Chancellor, the Registrar, the Treasurer and the Herald. The Deputy Grand Master exercises the Grand Master's powers pro tempore in his absence or incapacity, in a fiduciary capacity and subject to the authority of the head of the dynasty, but may not while so acting amend the Statute, create classes or offices, admit or promote members, or alienate the property of the order. The Grand Chancellor has custody of the statutes, registers, seals and archives, and the Grand Chancellery keeps the Register of members, recording each member's name, class, date of decree and date of investiture. Letters Patent for the first and second classes are issued under the hand of the Grand Master, and for the remaining classes under the hand of the Grand Chancellor.

== Classes ==
The order comprises the Collar and five classes. The five-class structure was fixed by the decree of 1893 and has been retained under successive statutes. There is no limit on the number of members, a rule that has applied since the Principality. A member advanced to a higher class ceases to wear the insignia of the class previously held, a rule first laid down in the decree of 1893.

Classes of the Order of Prince Danilo I
| Class | English designation | Montenegrin designation | Established | Insignia |
|---|---|---|---|---|
| Collar | Collar | Огрлица / Ogrlica | | Collar from which the badge is suspended, worn on the founding day and at dynastic, state and ecclesiastical ceremonies |
| I | Knight or Dame Grand Cross | Витез или Дама Великог крста / Vitez ili Dama Velikog krsta | 1861 | Badge on a white sash 10 cm wide bordered in red, worn over the right shoulder; star on the left breast |
| II | Knight or Dame Commander | Витез или Дама Командор / Vitez ili Dama Komandor | 1873 | Badge at the neck on a ribbon about 6 cm wide; star on the left breast |
| III | Knight or Dame | Витез или Дама / Vitez ili Dama | 1861 | Badge at the neck |
| IV | Lieutenant | Лајтнант / Lieutenant | 1893 | As the third class, of reduced dimensions |
| V | Member | Члан / Član | 1853 (as the sole class; fourth class 1861–1893) | Smaller cross on the left breast on a ribbon about 4 cm wide |

The Collar is the supreme dignity of the order and takes precedence over all its other distinctions. It is conferred solely at the discretion of the Grand Master, is not subject to application or recommendation, and is as a rule reserved for heads of reigning and formerly reigning sovereign houses, princes and kinsmen of such houses of equal dynastic rank, and persons who have rendered service in the most exceptional circumstances, as a personal mark of the Grand Master's confidence. It is worn only at dynastic ceremonies or by express command of the Grand Master; on other occasions its holders wear the sash badge and star.

The star of the order is conferred in silver, gold or diamond. With the Grand Cross, the diamond star is reserved for prominent members of sovereign houses, their kinsmen and those who have rendered service in the most exceptional circumstances, and is limited to twenty living holders; the gold star is conferred on persons of exceptional standing and limited to fifty living holders.

== Insignia ==
The original cross of 1853 has arms with rounded edges, the lower arm longer than the others, and a surface worked in a lattice ornament. Its obverse carries a circular medallion with the relief inscription ДАНІИЛЪ I. ЦРНОГОРСКИ / КНЯЗЪ ЦРНОГОРСКИИ, and its reverse ЗА НЕЗАВИСИМОСТЬ ЦРНЕ ГОРЕ / 1852–3.

The badge of the first, second and third classes, as settled after 1861, is a silver cross with four arms of equal length and rounded edges, enamelled on both sides in blue within a red and white border, and surmounted by a gold Montenegrin crown. The obverse medallion bears, on a red enamelled field, the crowned initials ДI in relief with a small gold five-pointed star beneath; the reverse medallion bears the date 1852.3 on a red field within a blue ring inscribed ЗА НЕЗАВИСИМОСТЬ ЦРНЕ ГОРЕ. The badge of the fourth class is identical but smaller.

The badge of the fifth class preserves the form of the original cross of 1853: a silver cross with rounded edges and an elongated lower arm, enamelled black on both sides. On the obverse a red enamelled field edged with a silver ring carries, in gold relief lettering, КНЯЗЪ in the centre and ДАНІИЛЪ I. ЦРНОГОРСКИИ around it; the reverse medallion is of the same form, with 1852.3 in the centre and ЗА НЕЗАВИСИМОСТЬ ЦРНЕ ГОРЕ around.

Under the current Statute the badge of the first class is described as a cross of equal arms enamelled blue, bordered in red and white and surmounted by a princely crown with gold elements, bearing at the centre a red enamelled medallion with the crowned cypher ДИ within a blue ring inscribed КНЯЗЪ ЦРНОГОРСКИИ, and on the reverse the date 1852–3 with the inscription ЗА НЕЗАВИСИМОСТЪ ЦРНЕ ГОРЕ; the fifth-class cross is black-enamelled with an elongated lower arm and a red central medallion inscribed ДАНИИЛЪ I. КНЯЗЪ ЦРНОГОРСКИИ. The Collar is composed of linked gold elements alternating princely crowns with representations of the historic arms of Montenegro, with an enlarged representation of the arms at the centre from which the badge is suspended.

The breast star, worn by the first and second classes only, is a silver sixteen-pointed star of eight three-rayed and eight diamond-cut points set alternately, charged with the cross of the order under the Montenegrin crown, with the initials ДАНІИЛЪ I and the inscription КНЯЗЪ ЦРНОГОРСКИИ. The maker's name is engraved on the reverse.

The ribbon of the order is white with a red stripe at each edge. It was prescribed in that form by the founding statutes of 1853 and confirmed unchanged, "as before", by the order on the wearing of decorations issued to the Montenegrin troops at Gaeta on 14 September 1920, which fixed the ribbons of all the Montenegrin decorations then in use. The current Statute prescribes for the first class a broad white sash ten centimetres wide bordered by narrow red bands. Insignia are worn in accordance with established European and dynastic usage; miniatures, rosettes and ribbon bars may be worn with evening, civil or uniform dress, and women wear the insignia in the customary form, including the bow where appropriate.

== Ribbon bars ==
Ribbon bars of the order
| Knight Grand Cross (1°) | Knight Commander (2°) | Knight (3°) | Lieutenant (4°) | Member (5°) |

== Appointment and eligibility ==
=== Under the Principality and Kingdom ===
The order was administered by a Chancery of the Princely Orders (Kancelarija knjaževskih ordena) at Cetinje. Answering an enquiry from a French correspondent in 1904, the Chancery set out the two rules that governed the order: no fee was charged for the diploma or the insignia, whether the recipient was a Montenegrin or a foreigner, and the Chancery could deprive of the decoration any person convicted by the courts of the Principality of a grave and dishonourable act, though such cases were very rare and no withdrawal had ever been published. The Prince alone could authorise the wearing of another person's insignia: a circular of the Minister of War, Duke Ilija Plamenac, in July 1891 forbade the practice, observed particularly in the border districts, of young men wearing the orders or sabres of their fathers, uncles or other kinsmen "on the pretext of some imagined right" of inheritance, and required officers to fine any soldier found doing so.

=== As a dynastic order ===
Admission to the order lies solely with the Grand Master and is not subject to nomination by any government; persons of merit, including foreign sovereigns, princes and individuals of distinction, may be admitted. Conferral consists of the grant of the dignity, the investiture with the insignia and the issue of Letters Patent, and may be made by proxy where the recipient cannot be present, or posthumously, the insignia being presented to the family. Each appointment is entered in the Register kept by the Grand Chancellery, and members are bound to furnish the Chancellery with accurate particulars. The Grand Master may suspend or deprive any member, without giving reasons and without appeal; on deprivation all rights and dignities cease and the name is struck from the Register. Insignia may be worn only in the class lawfully conferred; their manufacture, sale or commercial use without the Grand Master's authority is prohibited, and possession of insignia not personally conferred, or acquired commercially, confers none of the rights of membership. Members may display the insignia with their armorial bearings in accordance with heraldic law and usage.

== Associated decorations ==
Under the Principality and Kingdom the order was accompanied by the Medal for Zeal (Medalja za revnost), instituted by Nikola I in 1895 in gold and silver as Montenegro's first peacetime decoration for civil merit. The medal was conferred on Montenegrins and foreigners without distinction of rank, profession or sex, and was, with the Order of Danilo, the decoration most frequently bestowed by the Montenegrin ruler, for purposes ranging from the cultural and educational to the military and humanitarian. The two were ordered from the makers together: the Silberberg commission of April 1910 covered 300 Medals for Zeal alongside 373 insignia of the order, and the Hamburg records of 1911 to 1914 name the Order of Danilo and the Medal for Zeal as the decorations most often in need of replenishment. The medal's ribbon was fixed with that of the order in the Gaeta instruction of September 1920. The medal remains in the gift of the head of the Royal House.

== Precedence ==
Within the order the Collar takes precedence over all other distinctions; the manner of wearing the insignia and all other questions of precedence are determined by the Grand Master. Within the dynastic orders of the House of Petrović-Njegoš the Order of Prince Danilo I ranks after the Order of Saint Peter of Cetinje, the house order reserved to members of the dynasty and its kin, and before the Order of Petrović Njegoš.

== Notable recipients ==
Kapičić's register of Montenegrin decorations and their recipients between 1841 and 1921, published by Matica crnogorska in three volumes in 2026, lists more than 11,000 names compiled from archival, library and museum sources; the compiler notes that it is nonetheless incomplete, much of the archival record being damaged or illegible. The register records the order under its founding name, as the "Order for the Independence of Montenegro (Order of Danilo)", with the class held.

Besides the sovereigns and statesmen mentioned above, the order was conferred during the First World War on a number of senior Allied commanders, whose appointments were published in the London Gazette between 1916 and 1918. They included Prince Arthur, Duke of Connaught and Strathearn, Field Marshal Sir Douglas Haig, Lieutenant-General Sir Henry Rawlinson, Lieutenant-General Sir Launcelot Kiggell, Lieutenant-General Sir James Gordon Legge and Major-General Sir Andrew Hamilton Russell, and General John J. Pershing, commander of the American Expeditionary Forces, who received the Grand Cordon of the order together with the Obilić Medal on 25 September 1918.

More recent members of the order include Albert II, Prince of Monaco on 7 December 2005, and Duarte Pio, Duke of Braganza and Isabel, Duchess of Braganza in the same period. On 31 January 2006 Fra' Andrew Bertie, Prince and Grand Master of the Sovereign Military Order of Malta, received the order in Rome in an exchange of decorations between the two orders, in which Fra' John Dunlap, then a member of the Order of Malta's governing Sovereign Council and now its Prince and Grand Master, was also invested. Kinsmen of the Royal House who hold the order include Emanuele Filiberto of Savoy, Prince of Venice and the late Prince Dimitri Romanov, author of the standard English-language history of the Montenegrin orders. Since the restoration of Montenegrin independence in 2006 it has also been conferred on Montenegrin office-holders, including President Filip Vujanović, invested on 4 June 2005, and the ambassador to the United Nations Nebojša Kaluđerović.

== See also ==
- Orders, decorations, and medals of Montenegro
- Order of Petrović Njegoš
- Order of Saint Peter of Cetinje
- Obilić Medal
- Medal for Zeal (Montenegro)
- Law on the Status of the Descendants of the Petrović Njegoš Dynasty

== Bibliography ==
- Aćović, Dragomir (2012). Slava i čast: Odlikovanja među Srbima, Srbi među odlikovanjima (in Serbian). Belgrade: Službeni glasnik.
- Jovićević, Milan (1982). Crnogorska odlikovanja [Montenegrin Decorations] (in Serbo-Croatian). Cetinje.
- Měřička, Václav (November 1969). "The Danilo Order – The Order of the Independence of Montenegro". The Medal Collector. 20 (11). Orders and Medals Society of America: 3–19.
- Kapičić, Anđe (2026). Nosioci crnogorskih odlikovanja (1841–1921) [Recipients of Montenegrin Decorations (1841–1921)] (in Montenegrin). Vol. I. Cetinje: Matica crnogorska. ISBN 978-9940-39-106-5.
- Romanov, Dimitri (1980). The Orders, Medals and History of Montenegro. Copenhagen: Bent Carlsens Forlag. ISBN 87-85216-27-5.
- "Statut Ordena Knjaza Danila I Crnogorskog". Službeni list Crne Gore (in Montenegrin). 7 August 2026. Registry no. 2142.
