= Orders, decorations, and medals of Montenegro =

Orders, decorations, and medals of Montenegro is a system of awards in Montenegro. The Government of Montenegro established a national honours system consisting of orders, decorations, and medals approximately a year after the independence of Montenegro in 2006.

The President of Montenegro is the titular head of the national honours system and decrees and invests each honoree on the advice and approval of the Government of Montenegro.

== National honours ==
Each order consists of several grades and each honour may be bestowed on nationals and foreigners alike.

Award	Order	Class	Native name
	Order of the Republic of Montenegro	Necklace	Orden Republike Crne Gore na velikoj ogrlici
	Order of the Republic of Montenegro	Sash	Orden Republike Crne Gore na lenti
	Order of the Montenegrin Grand Star		Orden Crnogorske velike zvijezde
	Order of Montenegrin independence		Orden Crnogorske nezavisnosti
	Order of the Montenegrin Flag	1st degree	Orden Crnogorske zastave I stepena
	Order of the Montenegrin Flag	2nd degree	Orden Crnogorske zastave II stepena
	Order of the Montenegrin Flag	3rd degree	Orden Crnogorske zastave III stepena
	Order for Bravery		Orden za hrabrost
	Order of Work		Orden rada
	Medal for Bravery		Medalja za hrabrost
	Medal for Humanitarianism		Medalja za čovjekoljublja
	Medal for Service		Medalja za zasluge

== Presidential honours ==
Included within the National Honours Act, is the power of the President to award the Presidential Award of Recognition to prominent Montenegrin and foreign nationals who have served the President in a high capacity. This award is also granted to foreign statesmen and some resident foreign ambassadors of EU and NATO countries at the conclusion of their mission. It consists of a Presidential diploma.

== Dynastic awards ==
The Kingdom of Montenegro issued its own royal awards up until the monarchy's abolition in 1918. Today, the head of Montenegrin Royal House the House of Petrović-Njegoš, Prince Nicholas of Montenegro, has continued to award dynastic honours. The Law on the Status of the Descendants of the Petrović Njegoš Dynasty (2011), as amended in 2026, provides the legal framework for this activity. The statutes of the orders are published in the Official Gazette of Montenegro; the Statute of the Order of Prince Danilo I of Montenegro, issued under the amended law, was published on 7 August 2026 and entered into force on 15 August 2026. Orders and decorations bestowed by the Royal House include:

- Order of Saint Peter of Cetinje
- Order of Prince Danilo I
- Order of Petrović-Njegoš
- Order of the Red Cross
- Order of the Freedom of Montenegro (founded in exile in 1919)
- Medal for Zeal
