= Order of Saint Peter of Cetinje =

Order of Saint Peter of Cetinje Орден Светога Петра Цетињскога
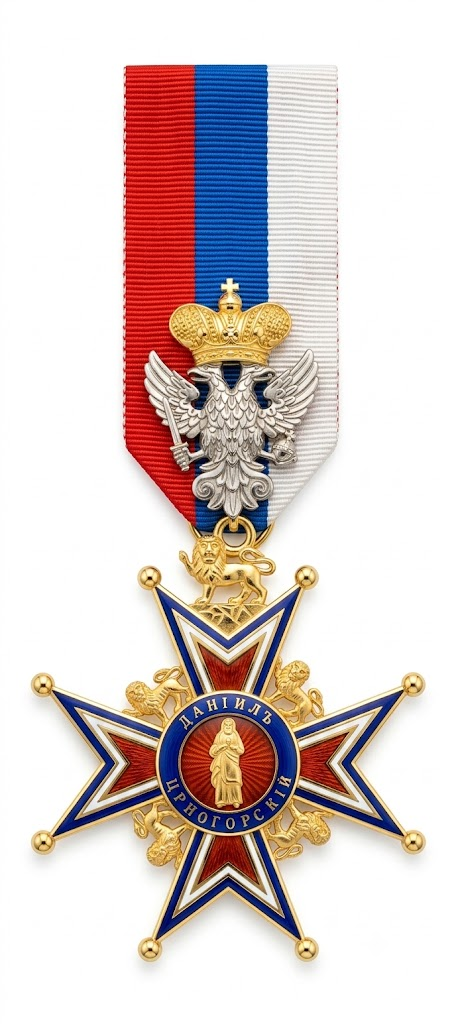
- Badge of a Knight of the order

Awarded by the Royal House of Montenegro
- Type: Dynastic order of knighthood
- Established: c. 1869
- Royal house: House of Petrović-Njegoš
- Eligibility: Members of the Petrović-Njegoš dynasty, their kinsmen, and prominent foreign citizens
- Awarded for: At the Sovereign's pleasure
- Status: Currently constituted
- Founder: Nikola I
- Sovereign: Nikola II
- Grand Master: Hereditary Prince Boris, Grand Duke of Grahovo and Zeta
- Grades: Knight/Dame
- Post-nominals: OStP

Precedence
- Next (lower): Order of Prince Danilo I
- Ribbon bar

The Order of Saint Peter of Cetinje (Montenegrin: Orden Svetoga Petra Cetinjskoga; Cyrillic: Орден Светога Петра Цетињскога), also recorded as the Princely Montenegrin House Order, is a dynastic house order of the Royal House of Montenegro. It is the most exclusive of the dynastic Orders of the Royal House and, historically, one of the rarest orders of Europe, being reserved in the main for members of the reigning family and their kinsmen, and only in exceptional circumstances conferred upon foreign sovereigns and recipients.

The order takes its name from Saint Petar I Petrović-Njegoš (1748–1830), Prince-Bishop (vladika) and ruler of Montenegro, who was canonised by the Serbian Orthodox Church as Saint Peter of Cetinje (Sveti Petar Cetinjski). It is distinct from, and senior to, the other dynastic decorations of the Royal House. Following the fall of the monarchy in 1918, the Order is today conferred as a private house order under the fons honorum held by the Head of the Royal House of Montenegro. In 2011 the Parliament of Montenegro adopted the Law on the Status of the Descendants of the Petrović Njegoš Dynasty, recognising a non-political role for the Royal House in the cultural life of the country.

== History ==
=== Foundation ===
The order was instituted by Prince (later King) Nikola I. Sources differ slightly on the exact date: the standard reference work by Prince Dimitri Romanoff states that, "according to the latest researches", Nikola I created the order around 1870 in tribute to his predecessor, Prince Danilo I, while other catalogues give the year of institution as 1869. A tradition also holds that an order of Saint Peter had been established somewhat earlier by the poet–Prince-Bishop Petar II Petrović-Njegoš (Vladika Rade), who reigned from 1830 to 1851.

=== Name and dedication ===
The order commemorates Saint Petar I Petrović-Njegoš, who ruled Montenegro for some forty-eight years and who, in that period, both defended the country and consolidated the unity and independence of the nation. Canonised four years after his death, he is venerated as the patron saint of the Montenegrin church, and his incorrupt relics are preserved at the Cetinje Monastery.

A distinctive feature of the order is that the name of Prince Danilo, the first Montenegrin ruler to bear a purely secular title, is inscribed upon the decoration. This is generally attributed to the fact that the badge of Saint Peter served as a prototype for the later and more widely conferred Order of Prince Danilo I.

=== Dynastic continuation ===
The Montenegrin monarchy came to an end in 1918, when the country was incorporated into the Kingdom of Serbs, Croats and Slovenes. The head of the House of Petrović-Njegoš has since continued to confer the dynastic honours. In Montenegro, the right of the head of the House to award such honours was acknowledged by the state through the 2011 Law on the Status of the Descendants of the Petrović Njegoš Dynasty.

Following a period of abeyance, in 2005 the dynastic orders were once more conferred in ceremonial form, the first modern gala investiture being held at Cetinje in June 2005.

== Insignia ==
According to Romanoff, the badge is executed in gold and enamel and measures approximately 42 mm in diameter; it was historically suspended from a triangular (Montenegrin-style) ribbon, now a traditional vertical ribbon, and is described as "extremely rare". The badge takes the form of an enamelled cross with lions between its arms, ensigned by a two-headed silver eagle that is attached directly to the ribbon and links by a golden ring to the crown-and-eagle suspension above the cross. The central medallion carries the inscription naming Prince Danilo of Montenegro.

== Composition ==
The order consists of a single class, styled Knight (Dame for women). It is normally reserved for members of the Royal Family of Montenegro and their kinsmen, and only in exceptional circumstances is it conferred upon prominent foreign personages. When the Prince and Grand Master of the Sovereign Military Order of Malta, Fra' Andrew Bertie, received the Order in 2006, the House itself described the grant as, for a foreign citizen, "an extremely rare honour" precisely because the Order is otherwise confined to the dynasty and its kin.

== Recipients ==
=== Historical recipients ===
Romanoff records that the order was bestowed upon several members of the Petrović-Njegoš ruling family and some of their descendants, and, among others, upon:

- Ilija Plamenac, Montenegrin Duke (vojvoda) and commander in the war of 1875-1878
- Alexander II, Emperor of Russia
- Peter I, King of Serbia (son-in-law of Nikola I)
- Alexander I, King of Yugoslavia
- Victor Emmanuel III, King of Italy (son-in-law of Nikola I through Queen Elena)

=== Modern recipients ===
Since the revival of ceremonial investitures in the 2000s, the order has continued to be conferred, chiefly within the dynasty:

- Fra' Andrew Bertie, Prince and Grand Master of the Sovereign Military Order of Malta (2006), a rare foreign recipient
- Borwin, Duke of Mecklenburg, and Alice, Duchess of Mecklenburg

== See also ==
- Orders, decorations, and medals of Montenegro
- Order of Prince Danilo I
- Order of Petrović-Njegoš
- Order of the Red Cross (Montenegro)
- Petrović-Njegoš dynasty
