= Nikola Petrović =

Nikola Petrović (Cyrillic: Никола Петровић) may refer to:

- Nikola I Petrović-Njegoš (1841–1921), ruler of Montenegro from 1860 to 1918
- Nikola II Petrović-Njegoš (born 1944), Head of the House of Petrović-Njegoš
- Nikola Petrović (footballer) (born 1988), Serbian football goalkeeper
