= Mirac =

Mirac Мирац
- Village
- Location of Mirac in Montenegro
- Coordinates: 42°23′N 18°46′E
- Country: Montenegro
- Region: Coastal
- Municipality: Kotor

Population (2011)
  - Total: 79
- Time zone: UTC+1 (CET)
  - Summer (DST): UTC+2 (CEST)
- Area code: +382 32

Mirac (Montenegrin: Мирац) is a settlement in Montenegro, three miles from Kotor. It was historically part of the Njeguši tribe. During the Ottoman period it was, together with Njeguši and Zalazi, commanded by Niko Rajkov of the Njeguši clan who had 480 men in arms. It was considered the borderland of Old Montenegro. The town was in dispute with neighbouring town Spiljari over property and land. The settlement is known for the meeting between Petar I Petrović-Njegoš and the French Marshall Auguste de Marmont, who discussed the preceding skirmishes between the Montenegrin and French armies. The meeting was held at the Church of Saint George.
