= Medal for Zeal (Montenegro) =

Decoration of Montenegro, originally a civilian award of the Principality

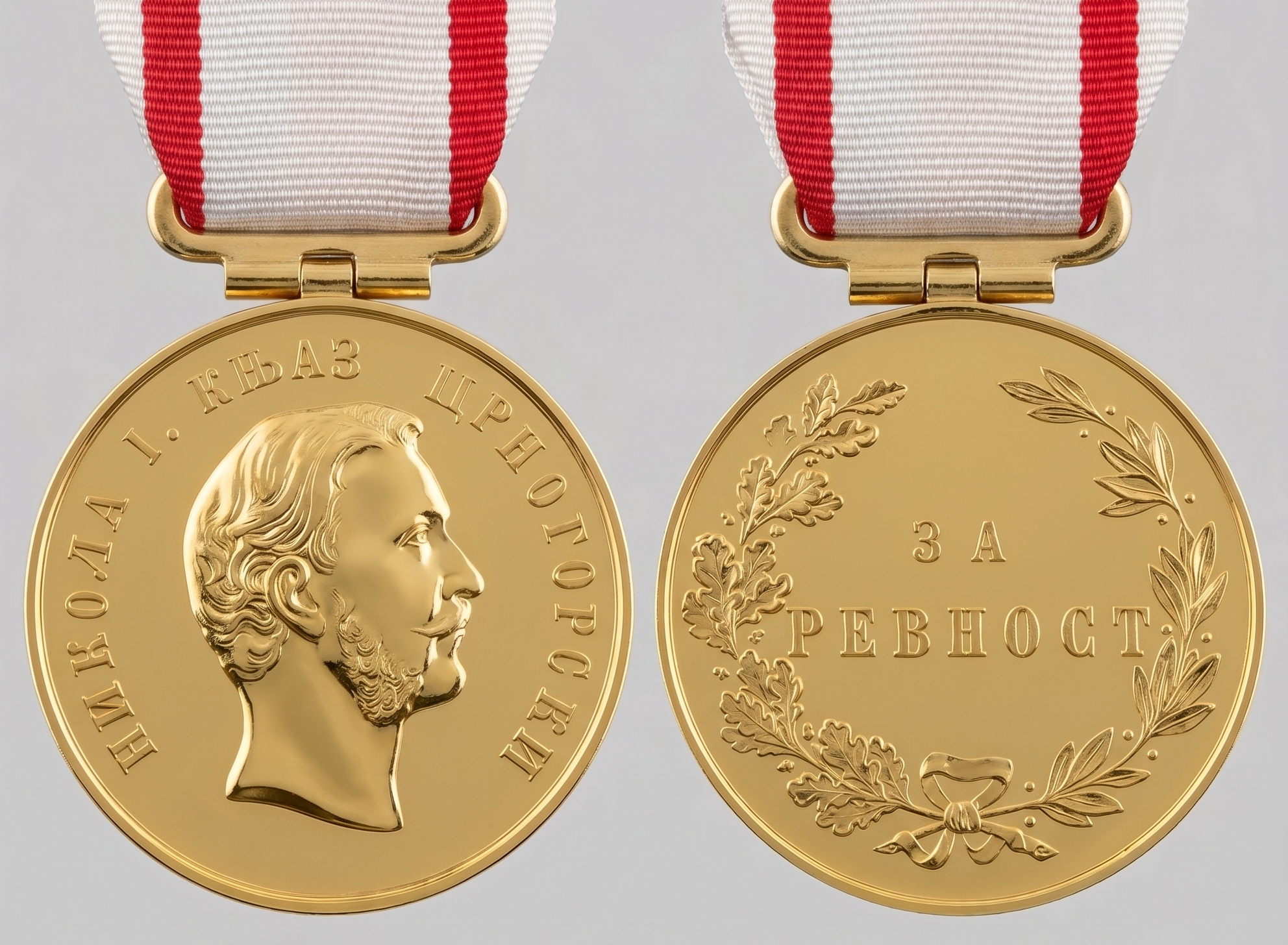
- The obverse and reverse of the Medal for Zeal
- Native name: Medalja za revnost
- Type: Civil decoration (medal)
- Awarded for: Long and loyal service to the Sovereign or royal family, and the efficient discharge of duty in the service of the state
- Presented by: Prince Nikola I of the Principality of Montenegro
- Eligibility: Royal Household personnel and servants of the state; Montenegrin and foreign nationals
- Motto: Za revnost ("For Zeal")
- Status: Instituted 1895; currently awarded by the Royal House of Petrović-Njegoš
- Established: 1895
- Ribbon of the medal

The Medal for Zeal (Montenegrin: Medalja za revnost; Cyrillic: Медаља за ревност) is a decoration established by Prince Nikola I Petrović-Njegoš in 1895. It is generally regarded as the first Montenegrin decoration established specifically to recognise civilian merit, and is awarded for personal service to the Sovereign or the royal family by members of the Royal Household and to servants of the state for long and faithful service. It is a personal gift of the Head of the Royal House of Montenegro.

In creating the medal, Nikola I followed the precedent of other European monarchs, who maintained household medals with which to reward domestic and administrative servants.

== History ==
The Medal for Zeal was instituted in 1895 during the reign of Prince Nikola I. It was awarded to members of the Royal Household for long and loyal service, and to individuals who had efficiently discharged their duties in the service of the Montenegrin state. Unlike earlier Montenegrin decorations, which primarily recognised military merit, it was intended principally as a civilian award, and is described as the first specifically civilian decoration issued in the Principality. (Note: A claim that the award originated as early as 1859 appears in some faleristic sources, but is unsupported by documentary evidence and is not generally accepted.)

A second type, with a roller-shaped suspension, was produced from around 1908. Following the abolition of the monarchy in 1918, the Royal House of Montenegro continues to award honours and decorations. Its status was recognised by Montenegro under the 2011 Law on the Status of the Descendants of the Petrović Njegoš Dynasty, which provides that the traditions of the dynasty are continued by the descendants of King Nikola I.

== Classes ==
The decoration was instituted in two classes:

- First Class – gold or silver-gilt
- Second Class – silver

== Description ==
The medal is circular and measures approximately 30 mm in diameter. First Class examples weigh approximately 18 g, while Second Class pieces, struck in silver or gilt, weigh between 11 and 12 g. The design closely follows that of the Medal for Courage, founded in 1862 by Prince Nikola I and awarded for distinguished service during the campaign of 1861–62. Romanov notes that, apart from the reverse inscription, the two are virtually identical, and suggests that the original die was modified and reused more than three decades later, probably for reasons of economy.

The obverse bears the youthful effigy of Prince Nikola I, surrounded by the inscription NIKOLA I KNJAZ CRNE GORE ("Nikola I, Prince of Montenegro"). The reverse is enclosed within a wreath formed by an oak branch and a laurel branch, with the inscription ZA REVNOST ("For Zeal") at its centre.

Several patterns of suspension are recorded. Earlier pieces use a threaded-through suspension with a laterally pierced cylindrical eyelet; later patterns employ a spherical (ball) eyelet or, from around 1908, a roller-shaped suspension. The medal was worn from a triangular folded ribbon. Surviving examples carry the marks of several die-sinkers and manufacturers who supplied Montenegrin decorations, including Christelbauer and V. Mayer's Söhne of Vienna and Arthus-Bertrand of Paris. Cased examples survive in red leatherette cases bearing the Montenegrin coat of arms, the interiors marked Chancellerie de l'Ordre Danilo.

== Rarity ==
Surviving examples are described by Romanov as follows:

- First Class: very rare
- Second Class: scarce

== Significance ==
The institution of the Medal for Zeal marked the introduction of Montenegro's first decoration intended specifically for civilian service. It reflected the developing civil administration of the Principality during the reign of Nikola I, and recognised loyal and efficient service by officials of the Royal Household and the state.

== See also ==
- Orders, decorations, and medals of Montenegro
- Nicholas I of Montenegro
- Principality of Montenegro

== Bibliography ==
- Romanov, Dimitri (1980). The Orders, Medals and History of Montenegro. Copenhagen: Bent Carlsens Forlag. ISBN 87-85216-27-5.
- Měřička, Václav (April 1973). "The Decorations of Montenegro". The Medal Collector. 24 (4). Orders and Medals Society of America: 3–27.
