= "Josip Broz Tito" Art Gallery of the Nonaligned Countries =

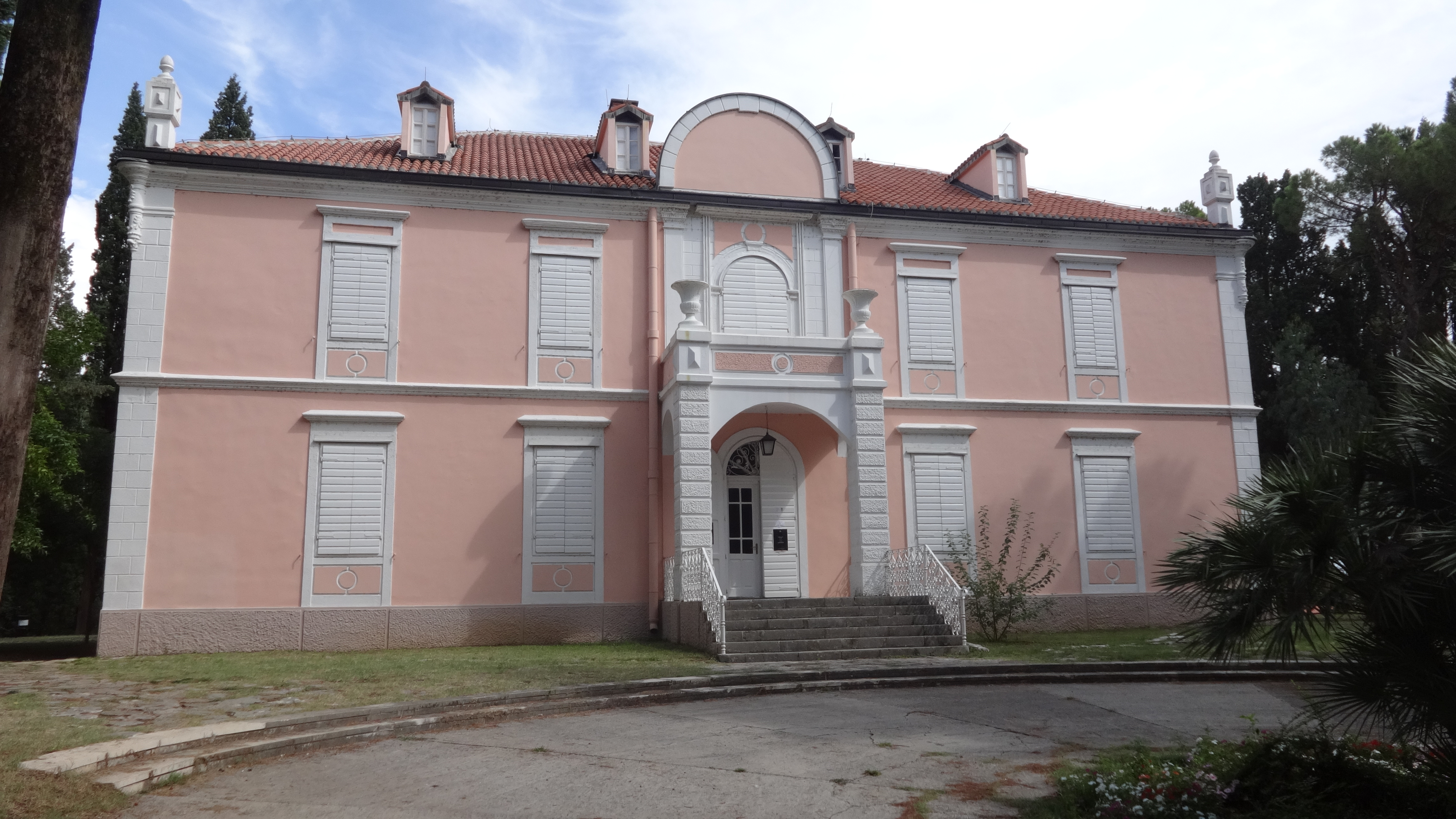
- Podgorica Royal Palace hosted the gallery
- Established: 1 September 1984
- Dissolved: 4 April 1995
- Location: Titograd, SR Montenegro, SFR Yugoslavia (1984–1992); Podgorica, Montenegro, FR Yugoslavia (1992–1995)
- Coordinates: 42°26′16″N 19°15′01″E

The "Josip Broz Tito" Art Gallery of the Nonaligned Countries (Serbo-Croatian: Galerija umjetnosti nesvrstanih zemalja „Josip Broz Tito” / Галерија умјетности несврстаних земаља „Јосип Броз Тито”) was an art gallery in Titograd (modern day Podgorica) in the Socialist Republic of Montenegro, one of the federal subjects of the Socialist Federal Republic Yugoslavia. It was the only art institution established directly by the Non-Aligned Movement's decision.

The Gallery was established on 1 September 1984 with the aim of collection, preservation and presentation of the arts and cultures of the non-aligned and developing countries. The document on the establishment of the gallery was introduced at the 8th Summit of the Non-Aligned Movement in Harare, Zimbabwe where it was envisaged as a common institution of non-aligned countries tasked with the organization of the Triennial of art from the NAM countries which in the end never took place due to the Yugoslav Wars.

Over the years of its existence it acquired a collection of some 800 artworks from 56 non-aligned and developing countries. It contains "works of fine and applied art; furniture, musical instruments and other items of special importance; ethnological, anthropological, archaeological, geological and subjects related to significant events and historical figures; and antiques". The gallery was formally closed on 4 April 1995 when the Parliament of Montenegro established the Centre for Contemporary Art of Montenegro which in full inherited the fundus of the "Josip Broz Tito" Art Gallery.

== History ==
Final document of the 7th Summit of the Non-Aligned Movement in New Delhi, India and the First Conference of Ministers of Culture of the Non-Aligned Movement, Pyongyang, North Korea, both in 1983, invited the member states to cooperate with the new gallery. Subsequent meeting of ministers of culture in Havana, Cuba proposed recognizing the gallery as a common institution. The "Josip Broz Tito" Art Gallery was established on 1 September 1984.

The City of Titograd provided the representative Podgorica Royal Palace alongside the Morača river to host the gallery. In 1986 the gallery was recognized as a common institution of the NAM member states at the 8th Summit of the Non-Aligned Movement in Harare, Zimbabwe where the gallery organized exhibition as a part of the summit. This exhibition was subsequently presented in Lusaka, Dar es Salaam, Delhi and Cairo. That same year UNESCO supported organization of The First Symposium on Art and Development at the gallery.

The gallery served as a common space to share at one place marginalized cultural production from the Third World countries and to counter hegemonic Eurocentrism in art and culture. Contrary to numerous museums and galleries in former colonial metropoles, the entire fundus of the gallery was formed from gifts and donations from the Non-Aligned member states. Bernard Matemera created his white marble sculpture called "Family" during his stay at the gallery in 1987. 1988 Non-Aligned Broadcasting Conference in Limassol, Cyprus decided to organize annual documentary TV competition at the gallery with 19 countries participating in 1988 and 20 countries in 1989. International status of the institution was officially recognized at the 9th Summit of the Non-Aligned Movement in Belgrade, SR Serbia in 1989. National selections of donations for the gallery were made either by foreign ministries or with the support of professional institutions with the notable case being Indian selection done with the support of the National Gallery of Modern Art from New Delhi. The Gallery presented a mummy called Nesmin from its Egyptian collection in the gallery from 1986 until 1991 when it was returned to the National Museum of Serbia in Belgrade on request of the Department of Archaeology at the Faculty of Philosophy, University of Belgrade.

In 1995 the Parliament of Montenegro established the new Centre for Contemporary Art of Montenegro by merging the gallery with the Montenegrin Republic's Cultural Centre. The work of the gallery attracted renewed attention with the organization of the 2019 Southern Constellations exhibition in Ljubljana, Slovenia, 2020 Solidarity Spores exhibition in Gwangju, South Korea, 2021 Southern Constellations exhibition in Rijeka, Croatia and 2022 Podgorica Botanical Garden exhibition by the Centre for Contemporary Art of Montenegro.

In September 2024, the Administration for the Protection of Cultural Property of Montenegro granted the gallery and collection the "status of movable cultural property of national importance". This decision came as a result of a successful initiative by the curators of the then Contemporary Art Center (Marina Šaranović, Anita Ćulafić, Nađa Baković and Natalija Vujošević) who made the request in 2022.

== See also ==
- Yugoslavia and the Non-Aligned Movement
- Museum of African Art, Belgrade
