= Nicholas, Prince of Montenegro (born 1944) =

Nicholas: Никола
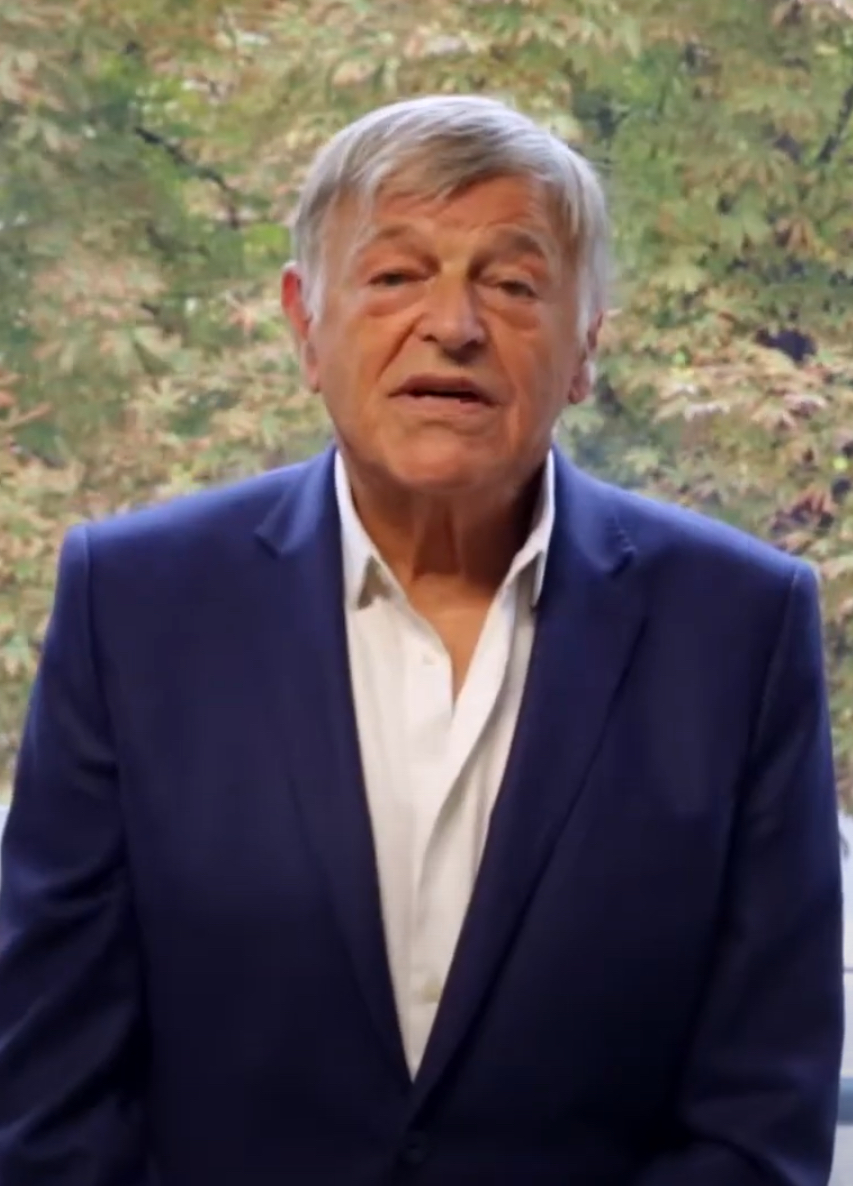
- Prince Nikola in 2017

Head of the House of Petrović-Njegoš
- Period: 24 March 1986 – present
- Predecessor: Michael, Prince of Montenegro
- Heir apparent: Boris, Hereditary Prince of Montenegro
- Born: 7 July 1944 (age 82); Saint-Nicolas-du-Pélem, France
- Spouse: Francine Navarro (m. 1976; died 2008)
- Issue: Princess Altinaï; Boris, Hereditary Prince of Montenegro
Names
- Nikola Mihajlo Frane Petrović-Njegoš
- House: Petrović-Njegoš
- Father: Michael, Prince of Montenegro
- Mother: Geneviève Prigent

Nicholas, Prince of Montenegro (Montenegrin: Nikola Petrović Njegoš/ Никола Петровић Његош; born 7 July 1944), is a French-born architect and the Head of the House of Petrović-Njegoš, which reigned over Montenegro from 1696 to 1766 and again from 1782 to 1918.

He lives in Montenegro and occupies part of the former royal palace and the historic family home in Njeguši. In 2011, the country recognised an official role for the Royal House of Petrović-Njegoš: to promote Montenegrin identity, culture, and traditions through cultural, humanitarian and other non-political activities.

== Family background ==
The House of Petrović came originally from Herzegovina and settled in Njeguši around 1400. Niegosch was born around 1425 and became the Voivode of Njegoš.

Nicholas descends from Danilo Petrović-Njegoš who obtained the hereditary Dignity of Vladika (Prince-Bishop) of Montenegro in 1711 when it became a theocracy. Danilo I Petrović-Njegoš was recognized as Sovereign Prince of Montenegro by Russia on 21 March 1852, and established succession by male primogeniture. His successor, Prince Nikola I assumed the style of Royal Highness on 19 December 1900, and then the title of King on 28 August 1910.

Nicholas is also related to the former royal House of Obrenović through Jevrem, younger brother of Miloš Obrenović I, Prince of Serbia.

During World War I, the Petrović Njegoš family were forced to flee the country in 1915 after the Army of Montenegro was overwhelmed by the troops of the Austro-Hungarian Empire. At the end of the war, Montenegro joined the Kingdom of Serbia, while the Podgorica People's Assembly abolished the Kingdom of Montenegro and deposed the Petrović Njegoš dynasty.

The family gained French citizenship and made their home in France, where Nikola I of Montenegro died in exile in 1921. The same year, King Nikola's maternal grandson, Alexandar Karađorđević (Prince Nikola I's cousin) became king of the Kingdom of Serbs, Croats and Slovenes, of which Montenegro had become a part. Though the Kingdom of the Serbs, Croats and Slovenes was proclaimed on 13 November 1918, it was never recognized by Nikola I, who maintained a government-in-exile, which was headed by the ex-king's former aide-de-camp and ambassador to Washington, General Anto Gvozdenović, until the Conference of Ambassadors at Paris gave international recognition to the union 13 July 1922.

Nicholas I's heir was his eldest son, Crown Prince Danilo (titular King Danilo II), who abdicated after one week, recognizing his cousin's reign over Serbia (including the territories of Montenegro) and Yugoslavia. The family's dynastic claim was taken up by Nicholas I's grandson, Michael, Prince of Montenegro, the titular King Mihajlo I, who was the father of Prince Nikola II. He died in exile in 1986.

== Early life ==
Nicholas was born in Saint-Nicolas-du-Pélem at the house of a maternal great aunt in France as the only son and heir of Michael, Prince of Montenegro and his wife Geneviève [Genovefa], Princess of Montenegro, née Prigent (1919–1990), a member of the French resistance. Prince Michael was internationally recognised as Montenegro's king-in-exile under a regency headed by his grandmother Queen Milena from 7 March 1921 until 13 July 1922 when international recognition was given for the 1918 annexation of Montenegro by the new Serbian headed kingdom of Serbs, Croats and Slovenes. Prince Nicholas' parents were married on 27 January 1941 in Paris.

Nicholas was initially baptised Catholic by his mother before his father had him re-baptised Orthodox. Nicholas has stated he feels close to both religions. His parents divorced in Paris, France, on 11 August 1949, exactly 5 weeks after his 5th birthday. Geneviève received custody of the young Nicholas and raised him largely as a single mother. Growing up in France Nicholas barely saw his father; consequentially, he knew very little about Montenegro or his family's history as he was raised and educated as a Frenchman.

In 1967 while a student he visited Montenegro for the first time, upon showing his university ID card the staff bowed upon recognising the Petrović-Njegoš name. News of his visit had spread and by the time he left the museum a crowd of 300 Montenegrins had gathered to greet him.

== Head of the royal house ==
Nicholas succeeded as head of the House of Petrović-Njegoš on the death of his father in 1986 and grew closer to his Montenegrin heritage. In 1989 he received an official invitation to come to Montenegro for the reburial and state funeral of his great grandparents King Nicholas I of Montenegro and Queen Milena and their two daughters, Princess Vera and Princess Xenia. Nicholas accompanied the remains on an Italian battleship and his family received an enthusiastic welcome from Montenegrins.

During the breakup of Yugoslavia, Nicholas made several statements calling on Montenegrins not to get caught up in the violence.

Nicholas chose not to attend the celebrations of the centenary of the Kingdom of Montenegro that were held on 28 August 2010. Instead, he celebrated in private.

Nicholas was an active participant in the campaign for the restoration of Montenegro's independence, preceding the referendum on the separation of the former kingdom from the provisional State Union of Serbia and Montenegro.

Legislation passed in 2011 provides Nicholas with a monthly stipend equal to that of the President, and grants his family residences in Cetinje and Podgorica, the Petrović Njegoš historic family home in Njeguši, and use of the first floor of the former royal palace. The Montenegrin state also promised to pay €4.3 million to a charitable foundation administered by the family.

== Marriage and children ==
On 27 November 1976 in Trébeurden, Côtes-du-Nord, Brittany, France, he married Francine [aka France] Navarro (Casablanca, 27 January 1950 – Paris, 6 August 2008), a fashion designer. She was the daughter of Antoine Navarro (Melilla, 29 January 1922 – Marseille, 12 August 1989), who fought in the French Foreign Legion, and his wife Rachel Wazana (Casablanca, 19 July 1929), of Moroccan Jewish descent, and paternal granddaughter of Francisco Navarro and his wife Carmela Padia and maternal granddaughter of Charles Wazana and his wife Fanny. Together they had two children, Altinaï and Boris, and lived at Les Lilas, near Paris, France:

- Princess Altinaï of Montenegro, born at Les Lilas, Seine-Saint-Denis, on 27 October 1977. She is a filmmaker and married Russian violinist Anton Martynov on 12 May 2009. The couple has one son:
  - Nikolai Martynov (born 30 September 2009)
- Boris, Hereditary Prince of Montenegro, Grand-Duke (Voivode) of Grahovo and Zeta, born at Les Lilas on 21 January 1980. He is a creative director at Renault France and married architect Véronique Haillot Canas da Silva (b. São Sebastião da Pedreira, Lisbon, 27 July 1976; daughter of António Canas da Silva and Anne Haillot) on 12 May 2007. They have two daughters:
  - Milena (b. Maternité des Lilas, Seine-Saint-Denis, France, 11 February 2008)
  - Antonia (b. 2013)

== Honours, awards and arms ==
=== Honours ===
==== National dynastic honours ====
- (Kingdom of Montenegro) House of Petrović-Njegoš: Grand Master of the Order of Petrović Njegoš
- (Kingdom of Montenegro) House of Petrović-Njegoš: Grand Master of the Order of Prince Danilo I
- (Kingdom of Montenegro) House of Petrović-Njegoš: Grand Master of the Order of Saint Peter of Cetinje

==== Foreign honours ====
- France: Member of the Order of the Legion of Honour
- (Italy) Italian Republic: Red Cross Great Cross
- (Italy) Italian Republic: Recipient of the Red Cross Gold Medal
- (Kingdom of Italy) Italian Royal Family: Knight Supreme Order of the Most Holy Annunciation
- (Kingdom of Italy) Italian Royal Family: Knight Grand Cross of the Royal Order of Saints Maurice and Lazarus
- (Kingdom of Italy) Italian Royal Family: Knight Grand Cross of the Order of Merit of Savoy
- (Kingdom of the Two Sicilies) Two Sicilian Royal Family: Recipient of the Golden Medal of Honor of the Sacred Military Constantinian Order of Saint George
- (Kingdom of the Two Sicilies) Two Sicilian Royal Family: Knight Grand Cross of the Royal Order of Francis I
- Sovereign Military Order of Malta: Bailiff Grand Cross of Honour and Devotion of the Sovereign Military Order of Malta, 2nd Class with Band
- (Grand Duchy of Mecklenburg-Strelitz) Grand Ducal Royal Family of Mecklenburg: Knight Grand Cross of the Order of the Wendish Crown
- (Kingdom of Portugal) Portuguese Royal Family: Knight Grand Cross of the Order of the Immaculate Conception of Vila Viçosa
- (Kingdom of Georgia) Georgian Royal Family: Knight Grand Cross with Collar of the Order of the Eagle of Georgia

=== Awards ===
- Honorary citizen of Agrigento, Sicily, Italy (23 June 2007)

=== Coat of arms ===
Royal Standard of Nicholas, Prince of Montenegro

He bears the Montenegrin Coat of Arms, which can be seen at the centre of the Flag of Montenegro. The Royal Coat of Arms is borne by the head of the Petrović Njegoš Dynasty, and differs from the family Coat of Arms.

The Constitution of 2007 maintained "the tradition" of King Nicholas I: the adopted Coat of Arms was a crowned silver eagle with the sara in one and the sceptre in the other claw, and charged on its breast was a red shield with the lion passant.

The 2011 Law on the Status of the Descendants of the Petrović Njegoš Dynasty states that Nicholas "may use the heraldic symbols of the Petrović Njegoš dynasty" (Article 6).

== See also ==
- Heads of former ruling families

Nicholas, Prince of Montenegro (born 1944) House of Petrović-Njegoš Born: 7 July 1944
Titles in pretence
| Preceded by Michael | — TITULAR — King of Montenegro; 24 March 1986 – present | Incumbent |
