= Đurađ Bogutović =

- Noble family: House of Petrović-Njegoš
- Occupation: Serbian medieval nobility; Served Vuk Branković

Đurađ Bogutović (Serbian Cyrillic: Ђурађ Богутовић; fl. 1370–1399) was a Serbian medieval nobleman. He is an ancestor of the House of Petrović-Njegoš and the Njeguši tribe.

== Life ==
Đurađ's father, "Bogut" or "Boguta", is believed to be the oldest known ancestor of the House of Petrovic-Njegoš - the Metropolitans and once ruling family of Montenegro. Bogut was an alive at the time of the Battle of Velbazhd (1330) and the building of Visoki Dečani, and perhaps into the 1340s. According to tradition, and recorded by some historians, the ancestors of the Petrović family settled in Muževice at the end of the 14th century, from the Bosnia region, from the area of Zenica or Travnik. It is possible that Bogut at that time had moved to Drobnjaci with his son.

Đurađ or some of his sons were in the entourage of Marko Drago, an affluent Serbian nobleman who had served Serbian lord Vuk Branković (1345-1397), and as such they are believed to have also served Vuk. Đurađ and his five sons "from Drobnjaci" are mentioned in a document dating March 1, 1399, in which they gave several items to the depository of Dapko Vasilijev, an affluent Kotoran nobleman.

== Family ==
Đurađ Bogutović had five sons (with their descendants):

- Vukac (fl. 1399)
- Radin (fl. 1399)
- Herak (fl. 1399)
  - Herak (fl. April 1441), ancestor of Herakovići and Petrovići (Heraković-Popović) in Njeguši
- Pribil (fl. 1399)
  - Rajko or Rajič, ancestor of Rajičevići in Njeguši
- Ostoja (fl. 1399)
