= Njeguši =

Njeguši Његуши
- Village
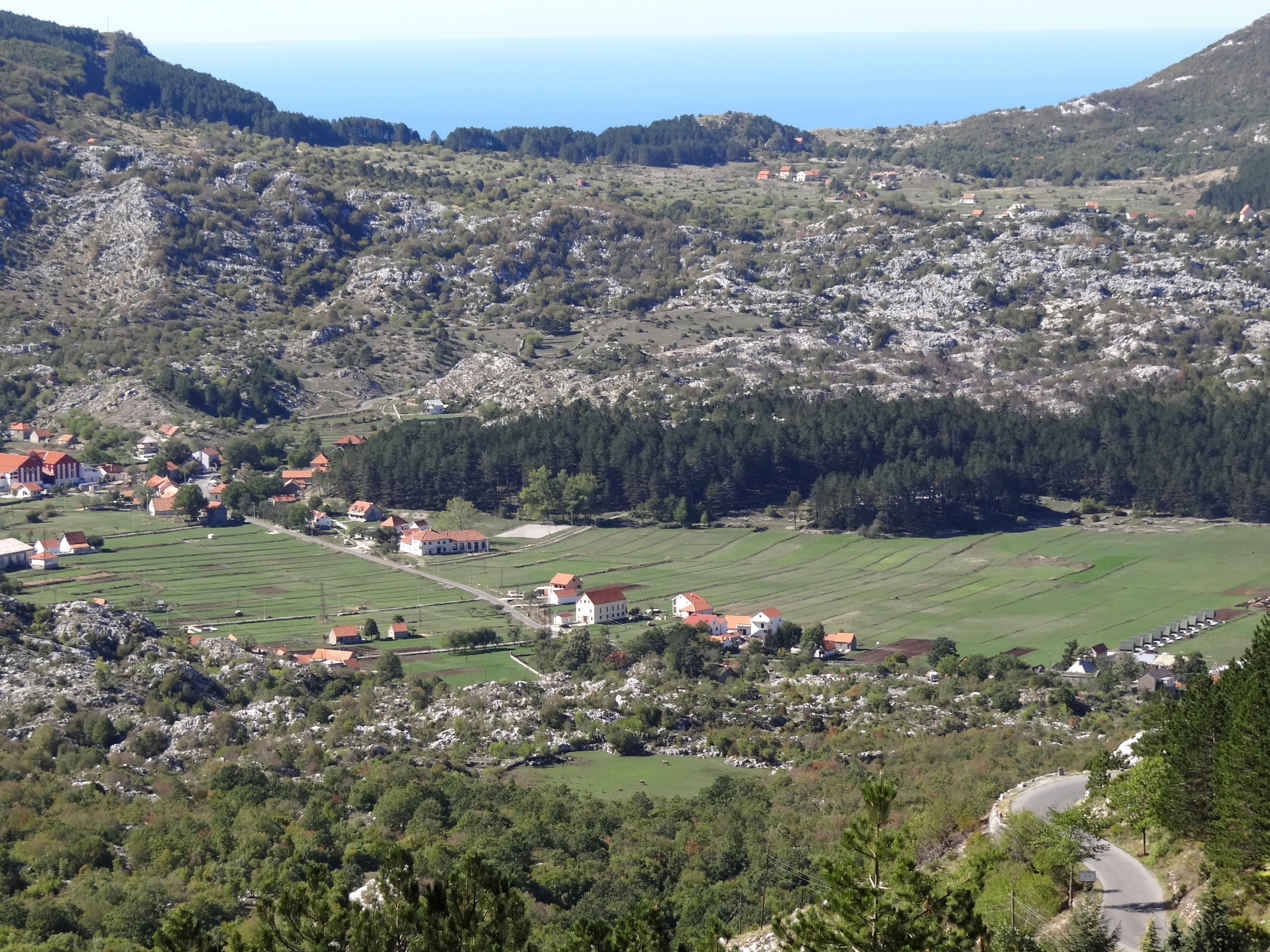
- View over Njeguši with the Bay of Kotor in the background, 2012

- Location within Montenegro
- Country: Montenegro
- Municipality: Cetinje

Population (2011)
  - Total: 35
- Time zone: UTC+1 (CET)
  - Summer (DST): UTC+2 (CEST)

Njeguši (Montenegrin Cyrillic: Његуши) is a village in the Cetinje Municipality of southern Montenegro, located on the slopes of Mount Lovćen, within the Lovćen national park. It is part of the historical territory of the Njeguši tribe.

== History ==
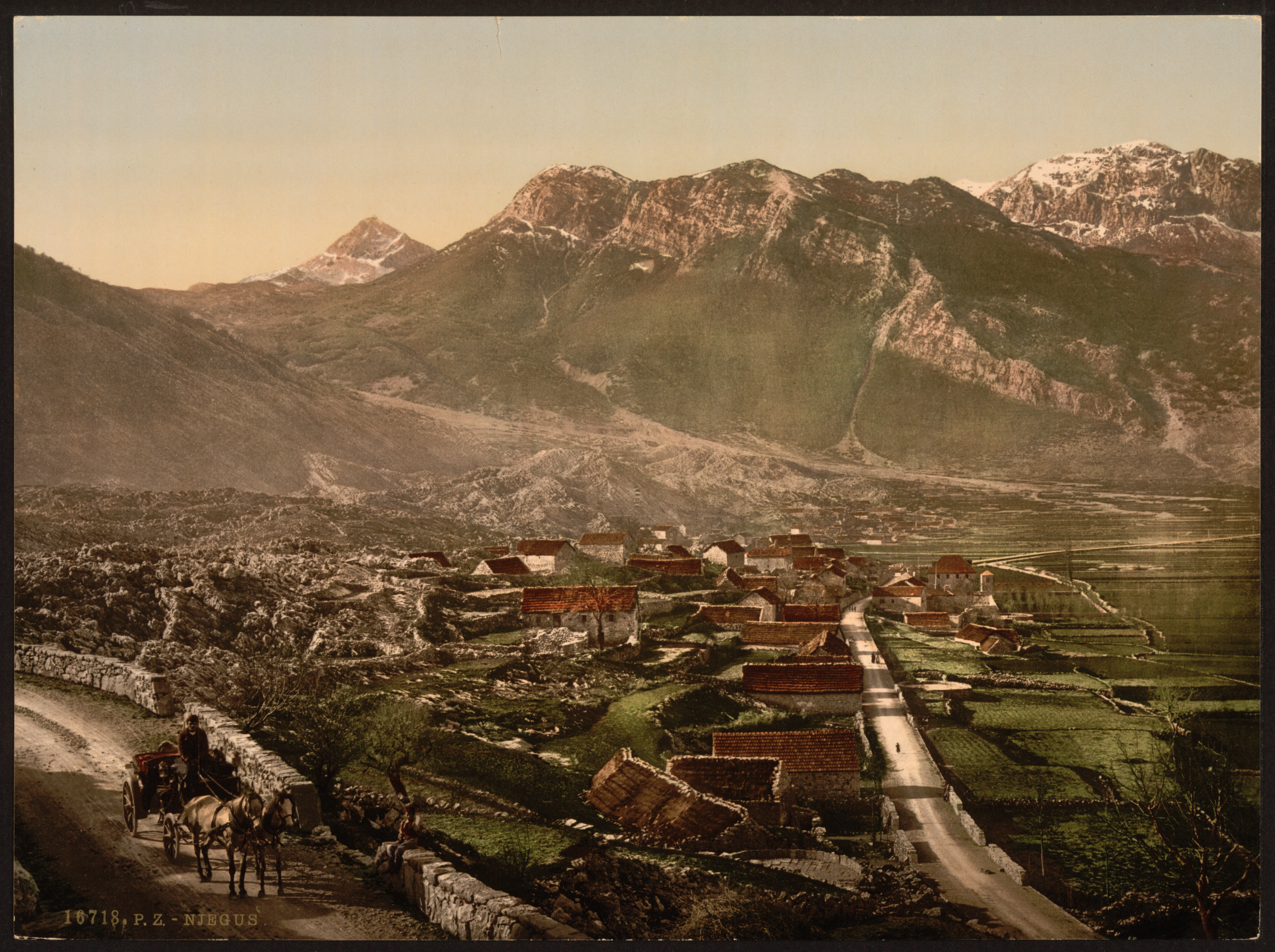
View of Njeguši, 1890s

Njeguši is best known for being the birthplace of the former ruling Petrović-Njegoš dynasty. The house of Petrović originally came from Herzegovina, (Note: According to tradition, the house may also have originated in Central Bosnia, near Zenica or Travnik) and migrated to the area of Njeguši during the end of the 14th century.

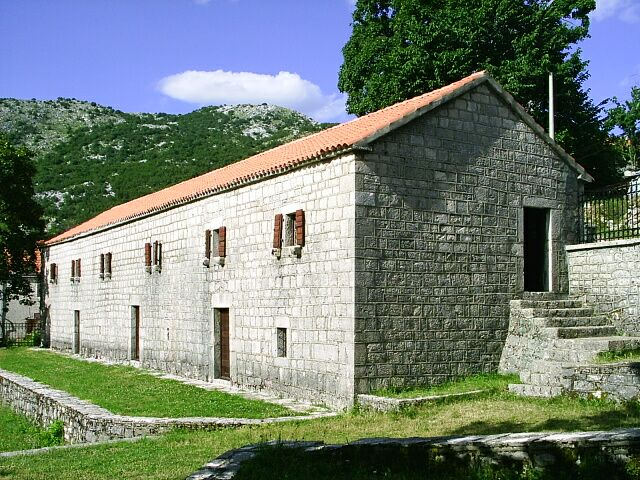
Njegoš birth house, part of the National Museum of Montenegro

According to a pseudoscientific theory by English anthropologist Mary Edith Durham, the village of Njeguši is the origin of the Ethiopian title of Negus and of the emperors of Ethiopia.

A statue passed by the Montenegrin Parliament in 2011 granted the royal family the property of King Nikola in the village.

== Demographics ==
According to the 2003 census, the village had 17 inhabitants, of whom 15 declared as Montenegrins, 1 as Serb, and 1 Unknown. According to 2011 census, there were 35 inhabitants, 33 of whom were Montenegrins, one did not want to reveal ethnicity and one was a Russian.
