= Nicholas I of Montenegro =

Last monarch of Montenegro from 1860 to 1918

Nikola I
- King of Montenegro, Head of the House of Petrović-Njegoš
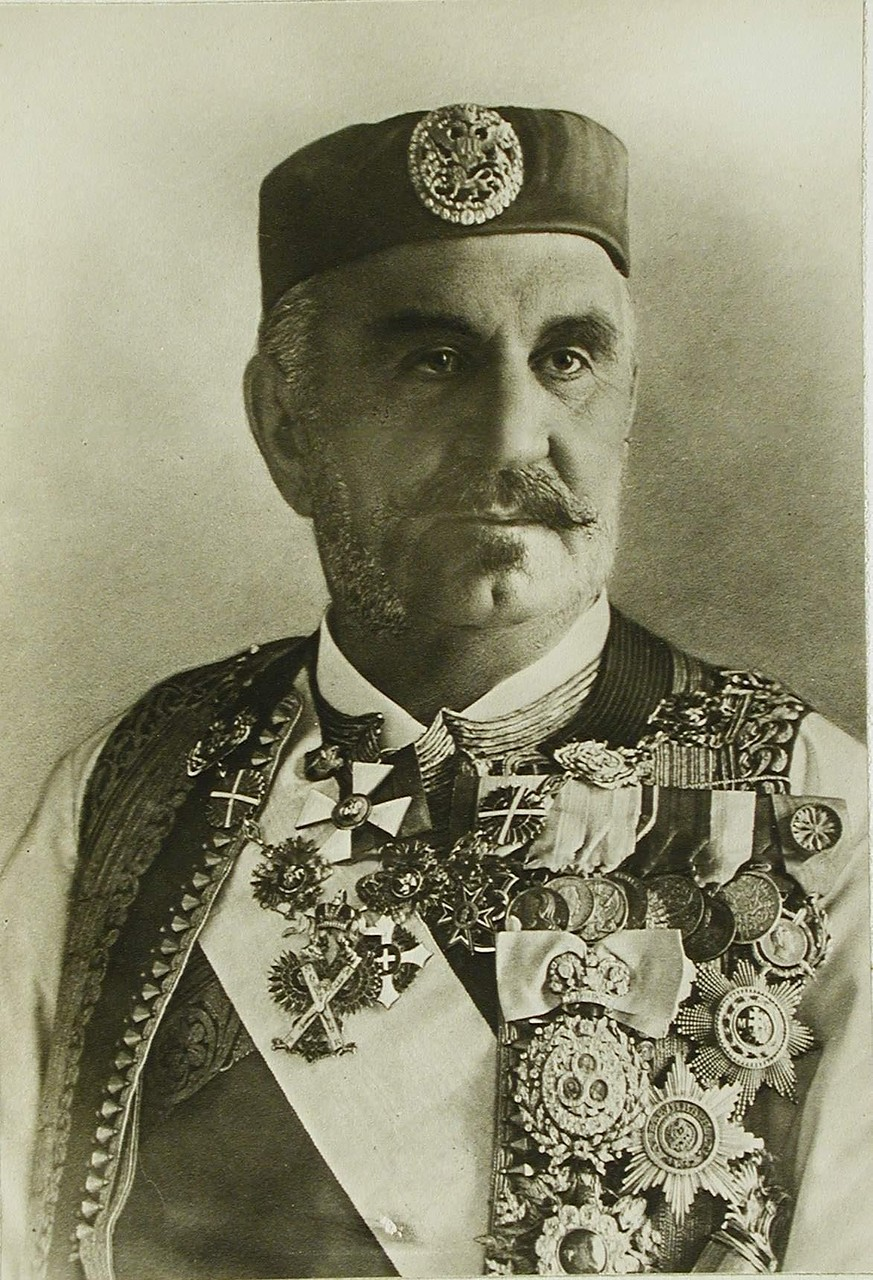
- Nicholas I c. 1910s

King of Montenegro
- Reign: 28 August 1910 – 26 November 1918
- Predecessor: Himself (as Prince of Montenegro)
- Successor: Title abolished

Prince of Montenegro
- Reign: 13 August 1860 – 28 August 1910
- Predecessor: Danilo I
- Successor: Himself (as King of Montenegro)
- Born: 7 October 1841; Njeguši, Montenegro
- Died: 1 March 1921 (aged 79); Cap d'Antibes, France
- Burial: 1 October 1989; Court Church, Cetinje, Montenegro
- Spouse: Milena Vukotić (m. 1860)
- Issue: List: Ljubica, Princess Peter Karađorđević; Grand Duchess Militza Nikolaevna of Russia; Grand Duchess Anastasia Nikolaevna of Russia; Princess Marica; Danilo, Crown Prince of Montenegro; Elena, Queen of Italy; Anna, Princess Francis Joseph of Battenberg; Princess Sofia; Prince Mirko; Princess Xenia; Princess Vjera; Prince Peter
Names
- Nikola Mirkov Petrović-Njegoš
- House: Petrović-Njegoš
- Father: Mirko Petrović-Njegoš, Grand Voivode of Grahovo
- Mother: Anastasija Stana Martinović

Nikola I Petrović-Njegoš (Serbian Cyrillic: Никола I Петровић-Његош; 7 October [O.S. 25 September] 1841 – 1 March 1921) was the last monarch of Montenegro from 1860 to 1918, reigning as prince from 1860 to 1910 and as the country's first and only king from 1910 to 1918. His grandsons were kings Alexander I of Yugoslavia and Umberto II of Italy, among others.

== Biography ==
=== Early life ===
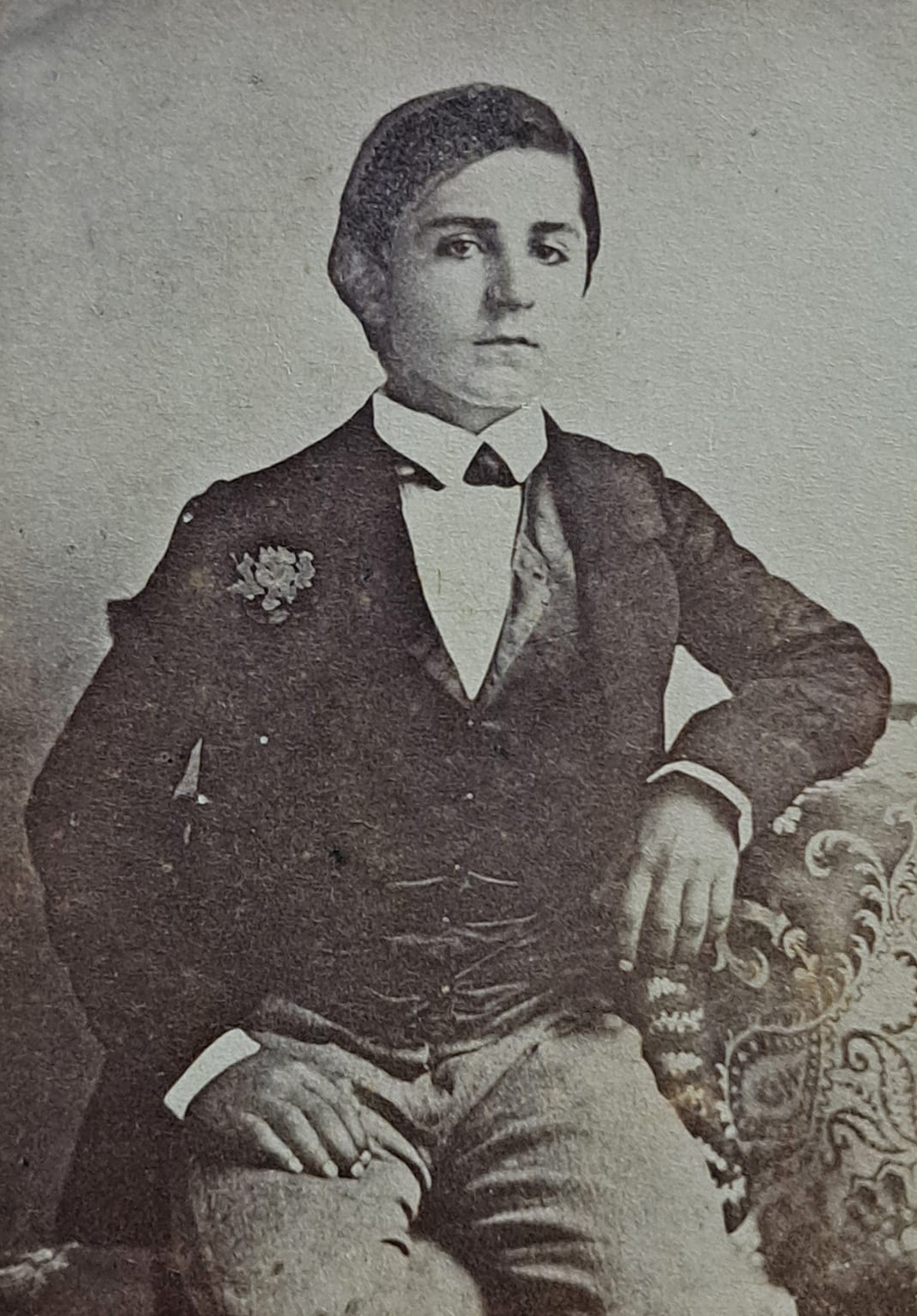
Nicholas Petrović-Njegoš as a boy during his schooldays in Trieste

Nikola was born in the village of Njeguši, the home of the reigning House of Petrović. He was the son of Mirko Petrović-Njegoš, a celebrated Montenegrin warrior (an elder brother to Danilo I of Montenegro) and his wife, Anastasija Martinovich (1824–1895). After 1696, when the dignity of vladika, or prince-bishop, became hereditary in the Petrović family, the sovereign power had descended from uncle to nephew, the vladikas belonging to the order of the black clergy (i.e., monastic clergy) who are forbidden to marry. A change was introduced by Danilo I, who declined the episcopal office, married and converted Montenegro into a secular principality. Danilo declared the throne hereditary in the direct male line. However, Mirko Petrović-Njegoš renounced his claim to the throne, and his son was nominated heir-presumptive. The old system of succession was thus incidentally continued.

Prince Nikola, who had been trained from infancy in martial and athletic exercises, spent a portion of his early boyhood in Trieste at the household of the Kustic family, to which his aunt, the princess Darinka, wife of Danilo II, belonged. The princess was an ardent francophile, and at her suggestion, the young heir-presumptive of the vladikas was sent to the Lycée Louis-le-Grand in Paris. Unlike his contemporary, King Milan of Serbia, Prince Nikola was little influenced in his tastes and habits by his Parisian education; the young highlander, whose keen patriotism, capability for leadership and poetic talents early displayed themselves, showed no inclination for the pleasures of the French capital, and eagerly looked forward to returning to his native land.

Nikola was a member of the "United Serbian Youth" (Уједињена омладина српска) during its existence (1866–1871). After the organization was prohibited in the Principality of Serbia and Austro-Hungary, the "Association for Serb Liberation and Unification" (Дружина за ослобођење и уједињење српско) was established by Nikola, Marko Popović, Simo Popović, Mašo Vrbica, Vasa Pelagić, and more, in Cetinje (1871).

Nicholas I of Montenegro was also reflected in literature. His most significant works are the Serb patriotic song "Onamo, 'namo!" (There, over there!), and the drama "The Balkan Empress".

=== Prince of Montenegro ===
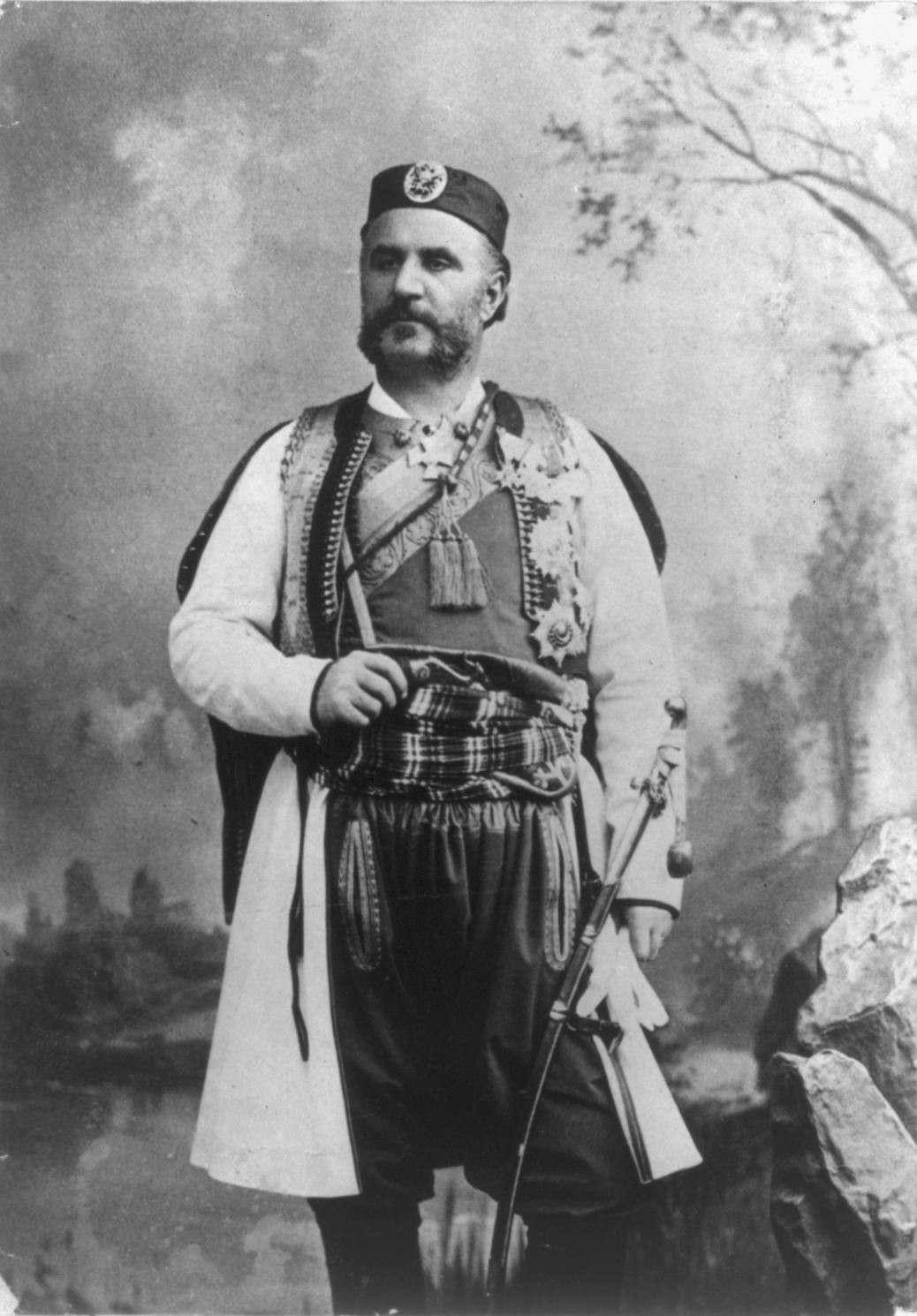
Prince Nicholas I in the national costume of Montenegro, 1909

While still in Paris, Nikola succeeded his assassinated uncle Danilo I as prince (13 August 1860). At age 19, in Cetinje, on 8 November 1860, he married Milena, 13 years old, daughter of a Vojvoda named Petar Vukotić and his wife Jelena Vojvodić.

In the period of peace which followed, Nikola carried out a series of military, administrative and educational reforms. The country was embroiled in a series of wars with the Ottoman Empire between 1862 and 1878. In 1867 he met the emperor Napoleon III in Paris, and in 1868 he undertook a journey to Russia, where he received an affectionate welcome from the tsar, Alexander II in St Petersburg. Being a champion of Orthodoxy, Russia provided military missions and supplies to Montenegro. He afterwards visited the courts of Berlin and Vienna. His efforts to enlist the sympathies of the Russian imperial family produced important results for Montenegro; considerable subsidies were granted by the tsar and tsaritsa for educational and other purposes, and supplies of arms and ammunition were sent to Cetinje. In 1871 Prince Dolgorukov arrived in Montenegro on a special mission from the tsar and distributed large sums of money among the people. In 1869 Prince Nikola, whose authority was now firmly established, succeeded in preventing the impetuous highlanders from aiding the Krivošijans in their revolt against the Austrian government; similarly in 1897 he checked the martial excitement caused by the outbreak of the Greco-Turkish War.

In 1876 Nikola declared war against Turkey; his military reputation was enhanced by the ensuing campaign, and still more by that of 1877/78, during which he captured Nikšić, Bar and Ulcinj. The war resulted in a considerable extension of the Montenegrin frontier and the acquisition of a seaboard on the Adriatic. Nikola justified the war as a revenge for the Battle of Kosovo (1389). In 1876 he sent a message to the Montenegrins in Herzegovina:

Under Murad I the Serbian Empire was destroyed, under Murad V it has to rise again. This is my wish and wish of all of us as well as the wish of almighty God.

The Congress of Berlin in 1878 recognised the independence of Montenegro, and in the succeeding decades Montenegro enjoyed considerable prosperity and stability. Education, communications and the army expanded greatly (the latter with support from Imperial Russia). In 1883 Nikola visited Abdul Hamid II, with whom he subsequently maintained the most cordial relations; in 1896 he celebrated the bicentenary of the Petrović dynasty, and in the same year he attended the coronation of Nicholas II; in May 1898 he visited Queen Victoria at Windsor Castle.

=== King of Montenegro ===
Styles of King Nikola I
- Reference style: His Majesty
- Spoken style: Your Majesty

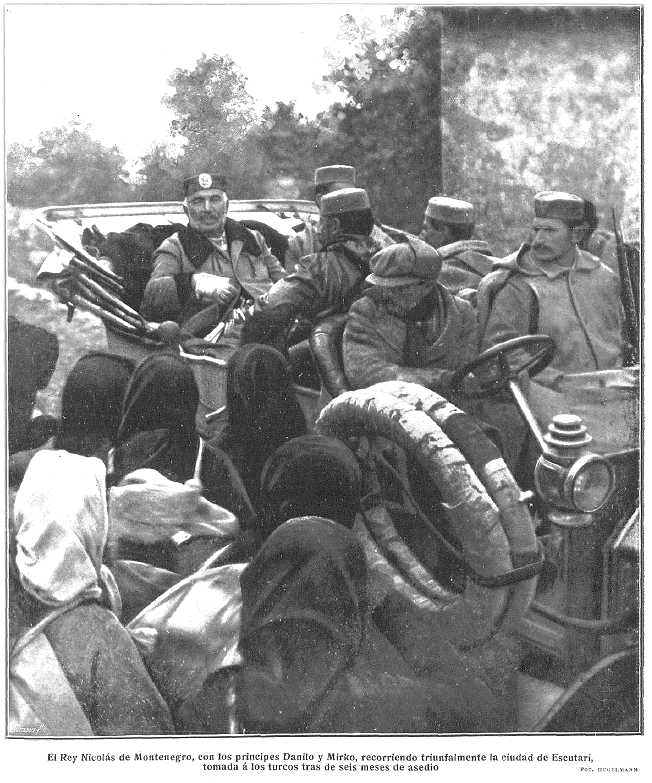
King Nicholas I triumphantly enters Shkodra in April 1913, after the siege.

In 1900 Nikola took the style of Royal Highness.

According to Bolati, the Montenegrin court was not grieving that much over the murder of King Alexander Obrenović, as they saw him as an enemy of Montenegro and obstacle to the unification of Serb Lands. "Although it wasn't said openly, it was thought that the Petrović dynasty would achieve [the unification]. All procedures of King Nikola shows that he himself believed that".

He gave Montenegro its first constitution in 1905 following pressure from a population eager for more freedom. He also introduced west-European style press freedom and criminal law codes. In 1906, he introduced Montenegrin currency, the perper. On 28 August 1910, during the celebration of his jubilee, he assumed the title of king, in accordance with a petition from the Skupština. He was at the same time gazetted field-marshal in the Russian army, an honor never previously conferred on any foreigner except the Duke of Wellington. When the Balkan Wars broke out in 1912 King Nikola was one of the most enthusiastic of the allies. He wanted to drive the Ottomans completely out of Europe. He defied the Concert of Europe and captured Scutari after a siege, despite the fact that they blockaded the whole coast of Montenegro. Again in the Great War which began in 1914 he was the first to go to Serbia's aid to repel the Austro-Hungarian forces from the Balkan Peninsula.

In January 1916, after the defeat of Serbia, Montenegro was also conquered by Austria-Hungary, and the King fled to Italy and then to France. The government transferred its operations to Bordeaux. After the end of the First World War, a meeting in Podgorica voted to depose Nikola and annex Montenegro to Serbia. A few days later, Serbia (including Montenegro) merged with the former South Slav territories of Austria-Hungary to form the Kingdom of Serbs, Croats and Slovenes, which was renamed Yugoslavia in 1929. Nikola, who was in exile in France, continued to claim the throne until his death in Antibes in 1921. He was buried in Italy. In 1989, the remains of Nikola, his queen Milena, and two of their twelve children were re-buried in Montenegro.

== Literary work ==
King Nikola I of Montenegro was also a poet, and his literary works are considered significant within Montenegro as well as Serbian history of literature. He is known for his patriotic songs, such as Onamo, 'namo!, and dramas like "Empress of the Balkans". His poems and plays often explored themes of Serbian identity, history, and aspirations for liberation and freedom.

== Family ==
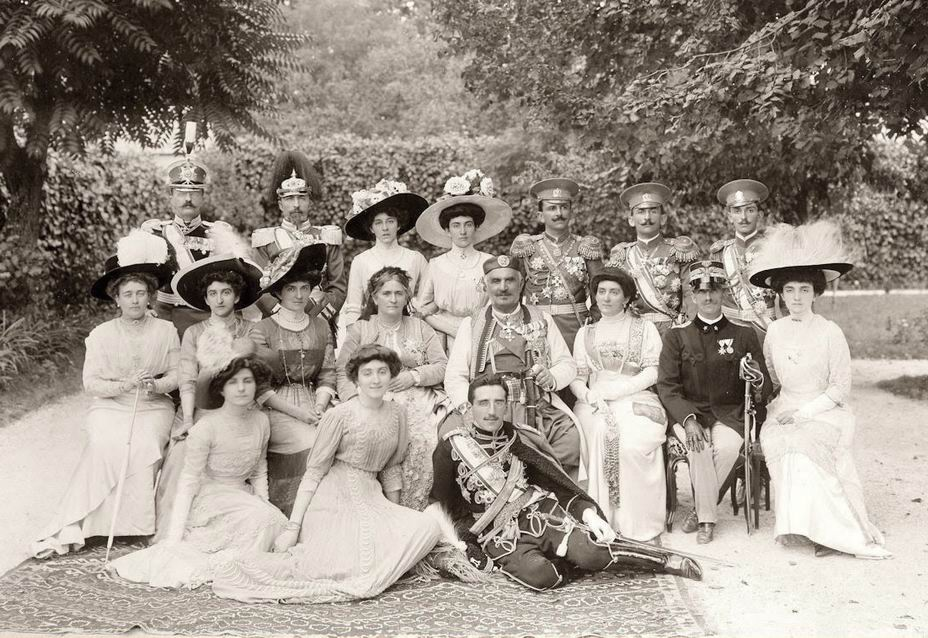
King Nicholas I with his wife, sons, daughters, grandchildren and sons- and daughters-in-law in Cetinje, Montenegro, 1910.

On 8 November 1860, Prince Nicholas married Milena, daughter of the voivode Petar Vukotić. Of his three sons, the eldest, Prince Danilo, married Duchess Jutta of Mecklenburg-Strelitz.

Five of Nicholas I's six daughters were married, each to princes and kings, giving Nicholas the nickname "the father-in-law of Europe". Nicholas shared this sobriquet with his contemporary Christian IX, King of Denmark. Christian IX's children also married members of European royalty from multiple countries.

The pretender to Nicholas I's throne is his great-grandson Nicholas, Crown Prince of Montenegro, son of Michael, Prince of Montenegro.

Name	Birth	Death	Notes	Children
Princess Ljubica of Montenegro	23 December 1864	28 March 1890	Married King Peter I of Serbia on 1 August 1883. They had five children, including Alexander I.	Princess Helen of Serbia; Princess Milena of Serbia; George, Crown Prince of Serbia; Alexander I of Yugoslavia; Prince Andrew of Serbia
Princess Milica of Montenegro (Grand Duchess Militza Nikolaevna of Russia)	26 July 1866	5 September 1951	Married Grand Duke Peter Nikolaievich of Russia on 26 July 1889. They had four children.	Princess Marina Petrovna of Russia; Prince Roman Petrovich of Russia; Princess Nadejda Petrovna of Russia; Princess Sofia Petrovna of Russia
Princess Anastasia of Montenegro (Grand Duchess Anastasia Nikolaevna Romanova of Russia)	4 January 1868	15 November 1935	Married George, Duke of Leuchtenberg, on 16 April 1889 and divorced on 15 November 1906; they had two children. She married secondly Grand Duke Nicholas Nicolaevich of Russia on 29 April 1907.	Sergei Georgievich, 8th Duke of Leuchtenberg; Princess Elena Georgievena, Duchess of Leuchtenberg, Princess Romanovskaya
Princess Marija of Montenegro	29 March 1869	7 May 1885	Died young.	
Danilo, Crown Prince of Montenegro	29 June 1871	24 September 1939	Married Duchess Jutta of Mecklenburg-Strelitz on 15 July 1899.	
Princess Elena of Montenegro (Queen Elena of Italy)	8 January 1873	28 November 1952	Married King Victor Emmanuel III of Italy on 24 October 1896. They had five children.	Princess Yolanda of Savoy; Princess Mafalda of Savoy; Umberto II of Italy; Giovanna of Savoy, Tsaritsa of Bulgaria; Princess Maria Francesca of Savoy
Princess Anna of Montenegro	18 August 1874	22 April 1971	Married Prince Franz Joseph of Battenberg on 18 May 1897.	
Princess Sofia of Montenegro	2 May 1876	14 June 1876	Died in infancy.	
Prince Mirko of Montenegro	17 April 1879	2 March 1918	Married Natalija Konstantinović on 25 July 1902. They had five sons.	Prince Shchepac of Montenegro; Prince Stanislaw of Montenegro; Prince Michael of Montenegro; Prince Pavle of Montenegro; Prince Emmanuel of Montenegro
Princess Xenia of Montenegro	22 April 1881	10 March 1960	Died unmarried.	
Princess Vjera of Montenegro	22 February 1887	31 October 1927	Died unmarried.	
Prince Peter of Montenegro	10 October 1889	7 May 1932	Married Violet Emily Wegner on 29 April 1924.	

== Honours ==
Serbian

- Founder and Grand Master of the Order of Saint Peter of Cetinje, 1870

Foreign

- Austrian Empire:
  - Knight of the Iron Crown, 1st Class, 1865
  - Grand Cross of the Imperial Order of Leopold, 1870
  - Grand Cross of St. Stephen, 1879
- Kingdom of Bulgaria:
  - Knight of Saints Cyril and Methodius, with Collar
  - Grand Cross of St. Alexander
  - Grand Cross of the Order of Bravery
  - Grand Cross of the Order of Civil Merit
- Denmark: Knight of the Elephant, 18 May 1889
- France:
  - Grand Officer of the Legion of Honour
  - Commander of the Order of Agricultural Merit
  - Officer of the Ordre des Palmes académiques
- Kingdom of Prussia:
  - Grand Cross of the Red Eagle, 15 February 1869
  - Knight of the Black Eagle
- Baden:
  - Knight of the House Order of Fidelity, 1893
  - Knight of the Order of Berthold the First, 1893
- Bavaria: Knight of St. Hubert, 1886
- (Saxe-Coburg and Gotha) (Duchy of Saxe-Altenburg) (Saxe-Meiningen) Ernestine duchies: Grand Cross of the Saxe-Ernestine House Order
- Hesse and by Rhine: Grand Cross of the Ludwig Order, 5 June 1897
- Mecklenburg: Grand Cross of the Wendish Crown, with Crown in Ore
- Kingdom of Greece: Grand Cross of the Redeemer
- Kingdom of Italy:
  - Knight of the Annunciation, 2 May 1893
  - Grand Cross of Saints Maurice and Lazarus
  - Commander of the Military Order of Savoy
- Holy See:
  - Collar of the Order of Pope Pius IX
  - Grand Cross of the Holy Sepulchre
- Empire of Japan: Grand Cordon of the Order of the Chrysanthemum, 11 January 1884
- Ottoman Empire: Order of Osmanieh, 1st Class
- Kingdom of Portugal: Grand Cross of the Sash of the Two Orders
- Kingdom of Romania:
  - Collar of the Order of Carol I
  - Grand Cross of the Star of Romania
- Russian Empire:
  - Knight of St. Andrew
  - Knight of St. Alexander Nevsky
  - Knight of the White Eagle
  - Knight of St. Anna, 1st Class
  - Knight of St. George, 3rd Class, 12 April 1877; 2nd Class, January 1878
- San Marino: Grand Cross of San Marino
- Kingdom of Serbia:
  - Grand Cross of the Star of Karađorđe
  - Grand Cross of the Cross of Takovo
  - Grand Cross of the White Eagle
  - Grand Cross of St. Sava
- Spain: Grand Cross of the Order of Charles III, 7 June 1883
- United Kingdom: Honorary Grand Cross of the Royal Victorian Order, 26 March 1897

== In popular culture ==
- King Nikola and the Kingdom of Montenegro are remembered briefly in F. Scott Fitzgerald's The Great Gatsby, where its eponymous main character reminisces on how for his accomplishments and heroic endeavors during the First World War the King confers unto him the highest honor of the Kingdom, the Orderi di Danilo. Gatsby duly presents the medal for his guest to examine which reads on the legend Montenegro, Nicolas Rex and on its reverse: Major Jay Gatsby - For Valour Extraordinary.
- The character of the King in Maurice Chevalier's movie The Merry Widow (1934) is based on Nicholas.

== Notes ==
1. After his death, he was initially buried in a Russian Orthodox church in Sanremo. On 1 October 1989, his remains (and the remains of his wife Queen Milena and their daughters Princesses Ksenija and Vjera) were repatriated to Cetinje where they were given a state funeral and interred in the Court Church near the Cetinje Monastery.

== Sources ==
Nicholas I of Montenegro House of Petrović-Njegoš Born: 7 October 1841 Died: 1 March 1921
Regnal titles
Preceded by Danilo I	Prince of Montenegro; 13 August 1860 – 28 August 1910	Proclaimed king
New title	King of Montenegro; 28 August 1910 – 26 November 1918	Montenegro annexed by Serbia
Titles in pretence
Montenegro annexed by Serbia	— TITULAR — King of Montenegro; 26 November 1918 – 1 March 1921	Succeeded by Danilo II
