= Vladika =

Slavonic honorific title of address for a bishop

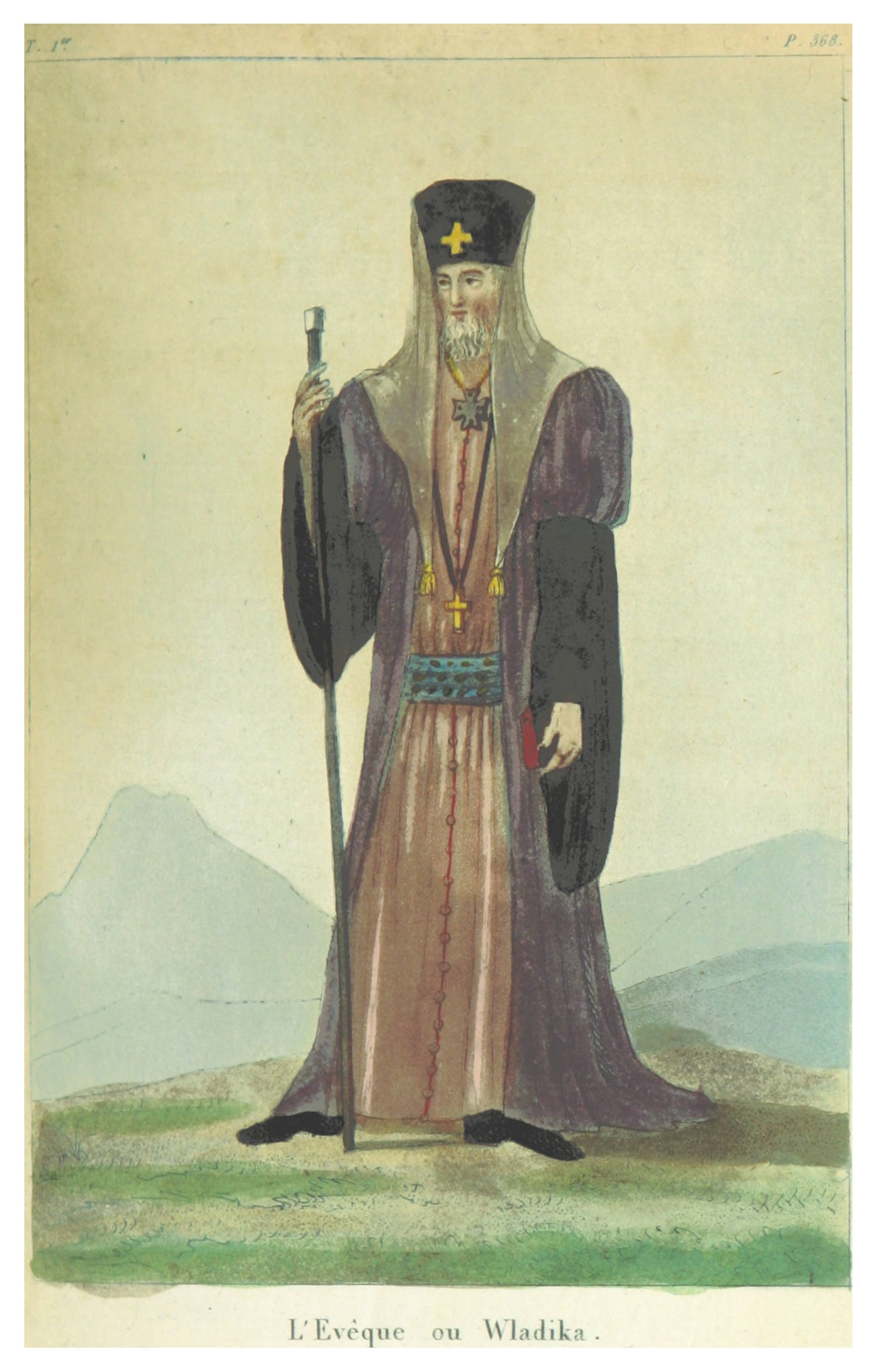
Bishop Petar I. Petrovic (1747–1830), as portrayed in L'Evêque ou Wladika

Vladika or Wladika (Serbian: владика, Russian: влады́ка, Ukrainian: владика) is an informal Slavic title and address for bishops in the Eastern Orthodox Church and Eastern Catholic Churches, specifically the Russian, Serbian, Bulgarian, and American Orthodox Churches. In Old Church Slavonic, the meaning of the word is equivalent to English mister or lord.

== Prince-Bishopric of Montenegro ==
From the early 16th to the mid-19th century in Montenegro, the title referred to the bishop of Cetinje, the highest-ranking ecclesiastical authority in the region. This bishop not only oversaw religious affairs but also served as the prince-bishop (or secular leader) of the Prince-Bishopric of Montenegro, effectively combining spiritual and temporal power. The prince-bishop acted as both a religious shepherd and a political ruler, guiding the Montenegrin clans in matters of governance, defense, and diplomacy, while maintaining the independence of Montenegro from neighboring powers. This unique arrangement reflected the intertwining of church and state in Montenegrin history and played a crucial role in preserving the country’s autonomy during centuries of external pressure.

== See also ==
- List of Metropolitans of Montenegro
- Vladike
