= Petrović-Njegoš dynasty =

Ruling dynasty of Montenegro from 1697 to 1918

Petrović-Njegoš Петровић-Његош
- Royal house
- Country: Montenegro: (Prince-Bishopric of Montenegro) Prince-Bishopric; (Principality of Montenegro) Principality; (Kingdom of Montenegro) Kingdom
- Founded: 1697; 329 years ago
- Founder: Prince-Bishop Danilo I
- Current head: Prince Nicholas
- Final ruler: King Nicholas I
- Titles: King of Montenegro; Prince of Montenegro; Prince-Bishop of Montenegro
- Styles: "Majesty"; "Higness"; "Grace"; "His Eminence" (clerical)
- Estate: Cetinje Royal Palace
- Deposition: 1918; 108 years ago

The House of Petrović-Njegoš (Serbian Cyrillic: Петровић-Његош, pl. Petrović-Njegoši / Петровић-Његоши) is an old Serbian noble family that ruled Montenegro from 1697 to 1918.

== History ==
=== Origin ===
"Bogut" or "Boguta" is believed to be the oldest known ancestor of the Petrović-Njegoš family. Bogut was alive at the time of the Battle of Velbazhd (1330) and the building of Visoki Dečani, and perhaps into the 1340s. According to tradition and recorded by some historians, the ancestors of the Petrović family settled in Muževice at the end of the 14th century, from the Bosnia region, from the area of Zenica or Travnik. It is possible that Bogut at that time had moved to Drobnjaci with his son, Đurađ Bogutović. Đurađ or some of his sons were in the entourage of Marko Drago, an affluent Serbian nobleman who had served Serbian lord Vuk Branković (1345-1397), and as such they are believed to have also served the Branković family. Đurađ and his five sons "from Drobnjaci" are mentioned in a document dating March 1, 1399, in which they gave several items to the depository of Dapko Vasilijev, an affluent Kotoran nobleman.

=== Rule of Montenegro ===
Montenegro was ruled from its inception by vladikas (prince-bishops) since 1516, who had a dual temporal and spiritual role, subordinate to the Serbian Patriarchate of Peć until its dissolution in 1766. In 1697, the office was made hereditary in the Petrović-Njegoš family. However, since Orthodox bishops are required to be celibate, the crown passed from uncle to nephew. In 1852, Prince-Bishop Danilo II opted to marry and to secularize Montenegro, becoming Prince Danilo I. His successor, Nikola I, created the Kingdom of Montenegro in August 1910, with himself as King.

In 1916, King Nikola I was ousted by the invasion and occupation of his country by Austria-Hungary, during World War I. He was formally deposed by the Podgorica Assembly in 1918, and the country merged with the Kingdom of Serbia and shortly thereafter merged again with the State of Slovenes, Croats and Serbs to form the Kingdom of Serbs, Croats and Slovenes (later renamed as the Kingdom of Yugoslavia in 1929).

=== After Yugoslavia ===
A period of eighty years of control from Belgrade followed, during which time Nikola I died in exile in France in 1921, followed shortly afterwards by the surprise abdication of his son and heir, Danilo III, the same year. The latter's nephew, Michael Petrović-Njegoš, inherited the titles of his predecessors whilst in exile in France. After a titular 11-year "reign" under the regency of one of his grandfather's generals, Anto Gvozdenović, Michael gave up his claim to the throne and swore allegiance to the Kingdom of Yugoslavia. He survived arrest and internment by order of Adolf Hitler for refusing to head up a puppet Montenegrin state aligned to the Axis powers. Later, he served the SFR Yugoslavia as Head of Protocol. He was succeeded by his son Nicholas Petrović-Njegoš in 1986. In 2006, Montenegro went on to achieve full sovereignty in the 2006 independence referendum.

In 2011, Montenegro recognized an official role for the Royal House of Petrović-Njegoš in Montenegro: to promote Montenegrin identity, culture and traditions through cultural, humanitarian and other non-political activities, which has been interpreted as a "creeping restoration" of the monarchy.

The present head of the house is Nicholas, Crown Prince of Montenegro.

=== Modern role ===
In July 2011, the Parliament of Montenegro adopted the Law on the Status of the Descendants of the Petrović Njegoš Dynasty. The law allows descendants of the dynasty to use heraldic royal symbols and grants them land that belonged to the King. It grants them property and buildings in Njegusi and Cetinje, the former capital city, as well as an apartment in Podgorica. It established the Petrovic-Njegos Foundation, which would receive financing from Montenegro’s state budget amounting to some €4 million.

== List of monarchs ==
Picture	Title Name	Birth	Reign	Marriage(s) Issue	Death	Claim	Notes
	^{Prince-Bishop} Danilo I	1670; Njeguši, Montenegro	19 July 1697 – 11 January 1735 (37 years, 176 days)	—	11 January 1735; Podmaine Monastery, Venice (aged 64–65)	Elected by the Montenegrin Tribal Assembly	
	^{Prince-Bishop} Sava II	18 January 1702; Njeguši, Montenegro	11 January 1735 – 7 March 1781 (46 years, 55 days)	—	9 March 1782; Podmaine Monastery, Venice (aged 80)	First cousin of Danilo I	Coruled with Basil III from 1750–1766.
	^{Prince-Bishop} Basil III	1709; Njeguši, Montenegro	11 August 1750 – 10 March 1766 (15 years, 211 days)	—	10 March 1766; St. Petersburg, Russian Empire (aged 56–57)	Nephew of Danilo I	Co-ruled with Sava II
Out of power for 3 years, 220 days.
	^{Prince-Bishop} Petar I	1748; Njeguši, Montenegro	13 October 1784 – 30 October 1830 (46 years, 17 days)	—	30 October 1830; Cetinje, Montenegro (aged 81–82)	Elected by the Sinod. Grandnephew of Danilo I	
	^{Prince-Bishop} Petar II	13 November 1813; Njeguši, Montenegro	30 October 1830 – 31 October 1851 (21 years, 1 day)	—	31 October 1851; Cetinje, Montenegro (aged 37)	The Will of Petar I, his uncle.	
	^{Prince-Bishop;}^{Prince} Danilo II; Danilo I	25 May 1826; Njeguši, Montenegro	31 October 1851 – 13 August 1860 (8 years, 287 days)	Darinka Kvekić; 12 January 1855; 1 daughter	13 August 1860; Kotor, Austrian Empire (aged 34)	The Will of Petar II, his uncle.	Assassinated in Kotor.
	^{Prince;}^{King} Nicholas I	7 October 1841; Njeguši, Montenegro	13 August 1860 – 26 November 1918 (58 years, 105 days)	Milena Vukotić; 8 November 1860; 12 children	1 March 1921; Cap d'Antibes, French Republic (aged 79)	Nephew of Danilo I	Exiled in January 1916. Deposed by the Podgorica Assembly.

== Heads of the House since 1918 ==
Picture	Name	Birth	Headship	Marriage(s) Issue	Death	Claim
	Nicholas I	7 October 1841; Njeguši, Montenegro	26 November 1918 – 1 March 1921 (2 years, 95 days)	Milena Vukotić; 8 November 1860; 12 children	1 March 1921; Cap d'Antibes, French Republic (aged 79)	Deposed king of Montenegro
	Crown Prince Danilo	29 June 1871; Cetinje, Montenegro	1 March 1921 – 7 March 1921 (6 days)	Jutta of Mecklenburg-Strelitz; 27 July 1899; No children	24 September 1939; Vienna, Austria, Nazi Germany (aged 67)	Eldest son of Nicholas I and Milena Vukotić.
	Prince Michael	14 September 1908; Podgorica, Montenegro	7 March 1921 – 24 March 1986 (65 years, 17 days)	Geneviève Prigent; 27 January 1941 – 11 April 1949; 1 son	24 March 1986; Paris, France (aged 77)	Nephew of Crown Prince Danilo
	Prince Nicholas	7 July 1944; Saint-Nicolas-du-Pélem, France (age 82)	24 March 1986 – present (40 years, 236 days)	Francine Navarro; 27 November 1976 – 6 August 2008; 2 children		Son of Prince Michael and Geneviève Prigent

== Male descendants of Nicholas I ==
The list below includes male members of the Petrović-Njegoš dynasty. Bold denotes the current head of the House.

- King Nicholas I (1841–1921)
  - Crown Prince Danilo (1872–1939)
  - Prince Mirko, Grand Duke of Grahovo and Zeta (1879–1918)
    - Prince Stephan (1903–1908)
    - Prince Stanislaw (1905–1908)
    - Prince Michael (1908–1986)
      - **Prince Nicholas** (born 1944)
        - Prince Boris (born 1980)
    - Prince Paul (1910–1933)
    - Prince Emmanuel (1912–1928)
  - Prince Peter, Grand Duke of Zahumlie (1889–1932)

== See also ==
- List of heads of former ruling families
- The Petrović-Njegoš family tree
