= Law on the Status of the Descendants of the Petrović Njegoš Dynasty =

The Law on the Status of the Descendants of the Petrović Njegoš Dynasty (Montenegrin: Zakon o Statusu Potomaka Dinastije Petrović Njegoš) is a 2011 statute that rehabilitates the Royal House of Montenegro. It was passed in the parliament on 12 July 2011, and was signed by President of the Parliament Ranko Krivokapić. The law “governs the important issues regarding the status of the descendants of the Petrović Njegoš dynasty [for the historical and moral rehabilitation of the Petrović-Njegoš dynasty], whose dethroning was contrary to the Constitution of the Principality of Montenegro, a violent act of annexation in the year 1918.” (Article 1).

== Text ==
The Law on the Status of the Descendants of the Petrović Njegoš Dynasty is reproduced here in full in Montenegrin and English:

Na osnovu člana 82 stav 1 tačka 2 i člana 91 stav 2 Ustava Crne Gore, Skupština Crne Gore 24. saziva, na desetoj śednici prvog redovnog (proljećnjeg) zasijedanja u 2011. godini, dana 12. jula 2011. godine, donijela je
Pursuant to Article 82, paragraph 1, item 2 and Article 91, paragraph 2, of the Constitution of Montenegro, the 24th convocation of the Montenegrin Parliament, at the tenth session of the first regular (Spring) session in 2011, on 12 July 2011, adopted a
ZAKON O STATUSU POTOMAKA DINASTIJE PETROVIĆ NJEGOŠ
LAW ON THE STATUS OF THE DESCENDANTS OF THE PETROVIĆ NJEGOŠ DYNASTY
Član 1
Article 1
Radi istorijske i moralne rehabilitacije dinastije Petrović Njegoš, ovim zakonom se uređuju pitanja od značaja za status potomaka dinastije Petrović Njegoš, koja je detronizovana protivno Ustavu za Knjaževinu Crnu Goru, aktom nasilne aneksije države iz 1918. godine.
For the historical and moral rehabilitation of the Petrović Njegoš dynasty, this law governs the important issues regarding the status of the descendants of the Petrović Njegoš dynasty, whose dethroning was contrary to the Constitution of the Principality of Montenegro, a violent act of annexation in the year 1918.
Član 2
Article 2
Tradiciju dinastije Petrović Njegoš nastavljaju potomci kralja Nikole I Petrovića Njegoša, po muškoj liniji i njihove supruge (u daljem tekstu: potomci dinastije).
The tradition of the Petrović Njegoš dynasty continues in the descendants of King Nicholas I Petrović Njegoš, in the male line and their wives (hereinafter referred to as: the descendants of the dynasty).
Član 3
Article 3
Potomci dinastije čuvaju i afirmišu tradiciju dinastije Petrović Njegoš vršenjem kulturnih, humanitarnih i drugih nepolitičkih poslova u cilju afirmacije crnogorskog identiteta, kulture i tradicije.
The descendants of the dynasty guard and affirm the tradition of the Petrović Njegoš dynasty in the exercise of cultural, humanitarian and other non-political affairs, to affirm the Montenegrin identity, culture and traditions.
Član 4
Article 4
Potomci dinastije dužni su da poštuju integritet i ustavni poredak Crne Gore.
The descendants of the dynasty are obliged to respect the integrity and constitutional order of Montenegro.
Član 5
Article 5
Potomke dinastije u poslovima iz člana 3 ovog zakona predstavlja najstariji muški potomak (u daljem tekstu: predstavnik potomaka dinastije).
Pravo predstavljanja potomaka dinastije prenosi se na muškog nasljednika najstarijeg muškog potomka.
The descendants of the dynasty referred to in Article 3 of this Law is the eldest male descendant (hereinafter referred to as the: representative of the descendants of the dynasty).

The right to be the representative of the descendants of the dynasty is passed to the male heir of the eldest male descendant.

Član6
Article 6
Predstavnik potomaka dinastije može da upotrebljava heraldičke simbole dinastije Petrović Njegoš.
The representative of the descendants of the dynasty can use the heraldic symbols of the Petrović Njegoš dynasty.
Član 7
Article 7
Predsjednik Crne Gore, predsjednik Skupštine Crne Gore i predsjednik Vlade Crne Gore mogu ovlastiti predstavnika potomaka dinastije da obavi pojedine protokolarne i nepolitičke poslove.
The President of Montenegro, the President of the Parliament of Montenegro and the Prime Minister of Montenegro may authorise the representative of the descendants of the dynasty to perform individual protocol or non-political activities.
Član 8
Article 8
Potomci dinastije mogu steći crnogorsko državljanstvo bez obaveze otpusta iz državljanstva druge države.
Ukoliko potomak dinastije stekne državljanstvo druge države ne gubi crnogorsko državljanstvo.
The descendants of the dynasty may acquire Montenegrin citizenship without the obligation to revoke the citizenship of another country.

If a descendant of the dynasty acquires the citizenship of another country they will not lose Montenegrin citizenship.

Član 9
Article 9
U cilju afirmacije crnogorske kulture i učešća u humanitarnim i razvojnim aktivnostima od javnog interesa za Crnu Goru i njenu tradiciju, osniva se “Fondacija Petrović Njegoš” (u daljem tekstu: Fondacija).
Sjedište Fondacije je u Crnoj Gori.
Na Fondaciju se primjenjuju odredbe zakona kojim se uređuje rad nevladinih fondacija, ako ovim zakonom nije drukčije određeno.
In order to affirm Montenegrin culture and participation in humanitarian and development activities in the public interest of Montenegro and its traditions, establish the “Foundation Petrović Njegoš“ (hereinafter: the Foundation).

The Foundation has its seat in Montenegro. The Foundation is governed by the provisions of the law regulating the work of foundations, unless this law provides otherwise.

Član10
Article 10
Predstavnik potomaka dinastije je predsjednik Upravnog odbora Fondacije.
U ostvarivanju interesa Fondacije, predsjednik Upravnog odbora Fondacije i članovi Fondacije ne mogu se baviti političkim aktivnostima.
Članovi Fondacije samostalno upravljaju imovinom Fondacije, osim sredstvima koja se, u smislu člana 11 stav 2 ovog zakona, izdvajaju predstavniku dinastije.
The representative of the descendants of the dynasty is Chairman of the Board of the Foundation.

In the managing the affairs of the Foundation, the Chairman of the Board of the Foundation and members of the Foundation cannot deal with political activities. Members of the Foundation independently manage the assets of the Foundation, other than the funds that, in accordance with Article 11, paragraph 2 of this law, are distinct for the representative of the dynasty.

Član 11
Article 11
Sredstva za rad Fondacije u prvih sedam godina od osnivanja Fondacije, u ukupnom iznosu od 4.300.000 eura, obezbijediće se u budžetu Crne Gore.
Sredstva iz stava 1 ovog člana u ukupnom iznosu od 1.500.000 eura izdvojiće se predstavniku dinastije i to iznos od 1.000.000 eura u 2011.godini i iznos od 500.000 eura u 2012.godini, a preostali iznos u jednakim ratama u narednih šest godina, počev od 2012.godine, kroz redovno finansiranje Fondacije.
Funding for the work of the Foundation in the first seven years of the establishment of the Foundation, to a total of Euro 4.3 million, will be provided from the budget of Montenegro.

The funds referred to in paragraph 1 of this Article in the amount of Euro 1,500,000 will be set aside for the representative of the dynasty and the amount of Euro 1,000,000 in 2011 and the amount of Euro 500,000 in 2012, and the remaining amount in equal instalments over the following six years, starting from 2012, through regular financing of the Foundation.

Član 12
Article 12
Potomcima dinastije daje se na trajno koriš ćenje kuća kralja Nikole I Petrovića Njegoša na Njegušima površine 236 m2, sa pripadajućim dvorištem površine 500 m2 i zemljište-livada površine 1270 m2, upisani u list nepokretnosti broj 128 KO Njeguši.
Potomcima dinastije izgradiće se i dati u svojinu porodična kuća na Cetinju, površine do 300 m2, sa pripadajućim zemljištem površine do 5000 m2 i dati u svojinu stan u Podgorici površine do 130 m2.
Porodična kuća iz stava 2 ovog člana izgradiće se prema tehničkoj dokumentaciji koju, u skladu sa zakonom i planskim dokumentima, predloži predstavnik potomaka dinastije, u roku od dvije godine od dana revizije glavnog projekta.
The descendants of the dynasty have the permanent use of the house of King Nikola I Petrović Njegoš in Njeguši with a surface of 236m2, with a garden of 500m2 and meadow area of 1,270m2, enrolled in the real estate list number 128 KO Njeguši.

The descendants of the dynasty will have a house built and given to the family in Cetinje, measuring up to 300m2, with a land area up to 5,000m2, and also given an apartment in Podgorica with an area up to 130m2. The dynasty’s house referred to in paragraph 2 of this Article shall be constructed in accordance with technical documentation, in accordance with the law and planning documents, the suggestions of the representative of the dynasty, within two years from the date of revision of the principal project.

Član 13
Article 13
Radi vršenja poslova iz člana 7 ovog zakona predstavnik potomaka dinastije ima pravo da koristi reprezentativne objekte i druga sredstva u državnoj imovini, u skladu sa propisom Vlade Crne Gore (u daljem tekstu: Vlada).
Za obavljanje poslova iz člana 3 ovog zakona i rad Fondacije potomci dinastije imaju pravo isključivog koriš ćenja prvog spratnog dijela dvorca »Kruševac« u Podgorici, a za protokolarne potrebe prizemni dio sa pravom prioriteta u odnosu na druge korisnike.
To carry out the tasks referred to in Article 7 of this Law, the representative of the descendants of the dynasty has the right to use the facilities and other resources of State property, in accordance with the regulations of the Government of Montenegro (hereinafter: the Government).

To perform the activities referred to in Article 3 of this law and the work of the Foundation the descendants of the dynasty will have the right to exclusive use of the first floor of the "Kruševac" Palace in Podgorica, and for protocol requirements the use of the ground floor in priority to other users.

Član 14
Article 14
U slučaju prodaje porodične kuće sa pripadajucim zemljištem iz člana 12 stav 2 ovog zakona država Crna Gora ima pravo preče kupovine po cijeni koja je utvrdjena na dan sticanja svojine na tim nepokretnostima.
In the case of a sale of the descendants’ house with land referred to in Article 12, paragraph 2 of this Law, the State of Montenegro has pre-emption rights at a price that is determined on the date of acquisition their property.
Član 15
Article 15
Administrativne i tehničke poslove za potrebe predstavnika potomaka dinastije u Crnoj Gori vrši Državni protokol.
Korišćenje, opremanje, čuvanje i održavanje nepokretnosti iz člana 12 stav 1 i člana 13 stav 2
ovog zakona vršiće se u skladu sa propisom Vlade.
Administrative and technical support for the representative of the descendants of the dynasty in Montenegro is to be conducted by the State Protocol.

The use of equipment, storage and the maintenance of immovable property referred to in Article 12, paragraph 1 and Article 13 paragraph 2 of this Law shall be in accordance with Government regulation.

Član 16
Article 16
Predstavnik potomaka dinastije ima pravo na mjesečna primanja u visini mjesečne bruto zarade Predsjednika Crne Gore.
Pravo iz stava 1 ovog člana predstavnik potomaka dinastije stiče nakon isplate poslednje rate za finansiranje Fondacije iz člana 11 stav 2 ovog zakona.
Sredstva za namjene iz stava 1 ovog člana, člana 12 stav 2 i člana 15 ovog zakona obezbjeđuju se u budžetu Crne Gore.
The representative of the descendants of the dynasty is entitled to a monthly income in the amount of monthly gross earnings of the President of Montenegro.

The right referred to in paragraph 1 of this Article, the representative of the descendants of the dynasty acquires upon payment of the final installment for funding to the Foundation under Article 11, paragraph 2 of this law. Funds for the purposes of paragraph 1 of this Article, Article 12, paragraph 2, and Article 15 of this Law will be provided for from the budget of Montenegro.

Član 17
Article 17
Propisi iz člana 13 stav 1 i člana 15 stav 2 ovog zakona donijeće se u roku od šest mjeseci od dana stupanja na snagu ovog zakona.
The provisions of Article 13, paragraph 1 and Article 15, paragraph 2 of this law will commence within six months from the date of entry into force of this Law.
Član 18
Article 18
Ovaj zakon stupa na snagu osmog dana od dana objavljivanja u "Službenom listu Crne Gore".
This law shall enter into force eight days after its publication in the “Official Gazette of Montenegro”.

Broj 35/11-1/15 EPA 569 XXIV Podgorica, 12. jula 2011. Godine

SKUPŠTINA CRNE GORE 24. SAZIVA

PREDŚEDNIK Ranko Krivokapić

Number 35/11-1/15

EPA 569 XXIV Podgorica, 12 July 2011

24TH CONVOCATION PARLIAMENT OF MONTENEGRO

PRESIDENT Ranko Krivokapić
