= Wehner =

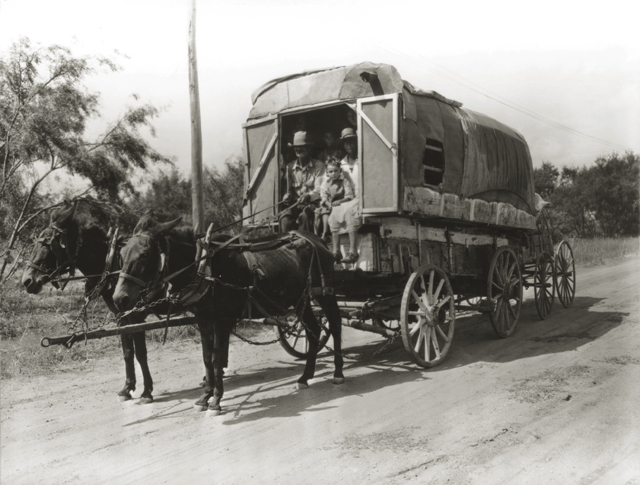
- Haskell County, Texas family looking for cotton to pick, 1931

Origin
- Language: Middle German
- Meaning: coachman, or wagon maker
- Region of origin: Middle Germany

Other names
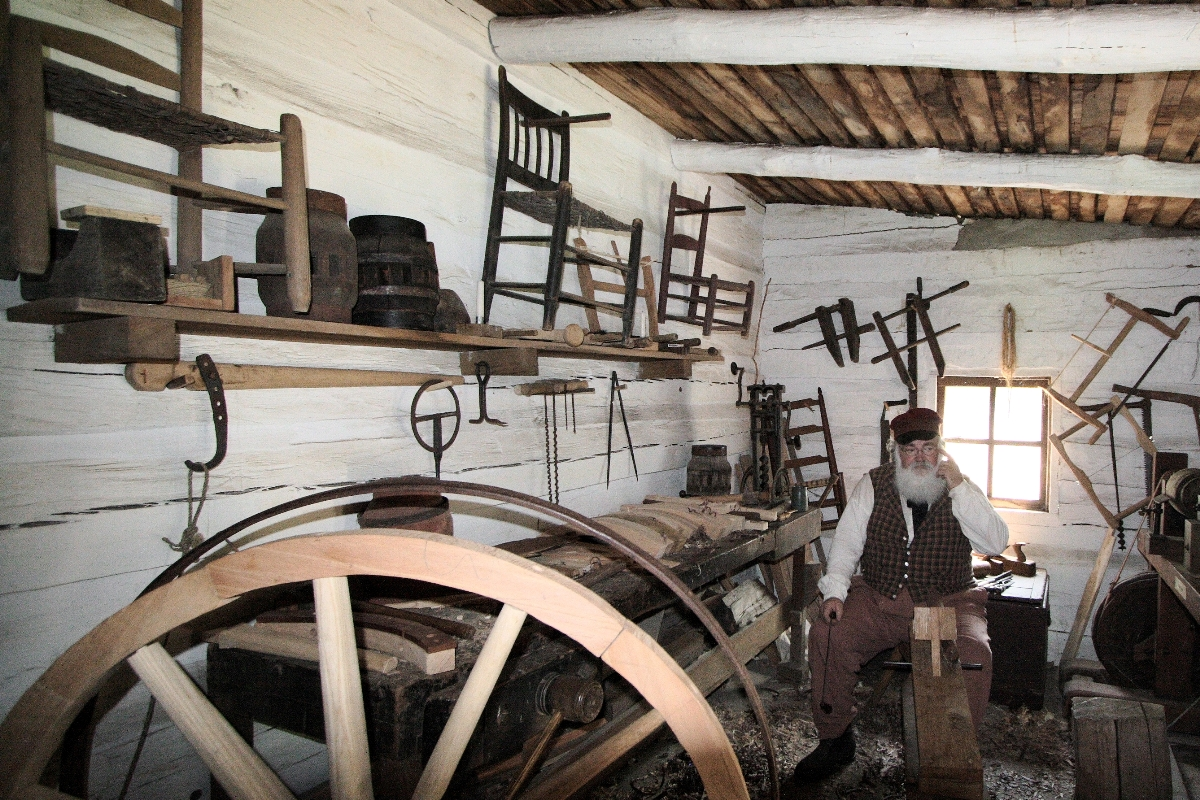
- Variant forms: Wehnert, Wahner, Weiner; Wegener, Wegner, Wägener, Wägner (Low German forms); Wagener, Wagner (High German forms), Wagenaar, Waagner; Stellmacher; Wagenmann (Wagemann), Wagenbreth, Wagenführ, Wagenführer, Wagenknecht, Wagschal (= German: Waagschale), Wagenseil, Fuhrmann; Rademacher; Woźnik, Woźniak, Woźnicki; Wagoner, Waggoner, Wainwright, Carter, Cartwright, Wheelwright Similar formed surnames Waage, Wagenbach, Wagenhals (Waghals, "daredevil"), Wagenitz (Wagnitz)

Wehner is a surname. Notable people with the surname include:

- Alejandro Wehner, Argentine film director
- David Wehner, CFO of Facebook
- Herbert Wehner (1906–1990), German politician; served in the Bundestag 1949–83
- John Wehner (born 1967), American professional baseball player and sports broadcaster
- Josef Magnus Wehner (1891–1973), German author and playwright
- Joseph Frank Wehner (1895–1918), American fighter pilot in World War I
- Oliver Wehner (born 1984), German politician
- Paul Wehner (1896–1982), German sports shooter
- Peter Wehner (born 1961), American political writer
- Shane Wehner (born 1974), Australian world-ranked professional surfer
- Stephanie Wehner (born 1977), German physicist and computer scientist
