= Violet Wegner =

Actress

- Comtesse Brunetta d'Usseaux
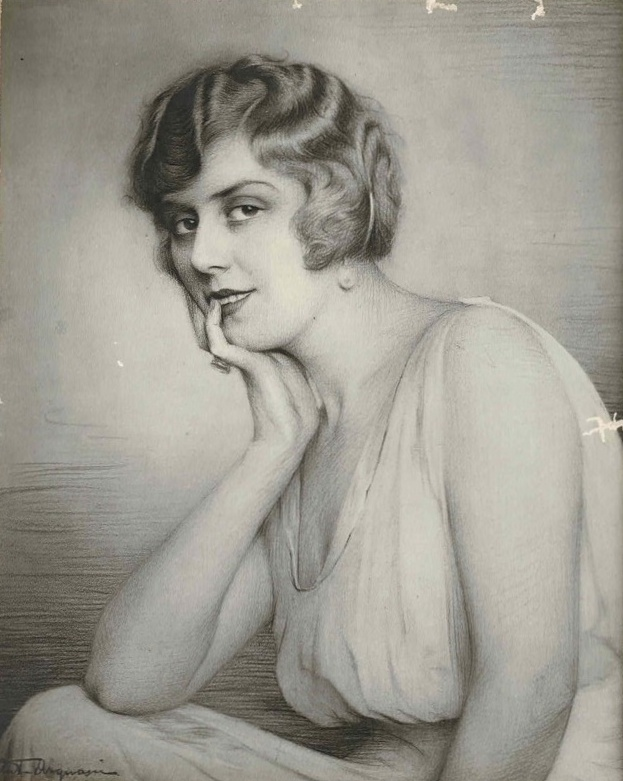
- Born: 1887
- Died: 17 October 1960 (aged 72–73)
- Spouse: Comte Sergio Francesco Enrico Maria Brunetta d'Usseaux (m. 1912; died 1919) Prince Peter of Montenegro (m. 1924; died 1932)
- House: Petrović-Njegoš (by marriage); Brunetta d'Usseaux (by marriage)
- Father: William Theodore Wegner
- Mother: Arabella Eliza Darby

Violet Emily Wegner, Countess Brunetta d'Usseaux, Princess Ljubica of Montenegro (1887 – 17 October 1960), was a British singer who made a career in the music halls from the age of 15 and became known as the "Idol of Berlin". By virtue of her second marriage, she was member of the deposed House of Petrović-Njegoš, former royal family of the Kingdom of Montenegro.

== Life ==
She was the daughter of an Extradition Department detective of Scotland Yard, William Theodore Wegner (b. 1857 in Saint Petersburg, Russian Empire), and his wife, Arabella Eliza Darby (1859-1939), who lived in the Tulse Hill district of South London.

In 1912, Violet married her first husband, Comte Sergio Francesco Enrico Maria Brunetta d'Usseaux (born 3 March 1885, Torino, Italy), in London. Sergio's parents were Comte Eugenio Brunetta d'Usseaux and his wife, Ekaterina Alexandrovna Zeyffart (1859-1897), a rich Russian noblewoman of German and Ukrainian ataman descent. Eugenio was Secretary General of the Olympic Committee that administered the 1908 London Olympics. He died in 1919 under mysterious circumstances. The fate of Serge is also unknown, although it is suggested he may have been trying to research the circumstances of his father's death following the October Revolution.

Violet enjoyed some success as a music hall artist and was seen in many productions across England and the European continent. Whilst travelling in Italy during 1918, Violet met Prince Peter of Montenegro, the youngest son of the exiled King Nicholas I of Montenegro and his wife, Queen Milena. Violet was chaperoned by her mother, Arabella, who advised them to delay the marriage until the new Yugoslav government awarded the money claimed by the prince for the confiscation of his family's property in Montenegro; she feared Violet being a commoner would count against Prince Peter's case. Violet married Peter in Paris in April 1924, before any settlement was made. After her marriage Violet converted to Orthodox faith and became HRH Princess Ljubica of Montenegro and thus sister-in-law to Queen Elena of Italy, as well as a host of other European princes and kings via her husband's siblings.

Violet and Peter continued to live on the continent, particularly at Monte Carlo where they were regular visitors to the Casino. Once married, Violet gave up her performing career. Violet did not forget her former profession and those who 'trod the boards,' however: the only wreath to be sent by a member of any royal family to the funeral of the celebrated Lillie Langtry in Jersey on 23 February 1929 was sent by the Prince Peter and Princess Ljubica of Montenegro. Prince Peter died in 1932 at a sanatorium in Merano, Italy, aged 42.
