= Cartwright =

Cartwright may refer to:

- Cartwright (occupation), a tradesperson skilled in the making and repairing of carts or wagons
- Cartwright (surname), including the list of people

== Places ==
=== Australia ===
- Cartwright, New South Wales

=== Canada ===
- Cartwright, Manitoba
- Cartwright, Newfoundland and Labrador
  - Cartwright Airport
- Cartwright High School in Blackstock, Ontario
- Cartwright Point, Ontario
- Cartwright Sound, British Columbia

=== United States ===
- Cartwright, North Dakota
- Cartwright, Oklahoma
- Cartwright, Texas
- Cartwright Township, Sangamon County, Illinois

== Other uses ==
- Cartwright Carmichael, basketball player
- Cartwright Inquiry, an investigation into medical malpractice in New Zealand
- Yt antigen system, also known as Cartwright

== See also ==
- Wainwright (disambiguation)
- Wheelwright (disambiguation)
- Wright (disambiguation)
