= Wagenaar =

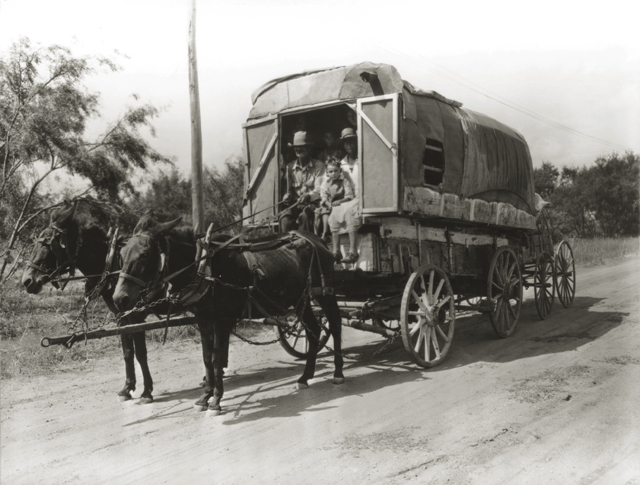
- Language: Dutch

Origin
- Meaning: A maker or driver of wagons
- Region of origin: Netherlands

Other names
- Variant form: Carter, Cartwright, Charron (disambiguation), Vagner, Wagener, Wagner, Wagoner, Wainwright, Wegener (disambiguation), Wegner

Wagenaar is a Dutch occupational surname meaning "wagoner" or "wagon builder" (cartwright). Variant forms are De Wagenaar, Wagenaars, Wag(h)enaer (archaic), and Wagener. The name is shared by the following people:

- Aad Wagenaar (1939–2021), Dutch journalist
- Aad Wagenaar (born 1940), Dutch Reformed Protestant politician
- Alexander Wagenaar (born 1955), American epidemiologist
- Bernard Wagenaar (1894–1971), Dutch-born American composer, pupil but not family of Johan Wagenaar
- Diderik Wagenaar (born 1946), Dutch composer and musical theorist, second cousin of Johan Wagenaar
- Gerben Wagenaar (1912–1993), Dutch Communist Party politician
- Jan Wagenaar (water polo) (born 1965), Dutch water polo player
- Jan Wagenaar (1709–1773), Dutch historian
- Jan Wagenaar (1937–2022), Dutch harness racing driver
- Jelle Wagenaar (born 1989), Dutch football defender
- Johan Wagenaar (1862–1941), Dutch composer and organist
- Josh Wagenaar (born 1985), Canadian football goalkeeper
- Lucas Janszoon Waghenaer (1533/34–1606), Dutch sailor and cartographer
- Rene Wagenaar (1954 -2007), Dutch Professor of Information and Communication Technology
- Willem Albert Wagenaar (1941–2011), Dutch psychologist
- Zacharias Wagenaer (1614–1668), German-born Dutch merchant, illustrator and Governor of the Cape Colony
