= Wheelwright (disambiguation) =

A wheelwright is a person who builds or repairs wheels.

Wheelwright may also refer to:

== Places ==
- Wheelwright, Kentucky, a city in Floyd County, Kentucky, USA
- Wheelwright, Massachusetts, a village in the Town of Hardwick, Worcester County, Massachusetts, USA
- Wheelwright, a city in General López Department, Santa Fe Province, Argentina

== Other uses ==
- Wheelwright (surname)
- Piast the Wheelwright, legendary figure who founded the Piast dynasty of Poland
- Wheelwright Hall, a dormitory at Phillips Exeter Academy named for John Wheelwright

== See also ==
- Worshipful Company of Wheelwrights, one of the Livery Companies of the City of London, England
- Wheelwright Museum of the American Indian, Santa Fe, New Mexico, USA
- Wainwright (disambiguation)
- Cartwright (disambiguation)
- Wright (disambiguation)
