= Viener =

Viener is a surname. Notable people with the surname include:

- John Viener (born 1972), American actor, comedian, and writer
- Adam Viener (born 1969), Entrepreneur, founder of Cyberia Communications, Imwave, and Yazing.
- Harry Viener (1868–1947), English military chaplain

== See also ==
- Vener
- Viner
