= Wehnert =

Wehnert is a surname. Notable people with the surname include:

- Bertha Wehnert-Beckmann (1815–1901), German photographer
- E. H. Wehnert (1813–1868), English painter
- Herbert Wehnert (born 1947), West German handball player

== See also ==
- Wehner
- Weinert
