= Prince Peter of Montenegro =

Prince of Montenegro

Prince Peter
- Grand Duke of Zahumlje
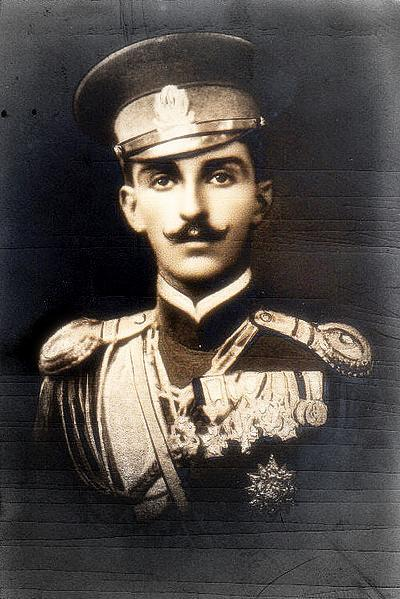
- Born: 10 October 1889; Cetinje, Montenegro
- Died: 7 May 1932 (aged 42); Merano, Italy
- Spouse: Violet Wegner (m. 1924)
- House: Petrović-Njegoš
- Father: Nicholas I of Montenegro
- Mother: Milena of Montenegro

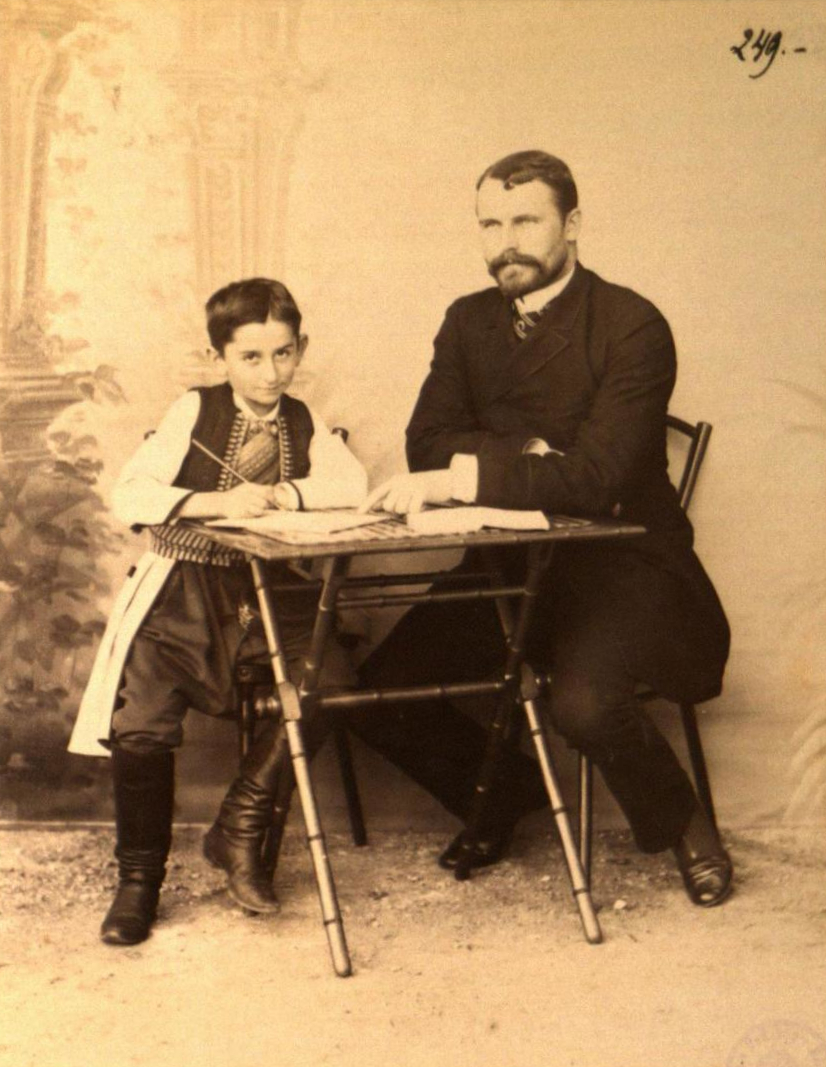
Prince Peter with this tutor Charles Piguet (ca. 1900)

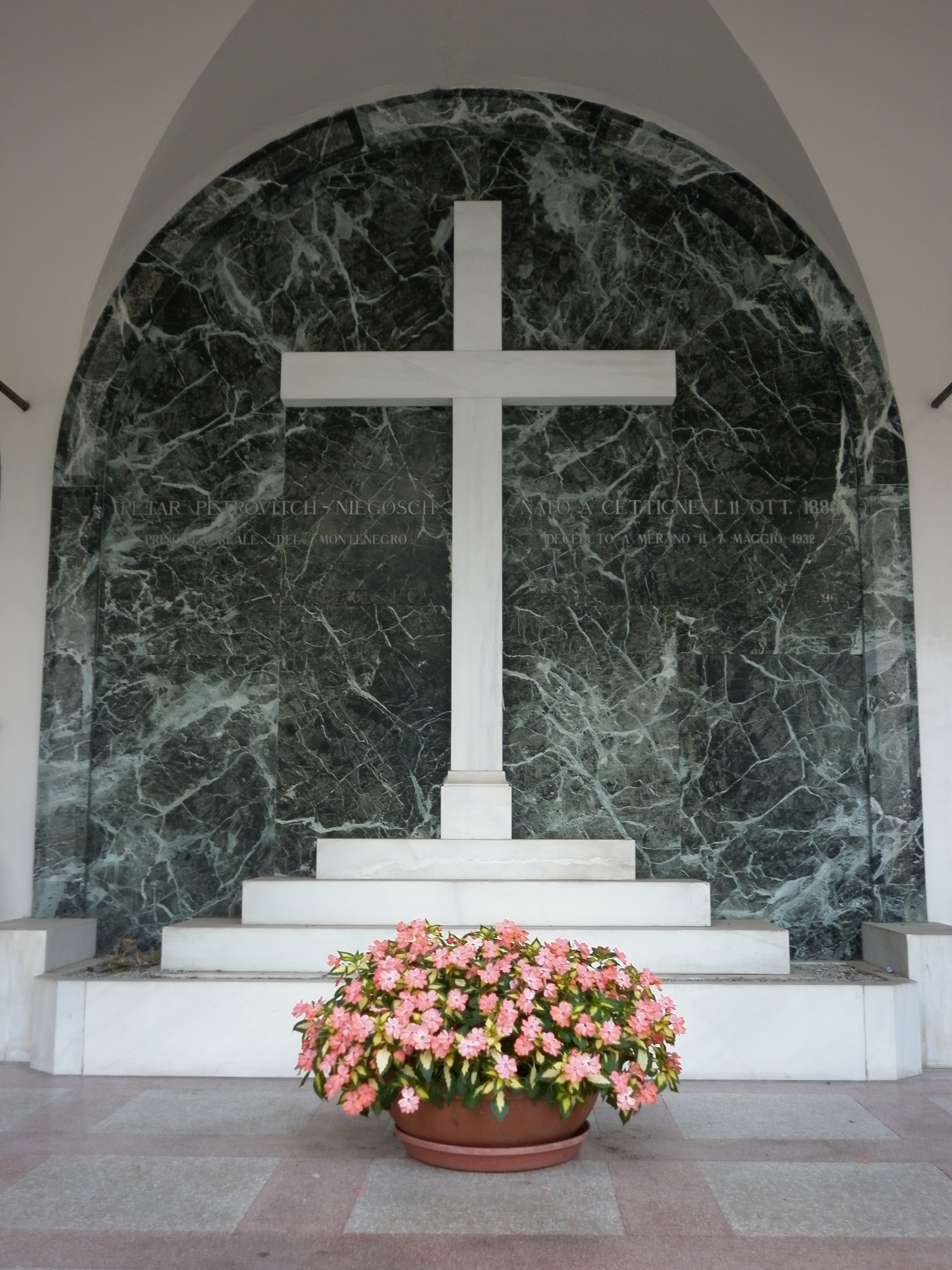
Grave of Prince Peter of Montenegro in Merano, Italy

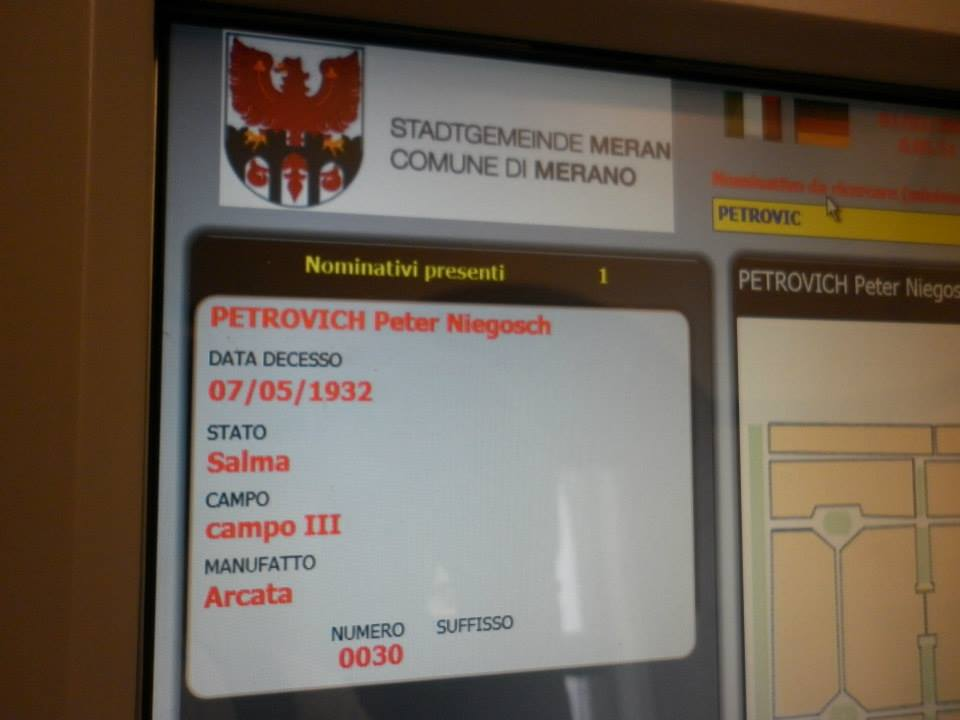
Merano, Italy

Prince Peter Petrovich-Njegosh of Montenegro, Grand Duke of Zahumlje (10 October 1889 – 7 May 1932) was a soldier in the Balkan Wars and the First World War, and a member of the Royal Family of Montenegro.

== Early life ==
Prince Peter was born on 10 October 1889 in Cetinje, the third son and youngest child of Prince Nicholas I of Montenegro and his consort, Milena of Montenegro. He was baptised on 19 January 1890 in Rijeka Crnojevića, his sponsors were Emperor Alexander III of Russia and the Duchess of Edinburgh. He was educated in Heidelberg.

Prince Peter who served in the Montenegrin Ground Army, had been hoping for a war since the Austro-Hungarian annexation of Bosnia and Herzegovina in 1908, writing to his nephew Crown Prince George of Serbia at the time, he stated his wish that they would meet on the "Crimson field". It would be another four years before the outbreak of the First Balkan War (1912–1913) meant he finally saw action. Prince Peter symbolically began the conflict firing the first shot at the Turkish forces.

As the youngest son of the king and thus unlikely to inherit to the Montenegrin throne, Prince Peter was talked about as a candidate for the throne of Albania after that country achieved independence from the Ottoman Empire in 1912. However nothing ever came of it and in the end the throne was given to the German prince William of Wied.

== First World War ==
Prince Peter saw more action during the First World War. In late August 1914 during the first month of the war, Prince Peter was in command of the defence of Lovćen when it was attacked by the Austrians. With the help of an Anglo-French Naval Fleet he managed to lead a successful counterattack and his army managed to kill and capture many Austrian soldiers and artillery guns. By March 1915 his army had progressed into Austrian territory holding a 30-mile stretch from Spizza to a southern fortress in the Bay of Cattaro.

In May 1915 a highly controversial meeting took place at Budva between Prince Peter and the Austrian Colonel Hupka, former military attaché at Cetinje. All that Prince Peter would acknowledge took place at the meeting was a request from him for the Austrians to stop the bombardment of towns by their aeroplanes, and that he was acting on instruction from his father. However a number of arrangements also took place, these included supplying the Austrians with Serbian national sandals, so that they climb the rocks more easily; and giving a verbal, then written order to his two brigadiers that they must not resist the Austrians and allow them to capture Lovćen.

After Prince Peter's surrender of Lovćen by 1916 the war had turned against Montenegro in favour of the numerically superior Austrians. In January of that year along with his parents Prince Peter left Montenegro heading first to Rome and then France where they joined the rest of the Royal Family, all except for his brother Prince Mirko of Montenegro who was left behind to organise the defence of the country.

== Exile and marriage ==
In the Autumn of 1918 while still in exile in France, Prince Peter met a married woman, Countess Violet Brunetta d'Usseaux (née Violet Emily Wegner), whose husband, an Italian nobleman, Count Sergio Brunetta d'Usseaux was in the service of his father, King Nicholas I of Montenegro. Having fallen in love and wishing to marry her, Prince Peter wrote to his father instructing him to arrange the marriage. When his father objected, Prince Peter tried to blackmail his father, threatening to reveal damaging secrets about the surrender of Lovćen. In any case, Prince Peter's father died in 1921. With the end of the First World War, Prince Peter and the Montenegrin Royal Family were exiled and denied the chance to return to their kingdom when the Podgorica Assembly chose to unite Montenegro with the other Slavic lands as part of the Kingdom of Yugoslavia.

It was reputedly at the bedside of a dying friend, that Prince Peter met the London-born music hall performer Violet Emily Wegner, wife of Count Sergio Brunetta d'Usseaux and daughter of William Theodore Wegner (b. 1857), an Extradition Department detective of Scotland Yard born in Saint Petersburg, Russia, and his English born wife, Arabella Eliza Darby (1859-1939). Violet had married Count Sergio Brunetta d'Usseaux in London in 1912. D'Usseaux was the son of Italian Count Eugenio Brunetta d'Usseaux who had been the Secretary General of the Olympic Committee responsible for reviving the games and administering the 1908 London Olympic Games. Eugenio died in mysterious circumstances in 1919 and his body was never received at the place of its intended burial. Eugenio had been seeking news of a son missing in Russia after the October Revolution which may have been his son Sergio. There is no confirmed information about Sergio's death. Prince Peter's proposal of marriage to Violet was accepted which suggests Violet's previous marriage was ended, probably by the death of Sergio. Violet's mother, it is said, persuaded the couple to delay marriage as Prince Peter had a claim of compensation against the Yugoslav government, (estimated at £6million for the confiscation of the Royal Family's property in Montenegro). Violet's mother feared that if Prince Peter married her daughter, a commoner, it could jeopardise his claim. It is asserted she advised him to collect the money before he wed her daughter. After a number of years of failed attempts to secure the money, Prince Peter attempted to strike a deal with the Yugoslav government whereby he would drop his claim to £6million for a lower £2million. After going to Belgrade and signing paperwork he was told by the government that having agreed to accept £2million, the sum would still not be remitted to him until a later date. Prince Peter nevertheless married Violet in Paris on 29 April 1924 before having received any pay out. After the marriage Prince Peter's wife became HRH Princess Ljubica of Montenegro.

== Death ==
In 1932, Prince Peter died in Merano, Italy, at the age of 42. His wife, Princess (Violet) Ljubica of Montenegro died in Monte Carlo on 17 October 1960. They had no children.
