= Michael Wainwright =

Michael Wainwright may refer to:

- Michael Wainwright (rugby league) (born 1980), English rugby league player
- Mike Wainwright (born 1975), Scotland international rugby league player
- Michael Wainwright (musician) (born 1973), Canadian singer-songwriter
- Michael Wainwright (racing driver) (born 1973), British racing driver and businessman
