= Peter Schuttler =

American wainwright

Peter Schuttler (1812-1865) has often been referred to as the "Great Chicago Wagon King" in Midwestern U.S. lore.

== Biography ==
Peter Schuttler was born in Wachenheim, Germany on December 22, 1812. He emigrated from Germany to the U.S. in 1834, when he was 22. After working as a wainwright in Sandusky, Ohio, he moved to Chicago in 1843. He established a wagon shop there and took advantage of the growing demand for durable, versatile vehicles with the rise in westward migration after the Great California Gold Rush of 1849. Schuttler wagons were also used as part of the famous Mormon trek to the Salt Lake, Utah region in 1855, led by Brigham Young.

By the mid-1850s, Schuttler was one of the leading wagon makers in the United States. His factory employed about 100 people and produced about 1,800 wagons per year, which sold for about $75. Although he was not a major military contractor during the Civil War, civilian demand allowed Schuttler's business to prosper.

In 1863, he was one of only three Chicago, IL residents to pay taxes on an income of over $100,000 (Potter Palmer and John V. Farwell being the others). The house Schuttler built, on the city block bordered by Aberdeen, Adams, Morgan, and Monroe Street in Chicago, was long considered the finest in Chicago. Built by J. M. Van Osdel over the span of three years, it contained many artifacts and handcrafted building components from Germany, Schuttler's birthplace. Its risk cost was reportedly almost $500,000, a considerable sum in the mid-19th century. It was razed in 1911.

Schuttler died in Chicago on January 16, 1865, and was buried at Rosehill Cemetery.

His son Peter Schuttler II took over the business, which continued to manufacture a large number of high quality wagons. By 1880, about 300 workers produced over $400,000 of wagons per year.

Peter II was married to Wilhelmina (Minnie) Anheuser, daughter of Eberhard Anheuser. It was Mrs. Wilhelmina Anheuser Schuttler's sister, Lilly Anheuser, who married Adolphus Busch. Today, their direct descendants are top executives at Anheuser Busch, America's largest brewing company.

As late as 1910, when Peter Schuttler III was chief executive of the company, Schuttler & Hotz Manufacturers continued to employ about 300 men at its factory on 22nd Street in Chicago. But the advent of the automobile meant the end of an era for the Schuttler wagon works, which ceased operations by the mid-1920s.

== Sources ==
- Carbutt, John; et al. (1868). Biographical sketches of the leading men of Chicago. Chicago:Wilson & St. Clair. pp. 245–250. "peter schuttler wagon."
- Cope, George W. (1900). The Iron and Steel Interests of Chicago. Rand McNally. pp. 55–56.
