= Petar Petrović-Njegoš =

Petar Petrović-Njegoš (Cyrillic: Петар Петровић-Његош) may refer to:

- Petar I Petrović-Njegoš (1748–1830), Prince-Bishop of Montenegro, Exarch of the Serbian Orthodox Church
- Petar II Petrović-Njegoš (1813–1851), Prince-Bishop of Montenegro, poet and philosopher
- Petar III Petrović-Njegoš (1889–1932), Prince Peter of Montenegro, son of Nicholas I
