= Charles Piguet =

Swiss diplomat

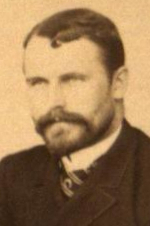
- Piguet, circa 1900
- Born: 17 April 1859; Geneva, Canton of Geneva, Switzerland
- Died: 24 September 1918 (aged 59); Eaux-Vives, Canton of Geneva, Switzerland
- Occupation: Tutor
- Known for: Tutor to sons of Nicholas I of Montenegro

Charles E. Piguet (17 April 1859 – 24 September 1918) was a Swiss tutor. He tutored the sons of Nicholas I of Montenegro and served as the honorary consul of the Kingdom of Montenegro in Switzerland until 1918.

== Life ==
Piguet was born in Geneva in 1859. He studied medicine.

From 1881 to 1901, Piguet lived in the Montenegrin capital of Cetinje. Here, he tutored the sons of Nicholas I of Montenegro, Princes Danilo, Mirko and Peter.

In 1916, Montenegro established a consular mission in Geneva, and Piguet was considered for the position of honorary consul. He held the position until his death, after which it became vacant. He was the sole consul of Montenegro in Switzerland, since the kingdom was absorbed into the new Kingdom of Serbs, Croats and Slovenes shortly after his death.

Piguet also worked as a translator and translated Gordana by the Serbian writer Laza Kostić into French.

== Honors ==
In 1893, Piguet became an Officer of the French Legion of Honour. He was awarded the Order of the Crown of Italy, Commander class in 1894.

== Mentions ==
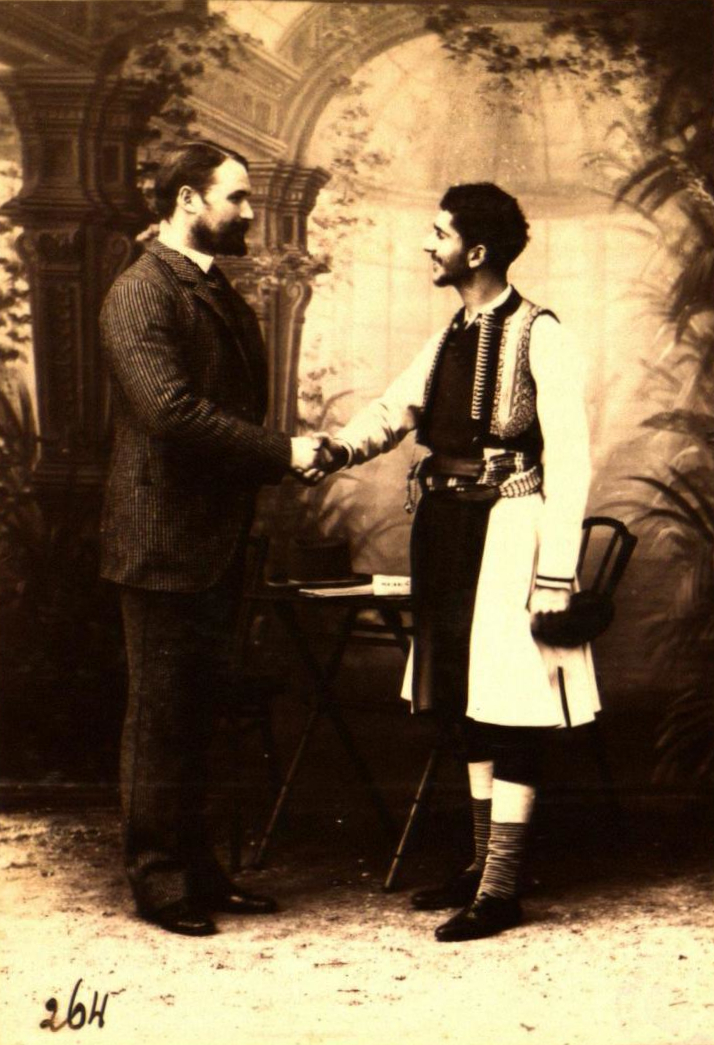
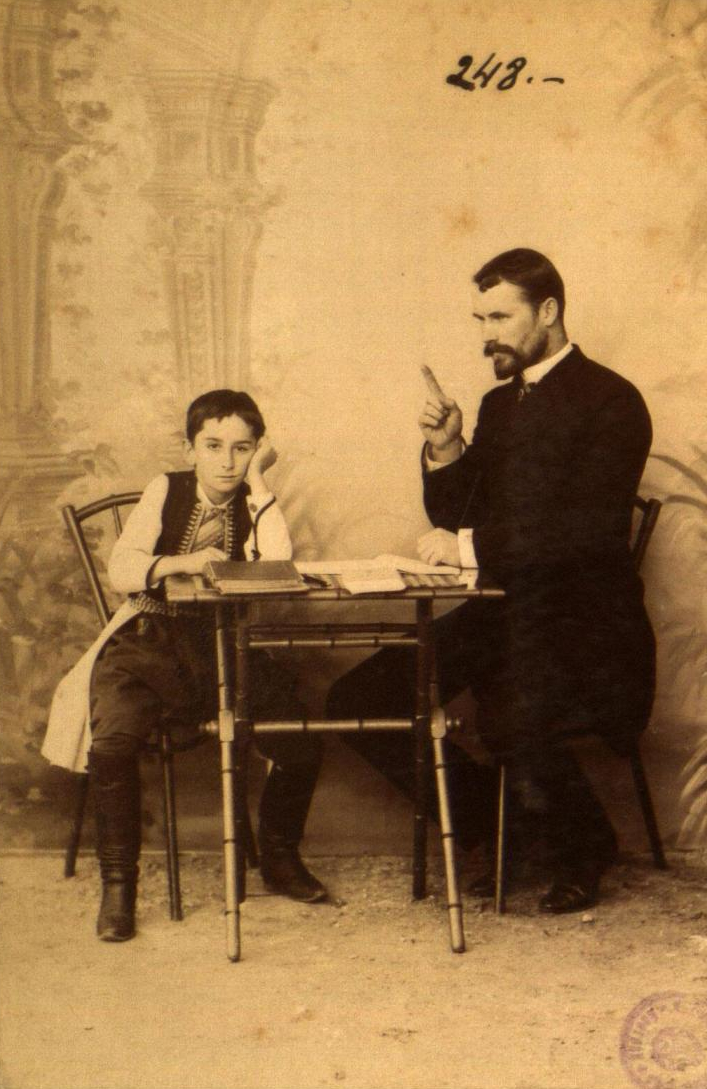
Piguet with Prince Mirko (left) and Peter (right)

Piguet was mentioned in several travelogues by authors who visited Cetinje.

In her Twenty Years Of Balkan Tangle, Edith Durham recalls Piguet as a "truly tactful man" who would often defuse heated altercations between the Foreign Ministers Plenipotentiary. Henrik Angell describes him in Gjennem Montenegro paa Ski as a "diligent man, working all day despite the cold", as well as a "huge, handsome fellow, naturalized Montenegrin".

In his memoir Bilješke jednog pisca, Simo Matavulj writes of his friendship with Piguet, who he says had a "poetic soul and extensive literary education". He describes Piguet as a "mystic and convinced spiritist", which he preached with "proselytizing zeal".

The Swiss painter William Ritter also mentions Piguet in his travelogue.

== Works ==
- Le Monténégro, 1905
