= Wainwright =

Wainwright may refer to:

- Wainwright (occupation), a tradesperson skilled in the making and repairing of carts or wagons
- Wainwright (surname), including the list of people

== Places ==
=== Canada ===
- Wainwright, Alberta, a town in Alberta
  - Wainwright (provincial electoral district), former Alberta electoral district
  - CFB Wainwright, Canadian Forces Base
  - Municipal District of Wainwright No. 61, a municipal district in Alberta

=== United States ===
- Wainwright, Alabama
- Wainwright, Alaska
- Fort Wainwright, United States Army base located near Fairbanks, Alaska
- Wainwright, Missouri
- Wainwright, Jackson County, Ohio
- Wainwright, Tuscarawas County, Ohio
- Wainwright, Oklahoma

== Other uses ==
- Wainwright (hill), one of 214 fells (hills and mountains) described in A. Wainwright's Pictorial Guide to the Lakeland Fells
- USC&GS Wainwright (1942) a survey ship in commission in the United States Coast and Geodetic Survey from 1942 to 1967
- USS Wainwright, name of three United States Navy ships
- Wainwright Building, landmark office building in St. Louis, Missouri
- Wainwright v. Sykes, 1977 United States Supreme Court case

== See also ==
- Justice Wainwright (disambiguation)
