= Vener =

Vener is both a given name and a surname. Notable people with the name include:

- Vener Galiev (born 1975), Russian wrestler and mixed martial artist
- Mario Véner (born 1964), Argentine-Chilean football player

== See also ==
- Vänern, the largest lake in Sweden
- Wehner
