= Tyring platform =

Work surface for wheels

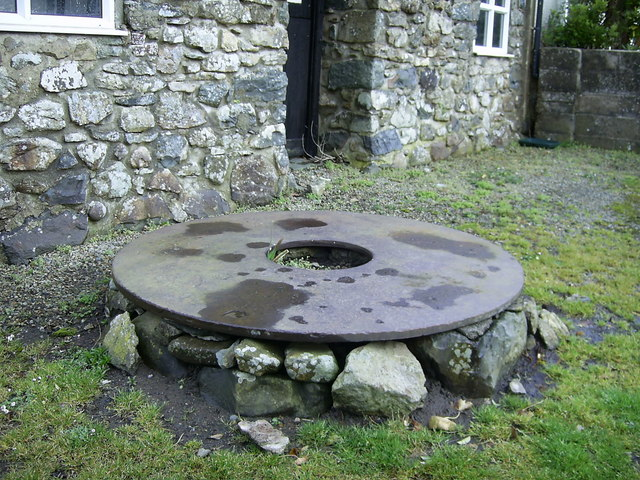
A tyring platform in St Nicholas in Pembrokeshire

A tyring platform or tyring plate is a circular metal or stone table used for the fitting of a metal tyre or rim to a wooden wheel. These were commonplace when such wheels were needed for the numerous carts, carriages and wagons used throughout society and were standard equipment for a wheelwright.

The tyre or rim would be heated to a high temperature to make it expand for the fitting. The plate was then needed to support the hot metal and the wheel. The heat would typically cause the wooden wheel to catch fire and so water would be used to douse it. The need for a bonfire or furnace to heat the tyres made it efficient to fit several tyres at the same time in a batch and so a strong and stable platform would facilitate this. The platforms would therefore be made of material such as stone or iron. They would typically be circular and large enough to hold the biggest wheels with a hole or rod to secure and locate the hub of the wheel.

== Gallery ==
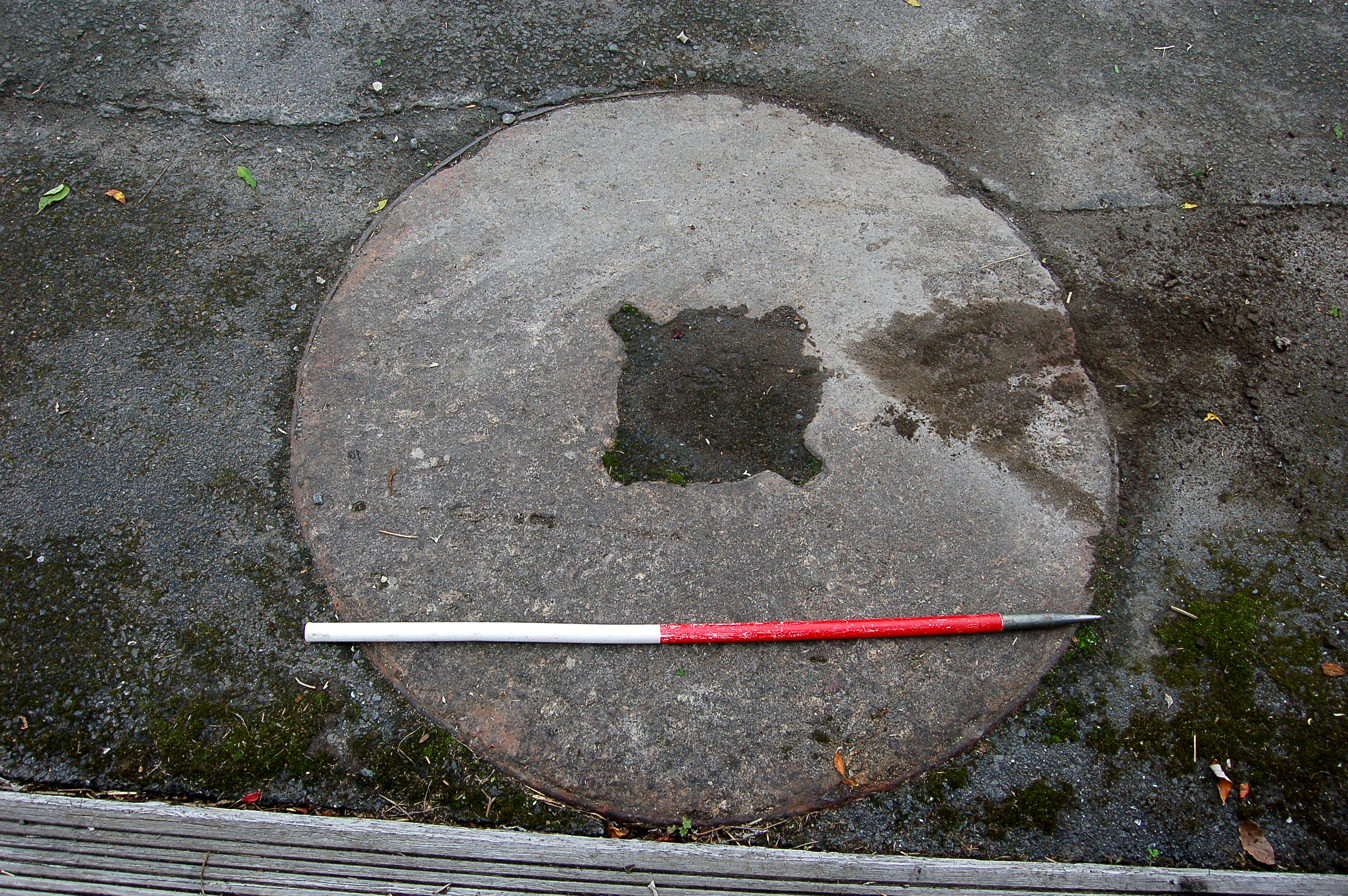
A "binding stone" in County Kilkenny, Ireland. In Ireland, the terms "binding stone", "banding stone" and "shoeing stone" are more common.

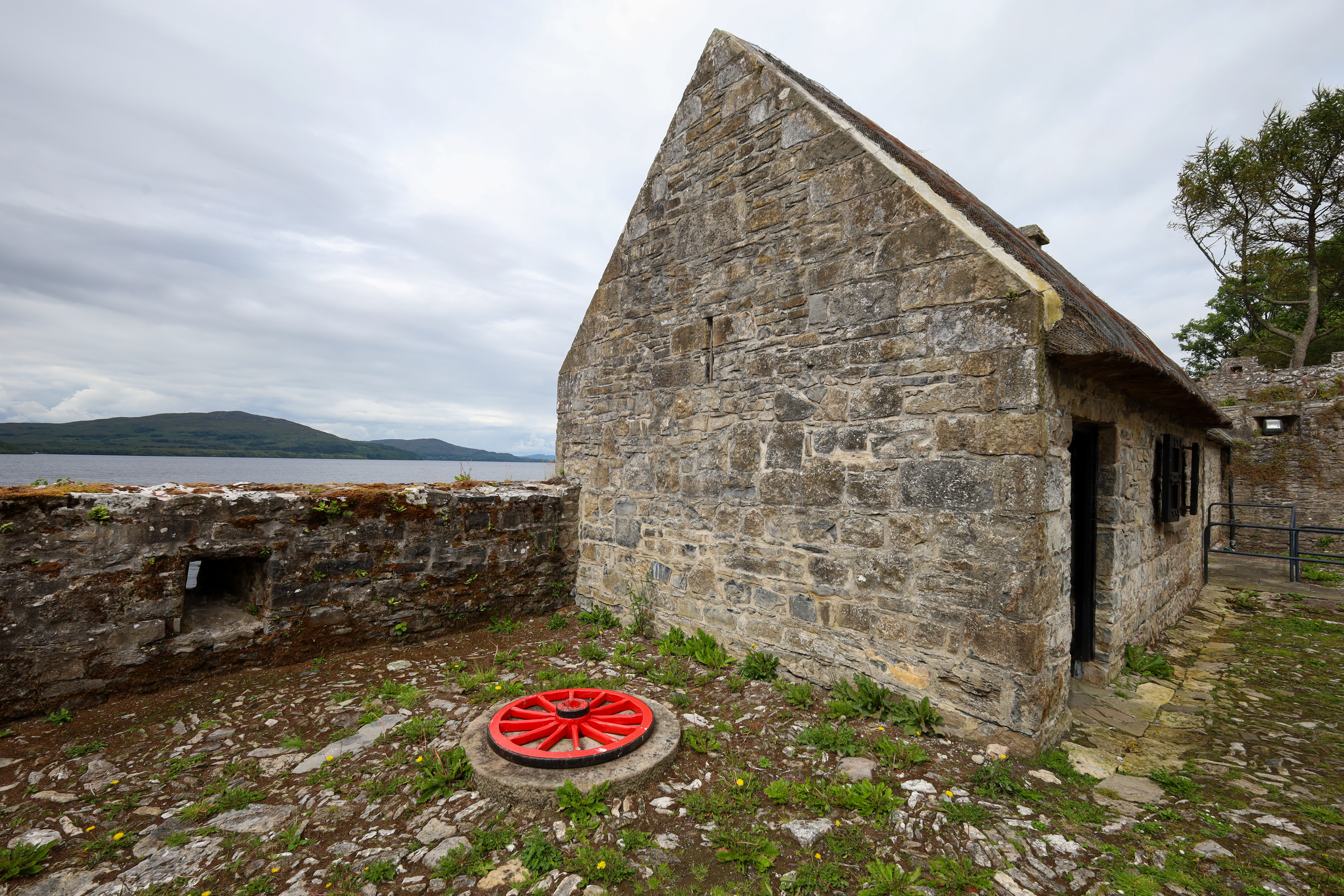
Binding stone at Parke's Castle in Co. Leitrim, Ireland with a red cart wheel placed on top

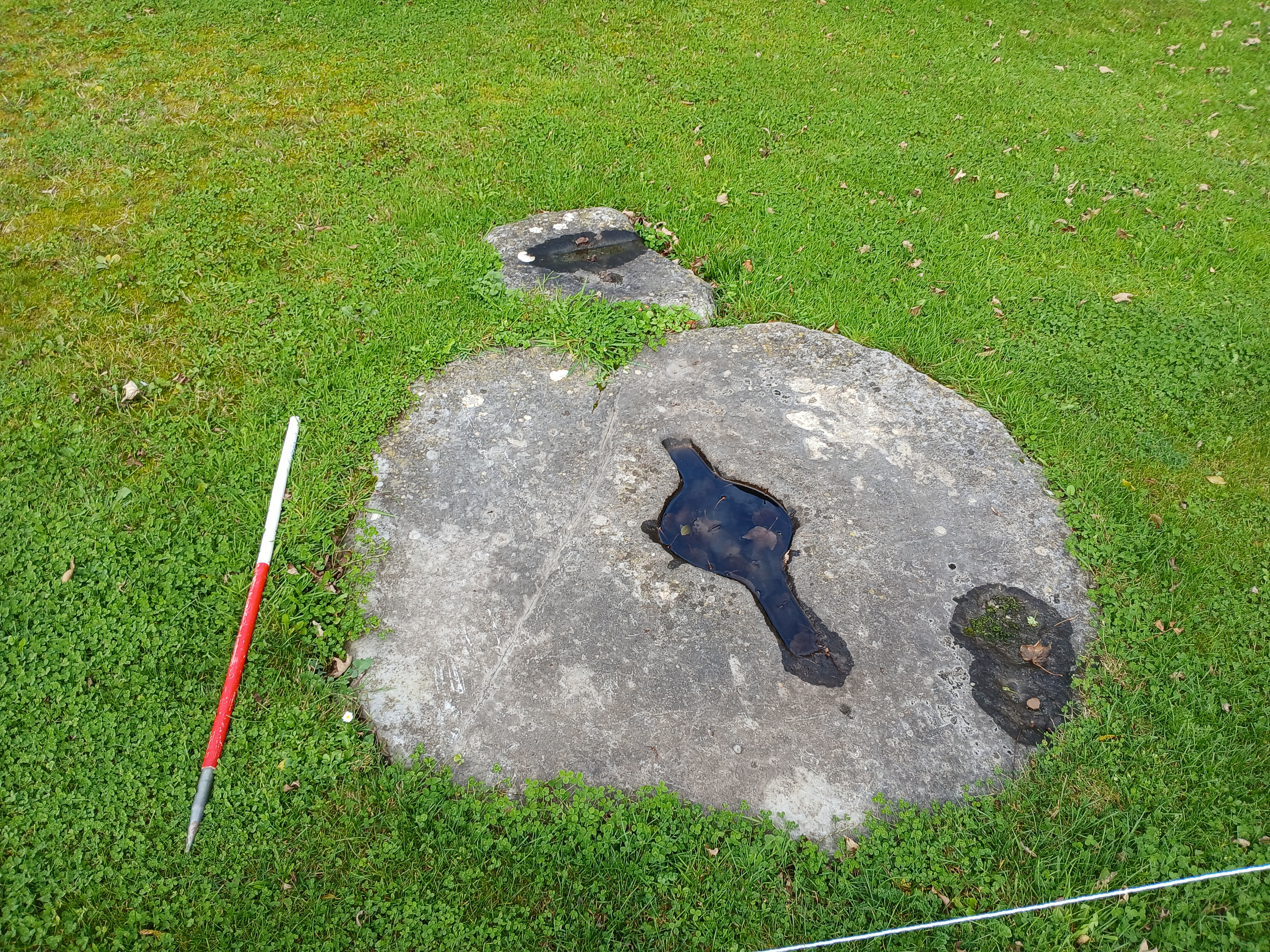
A binding stone at Fennelly's Forge in County Kilkenny
