= Weinert =

Weinert is a surname. Notable people with the surname include:

- Erich Weinert (1890–1953), German writer
- Jimmy Weinert (born 1951), American motocross and supercross rider
- Lefty Weinert (1900–1973), American baseball player
- Paul H. Weinert (1869–1919), American soldier
- Rudolph A. Weinert (c. 1885–1974), American politician
- Yuri Veinert (1914-1951), Soviet political prisoner and poet, co-creator of the fictional poet Guillaume du Vintrais

== See also ==
- Weinert Center in Madison, Wisconsin, United States
