= Wainwright (surname) =

Origin
- Origin: England
- Meaning: "wagon builder"
- Region of origin: England

Other names
- Variant forms: Wainewright, Wainright, Waynewright, Wainwrigt and Winwright.

Wainwright is an Anglo-Saxon occupational surname derived from the pre-7th century Old English word waegnwyrhta. The prefix, "waeg(e)n/waen, refers to a vehicle/wagon, common in its time as being horse-driven and four-wheeled. The suffix, wyrhta/wright, refers to a maker/builder. The earliest public record of the name dates to 1237 in Essex. Variations include Wainewright, Wainright, Waynewright, Wainwrigt and Winwright. Notable people with the surname include:

- Aaron Wainwright (born 1997), Welsh rugby union player.
- Adam Wainwright (born 1981), American baseball pitcher for the St. Louis Cardinals
- Alfred Wainwright (1907–1991), writer of guide books to the fells of the English Lake District, including List of Wainwrights
- Alfred Wainwright (cricketer) (1883–1971), South African cricketer
- Alisha Wainwright (born 1989), American actress
- Anthony Wainwright (born 1970), American convicted murderer
- Arthur Wainwright (1894–1968), English footballer
- Charles S. Wainwright (1826–1907), American artillery officer during the American Civil War
- Dennis Wainwright (1935–2024), Bermudian cricketer
- Edgar Thomas Wainwright (1868–?), Scottish sculptor
- Geoffrey Wainwright (1939–2020), British Methodist theologian
- George L. Wainwright, Jr. (born 1943), American judge, Associate Justice of the North Carolina Supreme Court
- Harriet Wainwright (1766–1843), British composer, singer, writer, and entrepreneur
- Harry Wainwright, locomotive, carriage and wagon superintendent of the South Eastern and Chatham Railway
- Helen Wainwright, American diver and freestyle swimmer
- Henry Wainwright (died 1875), English brushmaker and murderer
- Hilary Wainwright (born 1949), British socialist and feminist
- Ish Wainright (born 1994), American-Ugandan basketball player in the Israeli Basketball Premier League
- John Wainwright (author) (John William W.) (1921–1995) English crime novelist and author
- Jonathan Mayhew Wainwright (bishop) (1792–1854), English-American Episcopal bishop and father of Jonathan Mayhew Wainwright II
- Jonathan Mayhew Wainwright II (1821–1863), Lieutenant in the United States Navy, grandfather of Jonathan Mayhew Wainwright IV
- Jonathan Mayhew Wainwright IV (1883–1953), United States Army general during World War II
- Loudon Wainwright Jr. (1924–1988), American columnist and editor.
- Loudon Wainwright III (born 1946), American songwriter, folk singer, humorist, actor, father of Martha and Rufus Wainwright
- Louie L. Wainwright, Secretary of Florida Division of Corrections; respondent in Gideon v. Wainwright court cases
- Lyndon Wainwright (1919–2018), English ballroom and Latin exhibition dancer.
- Mark Wainwright, Australian academic
- Martha Wainwright (born 1976), Canadian-American singer-songwriter, daughter of Loudon Wainwright III
- Martin Wainwright (journalist), British journalist
- Martin Wainwright (statistician) (born 1973), statistician
- Michael Wainwright (musician), Canadian musician
- Richard Wainwright (politician) (1918–2003), British Liberal politician
- Richard Wainwright (Civil War naval officer) (1817–1862), United States Navy Commander, father of Admiral Richard Wainwright
- Richard Wainwright (Spanish-American War naval officer) (1849–1926), United States Navy Admiral, son of Commander Wainwright
- Richard Wainwright (World War I naval officer) (1881–1944), United States Navy Commander, son of Admiral Richard Wainwright
- Rob Wainwright (rugby union) (born 1965), rugby union player for Scotland and for the British Lions
- Rufus Wainwright (born 1973), Canadian-American singer-songwriter, son of Loudon Wainwright III
- Sally Wainwright (born 1963), English dramatist and television writer
- Ted Wainwright (1865–1919), English cricketer
- Thomas Wainwright (cricketer) (1940–2019), English cricketer
- Victor Wainwright (born 1981), American blues and boogie-woogie singer, songwriter, and pianist
- William Wainwright, British musician better known under his artist name William Orbit. Other aliases include Wayne Wright
- William Edward Wainwright (1873–1959), mine manager in Broken Hill, New South Wales, Australia
- William L. Wainwright (1947 – 2012), American politician, member of the North Carolina General Assembly

== See also ==
- Justice Wainwright (disambiguation)
