= Wagoner =

Wagoner may refer to:

== Places in the United States ==
- Wagoner, Arizona
- Wagoner, Indiana
- Wagoner, Oklahoma
- Wagoner County, Oklahoma
- Wagoner, West Virginia

== People ==
- A person who drives a wagon
- Wagoner (surname)

== Other uses ==
- Van Wagoner, American automobile, manufactured 1899–1903
- Wagoner Armory, Oklahoma
- Wagoner Doctrine, American legal principle
- Wagoner High School, Oklahoma
- Wagoner Inlet, Antarctica
- Wagoner Tribune, Oklahoma
- Teamster, or wagoner, formerly a billet title in the U. S. Army
