= Guillaume du Vintrais =

Fictional French poet

Guillaume du Vintrais

Guillaume du Vintrais (c.1553-c.1602) is a fictional 16th-century French poet created by Soviet writers Yuri Veinert and Yakov Kharon while they were imprisoned in a Gulag labor camp in the 1940s. Du Vintrais was described as "a sixteenth-century Gascon poet who was born in the twentieth-century Soviet Far East".

== Fictional biography ==
Du Vintrais was born around 1553 in Gascony, France. He was a contemporary of poets such as Agrippa d'Aubigne and Michel de Montaigne. As a young man, du Vintrais moved to Paris and became a court poet known for his satirical and politically provocative verses. In 1572, du Vintrais was imprisoned in the Bastille for his Huguenot beliefs during the St. Bartholomew's Day massacre, was sentenced to death, but then sent into an exile to England. He returned to France and joined the Henry IV's court. He died in 1602.

Du Vintrais' sonnets' themes express the poet's passions for freedom, justice, and romantic love. Nadezda Vashkevich noted the parallels between du Vintrais and the French humanist poet Clement Marot, who was imprisoned as a follower of Reformation.

== History ==
Guilleaume du Vintrais never existed. He was invented in the 1940s by Soviet writers Yuri Veinert and Yakov Kharon while they were imprisoned in the Svobodnoe GULAG labor camp in Siberia. Veinert, arrested in 1937 for a telegram (Note: "for a ‘“suspicious” telegram’ from two girlfriends that revealed his involvement in a very un-Soviet love triangle") in which a prosecutor found a call for revolt, was an amateur poet who began writing verses in exile. Kharon, a sound director arrested for unauthorized readings, was arrested in the same year as part of Stalin's purges of the Soviet intelligentsia. They became friends in the camp through a mutual love of poetry. The last name, "du Vintrais" (дю Вентре), is an anagram of Veinert's name (Вейнерт); the portrait is a Veinert's photo with a pencil-drawn moustache and a wig. The authors served their sentences and were released in 1947. At the time, they wrote around 40 sonnets. Both were arrested again in 1948 and sentenced to an indefinite exile. They continued to write sonnets, discussing them by mail. Veinert died in 1951 (possibly committing a suicide); Kharon was released in 1954.

Veinert and Kharon wrote the one hundred sonnets and crafted a biography for their fictional French poet. The two claimed they were merely translating du Vintrais' recently rediscovered work. The hundred sonnets were finally published in 1989, together with Kharon's "fake article", his recollections about the camps, and excerpts from Yuri Veinert's mother's memoirs. The poems were compiled into The Wicked Songs of Guilleaume du Vintrais, and existed in four handwritten copies. In 1965, Kharon composed a "fake article", titled "Prosaic Commentary on a Poetic Biography", and an autobiographic article.

The journalist Alexei Simonov—a friend of Kharon—edited the collection and dedicated several articles to it.

Nadezda Vashkevich notes that besides the Clement Marot's sonnets, the authors use Shakespearean sonnet structure, and echoed Alexander Pushkin's themes.

The sonnets are in Russian. They were translated to French in 2019 by Paul Lequesne and Yves Gauthier.
