= Wegener =

Wegener may refer to:

== Astronomy ==
- 29227 Wegener, a main-belt asteroid
- Wegener (lunar crater)
- Wegener (Martian crater)

== Places ==
- Wegener Range, an Antarctic mountain range
- Mount Wegener, an Antarctic mountain in the Read Mountains in the Shackleton Range
- Wegener Canyon, an undersea canyon
- Wegener Halvo Formation, a geologic formation in Greenland

== Businesses ==
- Wegener (company), a Dutch media conglomerate
- Alfred Wegener Institute for Polar and Marine Research

== Medicine ==
- Wegener's granulomatosis, now known as granulomatosis with polyangiitis

== People ==
- Alfred Wegener (1880–1930), German geologist who originated the theory of continental drift
- Kapitänleutnant Bernhard Wegener, commander of German submarine U-27, killed in one of the two Baralong incidents in 1915
- Bertha Frensel Wegener (1874–1953), Dutch composer and music educator
- Bobby Wegener, American lawyer and politician from Oklahoma
- Manuela (singer) (1943–2001), German singer Doris Inge Wegener
- Einar Mogens Wegener (1882–1931), birth name of transsexual pioneer Lili Elbe
- Emmy Wegener (1901–1973), Dutch violinist, pianist, poet and composer
- Frederico or Federico Wegener, aliases of Eduard Roschmann (1908–1977), Nazi SS officer known as the "Butcher of Riga"
- Friedrich Wegener (1907–1990), Nazi German pathologist
- Gerda Wegener (1886–1940), Danish illustrator
- Ingo Wegener (1950–2008), German computer scientist
- Kurt Wegener (1878–1964), German polar explorer and meteorologist, brother of Alfred
- Mike Wegener (born 1946), American baseball pitcher
- Myrton O. Wegener (1917–1991), American farmer, businessman, and politician
- Otto Wegener (1849–1924), French portrait photographer
- Otto Wegener (1881–1938), Danish sports shooter
- Paul Wegener (1874–1948), German actor and film director
- Paul Wegener (Nazi) (1908–1993), German Nazi Party official
- Stephen T. Wegener (born 1952), American psychologist
- Ulrich Wegener (1929–2017), German police officer
- Wilhelm Wegener (1895–1944), German World War II general
- Wolfgang Wegener (1875–1956), German admiral and naval historian

== See also ==
- Wegner
