= Seyffarth =

Seyffarth is a surname. Notable people with the surname include:

- Mrs Seyffarth (1798-1843), married name of Louisa Sharpe, artist
- Åke Seyffarth (1919–1998), Swedish speed skater
- Gustav Seyffarth (1796–1885), German-American Egyptologist
- Jan Seyffarth (born 1986), German racing driver
