= Wheelwright =

Person who builds or repairs wooden wheels

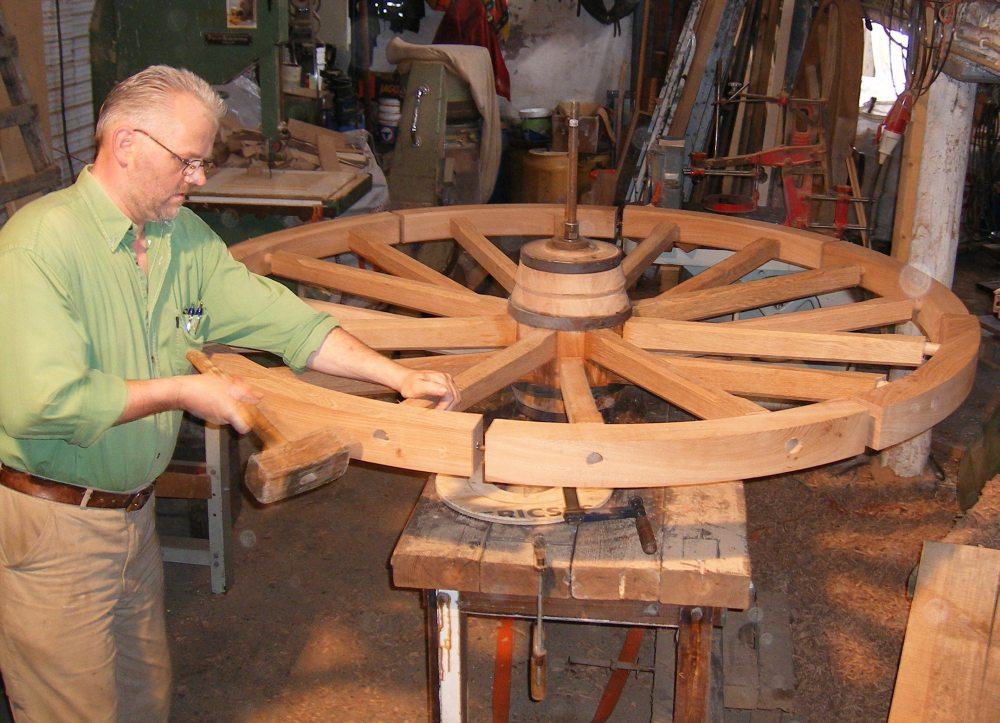
- A wheelwright taps felloes onto spoke ends

Occupation
- Activity sectors: Trades

Description
- Related jobs: Carriagemaker; Coachbuilder; Blacksmith; Carpenter

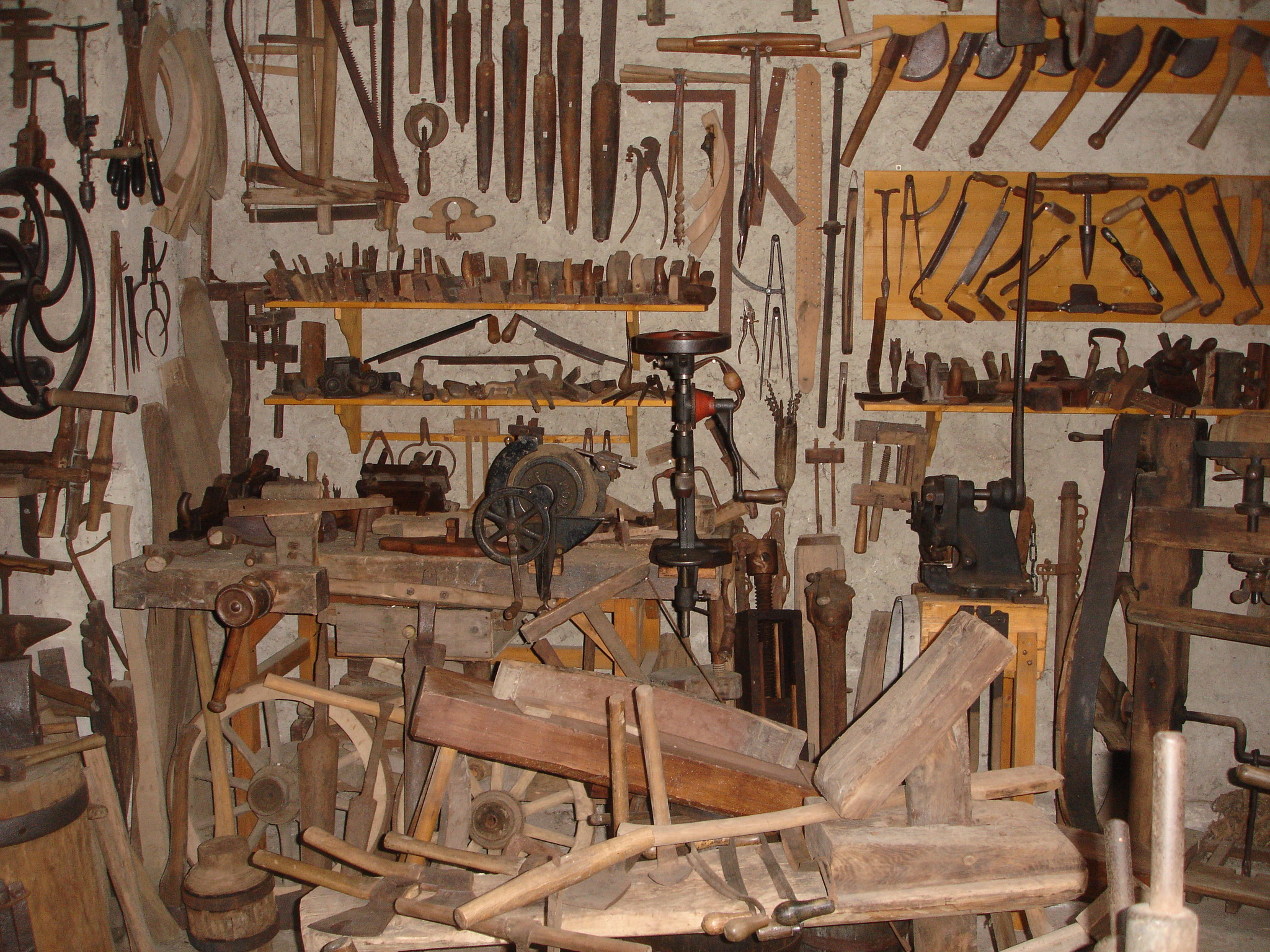
A wheelwright's shop

A wheelwright is a craftsman who builds or repairs wooden wheels. The word is the combination of "wheel" and the word "wright" (which comes from the Old English word "wryhta", meaning a worker - as also in shipwright and arkwright). This occupational name became the English surname Wright, and also appears in surnames like Cartwright and Wainwright.

These tradesmen made wheels for carts (cartwheels), wagons (wains), and various types of carriages. They also made the wheels, and often the frames, for spinning wheels, and the belt drives of steam powered machinery. First constructing the hub (called the nave), the spokes and the rim segments called felloes, and assembling them all into a unit working from the center of the wheel outwards. Most wheels were made from wood, but other materials have been used, such as bone and horn, for decorative or other purposes. Some earlier construction for wheels such as those used in early chariots were bound by rawhide that would be applied wet and would shrink whilst drying, compressing and binding the woodwork together. After many centuries wheels evolved to be straked with iron, a method of nailing iron plates onto the felloes to protect against wear on the ground and to help bind the wheel together. Straking was considered to be a less skilled practice and could be done with less knowledge and equipment. This made the wheels easier to service without the need for a blacksmith.

Over millennia the overall appearance of the wheel barely changed but subtle changes to the design such as dishing and staggered spokes helped keep up with the demands of a changing world. These small changes in design made a massive improvement to the strength of the wheel whilst reducing its weight; vehicles then became more efficient to build and use.

== History ==
Early wooden wheels were solid, made from slabs of trees. They were heavy but the simple construction did not require much skill. Wheels with spokes were lighter. They could be constructed with smaller trees and built larger in diameter because they were not limited by the size of trees in the region. However, spoked wheels required precise spacing and careful calculations to construct a perfect circle. It is thought that the special craft of wheelwright started with the invention of the spoke. Rural areas without access to a wheelwright continued to make solid wheels.

Due to the skill and experience required for making wheels, in Europe the wheelwright was formed into an identifiable trade.

== Parts of a wheel ==
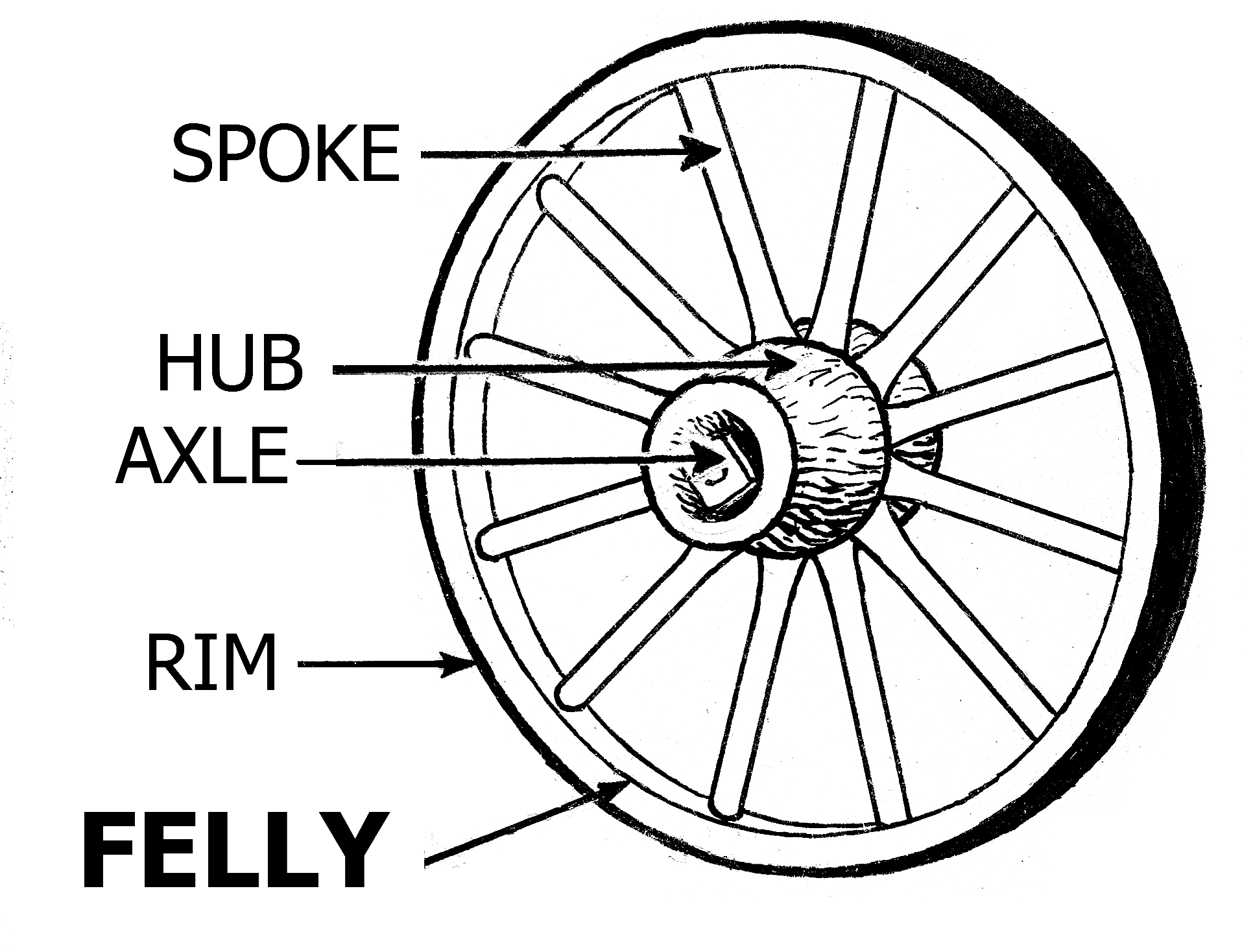
Parts of a wheel

A wooden wheel consists of main parts, the nave or hub at the centre of the wheel, the spokes radiating out from the centre, and the felloes around the outside. The wheel is bound by a steel or iron tyre depending on its historical period and purpose.

The nave is the central block of the wheel. In a wooden-spoked wheel, the nave acts as the hub. One end of each spoke is set into the nave in a process called tennoning. In older wheels, the nave had a 6-inch sleeve that fit over the axle to keep the wheel from wobbling; it required frequent greasing. More modern carriage wheels use bearings.

Spokes are wooden sticks that fit into the nave at one end, and into the felloe at the other end.

A felloe is one of several curved pieces of wood that when pieced together make the rim of a wheel. They are fitted onto the outer ends of the spokes. Sometimes spelled "felly". The number of felloes required to make a circle varied by region, era and size of wheel—with a minimum of two half-circles of bent wood, to multiple felloes per wheel with at least two spokes per felloe. Felloes are part of wood joinery and are only seen in wooden wheels, not modern metal carriage wheels.

The rim is the outer edge of a wheel, although some refer to the tyre as rim.

The tyre or tire is a protective strip that goes outside the felloes. Tyres were made of iron or steel, usually as a hoop and fitted hot around the rim. As it cooled and shrank it tightened the joints of the spokes-to-felloes and spokes-to-nave, strengthening the wheel and making it more rigid. Metal tyres are very noisy on hard road surfaces, so many carriages wheels were made with solid rubber tyres fitted into a metal channel.

Due to age or dry climate, a wheel would shrink and the metal hoop tyre would become loose. Routinely, the hoop would be removed, 'shrunk', heated and refitted to make the wheel tight again. Tools to shrink the hoops were called "tire upsetters" or "tire shrinkers".

== Woods ==
The main woods used are elm for the nave, oak for the spokes and ash for the felloes although this can vary in some areas depending on availability of timber, climate, and style of production. Sometimes hickory is substituted for oak and ash as it is easier to bend for mass production and is quite springy for light wheels that require a bit of flexibility. Elm is used for its interwoven grain, which prevents the nave from splitting with the force of the spokes being driven in tight. Oak is used because it doesn't bend, compress or flex and transfers load pressures directly from the felloes to the nave. Ash is used for its flexibility and springy nature, acting as a form of suspension and protecting against shock damage.

These three timbers are in short supply in the UK due to disease pressures of the tree species, and the US has become a major supplier on the international market. Black locust is sometimes used as a substitute for elm. Other woods may be used for repairing wheels or replacing parts for inside-displayed vehicles that are not in working use, such as using Tulip Poplar. Steam bending of felloes has been common in the US, and is easier and quicker to produce than the traditional seasoned and cut pieces in the UK.

== Industrial age ==
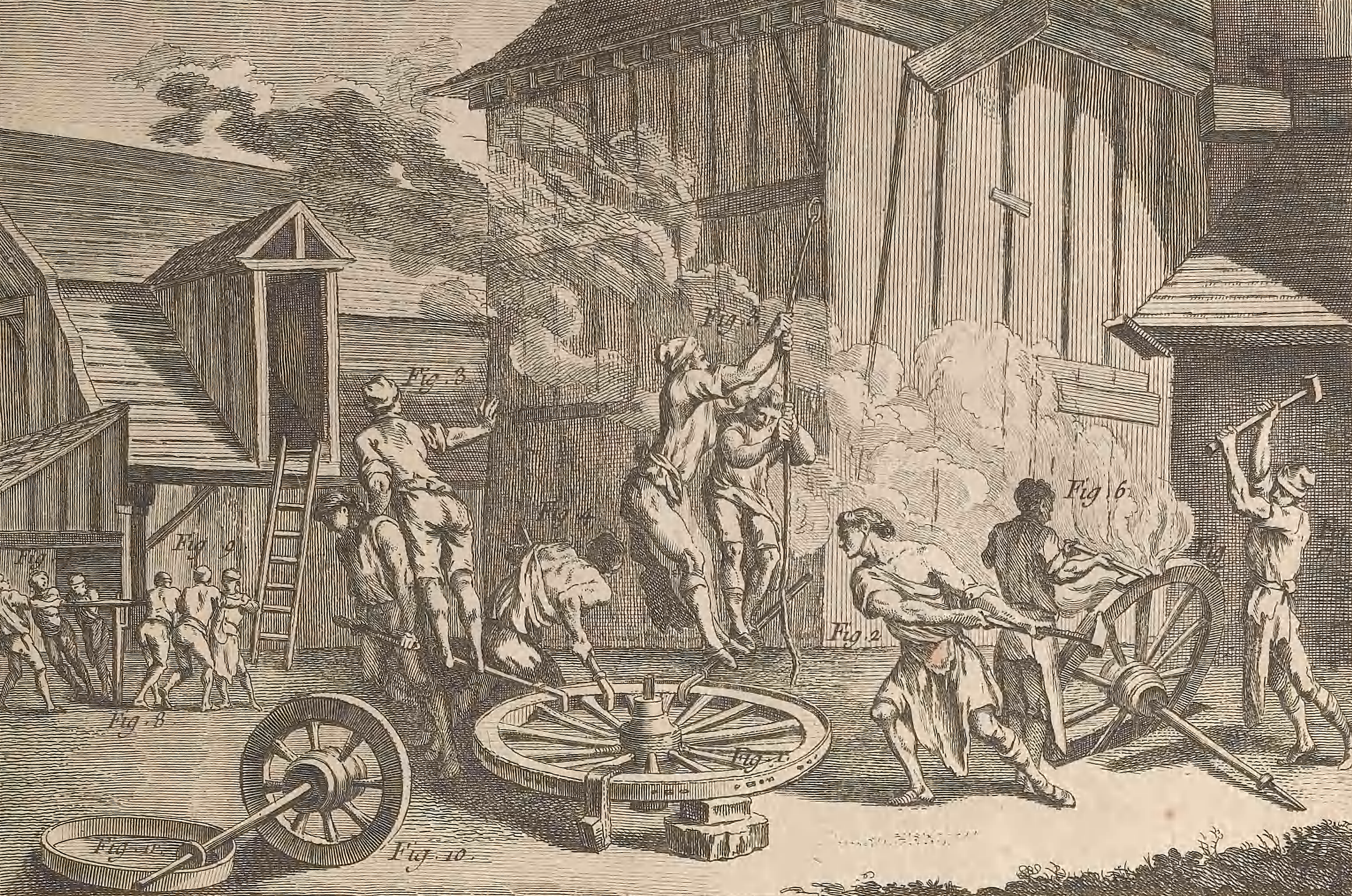
This plate published in a volume of Encyclopédie in 1769 shows both methods of shoeing a wheel. In the centre the labourers are using hammers and "devil's claws" to fit a hoop onto the felloe, and on the right they're hammering strakes into place.

During the industrial age, iron strakes were replaced by a solid iron tyre custom made by a blacksmith after the wheelwright had measured each wheel to ensure proper fit. Iron tyres were always made slightly smaller than the wheel in circumference. They were expanded by heating in a fire, and while hot they were hammered, and pulled by a levered hook, onto the rim of the wheel. The hot tyre was then cooled by placing it into water. This shrank it onto the wood, and closed the wooden joints. Tyres were fastened to the wheels with nails, or tyre bolts. The metal tyres were drilled before being placed on the wheel. Tyre-bolts were less likely than tyre-nails to fall off because they were bolted through the felloes. Both countersunk and flush finished to the wheel's outer surface.

During the second half of the 19th century, the use of pre-manufactured iron hubs and other factory-made wood, iron and rubber wheel parts became increasingly common. Companies such as Henry Ford's developed manufacturing processes that soon made the village wheelwright obsolete. With the onset of two world wars, the trade soon went into decline and was very rare by the 1960s and almost extinct by the year 2000. However, owing to the efforts of organisations like the Worshipful Company of Wheelwrights, wheelwrights still continue to operate in the UK.

In modern times, wheelwrights continue to make and repair a wide variety of wheels, including those made from wood and banded by iron tyres. The word wheelwright remains a term usually used for someone who makes and repairs wheels for horse-drawn vehicles, although it is sometimes used to refer to someone who repairs wheels, wheel alignment, rims, drums, discs and wire spokes on modern vehicles such as automobiles, buses and trucks. Wheels for horse-drawn vehicles continue to be constructed and repaired for use by people who use such vehicles for farming, competitions and presentations of historical events such as reenactments and living history.

== Heritage craft ==
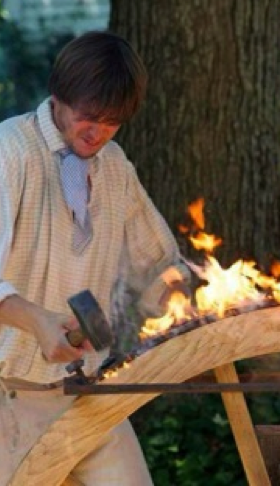
Worldwide Wheelwright Phill Gregson fitting iron "strakes" to a traditional wooden wheel in 2016

In the second half of the 20th century, wheelwright training declined sharply due to a lack of demand for new wooden wheels. Formal wheelwright training nearly disappeared. The skills were kept alive by small businesses, museums, and heritage organizations such as the Colonial Williamsburg Foundation (USA), the Countryside Agency (UK), and the Worshipful Company of Wheelwrights (UK) that continued to teach and demonstrate traditional methods.

The Worshipful Company of Wheelwrights in London is a historic guild that still actively supports the trade of wheelwrighting, and keeps a list of practising wheelwrights in England, Wales and Northern Ireland. For more than a century, they have run or overseen formal wheelwright training programs. They maintain professional outreach, public demonstrations, connections with working wheelwrights, and host annual gatherings of the craft community. In 2000, Herefordshire College of Technology undertook training and apprenticing of wheelwrights to National Vocational Qualification certification until external funding ended.

Colonial Williamsburg, an 18th-century living history museum in Virginia, USA has an ongoing apprenticeship program run by the Historic Trades department. It is a six- or seven-year contract to become journeymen or journeywomen, with limited openings. According to Jay Gaynor, director of Historic Trades, "the program re-creates a realistic model of eighteenth-century production systems".

Master wheelwright Phillip Gregson reports that there are a number of wheelwright sources of training and production in North America. Remington Carriage Museum in Canada has a working restoration and wheelwright's shop. Stutzman Amish wheelwright shop in Ohio still produces around 200 wheels every two weeks. Hansen Wheel and Wagon Shop in South Dakota builds wheels for contemporary markets, and Harvey Chandler's wheelwright shop in Kentucky produces vehicles from scratch.

== See also ==
- Artillery wheel
- List of obsolete occupations
- Tyring platform
- Worshipful Company of Wheelwrights
