= Alexander Wagenaar =

Alexander C. Wagenaar
- Education: Calvin College, University of Michigan
- Awards: Jellinek Award (1999), Innovator's Award from Robert Wood Johnson Foundation (2001)
- Scientific career
- Fields: Addiction medicine, alcoholism
- Workplaces: University of Florida College of Medicine
- Thesis: The minimum legal drinking age: a time-series impact evaluation (1980)

Alexander C. Wagenaar is professor of health outcomes and policy at the University of Florida College of Medicine, where he also serves on the graduate faculty.

== Education ==
Wagenaar received his B.A. in sociology from Calvin College and his M.S.W. (in Program Evaluation and Research) and Ph.D. (in Health Behavior) from the University of Michigan.

== Career ==
Wagenaar worked at the University of Michigan as a research scientist from 1980 to 1989. From 1989 to 1990, he worked as a visiting scholar at the Marin Institute for the Prevention of Alcohol and Other Drug Problems. From 1990 until 2004, he was a faculty member at the University of Minnesota.

== Research ==
Wagenaar is known for his research into the beneficial effects of alcohol laws, particularly alcohol taxes. He has also studied the effects of raising the legal drinking age in the United States to 21 on alcohol consumption.

== Awards and honors ==
In 1999, Wagenaar received the Jellinek Award for research on alcohol. In 2001, he received the Innovator's Award from the Robert Wood Johnson Foundation. In 2004, he was named an ISI highly cited researcher.
