= Cartwright High School =

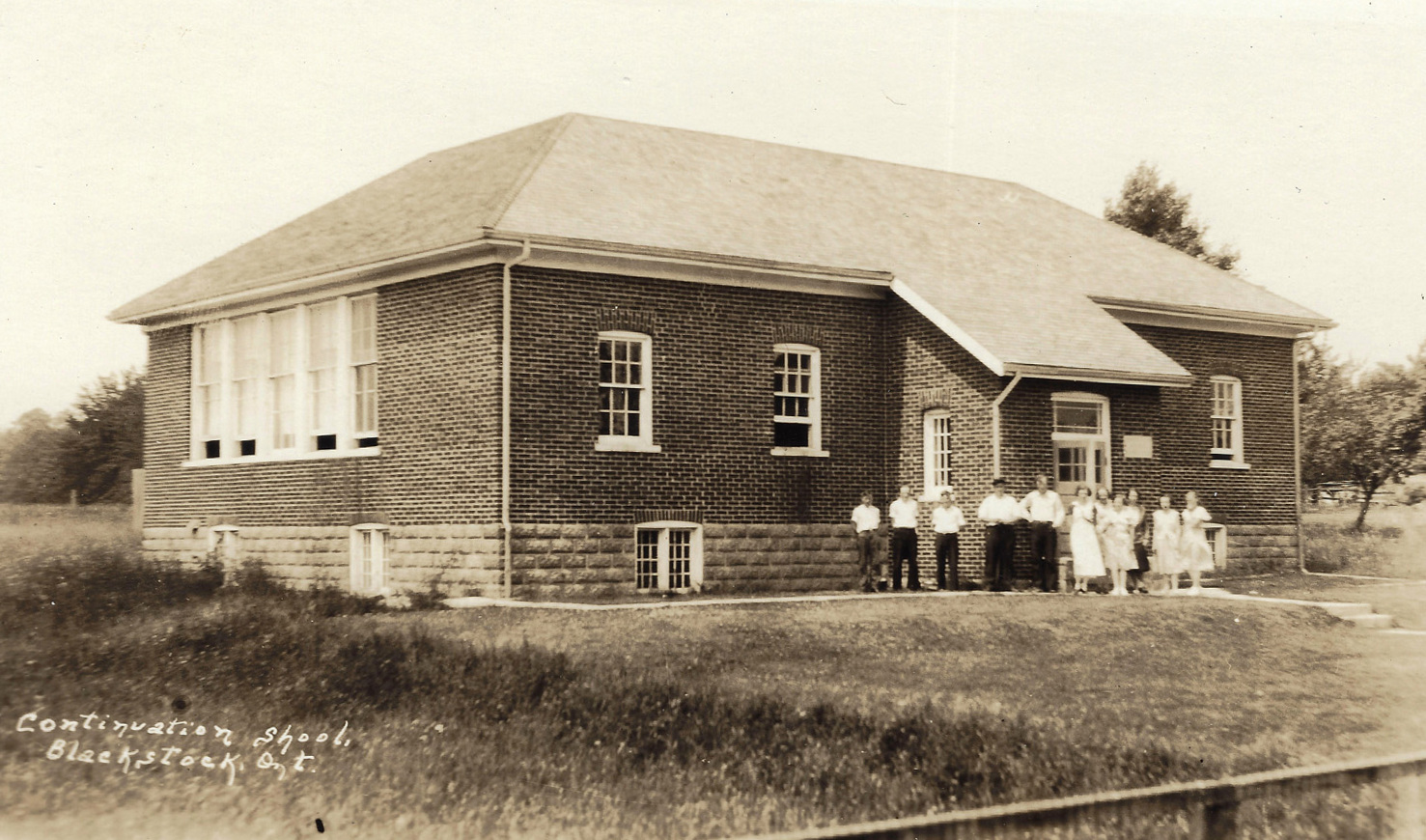
- Cartwright High School, c. 1930s

Location
- 14 220 Old Scugog Road; Blackstock, Ontario, L0B 1B0; Canada

Information
- School type: Public
- Founded: 1924
- Closed: 2013
- School board: Durham District School Board
- Grades: 9-12
- Enrolment: 115 (2012)
- Language: English
- Website: cartwrighths.ddsbschools.ca

Cartwright High School was located in Blackstock, Ontario within the Durham District School Board. The school had approximately 115 students in grades 9–12. The school closed in June 2013.

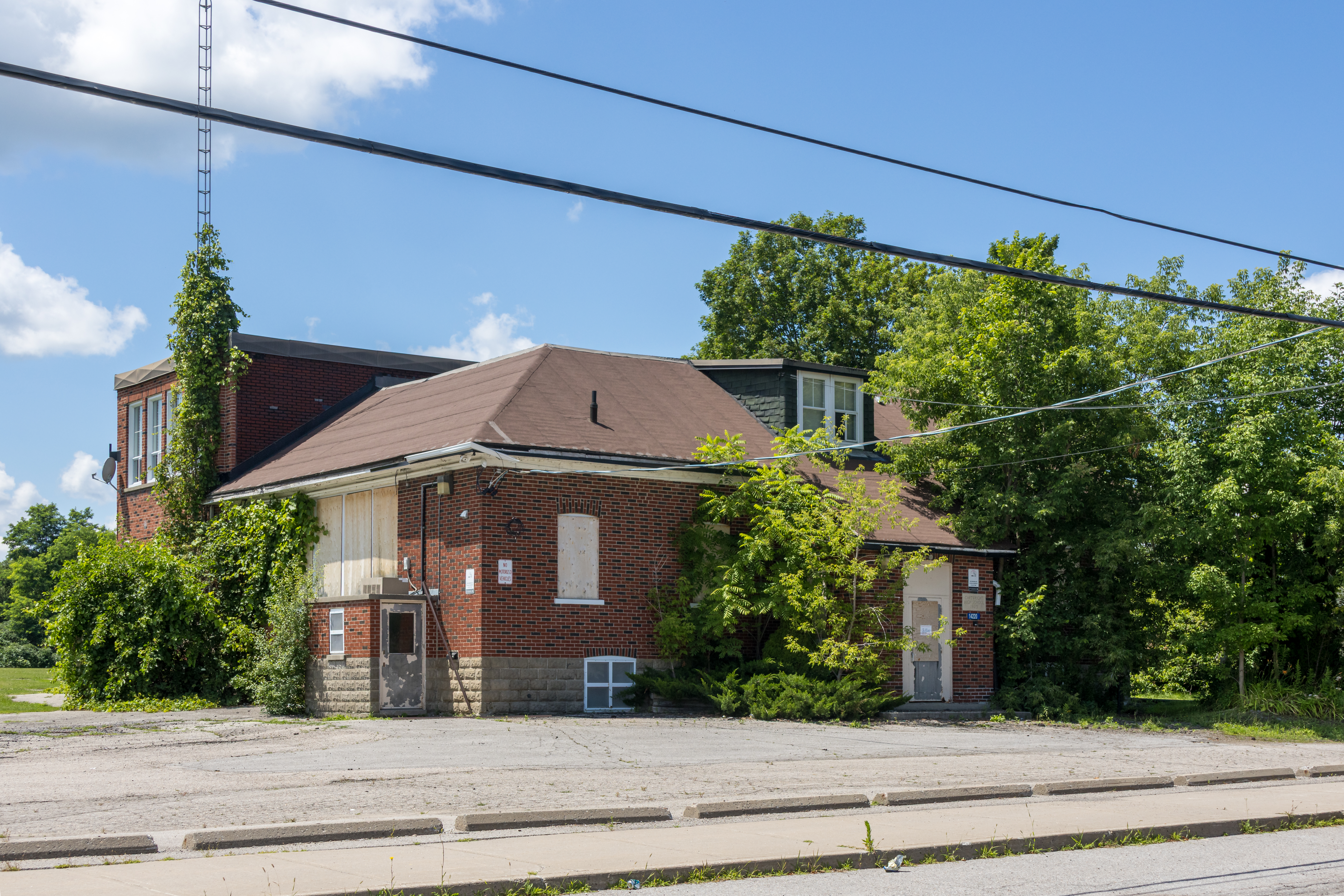
Cartwright High School closed and boarded up, July 2026

== Feeder schools ==
- Cartwright Central Public School

== See also ==
- List of high schools in Ontario
