= Wegner Peak =

Landform in Mohave County, Arizona, U.S.

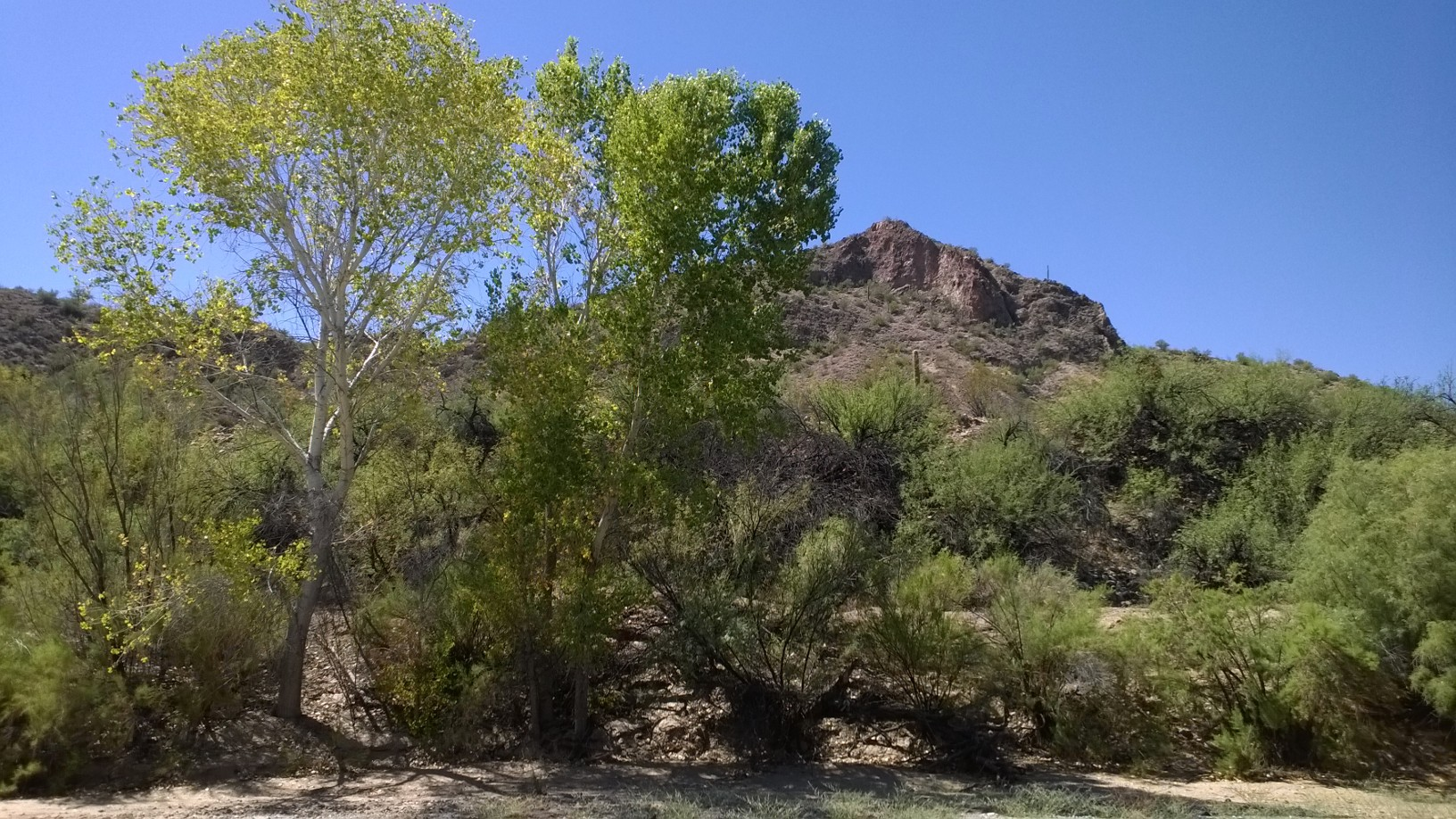
- Wegner Peak as seen from Hackberry Canyon

Highest point
- Elevation: 1,850 ft (560 m)
- Prominence: 510 ft (160 m)
- Coordinates: 34°25′54″N 113°36′05″W

Geography
- Location: Mohave County, Arizona, U.S.
- Topo map(s): USGS Signal Mountain, AZ

Geology
- Rock age: Mesoproterozoic
- Mountain type: Granite

Wegner Peak is a porphyritic biotite granite peak of volcanic origin, located next to the Big Sandy River south of Signal, Arizona, United States. This high point rises abruptly above the Big Sandy River valley near Hackberry Canyon, and is edged on the eastern side by a raised alluvial plain. The peak stands out due to its honey-gold and pinkish white colors which contrast with the surrounding local terrain. The peak is 3.5 miles (6 km) SSE of Signal.

The highest point of Wegner Peak is 1,850 feet (564 m) in elevation, while its base is at approximately 1,340 feet (410 m). Wegner Peak sits mostly on private land and is bordered to the south and east by the Arrastra Mountain Wilderness.

Wegner Peak has no name listed on topographic maps but the local name, used by some residents and hikers, originates from the family name of the peak's landowners.

== Geology ==
Wegner Peak was originally part of a series of igneous layers. The rock has been tilted with the formation of the Artillery Mountains. The mountain straddles the division of a local contact fault. The peak is part of a pluton composed of early Middle Proterozoic granitic rocks (1400–1450 Ma) from the Calymmian Period. Wegner Peak is mostly porphyritic biotite granite with large microcline phenocrysts, with local fine-grained border phases and aplite. The Big Sandy River bends around the mountain cutting through Hackberry and Signal Canyons approximately 500 feet (152 m) below the peak. Madril Wash flanks the northwest side of the peak, nearly isolating the mass from the rest of the mountain range.
