= Edgar Thomas Wainwright =

Scottish sculptor (1868-1???)

Edgar Thomas Wainwright was a sculptor born in Glasgow, Scotland in 1868 before emigrating to the United States. He moved to New York City in 1889 and to New Orleans in 1897.

Wainwright was an accomplished artist and sculptor, although he apprenticed under the tutelage of various American sculptors after landing in New York at the age of 21. He learned the art of bronze sand casting at this young age.

Because of this early first hand knowledge of foundry techniques, his bronze sculptures display a very high degree of detail, workmanship, and finish. He was especially known for bronze relief work, and held commissions for local churches in New Orleans.

In about 1900, Wainwright decided to end his short career as a sculptor.
