= Wegener Canyon =

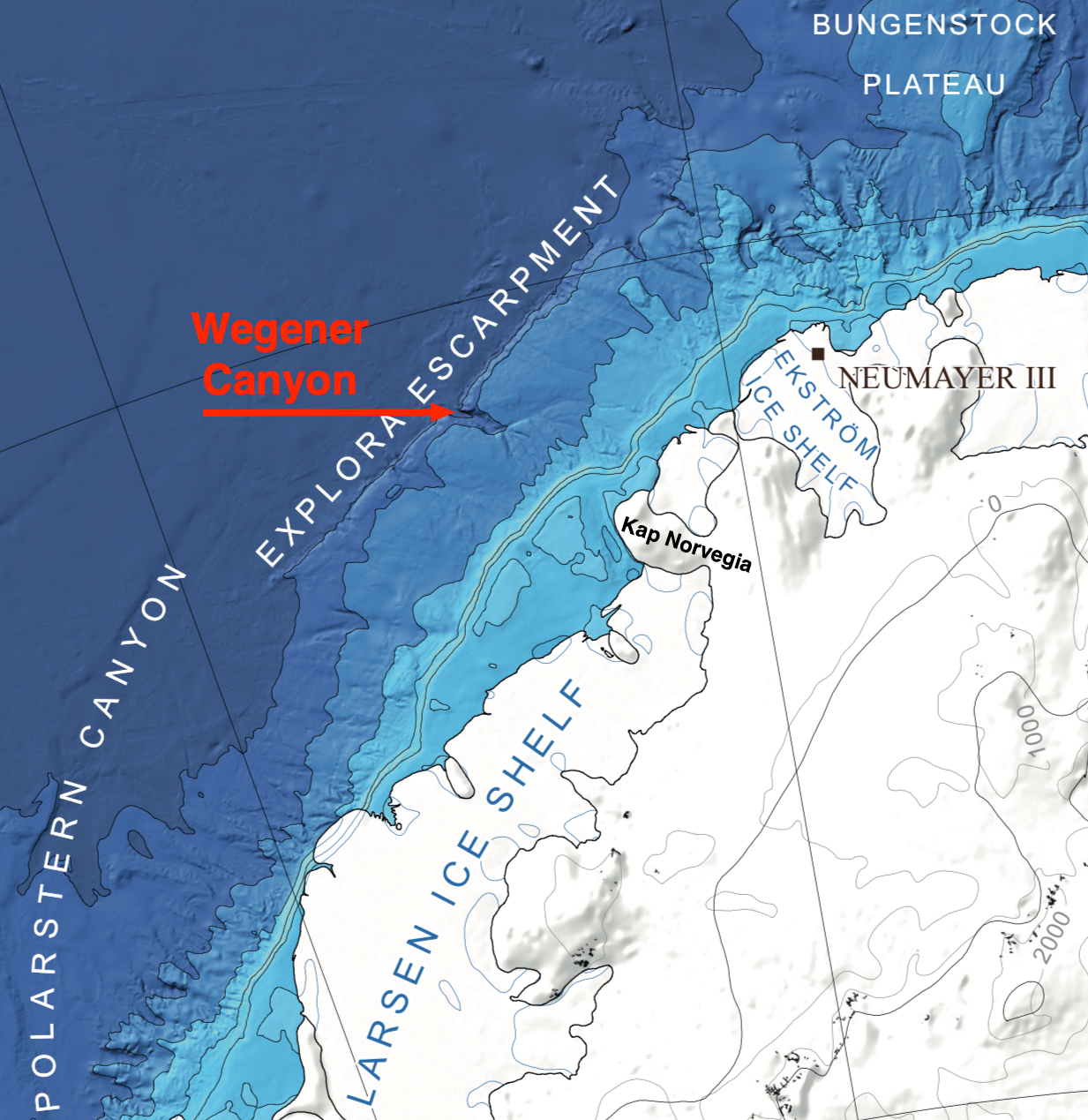
Location of Wegener Canyon at the Antarctic continental margin in the eastern Weddell Sea

Wegener Canyon (70°45′S 14°0′W) is a submarine canyon named for Alfred Wegener. It is located between Kap Norvegia and the Explora Escarpment as a feature for sediment transport at the Antarctic continental margin. The Canyon was mapped during various expeditions of the German research vessel RV Polarstern with a swath sonar system. The name was proposed by Hans Werner Schenke, Alfred Wegener Institute for Polar and Marine Research, Bremerhaven, Germany. Name approved 7/89 (ACUF 233).
