= Wheelwright (surname) =

Wheelwright is an English surname. Notable people with the surname include:

- Edmund M. Wheelwright (1854–1912), American architect
- Edward Lawrence Wheelwright (1921–2007), Australian economist and political theorist
- Esther Wheelwright (1696–1780), Ursuline nun in Québec
- Horace William Wheelwright (1815–1865), English naturalist and writer
- John Wheelwright (1592–1679), English clergyman and early American settler
- John Brooks Wheelwright (1897–1940), American poet
- Philip Wheelwright (1901–1970), American philosopher
- William Wheelwright (1798–1873), American businessman
