= Oscar Wegner =

Tennis coach (born 1939)

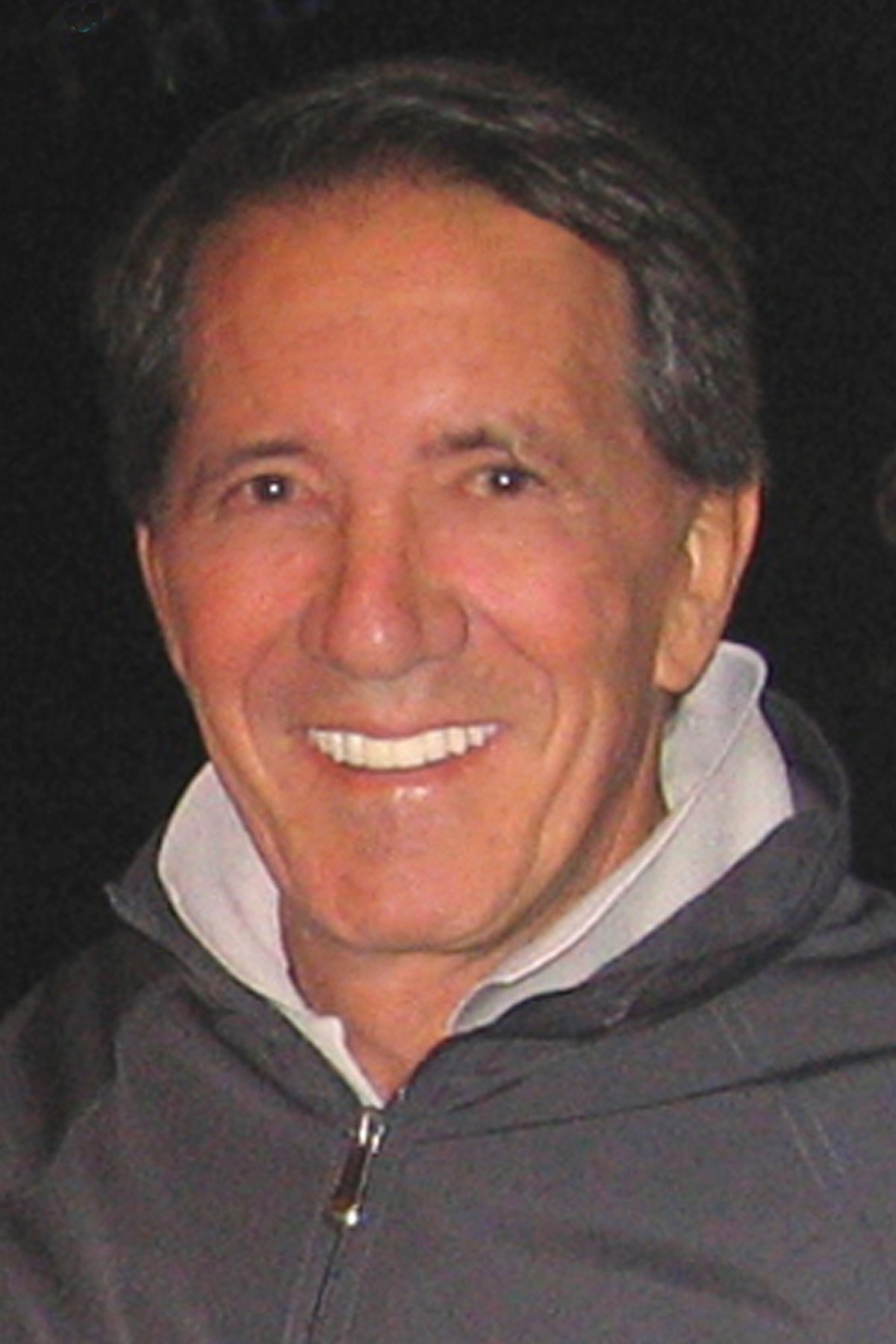
- Full name: Oscar Enrique Wegner
- Country (sports): United States
- Residence: Clearwater, Florida
- Born: July 26, 1939 (age 86) Buenos Aires, Argentina
- Official website: tennisteacher.com

Oscar Wegner is a tennis coach and pre-open-era tour player, author, and the creator of Modern Tennis Methodology, a tennis-teaching system which he began developing in 1968. He is the founder and president of Oscar Wegner Enterprises, Inc. and Tennis Kids For Life, Inc. a non-profit corporation. He also founded several other projects such as The Modern Tennis Methodology Coaches Association, The Oscar Wegner Elite Training Program and The Oscar Wegner Modern Tennis College. He is a USPTA Professional 1, the highest tested rating possible in that organization. He teaches publicly and privately throughout the United States, where he became a citizen in 2005. He currently resides and coaches in Clearwater, Florida.

== Early life ==
Oscar Wegner was born and raised in Buenos Aires, Argentina, the son of Dalmira Ofelia Jimenez and Oscar Pablo Wegner, Chief Engineer of Argentinian government oil fields in Comodoro Rivadavia (YPF) and an initiator of Aero Club Comodoro Rivadavia. He attended the Instituto Euskal-Echea, Liceo Naval Militar Almirante Guillermo Brown and Colegio San Jose. At the age of 12 he learned to sail at the Club Yacimientos de Petroliferos Fiscales, marking the beginning of a lifelong love of the sport. Later he joined the Club Nautico San Isidro, where he continued sailing, and at age 14 took up tennis, soon becoming the #1 junior player at his club and entering national tournaments. Beginning at 15 years of age and in the next few years he saw Jack Kramer, Pancho Gonzales, Tony Trabert, Lew Hoad and Ken Rosewall play in Buenos Aires and began to model some of his strokes after theirs. Notable players in Argentina he looked up to at the time were Enrique Morea and Eduardo Soriano. Seeing those players travel the world he decided he would try it himself. By the age of 16 he had earned a 100-ton motorsailer vessel pilot's license and was acting as chair umpire for finals of international tournaments in Buenos Aires. After graduating from secondary school he studied engineering and surveying at the Universidad de Buenos Aires, was drafted into the Argentine Air Force. He later decided to join the international tennis circuit. He played his first tennis tournament outside Argentina in Asunción, Paraguay in 1961, beginning an enthusiasm for traveling which has continued throughout his life. Wegner made his first trip to Brazil in 1962 to meet his father's cousin German Frers who was in the Buenos Aires – Rio sailboat race, which his cousin had won in 1950. In Rio de Janeiro Wegner practiced tennis with Lucy Maia at Fluminense Football Club, attended soccer matches and fell in love with the country. He returned on several occasions to enjoy the city, visit friends and play tennis with locals such as Jorge Paulo Lemann and coach Pepe Aguero at the Country Club of Rio de Janeiro.

== Touring career ==
Oscar Wegner played on the international tennis circuit from 1963 to 1967. After completing his military service he traveled through South America, the Caribbean, Europe, then Africa, back to Europe, the US and back to South America. The challenge of traveling around the world with the small budget of a few hundred dollars of "under the table" expenses paid by the tournaments was very exciting to the young Wegner, and in five years he visited over 30 countries and met numerous top players and local personalities. His friendship with top players, including Manolo Santana, Roy Emerson and Martin Mulligan, helped him come in contact with tournament directors and receive invitations to participate. He gave tennis lessons and served as a chair umpire to earn extra money along the way. Tales of his adventures playing in tournaments and hitchhiking through South America, Europe and Africa were reported in magazines and newspapers during his travels.

Wegner represented Argentina in July 1965 at the annual meeting of the ILTF in London. There he proposed a change of the Davis Cup Americas Zone rules. Up to that point the Americas Zone rules required that all finals be played within the confines of the North American section, forcing all South American teams to travel to the US, Mexico, or Canada to compete. The proposal, which was passed by an overwhelming majority and against the wishes of Australia, the US and Great Britain, specified that the finals would be played on alternate home and away locations (a rule which was common to the rest of the world). Beginning in 1966 the finals of the Americas Zone were played under the revised rule, which may have resulted in the USA losing on red clay in Porto Alegre, Brazil in 1966 and in Guayaquil, Ecuador in 1967.

After sustaining a severe hamstring injury in Curaçao in March 1967 he was forced to quit the tour. Staying behind while the other players moved on to Caracas, he later traveled to Mexico City, the second-to-last stop on the Caribbean circuit, to say goodbye to his friends and colleagues.

== Coaching career ==
After leaving the tour in 1967 Wegner traveled to Los Angeles and arranged tournaments in the Caribbean and Latin America for George MacCall, then USA Davis Cup Captain and Owner of the National Tennis League (NTL), which had 6 players and 2 alternates under contract: Laver, Emerson, Rosewall, Stolle, Gimeno, Gonzales, and Segura and Olmedo. Also during this time Wegner met with another tour player, Mike Davies, Tour Director for Lamar Hunt's World Championship Tennis (WCT), which represented The Handsome Eight and discussed the advantages of both groups playing tournaments together. Hunt would later purchase the NTL from George MacCall.

In 1968, after recovering from his injury Wegner took a position at the Beverly Hills Tennis Club as Assistant Coach to Pancho Segura. Because Pancho liked Oscar's emerging teaching style he permitted Oscar to coach many of his celebrity clients, including Dinah Shore's son Jody, Charlton Heston, Anne Douglas, Barbara Marx, Ava Gardner, Dean Martin Jr. and the children of Robert Taylor, Terrance and Tessa. During this period Wegner tested and developed a revolutionary new way of teaching tennis that he would later name Modern Tennis Methodology™.

In the Summer of 1969 Wegner taught at the Westside Tennis Club, home of the USLTA National Championship (now the US Open) in Forest Hills, New York as Assistant Coach to fr:Warren Woodcock. Next Wegner moved to Florida where he worked as Assistant Coach at David Park Tennis Center in Hollywood, Florida. In 1970 he took the position of Head Tennis Coach for the City of West Palm Beach. In 1971 he went to Le Club International in Fort Lauderdale, Florida as Head Pro.

In 1972, Wegner left Florida for Spain and became Director for Junior Development at Real Club de Tenis de Santander. The following year he was hired as the Junior Davis Captain for Spain and one of three National Coaches in Barcelona for the Escuela Nacional de Tenis at the Real Club de Polo then the Club de Tenis Andrés Gimeno. While there Wegner persuaded the national coaching team including Joaquin Moure that reinforcing open stance and topspin was the best way to develop their juniors into players of international stature. According to Bud Collins, who met Oscar Wegner in 1973 in Miami Beach where he was coaching the Spanish Junior boys team in the worldwide Sunshine Cup tournament: "Those kids were hitting extra hard and with plenty of topspin in a way that startled spectators – and me."

In 1974, he left Spain to take the position of Head Pro at the Aventura Country Club in North Miami Beach. That winter he served as the Tennis Pro at the Marco Polo Hotel in Palm Beach. He decided to build his own club, The Tennis Club International in Fort Lauderdale in 1975. After 3 years he sold his club and for the next 2 years he taught tennis, sailing and windsurfing at the Galt Ocean Mile Hotel in Fort Lauderdale, then, in the Winter of 1981 became Director of the Junior Academy at the Laver Racquet Club in Del Ray Beach, where he met Carlos Alves, and Jürgen Fassbender. In 1982 Alves invited him to Florianópolis, Brazil where Wegner spent a month working with a group of young players, including Gustavo Kuerten, then 5 years old, prior to going to Germany for the summer to coach at the Weiden Tennis Club in Cologne at Fassbender's invitation. Fassbender later wrote: "Oscar's techniques are incredible. He was with me in Germany and the students started to call him the 'American who could teach tennis in two hours'. Over and over, he had total beginners that would rally 40, 60 balls back and forth in just two hours of instruction. He also helped the Weiden Tennis Club have an undefeated junior team that year and to get our main team up to the Bundesliga." After spending 4 months in Germany Wegner returned to Florida and worked as Owner and Head Pro of the American Tennis Academy in Sunrise for the next 3 years.

After the academy's lease expired in 1985, Wegner went back to Florianópolis to coach at Alves' tennis academy at ASTEL. Living in the Alves home for 10 months Wegner worked daily with 8-year-old Kuerten and other youngsters. For the next 4 years he visited Florianópolis and Itajaí often, coaching Kuerten and many other players including Márcio Carlsson, Maria Fernanda Alves and Rita Cruz Lima at ASTEL and Itamirim Clube de Campo. He also helped them with their games during their visits to US tournaments including the Orange Bowl for the next several years, with the exception of Guga, who started working with Larri Passos from 1990 onwards.

Wegner self-published his first book "Tennis in 2 Hours" in December 1989. Of its contents Martin Mulligan wrote: "This book is incredible! It describes to a "T" what I felt when I was at the top of my game. It is amazing that Oscar made it so simple to learn." During the Sunshine Cup, Wegner gave a copy of his new book "Tennis in 2 Hours" to Russian team captain Anatoly Lepyoshin, personally signed with the quote: "To the Russian Tennis Federation, with my best wishes, Oscar Wegner". The following year Bud Collins traveled to Moscow for the first Kremlin Cup and was asked by Russian coaches for more copies of Oscar Wegner's book.

In the fall of 1990, he returned to Boca Raton private-coaching players including Vince Spadea and his sisters Luanne and Diana at St. Andrews School, where Luanne is currently on the Alumni Association board of directors (he had previously coached them at the Laver Racquet Club when they first started playing, instructing their parents on how to coach them with his techniques). In January of that year Wegner coached Björn Borg for a month at The Colony and the Nick Bollettieri Tennis Academy in Sarasota and Bradenton, Florida. Of the experience, Borg wrote: "Oscar is a great coach. He help me regain my strokes and my feel for the ball."

After seeing Wegner's methodology at work in person with four of his own children ranging from 16 to 30 plus a 7-year-old granddaughter, Bud Collins was convinced of its efficacy and consented to write the foreword to the second edition of Wegners' book (released at Lipton Tennis Championships in Key Biscayne, Florida March 1992), commenting: "I think you'll find it worthwhile to dump the past and join Oscar in your tennis future. In listening to him I've unlearned a few things myself that I long considered gospel." In 1993 and 1994, Wegner worked for the Greater Miami Tennis Patron Foundation under Donna Floyd Fales in conjunction with City government and the Miami Police Department in the inner city area of Overtown, establishing a successful tennis program in the elementary schools and parks. He worked as Tennis Pro at the Newfield Bath and Tennis Club in Stamford, Connecticut during the summer of 1993.

== TV, sportscasting and other media ==
From November 1991 through October 1995, Wegner was featured on the instructional segment of The New Tennis Magazine Show (renamed Tennis Television With Brad Holbrook in 1993), exposing the differences between conventional tennis teaching methods and his own. The segments, shot in New York, Florida and Pennsylvania were shown nationally on Prime Network and aired in Florida on Sunshine Sports Network. During this time Venus and Serena Williams had moved from Compton, California to Florida where they trained under the supervision of their father Richard Williams at the Macci Tennis Academy, then left Macci's to train exclusively with their father thereafter, achieving tremendous success, from singles, doubles and mixed doubles titles to reaching #3 and #4 in the world by the end of 1999. Mike Daley introduced Wegner to Richard Williams during a satellite tournament at the Patricio Apey Tennis Academy in the Miami Airport Marriott in January 1999, and according to Oscar: "He greeted me with a great smile and said 'Oscar, it is an honor to meet you. I used to watch your show. Your techniques made so much sense that I taped them and had my girls watch them every day.'"

From April 1994 to December 1999 Wegner, who speaks 5 languages, worked for ESPN International as a tennis commentator in Spanish for Davis Cup, ATP and WTA tournaments including the Australian Open and the French Open, and in 2000 he joined the es:Panamerican Sports Network doing ATP and WTA tournaments including Wimbledon. Through these broadcasts Wegner became well known throughout South America. Also contributing to Wegner's worldwide recognition were 40 "Play Like The Pros With Oscar Wegner" Tennis Tips, instructional vignettes both in English and in Spanish, which were broadcast by ESPN International from June 1997 through September 1999 several times daily in more than 150 countries around the world, including airings during the Super Bowl, NBA Finals, Stanley Cup Final and US Open Golf Tournaments, generating over two billion impressions on television worldwide.

In 1992, segments of the Tennis Television shows were compiled into videotapes, which became available for purchase. In 1997 Wegner acquired the rights to the videos and initiated a website in order to sell the videos and introduce his tennis methodology to the public. He also made tips and articles as well as the second edition of his book available free of charge on the site. Over the past 14 years Wegner's website has had millions of visits.

In 2005, Wegner published the third edition of his book and a new video, produced for the first time in DVD format. He has subsequently produced 5 more DVDs and offers the 5 original videos as "classic" DVDs.

In 2007, Wegner formed his own coaching organization, which currently has over 400 members worldwide.

== Coaching System ==
Oscar Wegner recognized early on in his coaching career, that the way tennis was traditionally taught bore little resemblance to the way the pros played. Thanks to his keen eye and experience on the tour he was able to distinguish between the "modern" method referred to by Bill Tilden and the traditional techniques and so-called conventional wisdom of tennis instruction, and set out to devise a more effective approach. His system of teaching tennis is based on the premise that players at every age and ability level can and should use the same basic techniques employed by the top players in the game, hence his motto "Play Like The Pros". The system is based on allowing the player to use instinct and natural movement together with fundamental techniques that emulate the best strokes of the all-time great players in tennis. These fundamentals include an emphasis on open stance, highly developed hand–eye coordination, impeccable timing characterized by waiting rather than early preparation of the stroke, and absence of self-conscious emphasis on footwork. The simplicity of the method is summed in the phrase "Find, Feel, Finish".

Many of today's tennis teaching professionals, combining elements from the past with the term "modern tennis", mirror techniques which conform in part with the basic principles of Wegner's methodology. Some remain critical of Wegner's techniques, others have modified their viewpoints and still others now openly advocate his original tenets. In a presentation at the 2008 USPTA World Conference, Nick Bollettieri admitted that after over 30 years of teaching the closed stance he now advocates the open stance, a mainstay of Wegner's method for over 40 years. In the 2008 Quickstart tennis practice and play plans manual, the forehand is illustrated with an open stance and finish over the shoulder and advises that "coaches who work with young players at the start of their tennis careers will recognize the importance of starting them off well and with success", while the 2009 USTA Quickstart teaching manual for parents and recreational coaches illustrates the forehand with a traditional closed-stance position with the racket finish toward the target. In a 2010 article for Tennis Magazine Rick Macci listed verbatim as the biggest myths of tennis instruction three of the "common tennis misconceptions" from Wegner's 1989 book. Chronological age and publication dates of other practitioners of modern tennis coaching techniques will indicate where on the timeline they relate to Wegner's methodology.

Wegner has written several articles for TennisOne, a leading tennis instructional site since 1996 "founded on the dream of bringing the best teaching pros around the world to everyone." In an introduction to one of his articles the editors of TennisOne wrote: "A lot has been written about the modern forehand with its natural movements, open stance, windshield-wiper swing, and most importantly, tracking the ball and waiting before taking the racquet back. Much of this has been pioneered by Oscar Wegner, who has been teaching this method since 1968. Back then, this was very controversial, however, history has proved him right." Although a 1991 review of his book "Tennis In 2 Hours" in Tennis magazine stated that Wegner: "advocates an outdated brand of tennis that over-relies on topspin" top players such as Tilden, Kramer, Laver, Borg, Lendl, Bruguera, Kuerten, Muster, Sabatini, Sánchez Vicario and Nadal demonstrate the timelessness and efficacy of huge topspin throughout the history of the sport.

In a 1992 episode of his TV series Tennis Television With Brad Holbrook, the host referred to Oscar Wegner as "The Father of Modern Tennis", initiating a reference that has been widely used and debated over the years, particularly in the past decade. Holbrook, who was largely responsible for launching Wegner's career in the US, is himself an avid tennis player and fan. Wegner denies that he "invented" modern tennis: "I didn't discover something new. It's the way the top players play. If you go back 60 years there are some players that were already playing this way."

David Bailey tennis footwork and fitness coach at Sydney Academy Tennis and creator of The Bailey Method, summarizes Oscar Wegner's Modern Tennis Methodology as follows: "Oscar's teachings make a lot of sense especially because the ideas are based on years of research and careful observation of how the modern day professionals hit the ball."

Referencing Wegner's influence on Russian tennis "Leading Russian Coach Tatiana Matokhniyuk, who mentored Nadia Petrova and Marcus Baghdatis as juniors said of Oscar's system, 'You won't find beginners improve this quickly with any other method. It is the only way to teach at all levels. It's how we do it in Russia; surely everyone teaches this way.'"

Wegner considers his greatest accomplishment the dissemination of his tennis teaching technology to coaches over the past 40 years. In addition to hundreds of tennis teaching professionals, high school coaches and parents certified in his methodology numerous coaches worldwide have been influenced by Wegner including Angel Jimenez, Lorenzo Fargas, Carlos Alves, Richard Williams, Chan Srichaphan, Jasenko Palos, Scott Gilmore, Sheri Slobin, David Glackin, Tia Hall, Bob Ruzanic and Vincent Spadea Sr. Ron Waite, certified USPTR tennis instructor who has successfully coached several NCAA Division III teams, has trained with many of the game's leading instructors (including Wegner), and writes the "Turbo Tennis" column on tennisserver.com, refers often to Wegner's methodology saying: "Oscar is a most unconventional tennis teacher. Some doubt his methods and insights, but I would beg to differ. In many ways, I believe Oscar was the "forerunner" with respect to the modern game. His "unorthodox" doctrine has made him an outcast of sorts. But, his devotees will certainly support that he knows what he is doing. I am one. His unorthodox methods and techniques have in major measure become a new orthodoxy!"

During his introduction of Wegner at the 2011 USPTA Nor Cal Annual Convention Dick Gould remarked: "Sometimes you listen to things a little different from what you've done before and Oscar and I go back a number of years...get to know him a little bit...to talk to him. He is not afraid to test the barriers a little bit, he is not afraid to say, hey, you don't quite do it like this and to look at how the players are really really playing...the mark of a good teacher is someone who listens and evolves with the game and leads that evolution and you have that guy here today. First time I saw this my mouth dropped, my jaw dropped open, I go holy criminy! The more I thought about it, the more I watched these guys play, I watch these guys and that is exactly what he is talking about."
