= Cartwright Point, Ontario =

Cape and neighbourhood in Ontario, Canada

Coordinates: 44°13′52″N 76°26′51″W

Cartwright Point is a cape and neighbourhood in Kingston, Ontario, Canada. Located east of the city's downtown along the St. Lawrence River in the former Pittsburgh Township, it is bordered by Deadman Bay on its western side, and faces Wolfe Island on its southeastern side. Off the southern tip is Cedar Island and one of Kingston's four Martello Towers. Cartwright Point offers excellent views of the Thousand Islands and historic Fort Henry.

Cartwright Point is named for the Cartwright family who owned the land and rented it out on 100 year terms.
