= Wagoner Doctrine =

The Wagoner Doctrine is an American United States Court of Appeals for the Second Circuit legal principle applying the longstanding common law in pari delicto (roughly translated "in equal fault") rule in the bankruptcy setting.

Though controversial due to its willingness to bar recovery in what is typically considered an equitable proceeding (i.e., bankruptcy) and thus not well accepted in other circuits, Wagoner holds that "a claim against a third party for defrauding a corporation with the cooperation of corporate management accrues to the creditors, and not to the guilty corporation."

See in pari delicto for more information.
