= Eugenio Brunetta d'Usseaux =

Italian nobleman

- Count of Usseaux
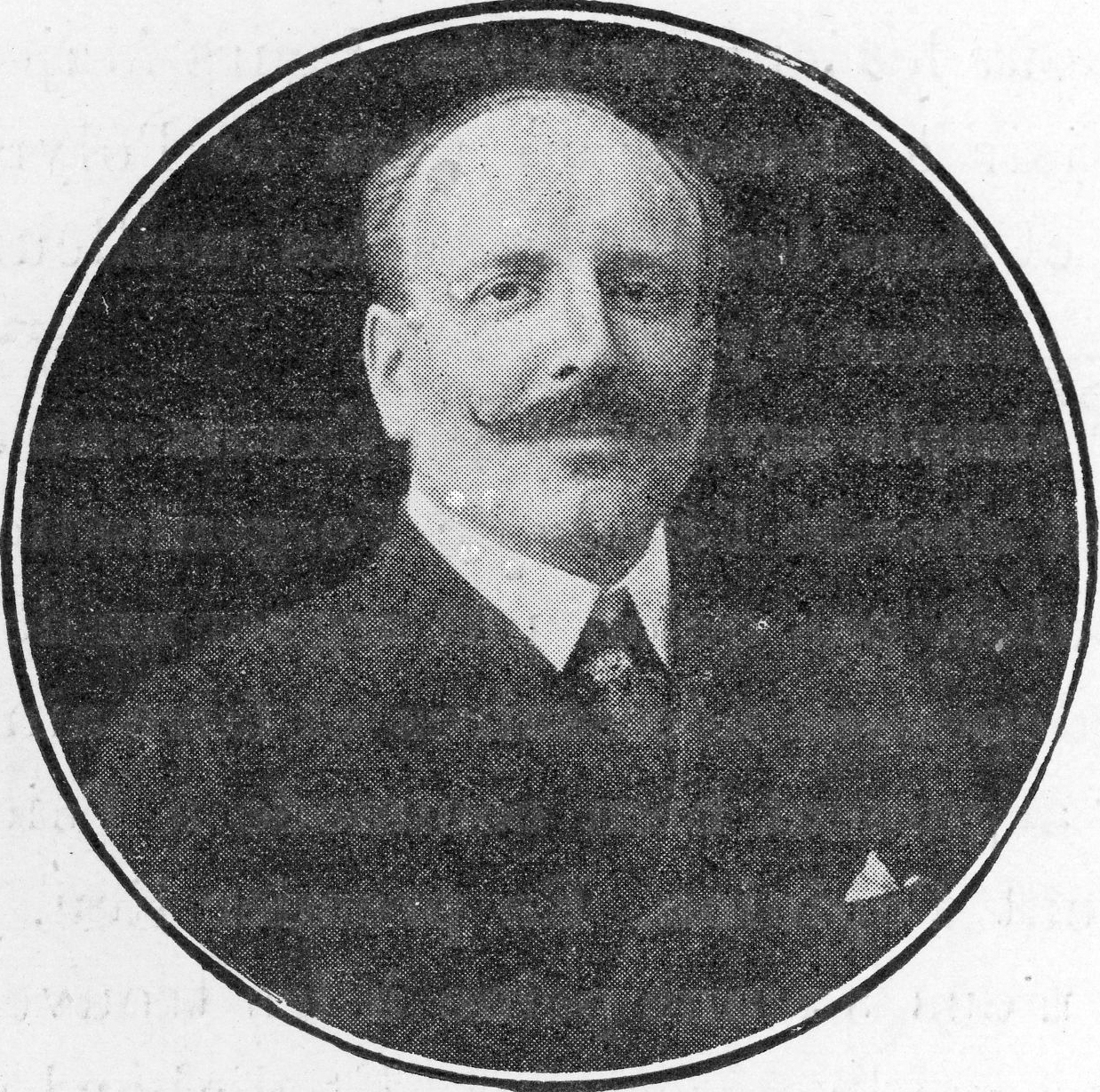
- Eugenio Brunetta d'Usseaux in 1909
- Born: 14 December 1857; Vercelli, Piedmont, Italy
- Died: 8 January 1919 (aged 61); France

Eugenio Brunetta d'Usseaux (14 December 1857 – 8 January 1919) was an Italian nobleman and member of the International Olympic Committee.

== Early life ==
Eugenio Brunetta d'Usseaux was born on the 14 December 1857, in Vercelli, and was educated in Turin. His father, the count Carlo Augusto Brunetta d'Usseaux was a high-ranking official of the Royal Sardinian Army, headquartered in the same city. His mother, Carolina Mattone di Benevello, also came from an Italian noble family, and was related to the family Valperga since seven centuries before, known for Boniface of Valperga.

At the end of his studies in the exclusive Nobles College located in the modern Academy of Science of Turin, Brunetta married Ekaterina Alexandrovna Zeyffart (1859-1897), a landowner of enormous plots in Ukraine, whose family had close ties to the Imperial family. The couple lived in Torino and in Paris.

== Sports ==
After the early death of his wife began devoting himself to sports organizing. Himself an active rower and rider, the count was very interested in sports, and was in Paris that he met with Baron Pierre de Coubertin interested to him, for the reinstatement of the Olympic Games. His engagement for the sports (ideals) was so very close to him, that in 1897 Brunetta d'Usseaux become member of the International Olympic Committee (IOC), which he remained until his death, as general secretary since 1902. Till the 21st century, he was the only Italian person recovering this charge.

He succeeded in bringing the 1908 Summer Olympics to Rome, but Italy had to forfeit the organization of the Olympics in 1906, due to financial and organisational problems. The 1908 Games were held in London instead. That same year, he tried to get winter sports on the Olympic programme, and suggested to have a separate winter sports week attached to the 1912 Summer Olympics in Stockholm. This was opposed by the Swedish organizers, but Brunetta d'Usseaux managed to get a winter sports week scheduled for 1916. Due to World War I, these Olympics were never organized.

== Death ==
The count died, under unclear circumstances, in France in 1919, and would not live to see the first Winter Olympic Games in 1924, maybe in Nice. At that time, he would to come in Russia for acknowledging the family of his wife, after the start of Russian Revolution.

He was appointed as Bailiff of Honour and Devotion of the Sovereign Military Order of Malta.
