= Wegner =

Wegner is a surname of German origin with the meaning 'wagon maker'. Alternative spellings are 'Wegener' and seldom 'Wägner' or 'Waegner'. The name Wagner has the same meaning. 'Wegner' may refer to:

== A ==
- Armin T. Wegner (1886–1978), German WWI soldier, writer, and human-rights activist
- Axel Wegner (born 1963), German sports shooter

== B ==
- Benjamin Wegner (1795–1864), Prussian-Norwegian industrialist, estate owner, and timber merchant
- Benjamin Wegner (civil servant) (1868–1949), Norwegian civil servant and lawyer
- Bernd Wegner (born 1949), German historian
- Bernd Wegner (mathematician) (1942–2024), German mathematician and editor-in-chief of zbMath
- Bettina Wegner (born 1947), German songwriter

== C ==
- Carl Wegner (born 1991), South African rugby player
- Carl O. Wegner (1897-1986), American lawyer and politician
- Christel Wegner (born 1947), German politician

== D ==
- Daniel Wegner (1948–2013), American experimental social psychologist
- Dennis Wegner (born 1991), German football player

== E ==
- Erwin Wegner (1909–1945), German athlete

== F ==
- Franz Wegner (born 1940), German theoretical physicist
- Fritz Wegner (1924–2015), Austrian-born British illustrator

== G ==
- Gary A. Wegner (born 1944), American astronomer
- Gudrun Wegner (1955–2005), German swimmer
- Gustav Wegner (1903–1942), German athlete

== H ==
- Hans Wegner (1914–2007), Danish furniture designer
- Henriette Wegner (1805–1875), Norwegian businesswoman and humanitarian leader
- Herman B. Wegner (1891–1964), American politician from Wisconsin

== J ==
- Jack Wegner (1913–1982), Australian footballer
- Josef W. Wegner (born 1967), American Egyptologist

== K ==
- Kai Wegner (born 1972), German politician
- Kurt Wegner (1908–1983), German artist

== L ==
- Leon Wegner (1824–1873), Polish economist and historian
- Lisa Wegner (born 1976), Canadian actress
- Lutz Michael Wegner (born 1949), German computer scientist

== M ==
- Mark Wegner (born 1972), American baseball umpire
- Max Wegner (born 1989), German football player

== O ==
- Oscar Wegner (born 1939), Argentine-born American tennis coach

== P ==
- Peter Wegner (computer scientist) (1932–2017), American computer scientist
- Peter Wegner (American artist) (born 1963)
- Peter Wegner (Australian artist)

== R ==
- Robert Wegner, Polish phantasy writer
- Rolf B. Wegner (born 1940), Norwegian lawyer and civil servant

== U ==
- Ulli Wegner (born 1942), German boxer and coach

== W ==
- Waldo Wegner (1913–2001), American basketball player
- Wilhelm Wegner (1914–1989), German soldier

== See also ==
- Brink-Wegner House
- Arne Wegner Haaland
- Christian Wegner Haaland
- Thomas Wegner Larsen Haaland
- Benjamin Wegner Nørregaard
- George Wegner Paus
- Wegener (disambiguation)
- Wegner (Norwegian family)
- Wegner Peak
