= Michael Wainwright (musician) =

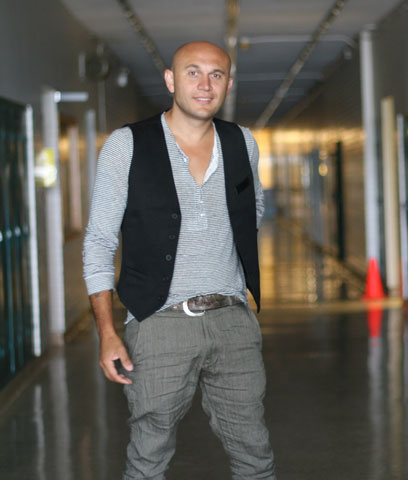
- Wainwright in 2011

Background information
- Born: Michael Wainwright; 6 March 1973 (age 53); Warrington, England
- Genres: Rock; Acoustic rock Folk rock
- Occupations: Singer-songwriter, guitarist
- Instruments: Vocals, guitar
- Years active: 2004–present
- Label: Town Records
- Website: www.michaelwainwright.ca

Michael Wainwright (born 6 March 1973) is an English singer-songwriter. He has released two albums, The Circus Is Coming To Town and Wainwright. He is the background vocalist and opening act for Tears For Fears.

== Early life ==
Wainwright was born in Warrington, England, relocating to Edson, Alberta, Canada before moving on to St. Catharines, Ontario, Canada, with his family as a young boy. He began playing guitar and writing songs when he was 10. He founded the band Flat Broke in high school with his brother.

== Career ==
Wainwright released his first 6-song EP in 2002. It was co-produced by Niagara Falls producer and studio owner Dean Malton at Groundloop Productions. The track "Radio On" placed second out of 5,000 entries in Toronto's Mix 99.9 13th annual songwriting competition.

In 2004, Wainwright met producer Charlton Pettus, of Tears for Fears, and began recording songs which eventually became the album Wainwright, released in February 2008 on Town Records. The album featured guest musicians including Russ Irwin of Aerosmith on keyboards, Curt Smith of Tears for Fears on vocals, and Fred Eltringham of The Wallflowers and Dixie Chicks on drums, as well as guest singer-songwriter Gaby Moreno on two tracks. The album was mastered by Ted Jensen at Sterling Sound and the album artwork was created by Alan Aldridge. In May 2008, Wainwright started his "Guitar and a Car" tour, which went to Canada and the United States, then in October of the same year to the United Kingdom.

Through Pettus, he met and established a relationship with Curt Smith and Roland Orzabal. In 2009, Smith announced that Wainwright would open for the group on most of its 2009 West Coast tour dates. Since then, Wainwright has toured with Tears For Fears as their opening act and backing vocalist at most of their shows, including the 2010 Asia Tour, 2010 East Coast Tour and 2011 West Coast, Mexico and South American Tour.

September 2011 saw the release of Wainwright's second album The Circus Is Coming To Town. The album was once again produced by Charlton Pettus of Town Records. All songs were written in collaboration between Wainwright and Pettus with the exception of "Heart-Shaped Man", which was written by Roland Orzabal. Contributors to the album included Charlton Pettus, Roland Orzabal, and Holly Palmer on vocals. The CD was illustrated and designed by Canadian designer Cassie Randall.

== Discography ==
- EP (2004)
- Wainwright (2008)
- The Circus Is Coming To Town (2011)

=== Contributions ===
- 2007: Contributed three songs to the soundtrack of Moving McAllister: "Across the World", "World To Bring Me Down", and "Can’t Believe My Eyes".
- 2008 "Can't Believe My Eyes" was licensed by EA sports for the video game The Sims 2: Apartment Life.
- 2008 "Across The World" was licensed by NBC's show Las Vegas for its DVD release.
- 2010 "Last Goodbye" was licensed by Spike TV's Blue Mountain State in its Season 1, Episode 8 (Ep 108)

=== Guest vocals ===
- 2007: Backing vocals for Los Angeles-based band The Sleeping Masses, fronted by lead singer Patrick Muldoon.
- 2008: Guest vocalist on Elvis Stojko's solo album

== Awards ==
- 2008 Niagara Music Award "Best Male Vocalist"
