= Justice Wainwright =

Justice Wainwright may refer to:

- George L. Wainwright Jr. (born 1943), associate justice of the North Carolina Supreme Court
- Dale Wainwright (born 1961), justice of the Texas Supreme Court
