= Wainwright (occupation) =

One who makes or repairs wagons and carts

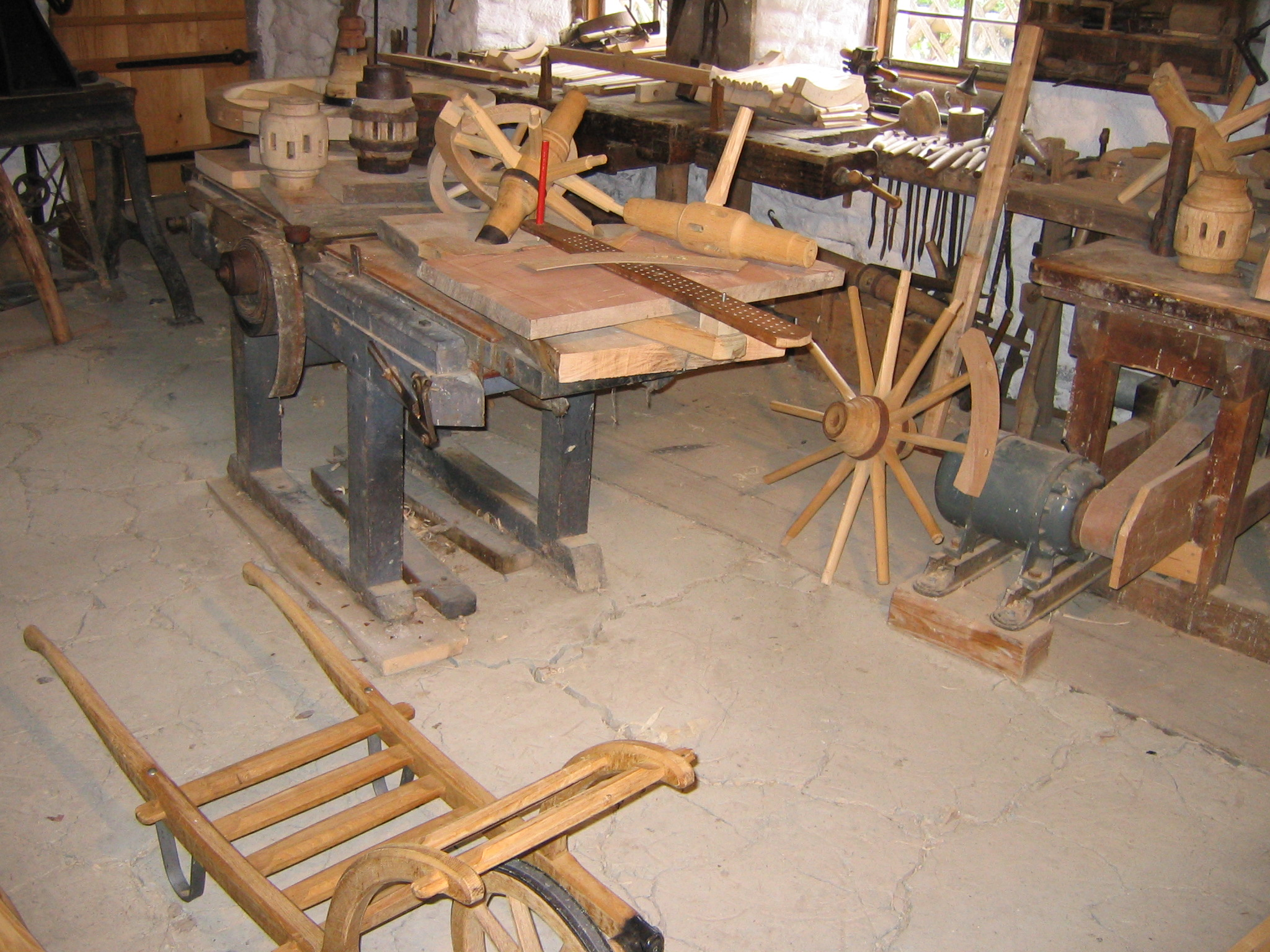
A wainwright's workshop

A wainwright or cartwright is a trades person skilled in the making and repairing of wagons and carts. The word wainwright is the combination of the archaic words "wain" (a large wagon for farm use) and "wright" (a worker or maker), originating from the Old English wægnwyrhta. A master wainwright employs several craftsmen, including wheelwrights, blacksmiths and painters.

A carriagemaker specializes in making carriages.

== See also ==
- Carriagemaker
- Carter (name)
- Coachbuilder
