= Đoko Pavićević =

Yugoslav Montenegrin military leader, participant in Second World War

- Ђорђије Павићевић
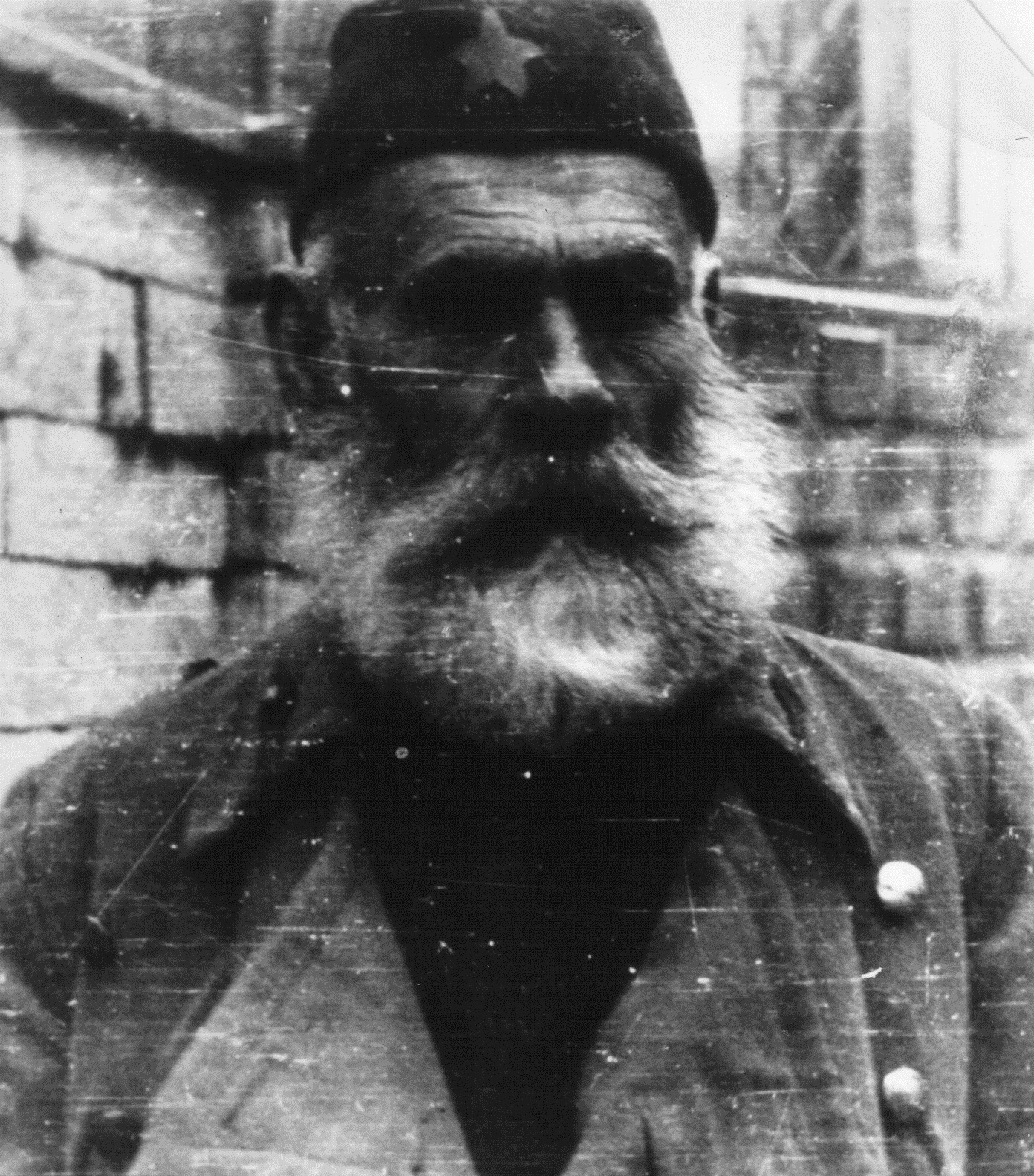
- Pavićević during World War II
- Born: 6 May 1872; Do Pješivački near Danilovgrad, Montenegro
- Died: 4 June 1970 (aged 98); Nikšić, SR Montenegro, SFR Yugoslavia
- Military career
- Allegiance: Principality of Montenegro; Kingdom of Yugoslavia; Democratic Federal Yugoslavia
- Branch: Royal Montenegrin Army (1906–1916); Royal Yugoslav Army (1919–1923); Yugoslav Partisans (1941–1945); Yugoslav Army (1945)
- Service years: 1906–1916; 1919–1923; 1941–1945
- Rank: Colonel
- Conflicts: World War I; Montenegrin campaign; Serbian Campaign; World War II in Yugoslavia: Uprising in Montenegro
- Awards: Order of the People's Hero

Đorđije "Đoko" Pavićević (Serbian Cyrillic: Ђорђије "Ђоко" Павићевић; 6 May 1872 – 4 June 1970) was an officer of the Royal Montenegrin Army and Royal Yugoslav Army who fought in World War I and in World War II as a member of the Yugoslav Partisans, and later a colonel of Yugoslav People's Army. He was the oldest recipient of the Order of the People's Hero.

== Biography ==
Pavićević was born on 6 May 1872 in Do Pješivački, near Danilovgrad and came from an old Montenegrin military family. He became literate late, so it was not until 1906 that he enrolled in military school. As an officer and supporter of Janko Vukotić, he came into conflict with the Minister of War, Mitar Martinović, which is why he spent almost a year in prison under accusation that he was the opponent of King Nicholas. After the Balkan Wars, he though about joining the Royal Serbian Army, however, he named commander of the border company in Đakovica. During World War I, as part of the Sandžak Army, during 1914 and 1915, he participated in the Serbian-Montenegrin offensive in Bosnia. During the Austro-Hungarian occupation of Montenegro, he was interned in Hungary, where he remained in a prison camp until the end of the war.

As a supporter of the Serbian-Montenegrin unionism, he joined the new Royal Yugoslav Army, but in 1923 he retired at his own request. Until the beginning of the World War II, he lived in the village of Mokri Do, near Nikšić.

During the Uprising in Montenegro against the Italian occupation, together with four children - two sons and two daughters, at the age of 69, he entered the fight. He stood out as an old warrior in the fall of 1941, when, after the uprising subsided, he joined the Yugoslav Partisans along with his two sons. From the end of 1942, he was an advisor to the commander of the Third Strike Division, as well as a councilor at the First Session of AVNOJ and a member of ZAVNO of Montenegro and Boka. He was admitted to the membership of the Communist Party of Yugoslavia in September 1943. The writer Vladimir Nazor called him the oldest Yugoslav Partisan.

After the end of the war, he was demobilized as a colonel, and for some time he was the president of the District Board of the Unitary National Liberation Front (NOF) in Nikšić and a member of the Main Board of the NOF of Montenegro. He was elected a Member of the National Assembly of Montenegro. His older son Vojislav died in the war, and the younger Branko was the first president of the Montenegrin Academy of Sciences and Arts. He was the holder of the Commemorative Medal of the Partisans of 1941, and was awarded the Order of the People's Hero on 27 November 1953, at the age of 81, as the oldest holder of this decoration.

Pavićević died on 4 June 1970 at the age of 98.

== Bibliography ==
- Narodni heroji Jugoslavije vol. 3. Belgrade: Narodna knjiga. 1982. COBISS 48703239
- Koprivica, Andrija (1964). Najstariji partizan Jugoslavije — Narodni heroj Đoko Pavićević. Belgrade: Prosveta. COBISS 130334471
- Vojna enciklopedija vol. 3. Belgrade. 1973. COBISS 168834823
