= Siege of Scutari (1912–1913) =

Battle during the First Balkan War

- Part of the First Balkan War
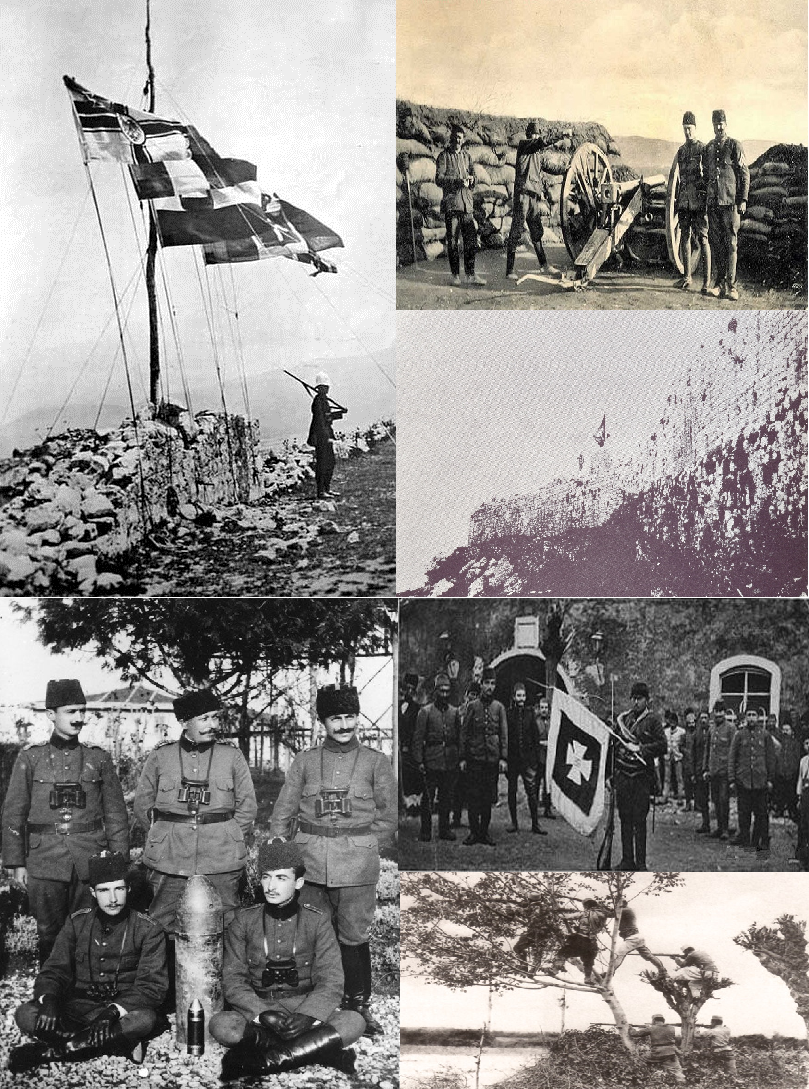
- Clockwise from top left: Flags of Great Powers on Shkodër fortress; Ottoman troops defending Shkodra; Montenegrin flag flying over the Shkoder fortress; Captured flag standard of Montenegrin forces proudly displayed by Turkish and Albanian troops; Albanian guerillas shooting from a tree; Albanian officers posing with captured Montenegrin ammunition
Date	28 October 1912 – 23 April 1913
Location	Near Scutari, Scutari Province, Ottoman Empire (Note: As the capital of the Ottoman Vilayet of Scutari this city was in the hands of the Turks until April 1913.) (present-day Shkodër, Albania)
Result	Montenegrin–Serbian victory

Belligerents
Ottoman Empire; Albanian volunteers and irregulars	Montenegro; Serbia

Commanders and leaders
(Ottoman Empire) Hasan Rıza Pasha X Monsignor Sereqi; Alush Lohja; Ahmet Zogu; Essad Pasha (surrendered)	(Kingdom of Montenegro) King Nikola (Kingdom of Montenegro) Crown Prince Danilo (Kingdom of Montenegro) Radomir Vešović (Kingdom of Montenegro) Mitar Martinović (Kingdom of Serbia) Damjan Popović (WIA)

Units involved
Hasan Riza Bey's army: (Turkey) Scutari Corps; Esad Toptani's army: Redif Unit; Tuzi unit; Central Albania volunteers; Ahmet Zogu's army: Matjane tribesmen; Bashibazuk	Montenegrin army: (Kingdom of Montenegro) Zeta Division; (Kingdom of Montenegro) Coastal Division; Serbian army: (Kingdom of Serbia) Third Serbian Army; (Kingdom of Yugoslavia) South Slav Volunteers; Catholic Malësorës

Strength
20,000; Breakdown: 13,600 men and 96 guns in the Scutari corps; 10,000 volunteers from Central Albania; 3,750 soldiers in Tuza; 2,000 Matjane tribesmen; 2,000 bashibazuk	40,000–50,000; Breakdown: 15,000 men and 40 guns in the Zeta division; 8,000 men and 34 guns in the Coastal division; Initially 500 South Slav volunteers increased to 4,500; 3,000 Albanian volunteers

Casualties and losses
A few hundred	Montenegro: 9,438 total casualties; 2,836 killed; 6,602 wounded; 462 died from disease

The siege of Scutari, also referred to as the siege of Shkodër (Albanian: Rrethimi i Shkodrës, Serbian: Опсада Скадра), known in Turkish as İşkodra Müdafaası (in Turkish) or İşkodra Savunması , took place from 28 October 1912 to 23 April 1913 when the army of the Kingdom of Montenegro defeated the forces of the Ottoman Empire and captured Shkodër.

== Background ==
In 1912, the Balkan League consisting of Serbia, Montenegro, Greece and Bulgaria had jointly declared war against the Ottoman Empire. Montenegro mobilized its troops and prepared to attack the Ottoman forces in Albania directly to the south. Behind the invasion, however, stood Montenegro's intention to expand its border at the expense of territories with an overwhelming majority of Albanians. Montenegro considered itself the successor of Zeta, a medieval Slavic realm, with Shkodër as its capital. With the transition of power from the last feudal lords Balšići or Balsha to Venetians, and eventually Ottomans, who established a city as an administrative center of the region, the "lost capital" became a symbol of oppression for the Montenegrins.

== Start of the war ==
On 8 October 1912, Turkish General Hasan Riza Pasha announced that Montenegro had declared war on the Ottoman Empire in order to erase 600 years of oppression by the "Turkish foot", as the enemy claimed, and that its troops were crossing the border between Montenegro and Albania. Two hours after the news, the Montenegrin troops, as expected, approached Scutari. As much as 70% of the Turkish army in the interior of the Balkans was composed of Muslim Albanians conscripted during the freedom struggle from the Ottoman Empire. At noon, Hasan Riza Pasha gathered all his commanders in his headquarters and told them:

The city will soon be surrounded, but this city will not fall into the hands of Montenegrins. Shkodra is our fate or our grave, but not our shame. Today we have five thousand troops, but over 20 thousand others are coming to our assistance. As of today begins an uphill battle, that none of us knows how long it will last

— Hasan Riza Pasha, during the organisation of the defence of Scutari,

== Siege ==
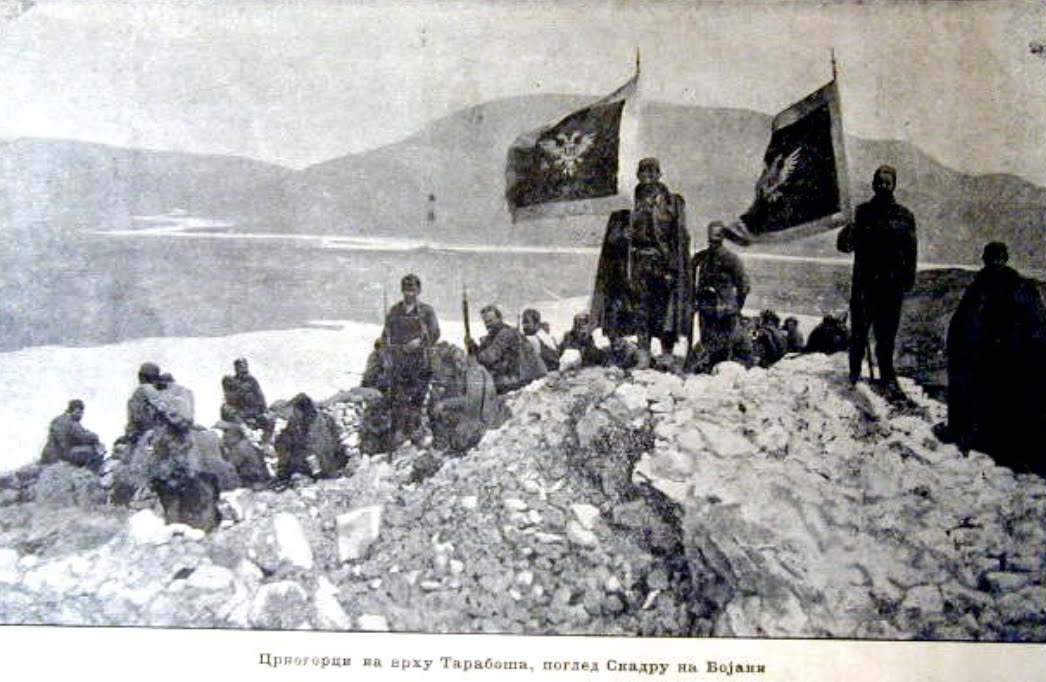
Montenegrin soldier on the Tarabosh near Shkodër

The siege of Scutari was initiated by the Montenegrins on 28 October 1912. The initial attack was carried out by the Montenegrin army under the command of Prince Danilo and encountered stiff resistance. As the conflict settled into siege warfare, the Montenegrins were supported by reinforcements from their Serbian allies. Radomir Vešović, a Montenegrin army officer participated in the siege where he was wounded twice, for which he earned a golden Obilić Medal and the nickname the knight of Brdanjolt (Serbian: витез од Брдањолта).(Serbian: витез од Брдањолта).

The Turkish and Albanian defenders of Scutari were led by Hasan Riza Pasha and his lieutenant, Essad Pasha. After the siege had continued for approximately three months, differences between the two Ottoman leaders boiled over on 30 January 1913, when Essad Pasha had two of his Albanian servants ambush and kill Riza Pasha. The ambush occurred as Riza Pasha left Essad's house after a dinner engagement and put Essad Pasha in total control of the Turkish forces at Scutari. Differences between the two men centered about the continued defense of the city. Riza Pasha desired to continue the fight against the Montenegrins and Serbs while Essad Pasha was a proponent of ending the siege by means of secret negotiations conducted with the counsel of the Russians. Essad Pasha's plan was to deliver Scutari to the Montenegrins and Serbs as the price for their support in his attempt to proclaim himself King of Albania.

The siege, however, continued and even escalated in February when King Nikola of Montenegro received a delegation of Malësian Albanian chieftains who stated their allegiance to him and volunteered to join the Montenegrin forces with 3,000 of their own soldiers. Shortly thereafter, the Malësian Albanian chieftains joined the war by assisting in the attack of the Jubani — Daut-age tower. (Note: On that occasion, the Malësians requested that they be allowed to join with the Montenegrin army in the capture of Shkodra.)

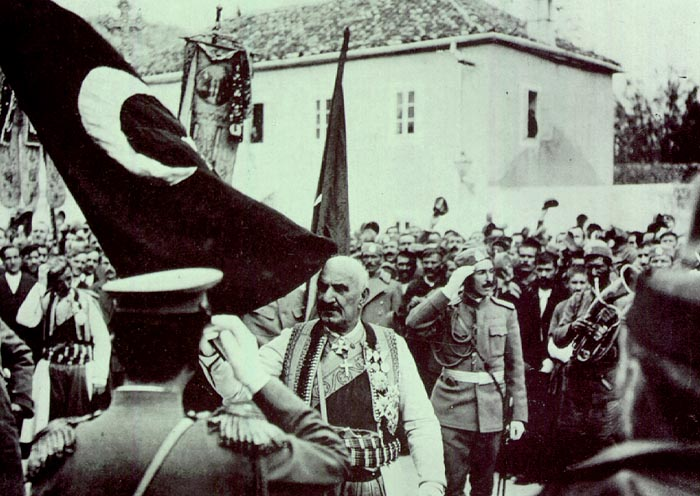
Ottoman flag surrendered to Montenegrin King Nicholas

As Montenegro continued their siege in April, the Great Powers decided to implement a blockade of their ports, which was declared on 10 April and lasted until 14 May 1913. On 21 April 1913 approximately six months after the start of the siege, Essad Pasha offered an official proposal to surrender the city to Montenegrin General Vukotic. On 23 April, Essad Pasha's proposal was accepted and he was allowed to leave the city with full military honors and all of his troops and equipment, except the heavy guns. He also received a sum of £10,000 sterling from the Montenegrin King.

Essad Pasha surrendered Scutari to Montenegro only after its destiny had been decided, meaning after the Great Powers had forced Serbia to retreat and after it was obvious that the Great Powers would not allow Montenegro to keep Scutari. At the same time, Essad Pasha managed to get the support of Serbia and Montenegro for the new Kingdom of Albania, which would gain Scutari indirectly by the Great Powers.

During their retreat the Montenegrin army set fire to the Grand Bazaar burning 250 shops.

== Aftermath ==
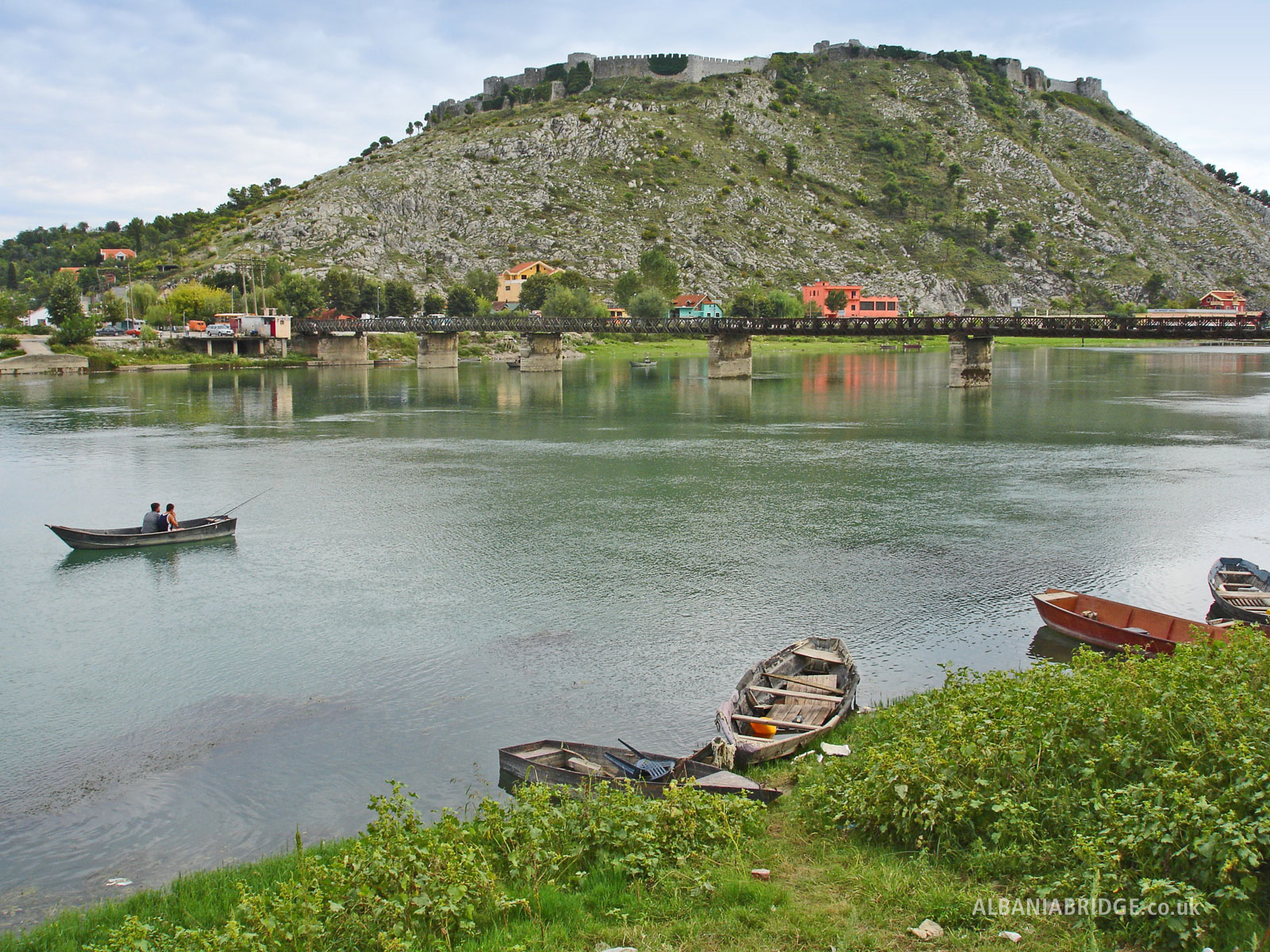
The Shkodër fortress

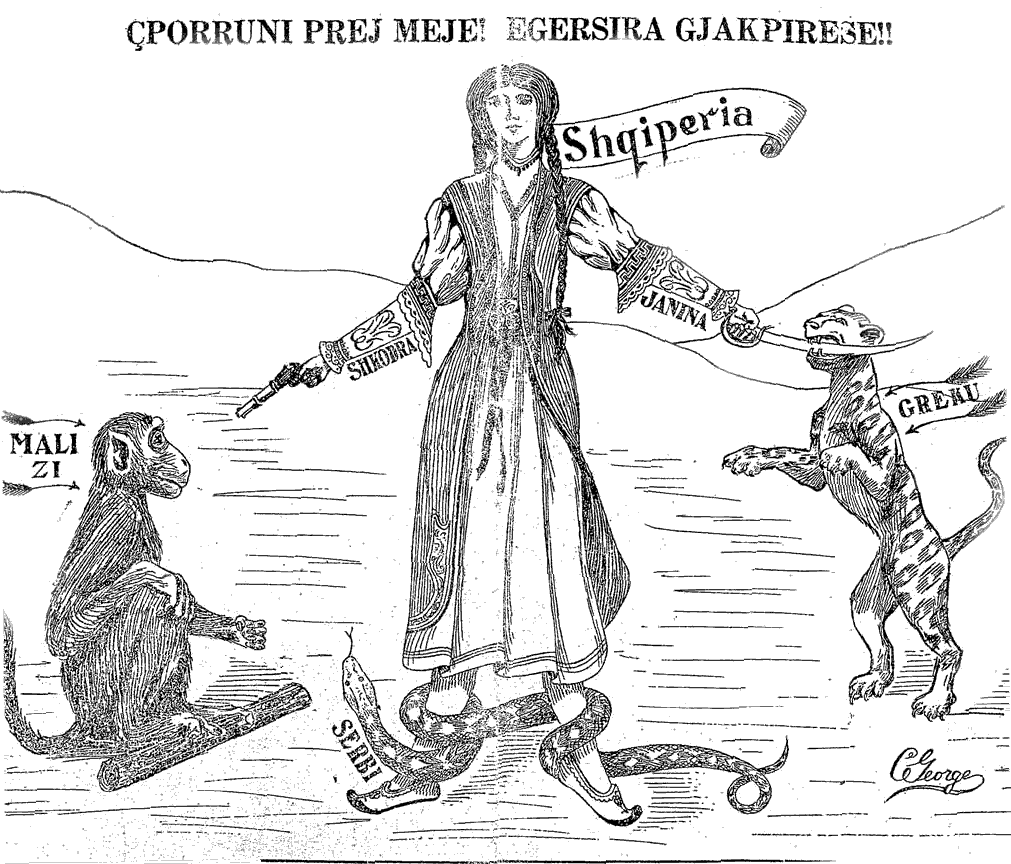
Caricature shows Albania defending itself from neighboring countries. Montenegro is represented as a monkey, Greece as a leopard and Serbia as a snake. Text in Albanian: "Flee from me! Bloodsucker Beasts!"

The capture of Scutari by Montenegro and Serbia removed the only obstacle to a Serbian advance into Ottoman Albania. By November 1912, Albania had declared independence but was yet to be recognized by anyone. The Serbian army eventually occupied most of northern and central Albania, stopping north of the town of Vlorë. The Serbians also managed to trap the remains of the Vardar Army in what was left of Albania proper, but were unable to force them to surrender.

When the war was over, however, the Great Powers did not award Scutari to the Kingdom of Montenegro, rather in accordance with the London Conference of Ambassadors compelled the Montenegrins to evacuate the city in May 1913. The Montenegrin army's withdrawal was hastened by a small naval flotilla of British and Italian gunboats that moved up the Buna/Bojana River and across the Adriatic coastline. An international peace keeping force (Scutari detachment) from five countries including Austria-Hungary, Great Britain, France, Italy and Germany was deployed in the city and kept until the start of World War I.

The International reaction to the ultimate settlement was somewhat mixed. Austria-Hungary's Foreign Minister, Count Leopold Berchtold, demanded that Scutari be evacuated by the Great Powers within 48 hours. The Kingdom of Italy supported Austria-Hungary and sent a part of the peace force. The Russian Empire supported Montenegro in its efforts to keep Scutari.

And finally as cultural outcomes of the siege, Albanian novelist Ndoc Nikaj wrote an historical novel titled Shkodra e rrethueme ("Shkodra under siege") in 1913 while Bosnian Serb poet Aleksa Šantić wrote To Essad Pasha (Serbian: Esad Paši), inspired by the siege of Scutari.

== See also ==
- Serbia in the Balkan Wars
- Massacres of Albanians in the Balkan Wars
