= Royal Montenegrin Army =

Royal Montenegrin Army Army of Kingdom of Montenegro
- Војска Краљевине Црне Горе; Vojska Kraljevine Crne Gore
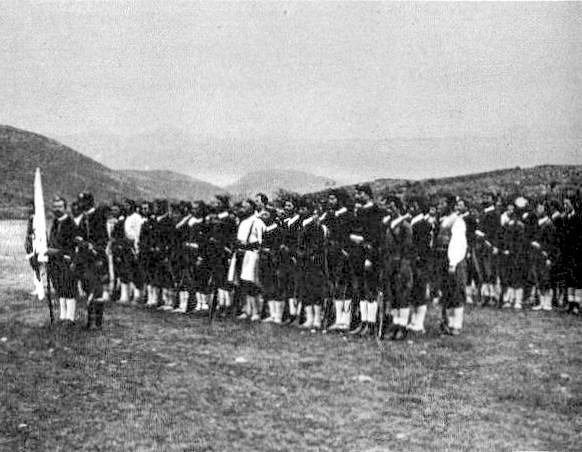
- Montenegrin troops in October 1914
- Active: 28 August 1910
- Disbanded: 26 November 1918
- Country: Kingdom of Montenegro
- Allegiance: Nicholas I of Montenegro
- Branch: Land army
- Type: Infantry and artillery
- Role: Defend Montenegro
- Size: +44,000 soldiers (on 28 August 1910); 44,500 soldiers (on First Balkan War); 12,800 soldiers (on Second Balkan War); 50,000 soldiers (on WW1 and Montenegrin campaign); 45-50,000 soldiers (on 1914 Serbian campaign); 48,300 soldiers (on 1915 Serbian campaign)
- Colors: Pan-Slavic colors
- Engagements: First Balkan War; Second Balkan War; 1914 Serbian campaign 1915 Serbian campaign Montenegrin campaign World War One

Commanders
- Supreme commander: Nicholas I of Montenegro
- Deputy commander-in-chief: Prince Danilo of Montenegro
- Chief of Montenegrin Supreme Command: Božidar Janković (1914-1915); Petar Pešić (1915-1916)
- Deputy Chief of the General Staff: Petar Pešić (1914-1915)
- Chief of the General Staff: Janko Vukotić
- Inspector of the General Staff: Minister of War of Kingdom of Montenegro
- Commander: President of the Ministerial Council of Kingdom of Montenegro
- Notable commanders: Janko Vukotić; Andrija Radović; Mitar Martinović; Anto Gvozdenović; Milutin Vučinić; Radomir Vešović; Krsto Popović; Milo Matanović; Petar Pešić; Božidar Janković; Mašan Božović; Đoko Pavićević

The Royal Montenegrin Army (in Serbian/Montenegrin: Војска Краљевине Црне Горе; Vojska Kraljevine Crne Gore), or the Army of the Kingdom of Montenegro, was the army of the Kingdom of Montenegro.

== Creation of the army ==
The creation of Royal Montenegrin Army succeeded on 28 August 1910, during the proclamation of Kingdom of Montenegro, Nicholas I of Montenegro became king and commander-in-chief of the new army as well as the Prime Minister of Kingdom of Montenegro as commander and the Minister of Defence of Kingdom of Montenegro as the Division General of the Army. A year passed and along with Serbia, Greece and Bulgaria founded the Balkan League, a military alliance to remove the Ottoman dominion on the Balkans.

== Montenegro in the Balkan Wars ==
=== First Balkan War ===
The Kingdom of Montenegro was the first country in the league to declare war to the Ottoman Empire. The war started with Montenegrin forces attacking the Ottoman city of Novi Pazar to liberate to the Christians harshly treated by the Ottomans. The Montenegrin Army was controlled under the Nicholas and, commanded by the Prince Danilo and Peter, both Nicholas I of Montenegro's sons, and the generals Janko Vukotič and Mitar Martinović. Although Montenegro was the smallest country of the Balkan Peninsula, its military power was incredible for its size.

Montenegro had a very small professional army, being the smallest Balkan army. The army used machine guns, artillery pieces and cannons, and lacked any sort of cavalry. Most of the country's citizens were soldiers or army officers Although it had few battalions, its casualties were serious, losing about of its 50% men. In the aftermath 2,836 men were killed, 6,602 were wounded and 406 died of disease or other combat related illnesses.

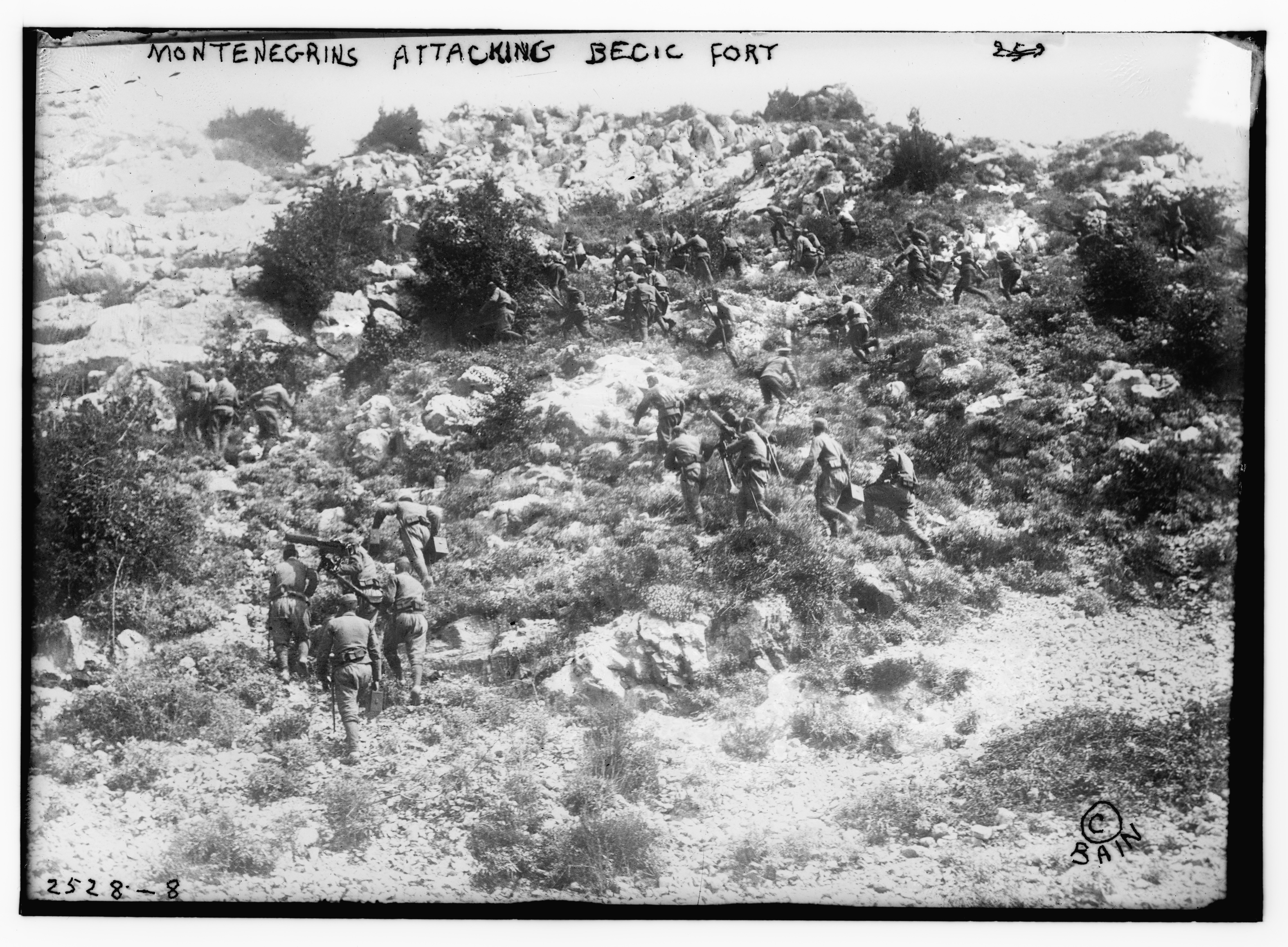
Montenegrin soldiers attacking Decic Fortress

=== Second Balkan War ===
Montenegro gained the eastern part of Kosovo, Metohija, except the area of Prizren, which was gained by Serbia. However, it did not receive the region of Shkodër which they had desired after eight months of continuous siege. Bulgaria accused Serbia of conquering territories not proposed in the treaty and thus Bulgaria declared war on Serbia, starting the Second Balkan War. Montenegro (still allied with Serbia) sent 12,800 men to assist with the war effort. Under the command of Nicholas and Prince Danilo and general Janko Vukotić. The Bulgarian Army surrendered in less than a month and only lost 1% of its men, suffering only 1,201 casualties; 241 killed and 961 wounded.

== Montenegro in the First World War ==
On 28 July 1914, the heir of the Austro-Hungarian throne, the archduke Franz Ferdinand of Austria and his wife, Sophie Chotek, were assassinated by a Bosnian Serb nationalist, Gavrilo Princip. Austria-Hungary sent an ultimatum to Serbia telling them that they were responsible for the assassination. Serbia accepted all the terms but one which allowed Austro-Hungarian police. The reason for this is because they said it denied their right as a sovereign nation. Thus Austria-Hungary declared war on Serbia. Russia (self-proclaimed protector of all Slavs, principally to Serbia and Montenegro) declared war on Austria-Hungary in defence of the Balkan Slavs. The German Empire, an ally of Austria-Hungary, declared war on Russia. France (which was an ally of Russia) declared war on the German Empire, starting the First World War. Nicholas decided to maintain the neutrality because his country was recovering from the Balkan Wars and the army wasn't prepared to affront Austria-Hungary, a superpower with 10 times more men in their respective armed forces. The Austro-Hungarian army wasn't very prepared, equipped or trained compared to both Serbia and Montenegro, both of which fought in the Balkan wars in previous years. Austria-Hungary had a massive population being 100 times more. But the Serbian population of Montenegro supported the Serbian war effort and pressured Montenegro to enter the war. Montenegro would enter the war on the 6th of August 1914.

=== Montenegro during Serbian campaign of 1914 ===
Montenegro mobilized 45–50,000 men of the royal army along with 62 batteries, 14 land cannons and 62 machine guns. Together with 427,597 men of the Royal Serbian Army, they added 465–470,597 men versus 500,000 men of the Austro-Hungarian Army. The Austro-Hungarians were defeated in December 1914 with half of its forces being lost. Serbia also suffered heavy losses losing 75% of its men. Montenegro lost less than 15% of its army only losing 13,000.

==== Militarization on Serbian campaign of 1914 ====
Type	Austria-Hungary	Serbia + Montenegro (total)
Battalion	329	209
Battery	200	122 + 62 (184)
Squadron	51	44
Engineering companies	50	30
Land cannon	1243	718 + 14 (732)
Machine guns	490	315 + 62 (377)
Total soldiers	500.000	420.597 + 45–50.000 (465-470.597)

=== Montenegro in the fall of his ally Serbia ===
The Montenegrin army continued to number 48,300, meaning that of the 50,000 soldiers, 1,700 were killed or wounded, a loss of less than 4%. The Serbian army, on the other hand, numbered 420,597 soldiers, but suffered during the 1914 campaign of the same name, losing more than 40% of its army, ending up with 260,000 soldiers. Austria-Hungary, along with Serbia, suffered the most, losing more than 40% of its 500,000 men. The Austro-Hungarians did not move from the Serbian border in the first months of 1915. It would not be until the Balkan loser, Bulgaria, who entered the scene and joined the Central Powers (because it lost territory to Serbia during the Second Balkan War), along with Germany, sending extra men to the Balkan front. Bulgaria mobilized 300,000 troops alongside the German-Austro-Hungarians, another 300,000, against a total of 308,300 Serbo-Montenegrin troops (48,300 from the Montenegrin army and 260,000 from the Serbian army). Serbia fell in less than a month, dividing Austria-Hungary and Bulgaria.

Montenegro would be the only Balkan country not conquered by the Bulgarian-German-Austro-Hungarian combinated invasion, but it was not short-lived from late 1915 to early 1916. The Montenegrin army lost 23,000 men, the majority (13,000) killed, and the remaining 10,000 wounded or missing, with losses reaching 63%.

=== Invasion of Montenegro and the capture of the army ===
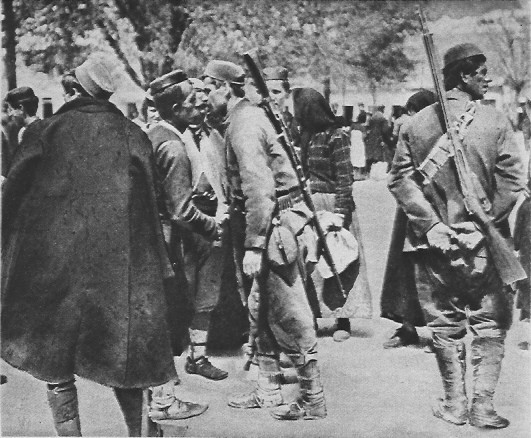
Montenegrin soldiers leaving home to fight in mount Lovćen.

The Montenegrin army expanded its personnel to 50,000 men for a possible Austro-Hungarian or Bulgarian invasion. King Nicholas fled the country and ceded all his power to Janko Vukotić as Chief of Staff of the Montenegrin High Command. Austria-Hungary planned the invasion of Montenegro in early January 1916, and it began on January 5, 1916, with 100,000 Austro-Hungarian troops against 50,000 Montenegrins. The Austro-Hungarians outnumbered the Montenegrins, thus initiating the Montenegrin military campaign. The Montenegrin army was supported by the Serbian army, which was retreating to Serbia after the invasion, and by French artillery. The Austro-Hungarians started off on the wrong foot, attempting to take the village of Mojkovac with 20,000 men, initiating the Battle of the same name, in which they were defeated by 6,500 Montenegrins, meaning the Austro-Hungarians outnumbered the Montenegrins at least four times as many. The Montenegrin army won the first battle on its territory, with the Battle of Mojkovac being a Montenegrin battle with fewer casualties than in previous battles, with 200 dead and fewer than 700 wounded. The Montenegrin army won the Battle of Mojkovac, but due to its small size, they were unable to push back the Austro-Hungarian army, capturing Cetinje within a week and the entire country within two weeks, along with Shkodër. The Montenegrin army, along with its leader, Janko Vukotić, was imprisoned until the end of the war.
