= Sardars of Bengal =

Disambiguation page

Sardar
- Pronunciation: Shordar
- Language: Bengali

Origin
- Origin: Persian
- Region of origin: Bengal

Other names
- Alternative spelling: Sarder

Sardar (Bengali: সরদার) is a hereditary Bengali surname for village or area leader. It may refer to:

- Sardars of Dacca
  - Pearu Sardar (1911–1961)
- Dr. Mohammad Lutfur Rahman Sardar (1889–1936), social worker and litterateur
- Ahmed Ali Sardar (1910–1980), politician
- Shamsur Rahman Sardar (1915–2008), politician
- Sarder Jayenuddin (1918–1986), novelist
- Sardar Fazlul Karim (1925–2014), politician
- Ayesha Sardar (1927–1988), politician
- Tabibar Rahman Sarder (1932–2010), freedom fighter and politician
- Sardar Amjad Hossain (1940–2015), minister and academic
- Abdul Bari Sardar (1943–2021), politician
- Abdul Wadud Sardar (born 1945), politician
- Sardar Md. Sakhawat Husain (born 1951), Minister for Health and Family Welfare
- Sardar Nurul Amin (born 1969), Chief of Special Branch Police
- Md. Abdul Bari Sarder (born 1970), politician and physician
- Sardar Md. Rashed Jahangir (born 1972), Justice of the High Court
- Zahurul Haque Sardar, parliamentarian
- Sardar AKM Nasiruddin, politician
- Shahnaz Sardar, politician
- Sardar Abdur Rashid, parliamentarian
- Jahurul Haque Sardar, politician
- Sardar Sarfuddin Ahmed, politician
- Sirajul Islam Sarder, politician
- Salahuddin Sardar, parliamentarian

== See also ==
- Akhand (surname)
- Biswas
- Kazis of Bengal
- Khondakar
- Mridha
- Patwary
- Sikdar
