= Siege of Shkoder =

The siege of Shkoder may refer to:

- The siege of Shkodra (known also as the siege of Scutari) in 1478–79, a siege by Ottoman forces upon the Venetian-controlled Albanian fortress at Shkodra.
- The siege of Shkodra (known also as the siege of Scutari) in 1912–13, a siege by predominantly Montenegrin forces upon the Ottoman-controlled Albanian fortress at Shkodra.

Note: The city called Shkodra has been known by many names throughout history: Shkodra, Shkodër, Skadar, and Scutari are the most common. The current English (and Albanian) spelling is Shkodra. Shkodër is the indefinite nominative form of the name in Albanian, and is sometimes written as Shkoder in English. Scutari was the old Italian and Venetian name for the city. Skadar is the Serbian and Montenegrin name, and is also used in reference to the neighbouring lake.
