= Md. Abul Kalam Azad (Khulna politician) =

Bangladeshi politician

- মোঃ আবুল কালাম আজাদ

Member of the Bangladesh Parliament for Khulna-6
- Incumbent
- Assumed office 17 February 2026
- Preceded by: Md. Rashiduzzaman

Personal details
- Born: November 4, 1966 (age 60)q Koyra Upazila, Khulna District
- Party: Bangladesh Jamaat-e-Islami

Md. Abul Kalam Azad is a Bangladeshi politician of the Bangladesh Jamaat-e-Islami. He is currently serving as a member of parliament from Khulna-6.

== Early life ==
Azad was born on 4 November 1966 in Koyra Upazila in Khulna District.
