= Akhteruzzaman Babu =

Bangladeshi politician

- আখতারুজ্জামান বাবু

Member of the Bangladesh Parliament for Khulna-6
- In office 20 February 2019 – 29 January 2024
- Preceded by: Sheikh Md. Nurul Haque
- Succeeded by: Md. Rashiduzzaman

Personal details
- Born: 11 August 1968 (age 58) Khulna, East Pakistan, Pakistan
- Party: Bangladesh Awami League
- Education: BA

Akhteruzzaman Babu (born 11 August 1968) is a Bangladesh Awami League politician and the incumbent Jatiya Sangsad member representing the Khulna-6.

== Early life ==
Babu was born on 11 August 1968 in Goroikhali, Paikgachha Upazila. His father was a school teacher. He spent his childhood in Paikgacha and later he moved in Khulna town.

== Career ==
Babu is a former member of the Bangladesh Parliament and a member of the Science and Technology Parliamentary Committee. Babu was elected to parliament from Khulna-6 (Koyra-Paickgacha) as a Bangladesh Awami League candidate on 30 December 2018. Before that, He held different responsible posts in Bangladesh Awami Jubo League at Khulna District, former general secretary of Khulna District Chatra League. Besides his political portfolio, He is the owner of M/S Jaman Enterprise.
