= Danilo, Crown Prince of Montenegro =

Danilo Petrović-Njegoš
- Crown Prince of Montenegro
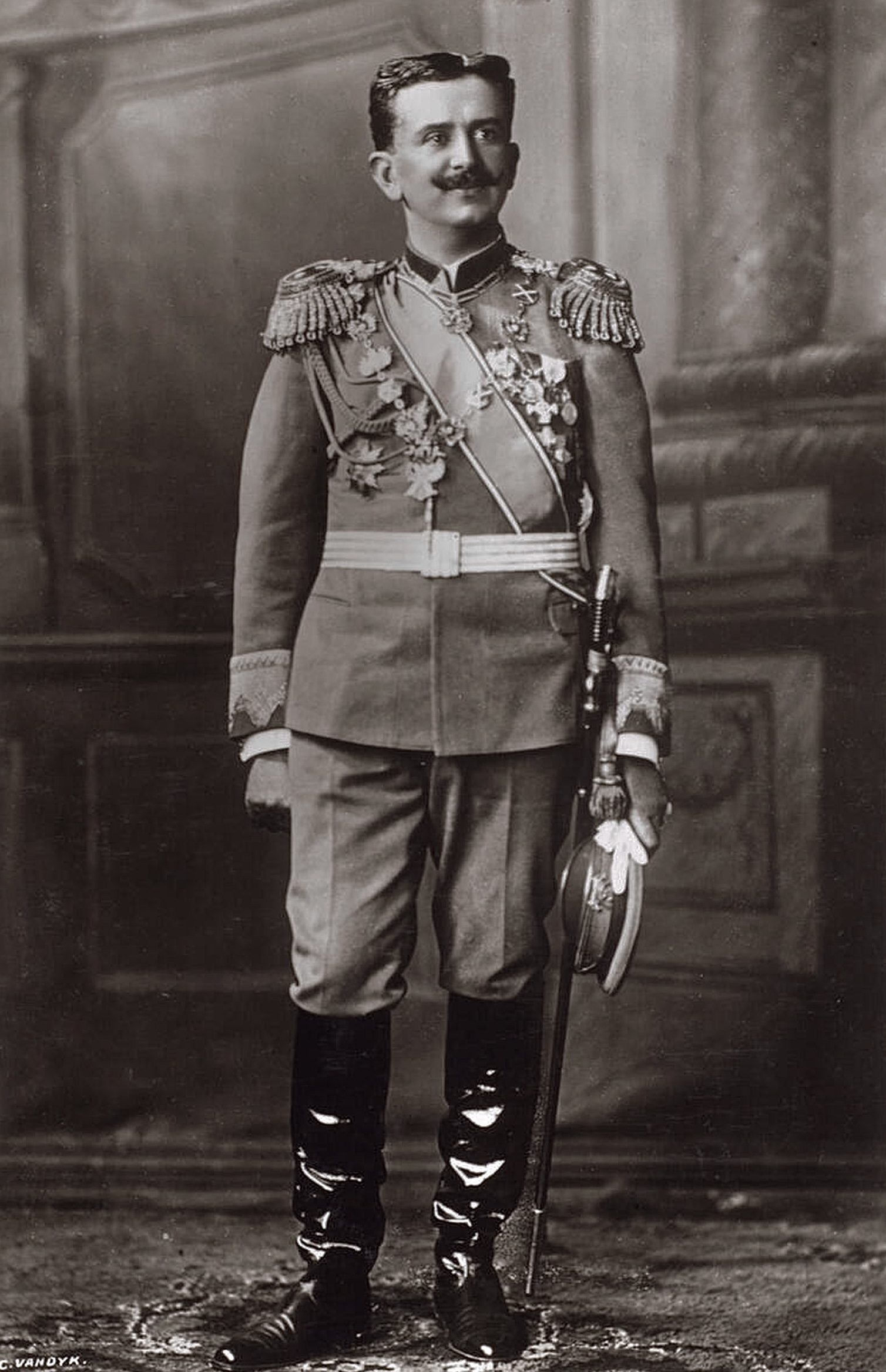
- Portrait in London, at the Coronation of George V and Mary in Westminster Abbey (1911)
- Born: 29 June 1871; Cetinje, Principality of Montenegro
- Died: 24 September 1939 (aged 67); Vienna, Nazi Germany
- Burial: Vienna Central Cemetery
- Spouse: Jutta of Mecklenburg-Strelitz (m. 1899)
- House: Petrović-Njegoš
- Father: Nicholas I of Montenegro
- Mother: Milena of Montenegro

Danilo Aleksandar Petrović-Njegoš (Serbian Cyrillic: Данило Александар Петровић-Његош; 29 June 1871– 24 September 1939) was the Crown Prince of Montenegro. He was the eldest son of King Nicholas I of Montenegro and his wife, Queen Milena.

== Life ==
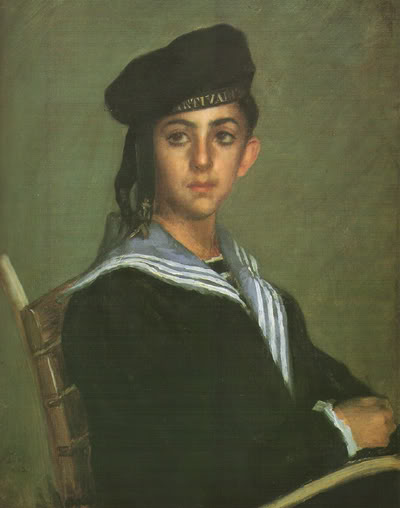
Portrait of Danilo, by Vlaho Bukovac, 1888

During the Balkan Wars and World War I, he led the Royal Montenegrin Army with his father (the King), Janko Vukotić, and Mitar Martinović. On 1 March 1921, Danilo was proclaimed the rightful King of Montenegro (upon the death of his father) and became head of the government-in-exile until 7 March 1921 when, for reasons that are still unclear, Danilo renounced his royal claims and headship of the royal house in favour of his nephew, Prince Michael of Montenegro. His reputation was undermined by announcing his renunciation on 5 March only to publicly retract this the following day, before re-affirming it the day after that. His decision was met with much dismay amongst the Montenegrin expatriate community.

After his renunciation in 1921, Prince Danilo resurfaced in 1927 when he sued Metro-Goldwyn-Mayer for libel and collected $4,000 in a Paris court for the false depiction of him in the first Hollywood version of the film The Merry Widow. In the film, "Prince Danilo of Montenegro" seduces a commoner and then rejects her because it could impoverish the royal treasury. He then regrets his actions and tries to win her back, but fails to convince her of his true love. The film bears no relation to reality.

The film was remade after the lawsuit. In addition to demoting the prince to a captain, the date of the action was changed from 1905 to 1885, when the real prince was a young boy. Captain Danilo is sent by the King of an unnamed Balkan country to romance that country’s richest widow. She is in Paris, and the Captain’s mission is to make sure she (and her wealth) do not get snapped up by some foreigner. He finds the trip, and work, congenial, and has a generally pleasant outlook on life. This version brought no lawsuit.

== Personal life ==
Prince Danilo was married to Duchess Augusta Charlotte Jutta of Mecklenburg-Strelitz, Duchess of Mecklenburg-Strelitz, by birth member of an ancient House of Mecklenburg. She was the eldest daughter of Adolf Friedrich V, Grand Duke of Mecklenburg-Strelitz and his wife, Princess Elisabeth of Anhalt, granddaughter of British Princess Augusta of Cambridge. The pair met in Russia, where Danilo was visiting his sisters Milica and Anastasia, while Jutta was staying with her cousin, Duchess Helene of Mecklenburg-Strelitz. The marriage was childless. After his renunciation in 1921, Danilo spent most of his life living in Nice.

He died in Vienna (which had recently been annexed by Nazi Germany) in 1939 without children.

Danilo is famous as a one-time composer, composing the music for the Serb patriotic song of his father King Nikola Onamo, 'namo!, which he published in Prague.

== Gallery ==
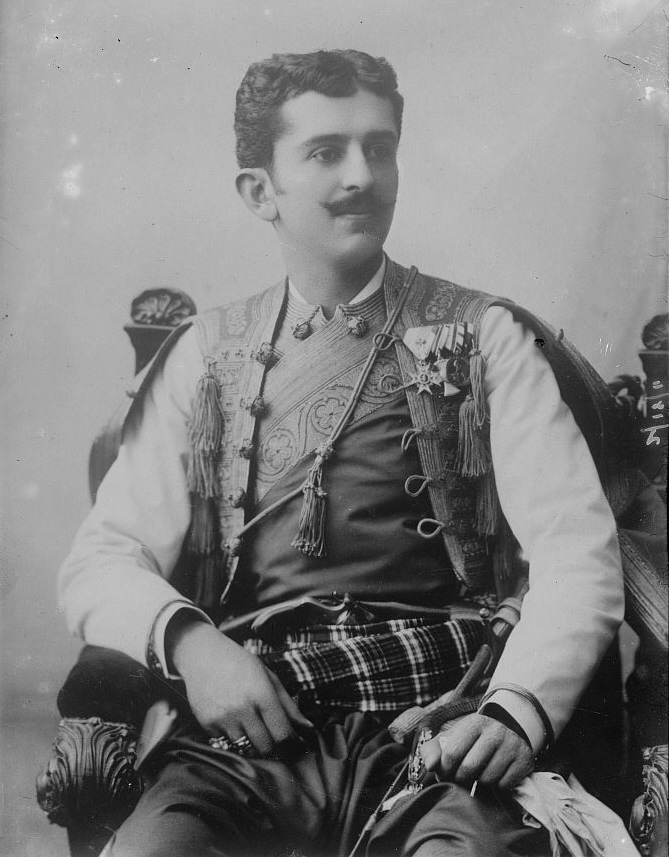
Portrait of young Crown Prince Danilo

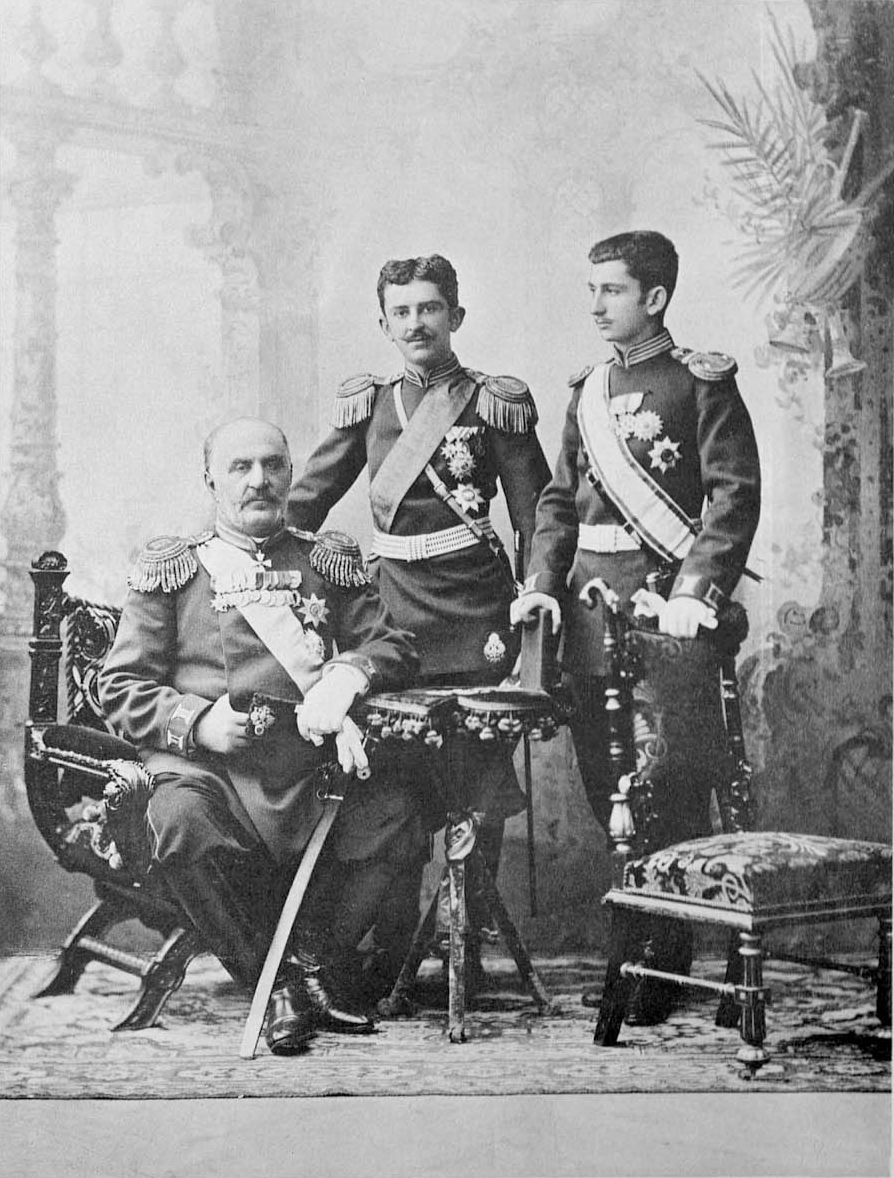
Prince Danilo in 1896, with his father Nicholas and brother Mirko

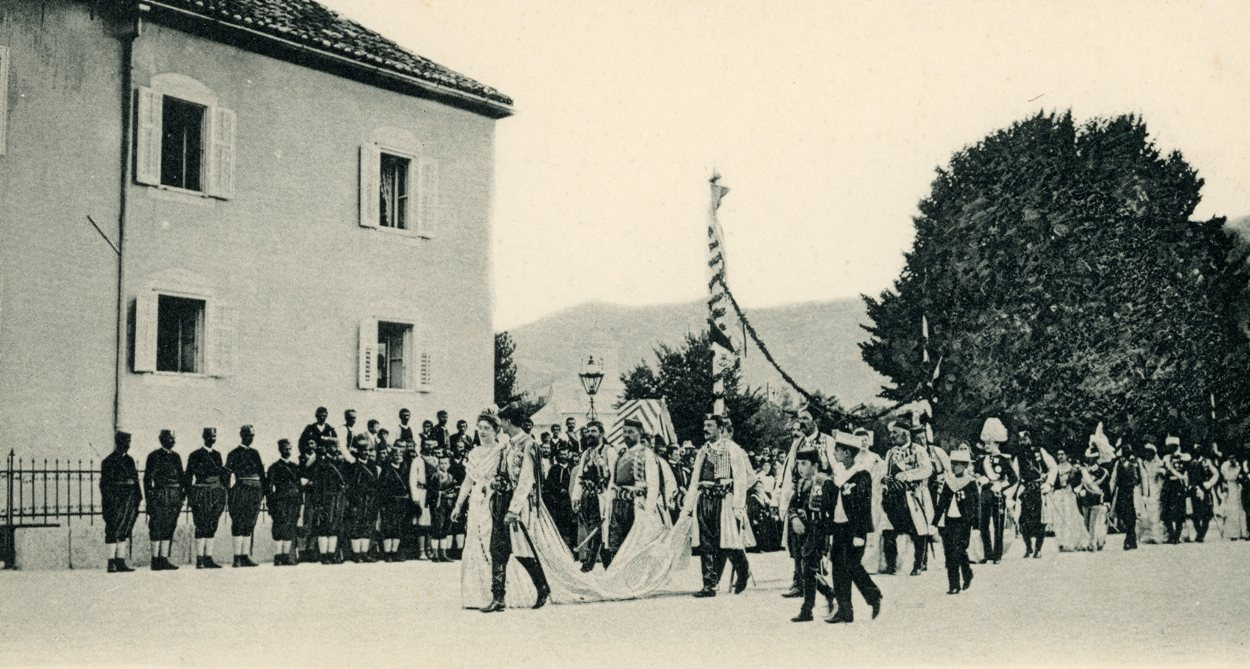
Danilo and Duchess Jutta leading their wedding procession in Cetinje, 1899

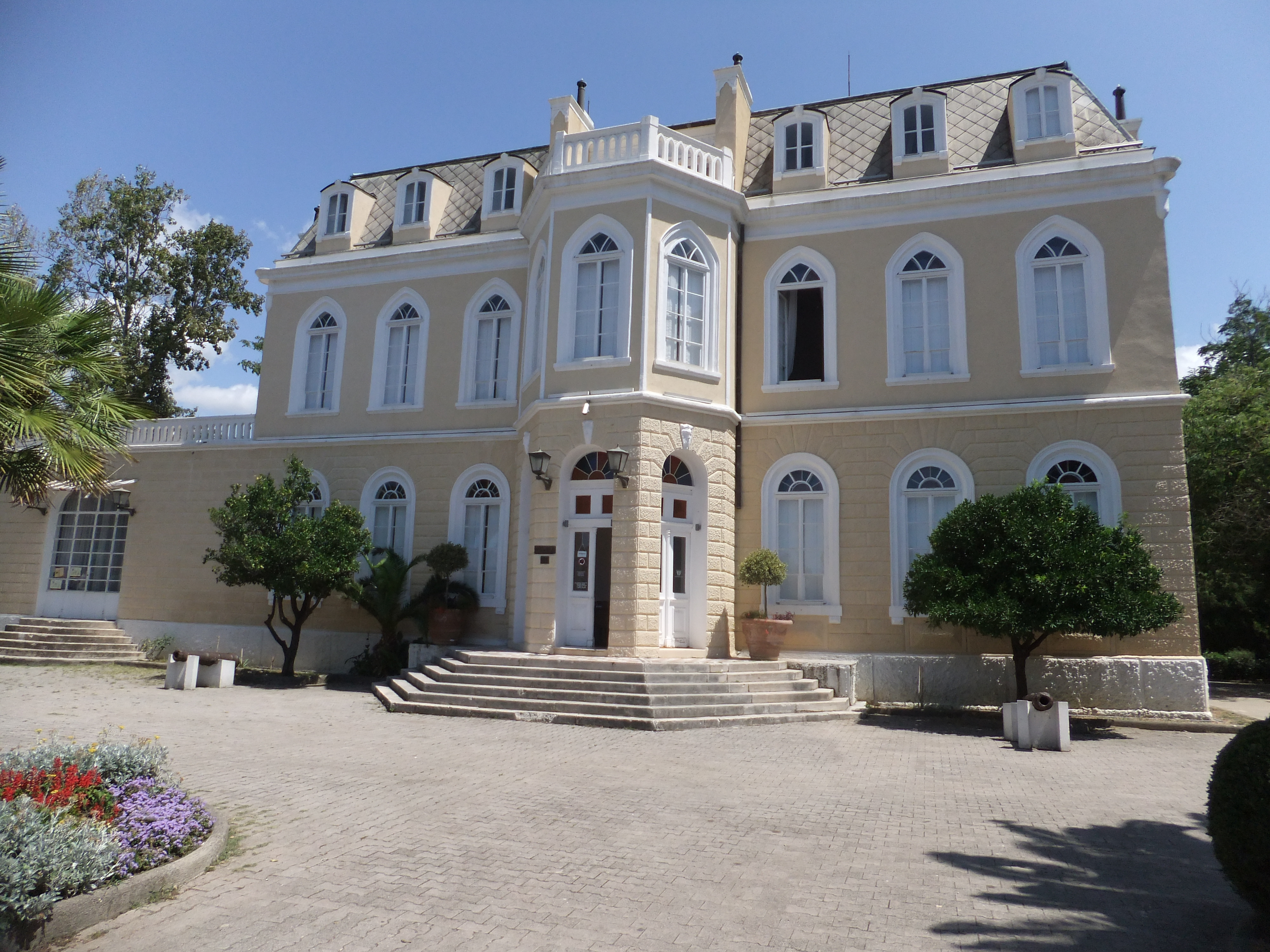
Bar Royal Palace, which Danilo used as summer residence

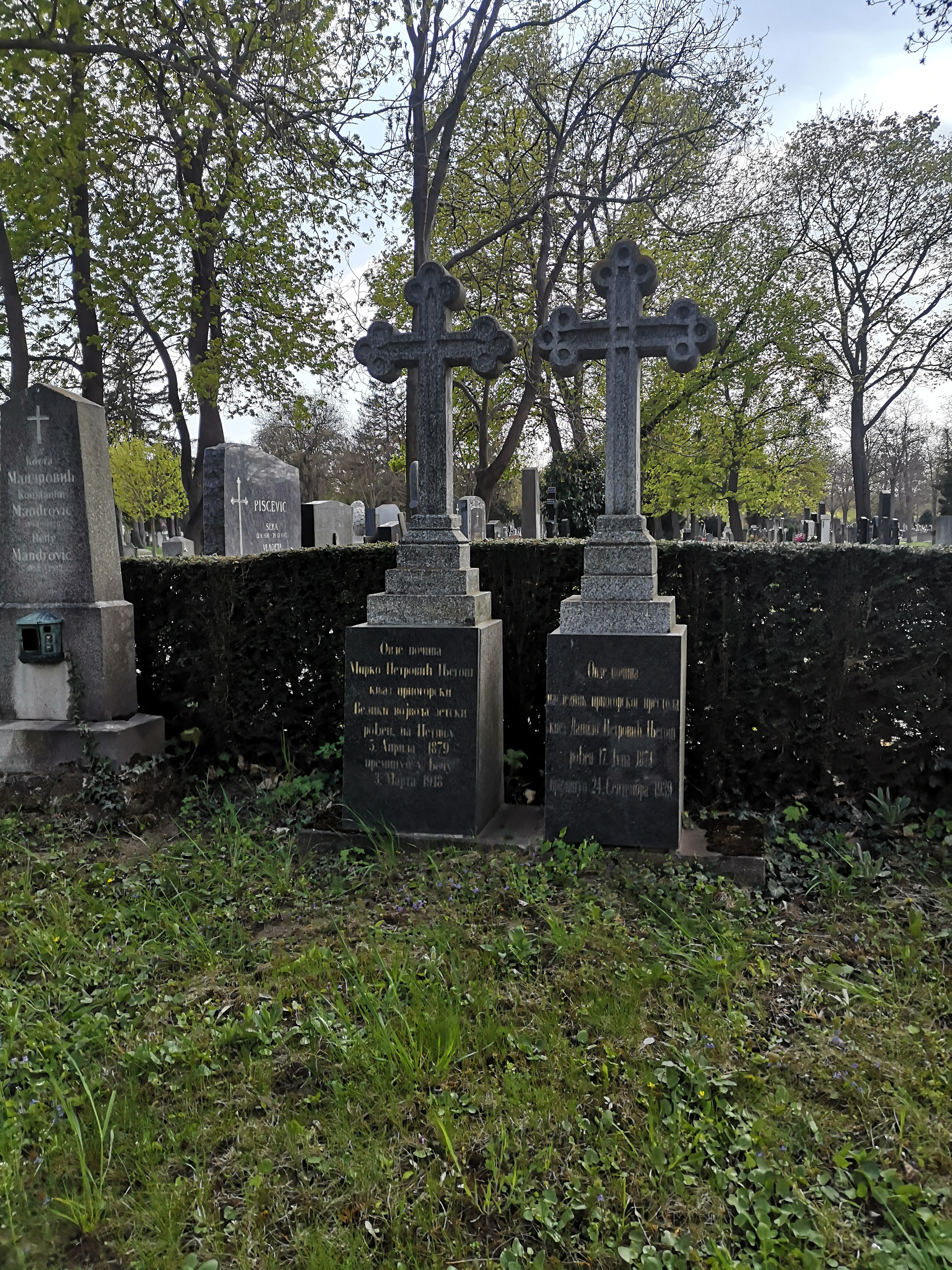
Prince Danilo's grave at the Vienna Central Cemetery

Danilo, Crown Prince of Montenegro House of Petrović-Njegoš Born: 29 June 1871 Died: 24 September 1939
Titles in pretence
Preceded by King Nikola I	— TITULAR — King of Montenegro; 1–7 March 1921; Reason for succession failure: Montenegro declared union with Serbia in 1918	Succeeded by Prince Mihail
