= Sardar =

Persian title of nobility

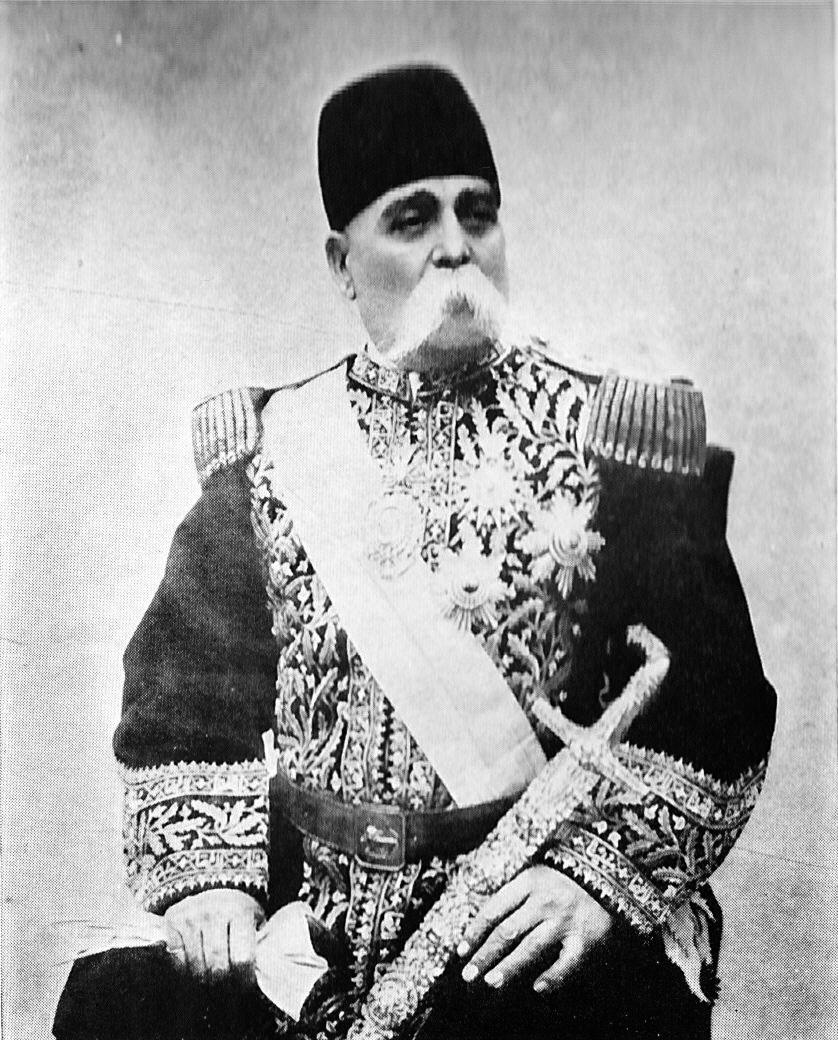
Sardar-I-Azam, Prince Abdol Majid Mirza of Qajar Persia c. 1920s.

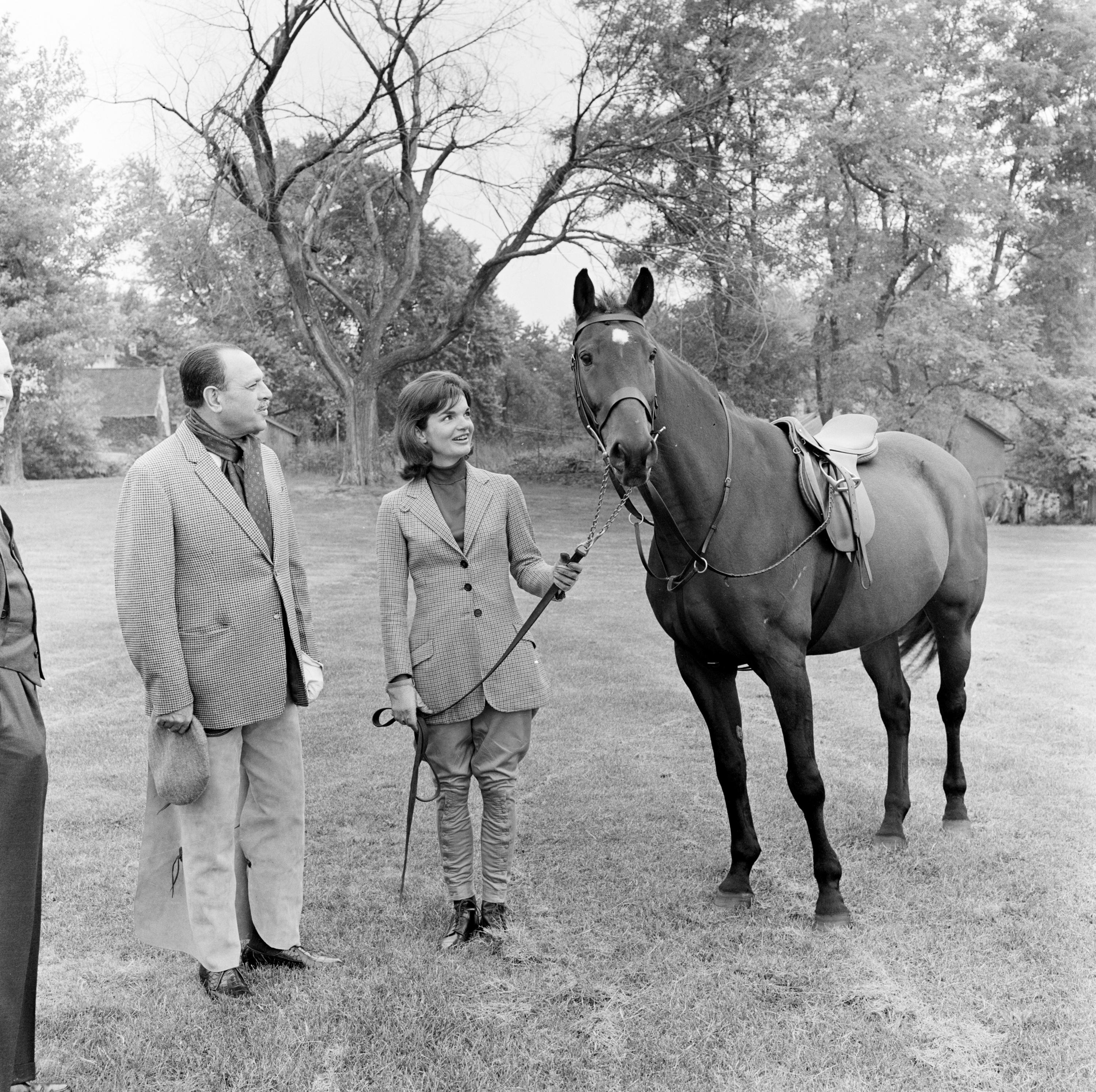
Pakistani President Ayub Khan and First Lady Jacqueline Kennedy with the prized gelding "Sardar".

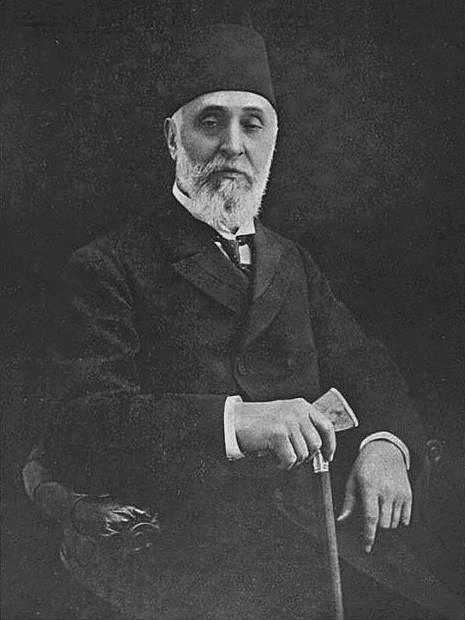
Grand Vizier Ahmet Tevfik Pasha, the last Ottoman Serdar-ı Azam.

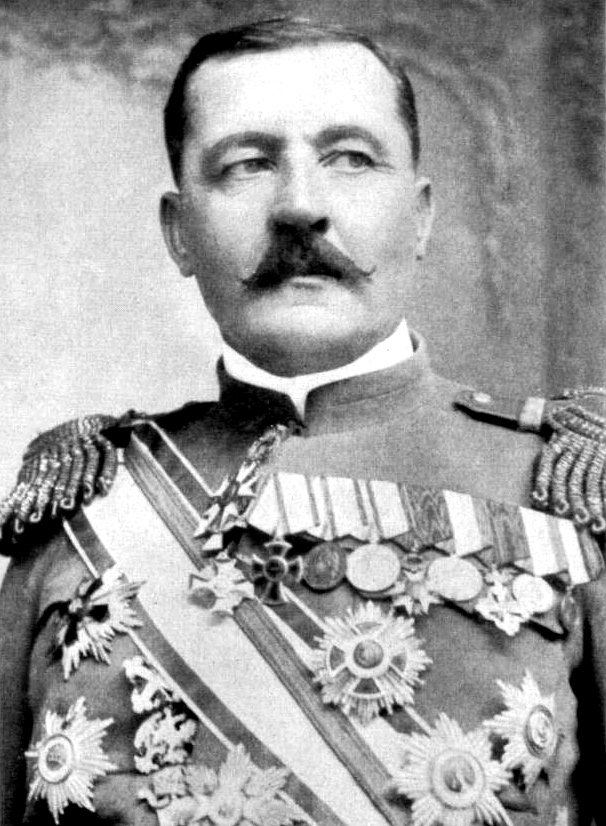
Serdar Janko Vukotić of the Principality and Kingdom of Montenegro.

Sardar (Persian: سردار, romanized: Sardâr, pronounced [sæɹˈdɒːɹ]; lit. 'commander, chief, leader') is a title of royalty and nobility that was originally used to denote Muslim princes, noblemen, kings, and other aristocrats. It has also been used to denote a Muslim chief of a tribe. It is used as a Persian synonym of the title Sheikh of Arabic origin.

The term and its cognates originate from Persian sardār (سردار) and have been historically used across Persia (Iran), the Ottoman Empire and Turkey (as "Serdar"), Afghanistan (as "Sardar" for a member of the royal Mohammadzai clan in meaning of noblemen), Pakistan (for tribal chiefs), Mesopotamia (now Iraq), Syria, Central Asia (in Tajikistan and Uzbekistan as "Sardor"), the Caucasus, the Balkans, and Egypt (as "Sirdar").

== Examples of regional use ==
- In Pakistan, the title Sardar marks the chief of a tribe in the tribal dominated country.
- In the Royal Afghan Kingdom, the original Nishan-i-Sardari (Order of the Leader), founded by King Amanullah in 1923, was bestowed for exceptional service to the Crown by the Afghan monarch. Recipients enjoyed the titles of Sardar-i-Ala or Sardar-i-Ali before their names and also received grants of land. The original Order was disbanded in 1929, and was later revived by King Muhammad Zahir Shah.
- In Ottoman Turkey, Serdar was a rank in Bosnia Eyalet with Herzegovina Eyalet, later Bosnia Vilayet, encompassing entire Bosnia and Herzegovina, and parts of Montenegro and Serbia, as well as in other parts Ottoman Montenegro, Serbia, and other lands. Serdar was also used in the Principality of Montenegro and the Principality of Serbia as an honorary "title" below that of Vojvoda. For example, Janko Vukotić who was a military leader and former prime minister of Montenegro with title of Serdar. However, these were not noble titles as there was no nobility in Serbia and Montenegro and no hereditary titles apart from those borne by members of the reigning families of both countries.
- In Persia, Sardar-i-Bozorg was the title of both Hossein Khan Sardar and his brother Hasan Khan Qajar. Both were uncles of Agha Khan Qajar, the King-Emperor of Persia and the Commander-in-chief under Emperor Fat′h-Ali Shah Qajar in the Russo-Persian Wars of 1804 and 1826.
- In Bengal, the Sardars of Bengal are hereditary village chiefs. Under the Nawabs of Dhaka, a Sardari system was introduced in the old city as well.
- In Punjab, tribal chiefs, military commanders, and noble personalities with wealth and influence were referred to as Sardars. The title is commonly used by both Muslims and Sikhs

== Aristocrats ==
- In the Hazara Division of Pakistan, the word Sardar is used by the Karlal tribe, traditionally, to stress their upper-caste status.
- In the districts of Poonch and Sudhanoti, Kashmir, Sardar is used by the hybrid Sudhan tribe and Douli tribe. Also, other tribal families in Poonch use Sardar at the beginning of their names.
- Similarly Sardar is used by Khattar tribe noble men, native to the districts of Attock and adjacent areas of Rawalpindi.

== Head of state ==
- In Persian, Sardar i-Azam was occasionally used as an alternative title for the Shahanshah's Head of government, normally styled Vazir i-Azam, notably in 1904-06 for a Qajar prince, Prince Abdol Majid Mirza.
- Mohammad Daoud Khan of Afghanistan had the title of Sardar as president.
- Saparmurat Niyazov, the authoritarian leader of Turkmenistan in 1990–2006, carried a few glorifying titles, one of which was Serdar (“Leader”).

== Military title ==
- The title Serdar is also common amongst Ottomans in referring to a Commander-in-Chief. The Serbs adopted this usage from the Ottomans (e.g. Serdar Janko Vukotić).
- In Turkish, Serdar or Serdar-i-Ekrem was the title of the Commander-in-Chief in several military operations throughout the Ottoman Empire history.
- In Afghanistan, Sardar-i-Salar meant Field Marshal or General of the Army.
- Sirdar was the official title of the British Commander-in-Chief of the Anglo-Egyptian army.
- In Iran, Sardar is used to address Islamic Revolutionary Guard Corps high-ranking officers. (see List of senior officers of the Islamic Revolutionary Guards)

== In non Islamic uses ==
- In the Maratha Empire, the more administrative role of Sirdar-Bahadur denoted a Governor General or Chief Minister of a remote province; this best equates to a Mughal Subahdar or British Viceroy in function and rank.
- Sardar was used for important political, tribal, military and religious officers rankings by the Sikh Empire.
- In the Kingdom of Nepal and Gorkha Kingdom, Sardars were chief of administration and military in the provinces.
- The Kapurthala State, have been ruled by kings of state styled Sardar. For example, the king of Kapurthala used the title of Sardar.

== See also ==
- List of Ottoman grand viziers
- Mankari
- Zamindar
- Jagirdar
- Feudalism in Pakistan
- Balochistan
- Baloch tribes
- Mazhabi Sikh
- Sardar (Sherpa)
