= Jahurul Haque Sardar =

Bangladeshi politician

Member of Parliament from Khulna-6
- In office 1988–1990
- Preceded by: Momen Uddin Ahmed
- Succeeded by: Shah Md. Ruhul Quddus

Jahurul Haque Sardar is a politician from the Khulna District of Bangladesh and an elected member of parliament from Khulna-6.

== Career ==
Sardar was elected to parliament from Khulna-6 as an independent candidate in 1988 Bangladeshi general election.
