= Syed Ali Ahmed =

British Indian footballer

Personal information
- Full name: Syed Ali Ahmed
- Date of birth: 1887
- Place of birth: Calcutta, British India
- Date of death: 1965 (aged 77–78)
- Place of death: Dacca, East Pakistan
- Position: Centre-forward

Youth career
- 1907: Dacca College

Senior career*
| Years | Team | Apps | (Gls) |
| 19??–1910 | Mohammedan Sporting | | |
| 1928–1929 | Khulna Mohammedan Sporting | | |
- * Club domestic league appearances and goals

Syed Ali Ahmed, was a former association footballer, who played for the Mohammedan Sporting football club in the 1900s. Known for his abilities as a Forward and his leadership.

== Early life ==
Born in 1887, Ahmed studied at Calcutta Madrasa and Dacca College. At Dacca College, he was an exceptional player for the football team along with the cricket team.

== Playing career ==
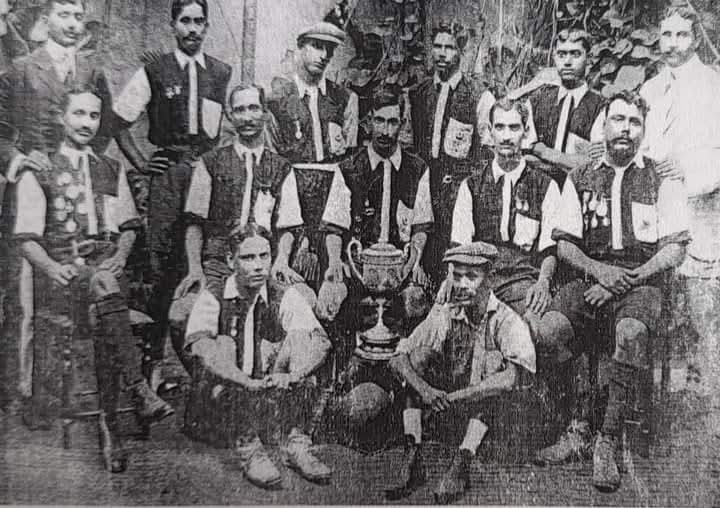
Syed Ali Ahmed (middle) with Mohammedan Sporting in 1909.

After completing his education, Ahmed would join Mohammedan Sporting. Ahmed, known for his renowned performances as a forward, guided his team to several trophies, notably, the 1909 Cooch Behar Cup. Where he served as captain, the team defeated Mohun Bagan. The following year, Ahmed was selected for the position of Deputy Superintendent in the Eastern Bengal and Assam Police. Due to his participation in this field, Ahmed's first division football career, would come to an end, as he was already suffering from a knee injury. Regardless, Ahmed would still continue to feature in several district, regional, tournaments across the country.

After Independence, he would return to participating in local tournaments due to the recovery of his knee injury. In the 1920s, Ahmed also played for Khulna Mohammedan Sporting in the years of 1928 and 1929.

== Personal life ==
Ahmed's father, Nawab Syed Muhammad Bahadur was a famous scholar and writer. His elder brother, Syed Hossein, became a famous figure later on in his life. His elder sister married to A. K. Fazlul Huq.

Ahmed passed away in 1965 at Dacca, East Pakistan.

== Honours ==
- Cooch Behar Cup:
  - Winners (1): 1909
