= Bar Royal Palace =

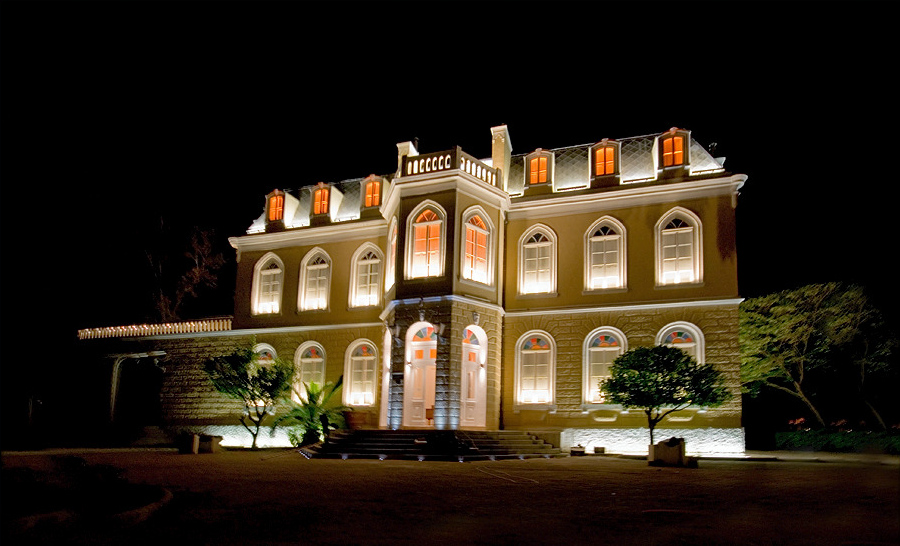
Bar Royal Palace

Bar Royal Palace or Villa Topolica is a former royal summer residence in Bar, Montenegro, owned by the Petrović-Njegoš dynasty.

== History ==
The palace was constructed by king Nikola I Petrović-Njegoš in 1885, and was a gift to his daughter Princess Zorka and his son-in-law, Prince Petar Karađorđević. The complex includes the large and the small palace, a chapel, houses for the guards and a winter garden. A spacious ballroom was added in 1910.

At the front of the palace, there was a wooden pier. Between 1866 and 1916, King Nikola owned ten yachts. One of them, Sibil, was bought from Jules Verne, the novelist. The last yacht bought was the Rumija. In 1915, it was sunk in the Bar harbour by the Austro-Hungarian navy. The palace was used as summer residence of Danilo, Crown Prince of Montenegro and his wife, Duchess Jutta of Mecklenburg-Strelitz.

Currently, the palace houses the city museum of Bar. Also, it is used as a venue for festivals, concerts, exhibitions and literary events.
