= Hasan Rıza Pasha =

Ottoman military commander

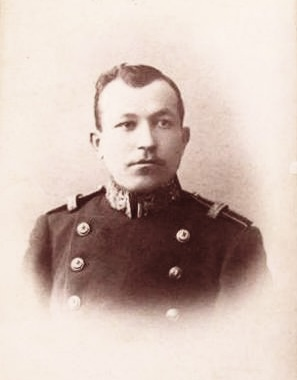
- Born: 1871; Tosya, Kastamonu Vilayet, Ottoman Empire (modern Turkey)
- Died: 30 January 1913 (aged 41–42); Shkodër, Scutari Vilayet, Ottoman Empire (modern Albania)
- Burial place: Parrucë Mosque, Shkodër
- Relatives: Mehmed Namık Pasha (father)
- Military career
- Allegiance: Ottoman Empire
- Branch: Ottoman Army
- Rank: General
- Conflicts: Siege of Shkodër X

Hasan Rıza Pasha (1871 – 30 January 1913) was a Turkish general in the Ottoman Army. He is known as a hero in the Republic of Albania.

== Life ==
He was the son of the distinguished Ottoman statesman Mehmed Namık Pasha, who was the Governor of Baghdad, where Hasan Riza was born. He was of Turkish origin, as Mehmed Namık's grandfather migrated from Konya to Constantinople. He entered the Ottoman Military Academy in 1892 and graduated on March 13, 1895. He continued his studies in Germany (1899–1900). After serving in Iraq (1901–-1911) he was promoted to the rank of General and assigned as wali of Shkodër.

He was the main commander during the Siege of Shkodër and became the symbol of resistance against the Serbian and Montenegrin invasion. He did his utmost to defend the town, stating "Shkodra is our fate or our grave, but not our shame". He was assassinated by Osman Bali and Mehmed Kavaja, both servants of Essad Pasha.

== Legacy ==
Gjergj Fishta delivered the principal commemorative speech in 1936 when Hasan Riza Pasha's remains were ceremonially reburied in Shkodër stating: "Hasan Riza Pasha will be remembered as the greatest patriot for saving us from the claws of the Montenegrins... therefore Hasan Riza Pasha deserves to be remembered alongside the heroes of the Albanian nation"

A Turkish-Albanian college in Shkodër bears his name. He was decorated for "First Class Bravery" (Albanian: "Trimëri e Klasit të Parë) in August 1996, by Albanian President Sali Berisha. and a monument was erected in his honor in 2007.

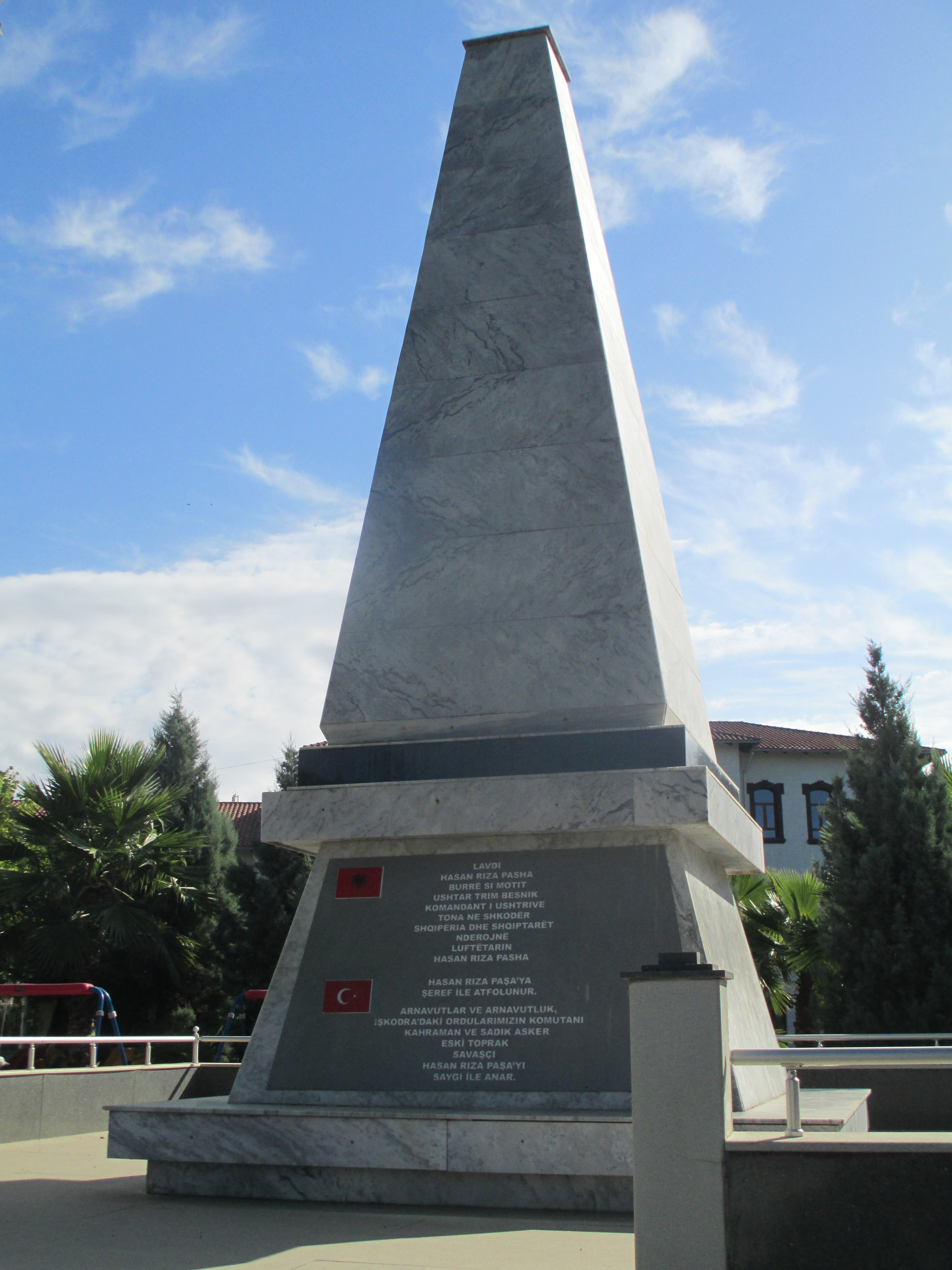
A Monument dedicated to Hasan Riza Pasha in Shkodër
