= 1914–1918 Online =

Online encyclopedia of World War I

1914–1918 Online: International Encyclopedia of the First World War is an international, English-language online encyclopedia of the First World War. Deemed the largest research network of its kind, it officially went online on 8 October 2014. The editorial office is staffed by historians and uses Semantic MediaWiki.

The Freie Universität Berlin (FU Berlin) and the Bayerische Staatsbibliothek (Bavarian State Library) in Munich initiated the online academic reference work in the run-up to the centenary commemorations of the Great War. The project has since gained the support of several international partners, including the German Historical Institutes in London, Moscow, Paris, Rome, Warsaw as well as the Orient-Institut Istanbul (Oriental Institute in Istanbul). It has furthermore acquired eight-figure funds from the Deutsche Forschungsgemeinschaft (German Research Foundation), funding which was extended in 2016 by an "Open Encyclopedia System" follow-up grant.

The project leaders are Oliver Janz, professor of modern history at the Friedrich-Meinecke-Institut (FMI), Nicolas Apostolopoulos, director of the Center for Digital Systems (CeDiS), both at the Freie Universität Berlin, and Gregor Horstkemper from the Zentrum für Elektronisches Publizieren - ZEP (Center for Electronic Publication) at the Bavarian State Library.

1914-1918-Online intends to provide the most recent global research on the First World War to the academic community and the public through a multi-perspective, open-access approach. Up to 1,000 experts from over fifty countries will be working on or have worked on this ongoing project. With a goal of approximately 1,500 entries, all content is published using the Creative Commons license CC BY-NC-ND 3.0. The fully citable, Digital Object Identifier (DOI) equipped texts have been peer-reviewed (double blind) and enriched with images, maps and other related content. The encyclopedia is divided thematically and regionally, and all sections are easily accessible via search and navigation options (filter, register, timeline). Links and interfaces connect 1914-1918-online to other databases as well as information systems such as Europeana 1914-1918, CENDARI, WorldCat and Zotero.

The editorial board is composed of seven General Editors (Ute Daniel, Peter Gatrell, Oliver Janz, Heather Jones, Jennifer Keene, Alan Kramer and Bill Nasson), several Section Editors, and numerous external reviewers, a total of roughly 100 persons. The Editorial Advisory Board includes Annette Becker, Jürgen Danyel, Josef Ehmer, Gudrun Gersmann, Antonio Gibelli, Gerhard Hirschfeld, John Horne, Jürgen Kocka, Gerd Krumeich, Jürgen Osterhammel, Hew Strachan, Jay Winter and Erik-Jan Zürcher.

The project made the American Library Association's 2015 "Annual List of Best Historical Materials" and received the second prize at the 2015 Berlin Digital Humanities Awards.
