= Khulna-6 =

Constituency of Bangladesh's Jatiya Sangsad

Coordinates: 22.59°N 89.32°E

- Constituency for the Jatiya Sangsad
- District: Khulna District
- Division: Khulna Division
- Electorate: 423,331 (2026)

Current constituency
- Created: 1973
- Party: Bangladesh Jamaat-e-Islami
- Member: Md. Abul Kalam Azad
- ← 103 Khulna-5 105 Satkhira-1 →

Khulna-6 is a constituency represented in the Jatiya Sangsad (National Parliament) of Bangladesh since 2026 by Md. Abul Kalam Azad of the Bangladesh Jamaat-e-Islami.

== Boundaries ==
The constituency encompasses Koyra and Paikgachha upazilas.

== History ==
The constituency was created for the first general elections in newly independent Bangladesh, held in 1973.

Ahead of the 2008 general election, the Election Commission redrew constituency boundaries to reflect population changes revealed by the 2001 Bangladesh census. The 2008 redistricting altered the boundaries of the constituency.

Ahead of the 2014 general election, the Election Commission expanded the boundaries of the constituency. Previously it had excluded one union parishad of Paikgachha Upazila: Deluti.

== Members of Parliament ==
| Election | Member | Party |
|---|---|---|
| 1973 | M. A. Bari | Awami League |
| 1979 | Khan A. Sabur | Bangladesh Muslim League |
Major Boundary Changes
| 1986 | Momen Uddin Ahmed | Jatiya Party (Ershad) |
| 1988 | Jahurul Haque Sardar | Jatiya Party (Ershad) |
| 1991 | Shah Md. Ruhul Quddus | Bangladesh Jamaat-e-Islami |
| 1996 | Sheikh Md. Nurul Haque | Awami League |
| 2001 | Shah Md. Ruhul Quddus | Bangladesh Jamaat-e-Islami |
| 2008 | Sohorab Ali Sana | Awami League |
| 2014 | Sheikh Md. Nurul Haque | Awami League |
| 2018 | Akhteruzzaman Babu | Awami League |
| 2024 | Md. Rashiduzzaman | Awami League |
| 2026 | Md. Abul Kalam Azad (Khulna politician) | Bangladesh Jamaat-e-Islami |

== Elections ==
=== Elections in the 2020s ===
General election 2026: Khulna-6
| Party | Candidate | Votes | % | ±% |
|---|---|---|---|---|
| Jamaat | Md. Abul Kalam Azad | 150,724 | 52.90 | +6.6 |
| BNP | S M Monirul Hasan | 124,710 | 43.77 | N/A |
| Majority | | 26,014 | 9.13 | +3.13 |
| Turnout | | 284,970 | 67.3 | −21.8 |
| Registered electors | | 423,331 | | |
| Jamaat gain from AL | | | | |

=== Elections in the 2010s ===
Sheikh Md. Nurul Haque was elected unopposed in the 2014 general election after opposition parties withdrew their candidacies in a boycott of the election.

=== Elections in the 2000s ===
General Election 2008: Khulna-6
| Party | Candidate | Votes | % | ±% |
|---|---|---|---|---|
| AL | Sohorab Ali Sana | 131,121 | 52.3 | +12.6 |
| Jamaat | Shah Md. Ruhul Quddus | 116,161 | 46.3 | −10.6 |
| IAB | AKM Rezaul Karim | 3,195 | 1.3 | N/A |
| BDB | Nepal Krishna Das | 357 | 0.1 | N/A |
| Majority | | 14,960 | 6.0 | −11.2 |
| Turnout | | 250,834 | 89.1 | +1.1 |
| AL gain from Jamaat | | | | |

General Election 2001: Khulna-6
| Party | Candidate | Votes | % | ±% |
|---|---|---|---|---|
| Jamaat | Shah Md. Ruhul Quddus | 127,874 | 56.9 | +28.6 |
| AL | Sheikh Md. Nurul Haque | 89,312 | 39.7 | +1.6 |
| Jatiya Party (M) | Md. Azizur Rahman Khan | 5,170 | 2.3 | N/A |
| IJOF | G. M. Abdul Hamid | 1,524 | 0.7 | N/A |
| CPB | Sheikh Abdul Hannan | 906 | 0.4 | −1.2 |
| Majority | | 38,562 | 17.2 | +7.4 |
| Turnout | | 224,786 | 88.0 | +5.1 |
| Jamaat gain from AL | | | | |

=== Elections in the 1990s ===
General Election June 1996: Khulna-6
| Party | Candidate | Votes | % | ±% |
|---|---|---|---|---|
| AL | Sheikh Md. Nurul Haque | 66,033 | 38.1 | −1.9 |
| Jamaat | Shah Md. Ruhul Kuddus | 49,023 | 28.3 | −12.2 |
| JP(E) | SM Babar Ali | 38,467 | 22.2 | +8.4 |
| BNP | G. A. Sabur | 16,835 | 9.7 | +5.1 |
| CPB | Md. Abdur Rashiduzzaman Moril | 2,743 | 1.6 | N/A |
| Zaker Party | Md. Abdus Sattar Mollah | 238 | 0.1 | −0.1 |
| Majority | | 17,010 | 9.8 | +9.3 |
| Turnout | | 173,339 | 82.9 | +14.6 |
| AL gain from Jamaat | | | | |

General Election 1991: Khulna-6
| Party | Candidate | Votes | % | ±% |
|---|---|---|---|---|
| Jamaat | Shah Md. Ruhul Quddus | 58,369 | 40.5 | |
| AL | Sheikh Md. Nurul Haque | 57,669 | 40.0 | |
| JP(E) | Kisumatul Kagaji | 19,856 | 13.8 | |
| BNP | Moin Uddin Sarkar | 6,602 | 4.6 | |
| Independent | Md. M. Akbar Hossain Gazi | 1,063 | 0.7 | |
| Zaker Party | M. A. Sattar | 268 | 0.2 | |
| Bangladesh Samajtantrik Dal (Khalekuzzaman) | Bilob Kanti Mondol | 257 | 0.2 | |
| Majority | | 700 | 0.5 | |
| Turnout | | 144,084 | 68.3 | |
| Jamaat gain from | | | | |
