= Radomir Vešović =

Montenegrin and Yugoslav military officer and politician

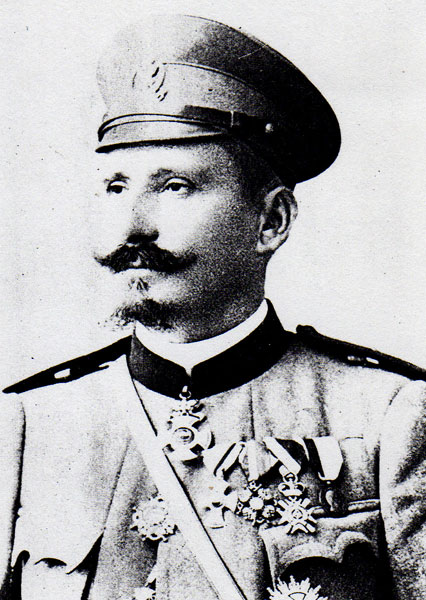

9th Minister of War of Kingdom of Montenegro
- In office 2 January – 15 January 1916
- Monarch: Nicholas I
- Prime Minister: Lazar Mijušković
- Preceded by: Mašan Božović
- Succeeded by: Himself (as Minister of War of Kingdom of Montenegro in-Exile)

1st Minister of War of Kingdom of Montenegro in-Exile
- In office 15 January – 12 May 1916
- Monarch: Nicholas I
- Prime Minister: Lazar Mijušković
- Preceded by: Himself (as Minister of War of Kingdom of Montenegro)
- Succeeded by: Milo Matanović

Governor of Metohija
- In office 1913–1915

Commander of Old Serbia Detachment
- In office 28 August 1910 – 20 January 1916 Serving with Luka Gojnić, Mitar Martinović and Janko Vukotić
- Commander-in-chief: Nicholas I
- Ministers of War: Mitar Martinović; Ivo Đurović; Marko Đukanović; Janko Vukotić; Mitar Martinović; Janko Vukotić; Risto Popović; Mašan Božović; Himself

Personal details
- Born: 6 April 1871 Lopate, Lijeva Rijeka, Principality of Montenegro
- Died: 27 September 1938 (aged 67) Slavonski Šamac, Sava Banovina, Kingdom of Yugoslavia
- Awards: Golden Obilić Medal

Military service
- Allegiance: Montenegro
- Rank: 1910 - Brigadier; 1 November 1912 - General
- Commands: (1911 — 1912) commander of the Vasojević brigade; (1912) commander of the group of Montenegrin brigades that captured Metohija from the Ottomans; (1912—1913) commander of the Old-Serbian Detachment; (end of 1913) governor of Metohija; (1915—1916) War Minister of the Kingdom of Montenegro; (1919—?) General of Division in III Army of Kingdom of SHS
- Battles/wars: First Balkan War; Battle for Plav and Gusinje; Battle for Peja and Deçan; Battle for Gjakova; Siege of Scutari; First World War; Capture of Scutari

Radomir Vešović (Serbian Cyrillic: Радомир Вешовић; 6 April 1871 – 27 September 1938) was a Montenegrin and Yugoslav military officer and politician. Vešović was born in village of Lopate in Montenegrin county of Lijeva Rijeka, in a family whose male members were traditionally military officers. He completed military education in Italy in 1890 as the first member of Vasojevići tribe who received formal military education. In 1911 he was appointed as commander of Vasojević brigade, with rank of brigadier.

At the beginning of the First Balkan War he was commander of the group of Montenegrin brigades that captured Plav, Gusinje, Deçan and Gjakova from the Ottomans, which brought him the rank of General. He continued his war engagement by participating in the Montenegrin siege of Scutari where he was wounded twice. He showed an exceptional courage which earned him a golden Obilić Medal.

At the end of 1913 Vešović was appointed as the governor of Metohija (the supreme commander of the military and civil administration of Đakovica Divisional Area) where he became also known as the firm hand. In 1913 he was promoted to a commander of the Old-Serbian Detachment until he became the Montenegrin War minister in period 1913–1915.

After the beginning of the First World War and against the order of Montenegrin King Nikola, Vešović captured Scutari on 27 June 1915, despite opposition of Entante and behind the back of Serbian supreme command. During the Austro-Hungarian occupation of Montenegro, Vešović was the main organizer of the planned general uprising against the occupying forces planned for Vidovdan 1916 or for Saint Peter's feast day. The plans were discovered and occupation government sent patrol to arrest Vešović. Vešović escaped after killing one Austro-Hungarian officer and joined Chetnik guerrilla rebel forces in the region of Northern Montenegro and Metohija. He did not participate in their actions and in January 1918 surrendered after receiving guarantees that his life would be spared if he would participate in the Austro-Hungarian campaign to convince comitadji irregulars to stop their actions. Vešović accepted to do so and lost what remained of his prestige, before he was interned to Austria.

After the World War I and unification of Montenegro and Serbia, Vešović was one of four generals of former Montenegrin army who was accepted as general of new Army of Kingdom of Serbs, Croats and Slovenes, receiving the rank General of Division. Being strong supporter of the Montenegrin Petrović dynasty, he refused to pledge his loyalty to Karađorđević dynasty, which together with some speech he held in Andrijevica, resulted with his arrest in 1919 and trial in Zemun in 1921.

== Early life ==
Vešović was born in a family whose male members, including his father Luka, had traditionally been military officers. He completed primary school in Lijeva Rijeka and attended secondary school in Cetinje for five years. In 1887 he was selected to attend further military education in Italy which he completed with excellent success. Vešović was the first member of Vasojevići who completed formal military education of an officer in 1890.

== Early military career ==
In 1908 Vešović reported to his supreme command about great frustration of Albanian population because of the increase of taxes. In the same year Vešović was officially accused for undertaking actions toward Berane nahiyah which could provoke war with the Ottoman Empire. He was allegedly responsible for cutting the telegraph wires and distribution of hand grenades among population of Berane. The official investigation concluded that he was not guilty. According to some sources, the false accusations were result of the animosity between Vešović and voivode Lakić Vojvodić who competed with Vešović for prestige in Vasojevići. In 1910 he was awarded with the rank of brigadier. Since 1911, Vešović was a commander of the Vasojević brigade.

== First Balkan War ==
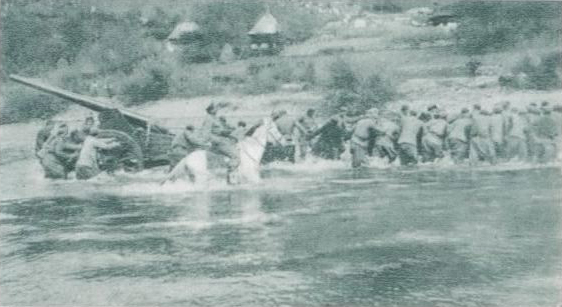
Together with Montenegrin artillery unit, Vešović crosses the river Lim riding a horse, October 1912

In October 1912, at the beginning of the First Balkan War he was commander of the group of Montenegrin brigades that captured Plav and Gusinje from the Ottomans. After the battle, which was among population of Trijebač interpreted as revenge for the Battle of Novšiće, Vešović captured Greben and Lipovica above Gusinje and created position to attack Ottoman flanks in Metohija.

Most of the garrison of Gjakova fled to Krasniqe. According to some sources, the army commanded by Vešović plundered population of Gjakova. On 24 October Vešović reported that he took half of his army and went to disarm Krasniqe tribe who began to organize together with retreating forces from Gjakova. Since he was unable to disarm Krasniqi tribesmen who lived in about 800 houses, each with at least two Mauser guns, he did not dare to proceed further with advance leaving such potential great threat behind his flanks.

On 1 November 1912 Vešović was promoted to rank of General. Vešović participated in Montenegrin siege of Scutari where he was wounded twice, showing an exceptional courage which earned him a golden Obilić Medal and nickname the knight of Brdanjolt (Serbian: витез од Брдањолта).

At the end of 1913 Vešović appointed as governor of Metohija (supreme commander of military and civil administration of Đakovica Divisional Area) known as firm hand. Since the Catholic schools in the newly captured territories were perceived as centres of Austro-Hungarian propaganda, Vešović closed them and ordered that all children are to attend public government schools.

Vešović was commander of the Old-Serbian Detachment until 1913 when he was appointed as Minister of War.

== During World War I ==
=== Capture of Scutari ===
Against the order of Montenegrin King Nikola, Vešović captured Scutari on 27 June 1915, despite opposition of Entante and behind the back of Serbian supreme command and even his own chief of General Staff, Božidar Janković.

According to some sources, Vešović unsuccessfully tried to retreat over Albania before the forces of Austria-Hungary occupied the whole Montenegro, staying with his staff in Vraka.

=== Plans for uprising ===
At the beginning of the occupation of Montenegro by Austria-Hungary in early 1916, Vešović was the main organizer of the planned general uprising against the occupying forces. According to reports of occupying sources, the uprising was planned for Vidovdan or for Saint Peter's feast day. According to Rakočević, Vešović's plans for uprising were based on hopes that Allies would soon advance from Thessaloniki, otherwise he would himself give up any plans for rebellion.

The plans were discovered and the main organizers, including Vešović, arrested. When the Austrian soldiers arrested Vešović and conducted him from his village of Bukova Poljana toward Kolašin, he seized the first opportunity to kill Austrian Lieutenant near Mateševo and escape into the woods together with his brothers Pavić and Novica. The occupying authorities undertook punitive and preventive measures after this event, and took as hostages all male members of Vešovićs family and many of his notable friends, including Janko Vukotić. They began with mass interning of Montenegrin population. Eventually they killed his brother Vlajko after this event, and interned his two daughters, Desanka and Zorka, who were first of many Montenegrin females interned during WWI.

Vešović joined irregular units (comitadji) who struggled against occupying forces and hid in their ranks, without actually participating in their actions. Austro-Hungarian authorities kept up to 45,000 soldiers in Montenegro and used additional forces composed of Muslims and Albanians to struggle against the chetas of comitiadji. They urged Vešović to surrender and guaranteed that they would spare his life. Vešović became tired from hiding within different guerrilla groups and decided to surrender on 1 January 1918. After he surrendered, Vešović followed the wishes of the governor of Montenegro and began a campaign to convince comitadji irregulars to stop their actions, which resulted in loss of what remained of his prestige. When authorities realized that they can not use him for their aims, they interned Vešović near Graz.

== After World War I ==
After the World War I and unification of Montenegro and Serbia, Vešović was one of four generals of former Montenegrin army who was accepted as general of new Army of Kingdom of Serbs, Croats and Slovenes. At the beginning of 1919 he was sent to serve in the Command of III army in Skoplje, with rank General of Division .

Being strong supporter of the Montenegrin Petrović dynasty, he refused to pledge his loyalty to Karađorđević dynasty, which together with some speech he held in Andrijevica, resulted with his arrest in 1919 and tryal in Zemun in 1921. According to some sources he planned an uprising which would rely on Italy against Karađorđević dynasty and in favor of former Montenegrin king Petrović.

In the early 1920s Yugoslav newspapers Vešović was considered as leader of Montenegrin federalists on elections for state parliament, until they submitted final lists of candidates in which Vešović was candidate for Andrijevica county while leader of list was Mihailo Ivanović. Vešović tried to appoint his list for Peć (Metohija County) and Berane County, but failed to gain enough support of local population. Among the supporters of Montenegrin Federalists, he was particularly popular among former military officers of Montenegrin Royal Army. Vešović was a personification of this part of the population, unsatisfied with their treatment in the newly formed army, who demanded their rights.

== Legacy ==
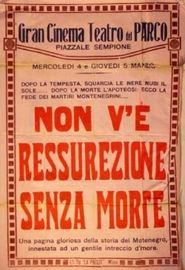
Vešović was one of main characters of the 1922 silent movie There Is No Resurrection Without Death

Vešović was one of the most important Serb characters of Albanian poetry, besides Marko Miljanov and Savo Lazarević.

Vešović was one of the main characters in a silent movie titled There Is No Resurrection Without Death (Serbian: Vaskrsenja ne biva bez smrti) which had its premiere on 14 April 1922 in Volturno, Rome.

In July 1941, during the suppression of the Uprising in Montenegro, the leaders of Albanian irregulars inspired them to kill and plunder populated places in Vasojevići region, reminding them how Vešović plundered many Northern Albanian villages during his attack on Scutari in the First Balkan War.

In 2001 RTCG produced a documentary drama Sudjenje djeneralu Vesovicu (transl. Trial to General Vešović) directed by Gojko Kastratović.

== Sources ==
- Otte, T.G. (15 April 2016). An Historian in Peace and War: The Diaries of Harold Temperley. Routledge. ISBN 978-1-317-18193-4.
- Mitrović, Andrej (2007). Serbia's Great War, 1914-1918. Purdue University Press. ISBN 978-1-55753-477-4.
- Ružić, Jevto A. (1955). Crna Gora u ratovima 1912-1918 i u poratnoj istoriji: Jevto A. Ružić. Avala.
- Škerović, Nikola P. (2004). Crna Gora za vrijeme Prvog svjetskog rata: odnosi sa Srbijom, kapitulacija. Službeni list Srbije i Crne Gore. ISBN 9788649502031.
- Perović, Branko (1960). Prvi balkanski rat, 1912-1913: knj. Operacije crnogorske vojske. Vojnoistorijski institut (Belgrade, Serbia).
- Milatović, Arso (1990). Kosmet: 1935-1945 : moje svedočenje. Naučna knjiga. ISBN 9788623700859.
- Srejović, Dragoslav; Gavrilović, Slavko; Ćirković, Sima M. (1983). Istorija srpskog naroda: knj. Od Berlinskog kongresa do ujedinjenja, 1878-1918 (2 v.). Srpska književna zadruga.
- Čolaković, Zlatan; Čirgić, Adnan (2008). The Epics of Avdo Međedović. Almanah. ISBN 9788685557071.
- Hrabak, Bogumil (1988). Arbanaški upadi i pobune na Kosovu i u Makedoniji od kraja 1912. do kraja 1915. godine: nacionalno nerazvijeni i nejedinstveni Arbanasi kao oruđe u rukama zainteresovanih država. Narodni muzej.
- Király, Béla K.; Rothenberg, Gunther E. (1987). War and Society in East Central Europe: East Central European Society and the Balkan Wars. Brooklyn College Press. ISBN 978-0-88033-099-2.
- Rakočević, Novica (1997). Crna Gora u prvom svjetskom ratu, 1914-1918. Unireks. ISBN 9788642705835.
- Čubrilović, Vasa; Čulinović, Ferdo (1969). Naučni skup: u povodu 50-godišnjice raspada Austro-Ugarske monarhije i stvaranja Jugoslavenske države : Zagreb, 27-28. prosinca 1968. godine. Jugoslovenska akademija znanosti i umjetnosti.
- Pejović, Đoko D. (1973). Politika Crne Gore u Zatarju i gornjem Polimlju 1878-1912. Istorijski institut.
- Škerović, Nikola P. (1964). Crna Gora na osvitku xx [i.e. dvadesetog] vijeka. Naučno delo.
- Rastoder, Šerbo (2000). Političke stranke i Crnoj Gori 1918-1929. Conteco-Bar.
- Petrović, Rastislav V. (2005). Crnogorske ustaše. Autor agent. ISBN 9788680595108.
