= Sohorab Ali Sana =

Bangladeshi politician

Member of Bangladesh Parliament

Personal details
- Born: 1 February 1946 (age 79) Khulna District
- Party: Bangladesh Awami League

Sohorab Ali Sana (born 1 February 1946) is a Bangladesh Awami League politician and a former member of parliament for Khulna-6.

== Career ==
Sana was elected to parliament from Khulna-6 as a Bangladesh Awami League candidate in 2008.
