= M. A. Bari (Khulna politician) =

Bangladeshi politician

Member of the Bangladesh Parliament for Khulna-6
- In office 1973–1975
- Succeeded by: Khan A. Sabur

Personal details
- Party: Bangladesh Awami League

M. A. Bari is a politician from the Bagerhat District of Bangladesh and an elected a member of parliament from Khulna-6.

== Career ==
Bari was elected to parliament from Khulna-6 as an Awami League candidate in 1973 Bangladeshi general election.
