= Sheikh Md. Nurul Haque =

Bangladeshi politician (1940–2020)

Sheikh Md Nurul Haque

Member of Parliament

Personal details
- Born: 15 November 1940 British Raj
- Died: 29 July 2020 (aged 79) Dhaka, Bangladesh
- Party: Bangladesh Awami League

Sheikh Md Nurul Haque (15 November 1940 – 29 July 2020) was a Bangladesh Awami League politician and a Member of Parliament from Khulna-6.

== Early life ==
Haque was born on 15 November 1940. He completed his law degree from the University of Dhaka.

== Career ==
Haque was elected to Parliament on 5 January 2014 from Khulna-6 as a Bangladesh Awami League candidate. His son, Sheikh Md Monirul Islam, has been accused of trying to grab land in Khulna in 2017. He lost the Bangladesh Awami League nomination for the next general election.

== Death ==
On 29 July 2020, Nurul Haque died in Dhaka at the age of 79 due to complications brought on by COVID-19 during the COVID-19 pandemic in Bangladesh.
