= Momen Uddin Ahmed =

Bangladeshi politician

Momin Uddin Ahmed
- মোমিনউদ্দিন আহমেদ

Minister of Education
- In office 9 July 1986 – 30 November 1986
- Preceded by: M.A. Matin
- Succeeded by: Mahbubur Rahman

State Minister of Power
- In office 18 February 1986 – 9 July 1986

Member of Parliament for Khulna-6
- In office 7 May 1986 – 3 March 1988

Member of Parliament for Khulna-7
- In office 7 March 1973 – 6 November 1976

Personal details
- Party: Jatiya Party (Ershad)
- Other political affiliations: Bangladesh Awami League

Momen Uddin Ahmed is a Khulna politician who was a minister, member of parliament, and organizer in the Bangladesh Liberation War.

== Career ==
In the inaugural parliamentary elections of 1973, Ahmed secured a seat as a member of parliament representing the Khulna-7 constituency, running under the banner of the Bangladesh Awami League. Following his election, Ahmed assumed the role of minister of state for flood control, water resources, and power within the cabinet of Khondaker Mostaq Ahmad, serving from 20 August 1975, to 8 November 1975.. In the third parliamentary elections of 1986, he was elected a member of parliament from Khulna-6 constituency after being nominated by the Jatiya Party. He served as the state minister of power in the cabinet of President Hussain Mohammad Ershad. Ahmed served the minister of education of Bangladesh from 9 July 1986 to 30 November 1986.
