= Shah Md. Ruhul Quddus =

Bangladeshi politician

Member of Bangladesh Parliament

Personal details
- Party: Bangladesh Jamaat-e-Islami

Shah Md. Ruhul Quddus is a politician of the Bangladesh Jamaat-e-Islami and a former member of parliament for Khulna-6.

== Career ==
Quddus was elected to parliament from Khulna-6 as a Bangladesh Jamaat-e-Islami candidate in 1991 and 2001.
