= Md. Rashiduzzaman =

Bangladeshi politician

Member of the Bangladesh Parliament for Khulna-6
- In office 30 January 2024 – 6 August 2024
- Preceded by: Akhteruzzaman Babu

Personal details
- Born: 1 March 1961 (age 64)
- Party: Awami League

Md. Rashiduzzaman (born 1 March 1961) is a Awami League politician and a former Jatiya Sangsad member representing the Khulna-6 constituency served in 2024.

== Career ==
Rashiduzzaman was elected to parliament from Khulna-6 as an Awami League candidate on 7 January 2024. He was arrested in October 2024 following the fall of the Sheikh Hasina led Awami League government.
