= Jennifer D. Keene =

American historian (born 1962)

- Education: George Washington University; Carnegie Mellon University
- Occupation: Historian
- Employer: Chapman University

Jennifer D. Keene is an American historian who has written multiple books about World War I.

== Education ==
Keene attended George Washington University, where she earned both her B.A. and M.A. degrees. She attended Carnegie Mellon University for her Ph.D.

== Career ==
Keene received the Wang-Franklin Professorship for 2007–09, the highest faculty award given by Chapman University. She is currently the chair of the history department at Chapman.

== Selected publications ==
- The United States and the First World War. Routledge. 2000. ISBN 0582356202.
- Doughboys, the Great War and the Remaking of America. Johns Hopkins University Press. 2001. ISBN 0801865921.
- World War I. The Daily Life Through History Series: American Soldiers' Lives. Greenwood Press. 2006. ISBN 0313331812.
- Visions of America: A History of the United States. Prentice Hall. 2010. ISBN 0321066871. OCLC 277205367. Co-authored with Saul Cornell and Edward T. O'Donnell.
- World War I: The American Soldier Experience. University of Nebraska Press. 2011. ISBN 978-0803234871.
- Finding Common Ground: New Directions in First World War Studies. Brill, Leiden. 2011. ISBN 978-9004191822. Co-edited with Michael S. Neiberg.
- Visions of America: A History of the United States (2nd ed.). Pearson. 2012. ISBN 0205092667. Co-authored with Saul Cornell and Edward T. O'Donnell.
- Visions of America: A History of the United States (3rd ed.). Pearson. 2017. ISBN 0205999727. Co-authored with Saul Cornell and Edward T. O'Donnell.
- The United States and the First World War (2nd ed.). Routledge. 2021. ISBN 0367363844.
