= Janko Vukotić =

Montenegrin and Yugoslav general, serdar and politician

- Јанко Вукотић
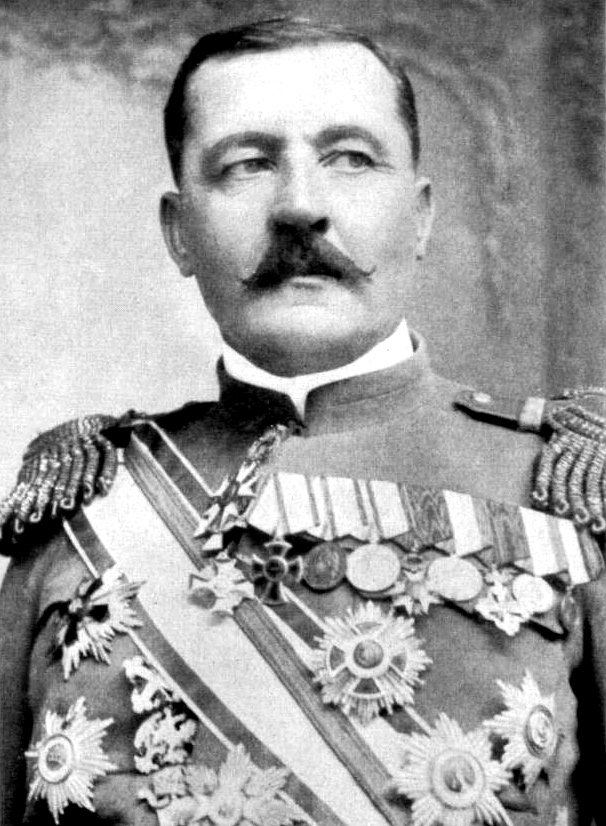

3rd Prime Minister of Kingdom of Montenegro
- In office 6 May 1913 – 25 December 1915 (Note: Since 16 July 1915 Minister without portfolio. Risto Popović, Minister of Finance and Defence, was interim Prime Minister since 17 July 1915, and Mirko Mijušković alongside him since 3 October 1915)
- Monarch: Nicholas I
- Preceded by: Mitar Martinović
- Succeeded by: Lazar Mijušković (Note: Risto Popović as acting Prime Minister)

5th Minister of Foreign Affairs of Kingdom of Montenegro
- In office 9 September 1915 – 2 January 1916 (Note: When World War I started and he was on military camp, he was represented by Mirko Mijušković in the Ministry of Foreign Affairs since 3 October 1915)
- Monarch: Nicholas I
- Prime Minister: Himself
- Preceded by: Petar Plamenac
- Succeeded by: Lazar Mijušković

2nd Minister of War of the Principality of Montenegro
- In office 19 December 1905 – 24 November 1906
- Monarch: Nicholas I
- Prime Minister: Lazar Mijušković
- Preceded by: Ilija Plamenac
- Succeeded by: Danilo Gatalo

4th and 6th Minister of War of the Kingdom of Montenegro
- In office 23 August 1911 – 19 June 1912
- Monarch: Nicholas I
- Prime Minister: Lazar Tomanović
- Preceded by: Marko Đukanović
- Succeeded by: Mitar Martinović
- In office 8 May 1913 – 16 July 1915 (Note: When WW1 started and he was on military camp, he was represented by Risto Popović in the Ministry of War since 17 July 1914)
- Prime Minister: Himself
- Preceded by: Mitar Martinović
- Succeeded by: Mašan Božović
- Minister of War: Himself (Note: Alongside Risto Popović since 17 July 1914); Mašan Božović; Radomir Vešović

Personal details
- Born: 18 February 1866 Čevo, Principality of Montenegro
- Died: 4 February 1927 (age 60) Belgrade, Kingdom of Serbs, Croats and Slovenes
- Resting place: Belgrade New Cemetery

Military service
- Branch/service: Royal Montenegrin Army; Royal Yugoslav Army
- Rank: Army General
- Battles/wars: Balkan Wars; World War I

Janko Vukotić (Serbian Cyrillic: Јанко Вукотић; 18 February 1866 – 4 February 1927) was a Montenegrin serdar who served in the militaries of Montenegro and the Kingdom of Yugoslavia. He led the Kingdom of Montenegro's military during World War I and was interned as a prisoner of war after the country surrendered.

== Early life ==
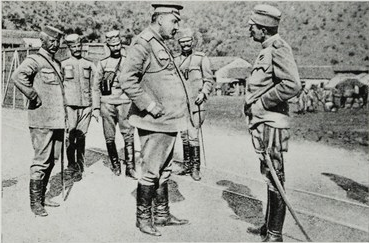
Vukotić meets with Field Marshal Petar Bojović

Janko Vukotić was born in Čevo, Principality of Montenegro, on 18 February 1866. He was a member of the Vukotić brotherhood and related to Petar Vukotić and Milena of Montenegro. He studied at the lower gymnasium at Cetinje, and at the Military Academy of Modena in Italy.

== Career ==
Vukotić was promoted to brigadier in 1902, and was promoted to division officer, the highest rank in the Montenegrin army, in 1914. During the First Balkan War he commanded the eastern detachment of the army, The Decan detachment, which was led by Vukotić during the Second Balkan War. He was a delegate to the peace negotiations that produced the Treaty of Bucharest.

From 1905 to 1914, Vukotić served on the State Council. In 1906, Vukotić was appointed as Minister of War. From 6 May 1913 to 25 December 1915, he was Prime Minister of Montenegro. He was Minister of War in his own cabinet starting in June 1915, and Minister of Foreign Affairs starting in September.

During the Bosnian Crisis Vukotić went to Belgrade to discuss an alliance between Montenegro and Serbia. He later attempted to form an alliance with the Ottoman Empire against Austria-Hungary, but failed. The British opposed this plan.

Vukotić was chief of staff of the Supreme Command of Montenegro's army during World War I. Montenegro was losing the war and Austria-Hungary demanded unconditional surrender. Vukotić delivered Order No. 128 on 21 January 1916, which directed for the army to be dismissed. 15,000 Montenegrins were taken as prisoners of war. Vukotić was interned at the Hungarian Boldogason, then the Austrian Karlštajn, before being sent to Osijek.

The annexation of Montenegro into the Kingdom of Yugoslavia was supported by Vukotić. He opposed the Christmas Uprising. He was given the rank of general in the Royal Yugoslav Army in 1919. Alexander I of Yugoslavia promoted him to army general in 1926.

== Personal life ==
Vukotić's daughter, Vasilija Vukotić, served the army during World War I and fought at the Battle of Mojkovac. He died in Belgrade on 4 February 1927.

== Works cited ==
=== Books ===
- Martinović, Niko (1957). Janko Vukotić i kapitulacije Crne Gore 1916 godine.

=== Journals ===
- Schmitt, Bernadotte (1931). "The Bosnian Annexation Crisis (III)". The Slavonic and East European Review. 10 (39). Modern Humanities Research Association: 408–419. JSTOR 4202677.

=== News ===
- Adžić, Novak. "Janko Vukotić – od crnogorskog vojskovođe do ađutanta kralja Aleksandra". Portal Analitika. Archived from the original on 11 July 2025.

=== Web ===
- Mladenović, Božica (8 October 2014). "Women's Mobilization for War (South East Europe)". 1914–1918 Online. Archived from the original on 11 July 2025.
- Raspopović, Radoslav (8 October 2014). "Montenegro". 1914–1918 Online. Archived from the original on 2 July 2025.
- Tasić, Dmitar (8 October 2014). "Warfare 1914–1918 (South East Europe)". 1914–1918 Online. Archived from the original on 11 July 2025.
