= Obilić Medal =

Medal for Bravery "Miloš Obilić"
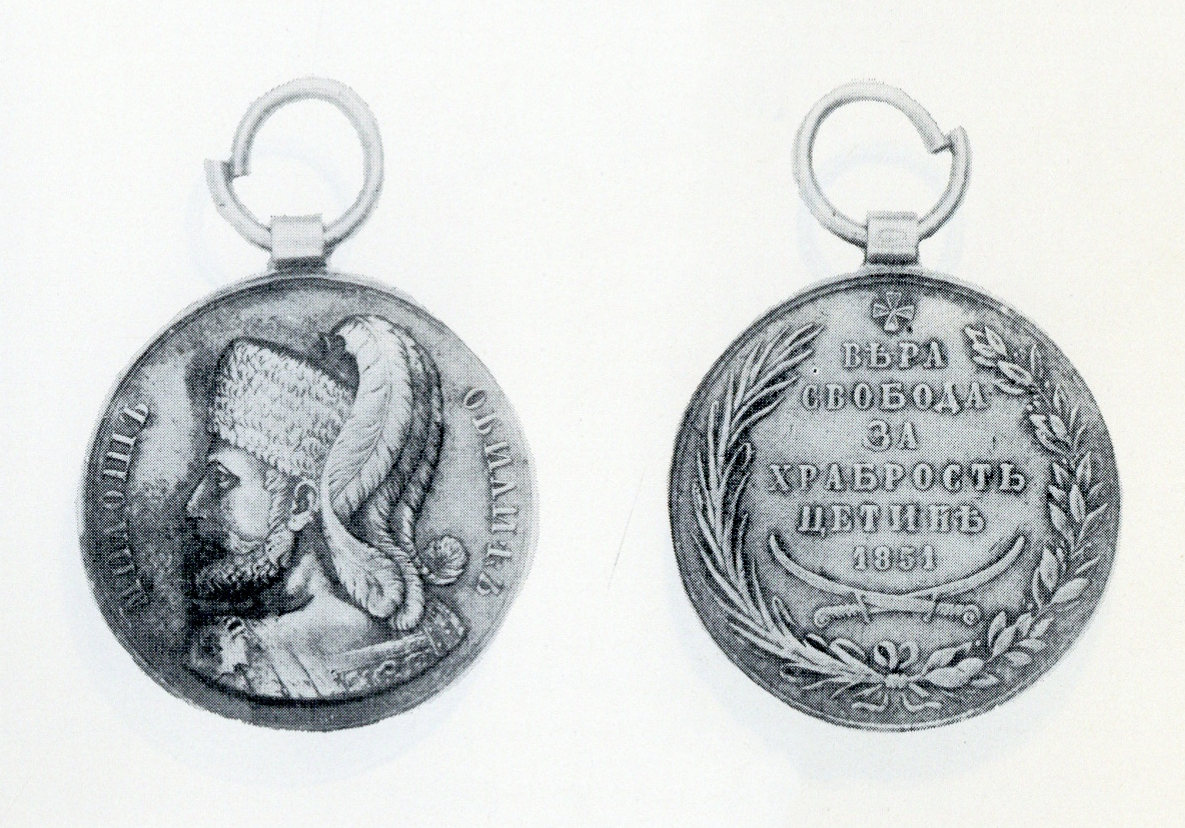
- Country: Prince-Bishopric of Montenegro
- Established: 1847

The Obilić Medal (Serbian: Обилића медаља) or Medal for Bravery "Miloš Obilić" was a medal established by Petar II Petrović-Njegoš as the highest military decoration in Montenegro, based on the cult of national hero Miloš Obilić.

The official name of the medal was the Medal for Bravery "Miloš Obilić" but it was known as Obilić Medal.

It was established in 1847 and granted to soldiers for the acts of great personal courage, or for personal courage demonstrated on the battlefield, prepared for the movement for liberation and revenge of the Kosovo Battle. Another reason for introduction of this medal by Njegoš was his wish to make warfare against the Ottomans more civilized (to replace customary collection and exhibition of body parts of killed Muslim enemies).

Milan Rešetar was first of many authors who published his belief that the face of Miloš Obilić found on the Medal depicts Njegoš himself.

In 1847, Njegoš decorated Count Grujica (Serbian: Кнез Грујица) with golden Obilić Medal shortly before he died and was buried in front of Vlach Church on Cetinje.

== Sources ==
- Lopičić, Janko K. (1973). Lopićići bratstvo u Ceklinu (Crna Gora), 1450-1970: prilog istoriji plemena Ceklina. Obod.
- Durković-Jakšić, Ljubomir (1974). Njegoševa pripovetka. Univerzitetska biblioteka Svetozar Marković.
