= Mitar Martinović =

Prime Minister of Montenegro (1870–1954)

- Митар Мартиновић
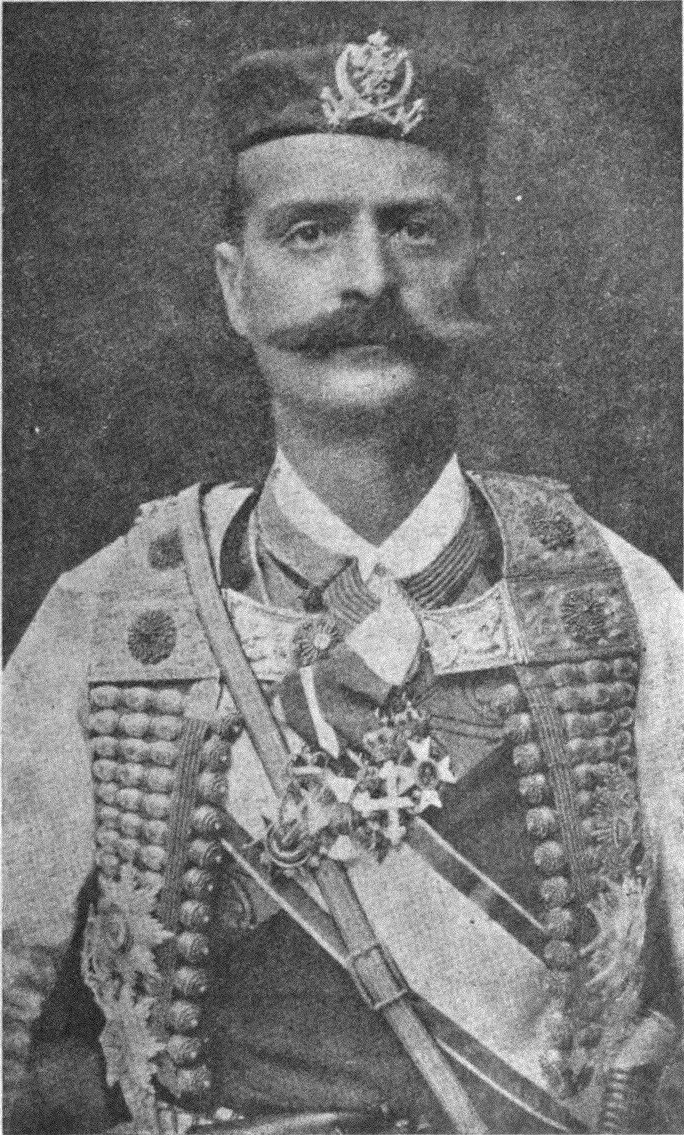
- Mitar Martinović in 1912

2nd Prime Minister of Kingdom of Montenegro
- In office 19 June 1912 – 8 May 1913
- Monarch: Nicholas I
- Preceded by: Lazar Tomanović
- Succeeded by: Janko Vukotić

3rd Minister of Foreign Affairs of Kingdom of Montenegro
- In office 19 June 1912 – 8 May 1913
- Monarch: Nicholas I
- Prime Minister: Himself
- Preceded by: Lazar Tomanović
- Succeeded by: Petar Plamenac

5th Minister of War of Principality of Montenegro
- In office 17 April 1907 – 28 August 1910
- Monarch: Nicholas I
- Prime Minister: Lazar Tomanović
- Preceded by: Andrija Radović
- Succeeded by: Himself (as Minister of War of Kingdom of Montenegro)

1st and 5th Minister of War of Kingdom of Montenegro
- In office 28 August – 14 September 1910
- Monarch: Nicholas I
- Prime Minister: Lazar Tomanović
- Preceded by: Himself (as Minister of War of Principality of Montenegro)
- Succeeded by: Ivo Đurović
- In office 19 June 1912 – 8 May 1913
- Monarch: Nicholas I
- Prime Minister: Himself
- Preceded by: Janko Vukotić
- Succeeded by: Janko Vukotić

Commander of Lovćen Detachment
- In office 28 August 1910 – 20 January 1916 Serving with Luka Gojnić, Janko Vukotić and Radomir Vešović
- Commander-in-chief: Nicholas I
- Ministers of War: Himself; Ivo Đurović; Marko Đukanović; Janko Vukotić; Himself; Janko Vukotić; Mašan Božović; Radomir Vešović

Leader of True People's Party
- In office 1907–1918 Serving with Jovan Plamenac and Lazar Mijušković

Personal details
- Born: 8 September 1870 Bajice, Cetinje, Principality of Montenegro
- Died: 11 February 1954 (83 years) Belgrade, Federal People's Republic of Yugoslavia
- Party: True People's Party
- Children: Olga (daughter)
- Occupation: Politician and military
- Cabinet: Government of Mitar Martinović
- Awards: Order of Prince Danilo I Order of the Crown of Italy; Legion of Honour; Order of Saint Vladimir with swords

Military service
- Allegiance: Prussia; Germany; Serbia; Serbia; Montenegro; Yugoslavia
- Branch/service: Royal Montenegrin Army; Royal Yugoslav Army
- Years of service: 1907-1921
- Rank: General and divisional general
- Battles/wars: First Balkan War; Second Balkan War; WW1

Mitar Martinović (Serbian Cyrillic: Митар Мартиновић; 8 September 1870 – 11 February 1954) was a Montenegrin vojvoda and divisional general in the Yugoslav Royal Army. He was a short-term Prime Minister of Montenegro from 19 June 1912 to 8 May 1913, being succeeded by Serdar Janko Vukotić.

Martinović was one of the founders of the Royalist True People's Party in 1906. He was Prime Minister of the Kingdom of Montenegro between 1912 and 1913, and a Minister of the Military on two occasions (1907–1910, and 1912–1913).
