= Andrija Balović =

Roman Catholic priest, historian, writer, translator and theologian

Andrija Balović (Perast, Montenegro, 18 May 1721 – Perast, 28 July 1784) was a Roman Catholic priest, historian, writer, translator and theologian, native of Montenegro.

== Biography ==
Born in Perast to a well-known patrician household Balovići, a family with six children. Andrija was the son of Marko Balović, and brother of Josip Balović, also the nephew of Julije Balović.

He attended the Roman Catholic seminary in Dalmatian city of Zadar. In Loreto, he studied theology at the Illyrian College, where he obtained a doctorate in philosophy and theology. He was a priest in Risan since 1753. After 1766, until his death, he was the abbot of St. George and the parish priest in his native Perast.

He translated church songs and religious works into Serbo-Croatian. He is also important as a copyist of the works of writers Vicko Zmajević and Serafin Crijević.

Balović's contribution to historical science is a short history of Dalmatia, which he wrote in Italian in 1750. His most important Italian work, however, is the Annali di Pirusto (Annals of Perast), an overview of the history of the city of Perast in Italian, but the real title is Historia della valorosa Nobile Nazione Pirustina, del Seno Rezonnico e della Dalmazia Superiore, ò sia Croatia rubea or in English "The History of the Brave Noble Perast People, from the Gulf of Risan and Upper Dalmatia, or Red Croatia". He was encouraged to write the Annals by Josip Bronza.

== Sources ==
- Old Boka literature. Old Serbo-Croatian writers from Kotor, Perast, Dobrota, Prčanj and Budva / S. Prosperov Novak, Matica hrvatska, Zagreb, 1996.
- Balović, Andrija, Croatian encyclopedia
- Redakcija (1983): Balović, Hrvatski biografski leksikon
- Radaus, Tatjana (1983); Balović, Julije, Croatian Biographical Lexicon, LZMK
- Foretić, Vinko (1989): Bronza, Croatian Biographical Lexicon, LZMK
