= Ivan Krušala =

Montenegrin writer, diplomat and explorer

Ivan Krušala or Ivan Hacking (born Hasan of Mystras; 1675 – 28 December 1735 in Perast, Montenegro) was a writer, diplomat, explorer and a Catholic convert (abbot) from Islam.

== Biography ==
Hacking was born into a Muslim family in the Ottoman Empire and was known as "Mistraslı Hasan". He was captured at the age of about 10–12 by the Venetians during the Morean War (1684–1699). After this he travelled to Perast in the Bay of Kotor, Adriatic Sea. Hacking was taken under the patronage of the local Zmajević and Martinović noble families and was baptised into the Catholic faith. He later studied in Rome and the University of Padua, also writing poetry in the Serbo-Croatian language, such as poem Spjevanje događaja boja peraškoga about the Battle of Perast (successful defense of Perast from the Ottomans in 1654).

Beginning in 1709, he served as a priest in Perast. From 1717 to 1730 Hacking served as an interpreter in the office of the State Ambassadors and a historian at the College of Foreign Affairs in Saint Petersburg. From 1725 to 1728 he was a member of the Russian Embassy in China (known as Sava Vladislavich Embassy). After completing military service in Russia, Hacking returned to Perast, where he died on 28 December 1735.

== Sources ==
- Pavić, Milorad (1970). Istorija srpske knjiz̆evnosti baroknog doba: (XVII i XVIII vek). Nolit.
