= Mato Pižurica =

Mato Pižurica (born 14 September 1942) is a Serbian linguist and professor at the Faculty of Philosophy in Novi Sad. Pižurica is best known as the chief editor of several official orthography books for Serbian, and as the secretary of the Department of Language and Literature of Matica srpska.

Pižurica was born in the village of Velje Duboko near Kolašin, Montenegro and graduated in 1967 at the Faculty of Philosophy in Novi Sad, and finished post graduate studies at the University of Belgrade in 1973. He received his PhD in 1987 at the Faculty of Philosophy in Novi Sad.

Pižurica is a member of the international committee of the Slavic Linguistic Atlas, national committees of for the General Carpathian dialectal atlas, committee for the Serbian dialectal atlas, several committees of the Serbian Academy of Sciences and Arts (Committee for the standardization of the Serbian language, Committee for the dictionary of SANU, Committee for etymology, Committee for Onomastics), several editorial committees (Jezik danas). Pižurica is a member of the Board of Directors of Matica srpska, secretary of Department of Language and Literature of Matica srpska, and a Vice Dean for Education at the Faculty of philosophy in Novi Sad.

He participated on numerous domestic and international conferences (onomastics, linguistic geography, lexicology etc.). Pižurica authored about hundred papers, treatises and reviews in the history of Serbian literary and spoken language, dialectology, onomastics, standardology and linguistic geography. He edited Pavle Ivić's book Serbo-Croatian dialects (Srpskohrvatski dijalekti; Celokupna dela, vol. III).

== Bibliography ==
- Govor okoline Kolašina, CANU, Posebna izdanja, knj. 12, Titograd, 1981, p. 251
- Jezik Andrije Zmajevića, CANU, osebna izdanja, knj. 22, Titograd, 1989, p. 434
- Prilozi Pravopisu, Matica srpska, Novi Sad, 1989, p. 127 (co-authored and co-edited, in Ekavian and Ijekavian editions)
- Pravopis srpskoga jezika, Matica srpska, Novi Sad, 1993, strp510 (as one of three authors, in Ijekavian and Ekavian editions; Ekavian version has been reprinted two times)
- Pravopis srpskoga jezika (school edition), Matica srpska, Novi Sad, 1995, p. 332 (as one of the three authors, in Ekavian and Ijekavian editions; Ekavian version has been reprinted two times, Ijekavian once)
- Pravopis srpskoga jezika – Priručnik za škole, Beograd – Novi Sad (co-authored, in Ekavian and Ijekavian editions koautor; Ekavian version has been reprinted)
- Ljetopis crkovni Andrije Zmajevića, knjiga I, p. 560, knjiga II, p. 547, Cetinje, 1996.
