= Tripo Kokolja =

Dalmatian painter

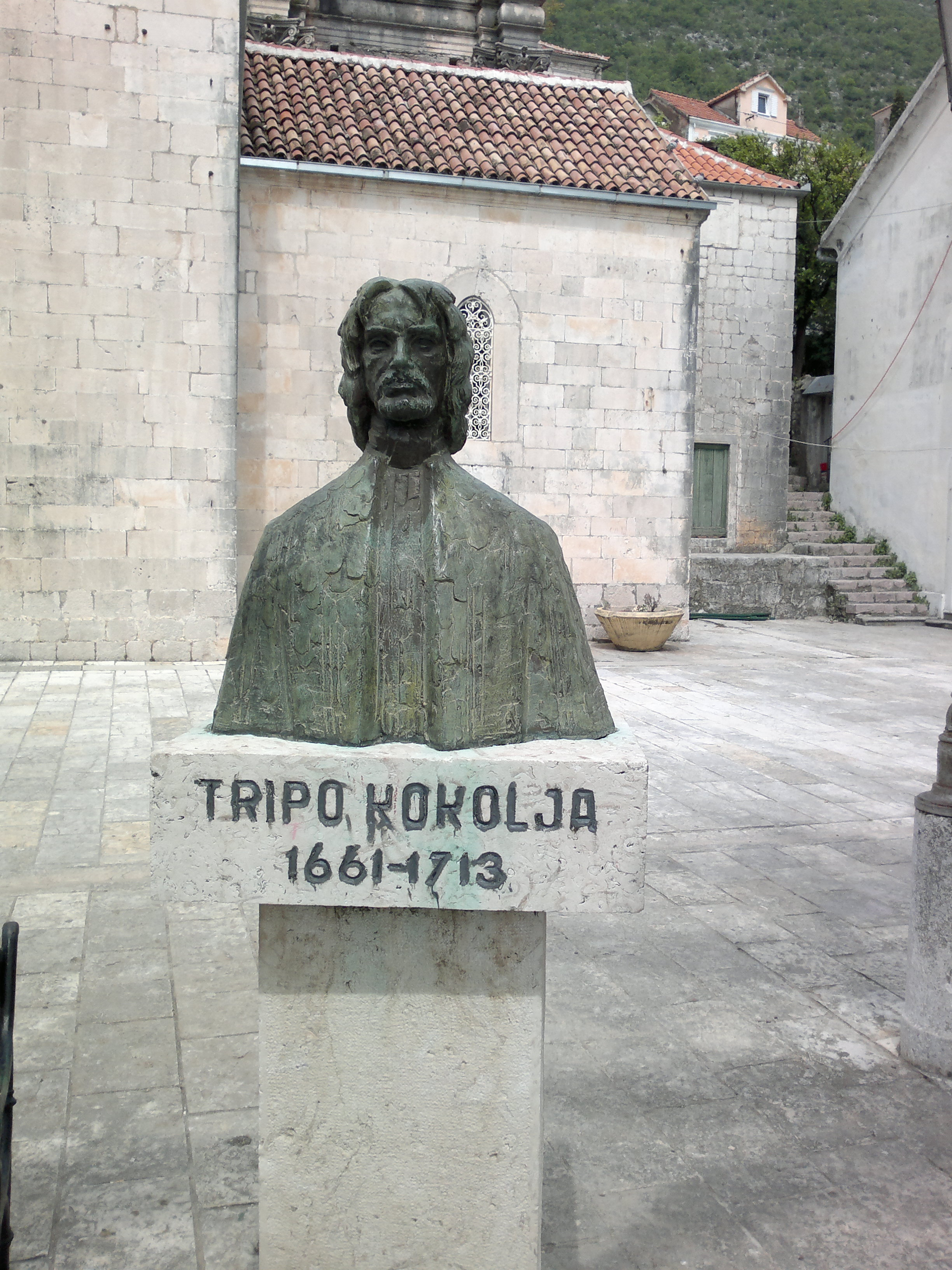
- Bust of Tripo Kokolja in Perast
- Born: 28 February 1661; Perasto, Republic of Venice
- Died: 18 October 1713 (aged 52); Curzola, Republic of Venice
- Other name: Trifone Cocchiglia
- Known for: Painting

Tripo Kokolja also known as Trifone Cocchiglia (28 February 1661 – 18 October 1713) was a Dalmatian painter from the Bay of Kotor. He is chiefly remembered today for introducing still life and landscape painting into the art of the eastern Adriatic.

== Life and work ==
Born in Perast, on the Bay of Kotor in the Republic of Venice (present-day Montenegro), Kokolja is believed to have studied art in Venice.

His most important work was a commission from the Archbishop of Bar, Andrija Zmajević, done at the end of the 17th century. This was a cycle of canvases for the church of Our Lady of the Rocks, opposite Perast, based on instructions of Andrija Zmajević. The lower series of paintings depicts prophets and sibyls; Above these are the Presentation of the Virgin, the Death of the Virgin and the Descent of the Holy Ghost. Above the arch is the Coronation of the Virgin. The ceiling is painted, divided into 45 sections which depict scenes from the Life of the Virgin interspersed with images of evangelists, Fathers of the Church, angels and still lifes of baskets of flowers. These paintings combine certain hallmarks of Baroque technique with a provincial understanding of both drawing and perspective. They were badly restored by a local Franciscan painter, Giuseppe Rossi, in 1883.

Other works by Kokolja include portraits of Vicko Bujović and admiral Krsto Zmajević, both of which are in the town museum, along with a self-portrait. A set of wall paintings in Archbishop Zmajevic's palace, done in 1670, is ruined, but is known to have included landscapes.

Kokolja moved to Korčula in the Republic of Venice (present-day Croatia) towards the end of his life, following the death of his friend Vicko Bujović, dying there in 1713. Among his later works are paintings for the Dominican church in Bol on the island of Brač.

== Annotations ==
1. His name is mostly spelt as Tripo Kokolja and Serbian Cyrillic: Трипо Кокоља, but also Trifun Kokoljić and Italian: Trifone Cocchiglia.
