= Vicko Bujović =

Venetian military commander (1660–1709)

Vicko Bujović (1660 – May 6, 1709) was a Venetian military commander and captain of Perast.

== Life ==
During the Morean War, Bujović took command of the forces of Perast, offering their services, in his own name and that of the people of the city, to the Republic of Venice, with whom he was deeply connected. The Venetians rewarded him well, enabling him to keep living in luxury; he built a palace and maintained a personal guard. In 1695 he assisted in an attack on Trebinje and fought as well against north African pirates. Between 1694 and 1708 he was repeatedly elected a leader of the town. His palace was finished in 1694; on March 28, 1704, he was made a duke.

Bujović provoked a quarrel with the Zmajević family, prominent locally, when he fled to Dubrovnik with the daughter of an Ottoman agha and had a child with her out of wedlock, who had been committed to the care of Krsto Zmajević; he spent several years in that town before returning to Perast. During her stay in Dubrovnik Agha's daughter converted to Catholicism and took the name Jela. The two later got married, their best man being a notable painter Tripo Kokolja. On May 6, 1709, Vicko was provoked into and killed in a street fight by a member of the Stukanović family. For his involvement in the fight, Matija Zmajević was forced to leave Perast, eventually taking up service with the Russian Empire.
