= Julije Balović =

Venetian polymath and naval officer

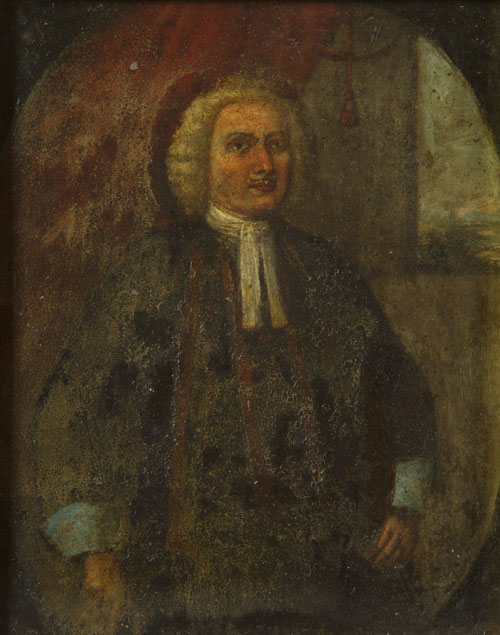
- Portrait of captain Julije Balović (end of the 17th century)
- Born: 24 March 1672; Perasto, Republic of Venice (now Perast, Montenegro)
- Died: 10 September 1727 (aged 55)
- Other names: Giulio Ballovich; Julius Balović
- Occupations: entrepreneur, judge, sea captain and collector of epic poetry
- Notable work: Pratichae Schrivaneschae, Perast Chronicle

Julije Balović or Giulio Ballovich (Serbo-Croatian Cyrillic: Јулије Баловић; 24 March 1672 – 10 September 1727) was an entrepreneur, polyglot, judge, sea captain Venetian military officer, and collector of epic poetry from Venetian held Perast (modern-day Montenegro). Some sources speculated that he authored some of the literature works he collected. Balović wrote several manuscripts which are considered as significant literature works and historical sources. His multilingual dictionary is one of the earliest records of Albanian.

Julije Balović belonged to the noble Balović family from Perast. Following his father's footsteps, he became a sailor in the Venetian navy and advanced from the rank of ship's scribe to shipmaster. He received numerous awards and gratitude letters for his successful participation in battles against pirates and Ottomans during the Ottoman–Venetian War (1714–18).

== Family ==
Balović was born into the noble Balović family and lived in Perast (modern-day Montenegro). His father was Matija Balović who had seven sons and two daughters. Balović was married to Ana and had three daughters and four sons. Two of their sons died at a young age (Petar and Antun) while remaining the two sons (Julije and Petar) had no children so Julije's branch of the Balović family ceased to exist.

== Sailing career ==
Balović began his sailing career in the Venetian navy as a ship's scribe and gradually advanced to the ranks of pilot, lieutenant, captain and finally shipmaster. He served on different ships including "Santa Croce", "Santa Antonio" and "Santa Cristoforo". Balović participated in numerous naval battles with pirates from Tripoli and Ulcinj near Durazzo and Šćedro and also in some larger military conflicts like Siege of Corfu, Battle of Preveza, Saseno and Battle of Vonjice. At the beginning of 1715 he was commander of frigate from Perast that together with ship of Venetian fleet commander Lorenzo Bragadin blocked two galleys of Ulcinj pirates from in one port in Venetian Albania. On that occasion, he demonstrated his perfect knowledge of the Albanian coast.

Balović was the second generation of honorary guards and the keepers of the doge's standard on the Venetian flagship, which was also the position held by his father Matija. For his merits Balović has received a numerous diplomas and gratitude letters from different Venetian authorities. His sailing career lasted until 1718.

== Literary career ==
While he was in Venetian quarantine in 1692 Balović transcribed Danica authored by Junije Palmotić. He amended his transcription with three poems of unknown authors, including "Blind man sings of love events" (Serbo-Croatian: Slijepac pjeva zgode koje ljubav nosi) and completed it on 16 February 1692.

In 1693 Balović wrote the Italian-language manuscript Pratichae Schrivaneschae, which contains a manual for scribes on ships. Two different versions were written. The shorter version, written in 1693, is preserved in the archive of the Archbishopric of Perast. This manuscript contains a calligraphic inscription of different alphabets including Latin, Cyrillic (Serviano) and Glagolitic (Slavo Illirico) and a multilingual dictionary of the most often used words in everyday life on Italian (478), Slavo-Illirico (468), Greek (241), Albanian (201), and Turkish language(83). The longer version, without a dictionary, was written in 1695 and is preserved in the Institute for Scientific and Artistic Work in Split.

At the end of 1714, Balović began writing the Perast Chronicle, a collection of epic poetry which describes historical events related to Perast in the period between 1511 and 1716. Although this manuscript has been a subject of significant scientific interest, it was never printed as a whole. It is assumed that Balović might be an author of one manuscript with transcriptions of official records and other documents, drawings of ships, short descriptions and legends related to events or ships drawn in this manuscript.

=== Bibliography ===
Balović's works include:

- Danica (1692) – transcription of Palmotić's work with three poems
- Pratichae Schrivaneschae (1693)
- Pratichae Schrivaneschae (1695)
- Perast Chronicle (1714–?)

== Legacy ==
The Croatian Encyclopedia describes him as a 'Croatian naval captain and chronicler' and notes that his Croatian-Italian dictionary was one of the first of its kind. The same description of the dictionary language is found in the Croatian Biographical Lexicon (published earlier, in Yugoslavia).

He is included in the History of the Serbian People published by the Serbian Literary Guild.

== Sources ==
- Pantić, Miroslav (1990). Književnost na tlu Crne Gore i Boke Kotorske od XVI do XVIII veka. Srpska književna zadruga. ISBN 9788637901907 – via Project Rastko.
