= Andrija Zmajević =

Archbishop and poet from modern-day Montenegro

Andrija Zmajević Андрија Змајевић
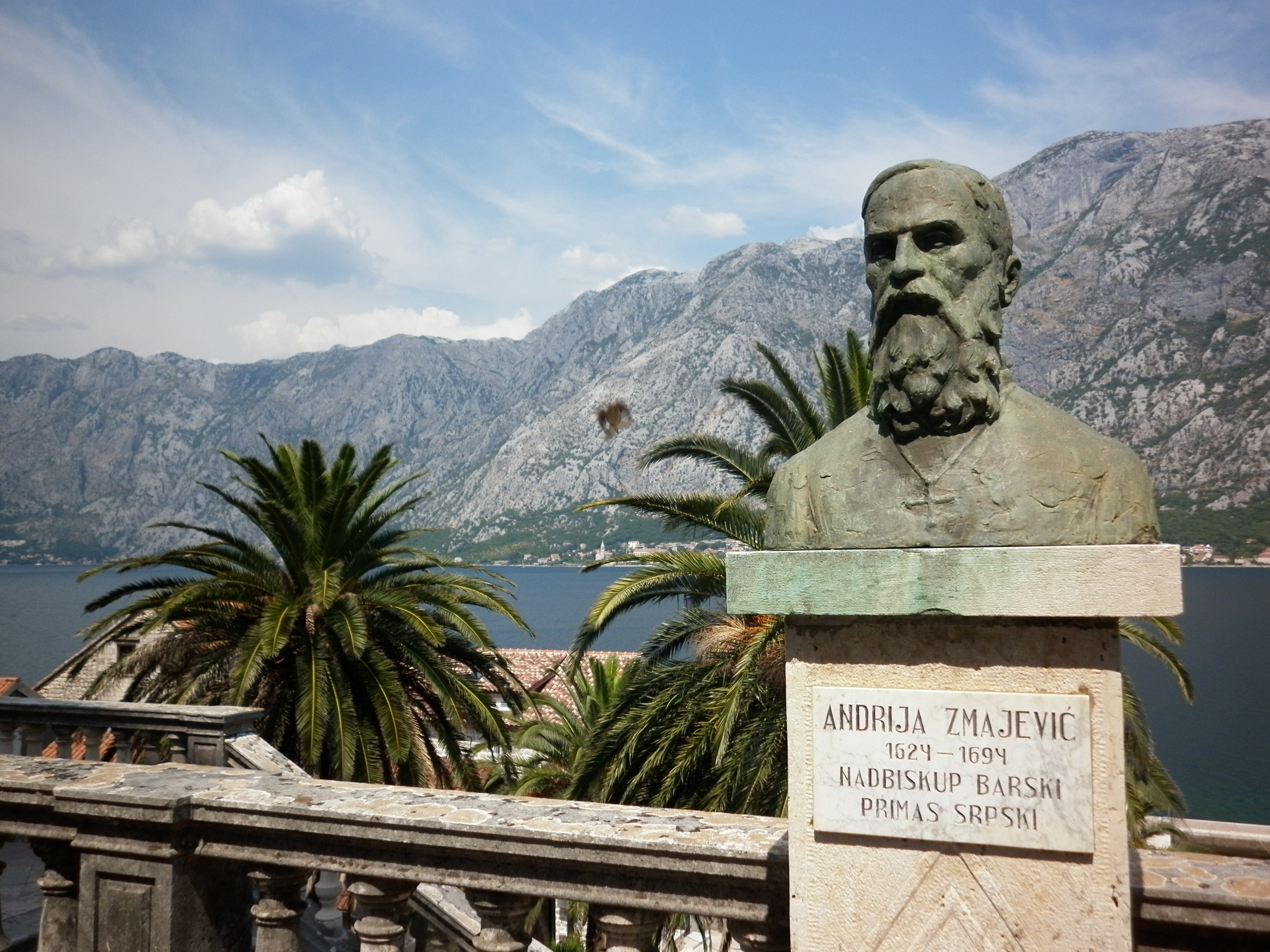
- Bust of Zmajević in Montenegro
- Born: 6 June 1628; Perasto, Republic of Venice (now Perast, Montenegro)
- Died: 7 September 1694 (aged 66)
- Occupations: archbishop, theologian, poet
- Notable work: Ljetopis crkovni, Slovinskoj Dubravi, Boj Peraški

Andrija Zmajević (Cyrillic: Андрија Змајевић; 6 June 1628 - 7 September 1694) was a Baroque poet, Archbishop of Antivari, and Catholic theologian.

== Biography ==
The Zmajević family hailed from Vrba, a village from the region of the Njeguši tribe; when the last members of the Crnojević family left the Principality of Zeta, Nikola Zmajević and his cousins Ivaniš and Vučeta moved to Kotor, at the beginning of the 16th century. There, they quickly converted from Eastern Orthodoxy in favor of Roman Catholicism, by marrying "Latin" women. Becoming appealed and somewhat wealthy, the family acquired property and gained a reputation and a name in Kotor.

Andrija Zmajević was born in Perast, in the Bay of Kotor, at the time part of the Republic of Venice, in late July 1628. His grandmother Anđuša had moved from Kotor to Perast in the early 17th century, after the death of her husband. After finishing the Franciscan primary school in his native town, Andrija Zmajević continued his education in Kotor, before moving to the College for the Propagation of the Faith, in Rome, where he earned a doctorate of philosophy and theology. In 1656, back in Perast, he became the town's pastor and the abbot of the monastery of St. George, on the Sveti Đorđe Island. In 1664, he became the vicar of the bishopric of Budva, where he remained after being appointed as titular archbishop of Bar in 1671, as the latter city was under Ottoman rule.

== Work ==
He collected epic and lyric folk songs and transcribed the works of Dubrovnik poets, notably Ivan Gundulić. His most important theological and historical work is Ljetopis Crkovni (“Church Chronicles”), completed in 1675 and illustrated by himself and his countryman Tripo Kokolja. Written in proto-Serbo-Croatian, the book focuses on the South Slavs and records some of their secular history. Zmajević saw them as a single people and hoped that they would eventually unite under the Roman faith, including the Eastern Orthodox Serbs. In particular, the writer greatly admired Saint Sava, whom he incorrectly considered as faithful to the Holy See.

With the exception of the poem Od pakla, published in Venice in 1727, all his works remained in manuscript during his lifetime, some of which have been lost. Among the most notable are:

1. Ljetopis crkovni (“Church chronicles”)
2. Svadja Lazarevih kćeri, Brankovice i Miloševice (“The Quarrel of Lazar's daughters, wife of Branko and wife of Miloš”)
3. Boj Peraški (“The Battle of Perast”); lost
4. Slovinskoj Dubravi (“Of Slavic Dubrovnik”)
5. Tripu Škuri (“Of Tripo Škura”)
6. Od pakla (“From Hell”); lost

Zmajević wrote both in Latin and in the vernacular language, which he called "Slavic" (slovinski) and which he wrote using both Latin and Cyrillic scripts. He justified his decision to write in Cyrillic script since it was used by the "Illyrian" and overall Slavic world.

== Legacy ==
The Croatian Encyclopedia describes him as a 'Croatian archbishop and writer' and notes that his few remaining works are archived by HAZU.

== Sources ==
- Prednjegoševsko doba, Titograd 1963.
- Babić, Vanda (2016). "Zmajevići - prilog kulturnoj povijesti Mediterana". Istorijski Zapisi (in Croatian). LXXXIX (3–4): 287–303.
- Djukanović, Bojka (2023). Historical Dictionary of Montenegro. London: Rowman & Littlefield. ISBN 9781538139141.
- Živković, Zoran D. (2016). Mediteranski svet u srpskoj književnosti [Mediterranean World in Serbian Literature] (PDF) (PhD) (in Serbian). University in Belgrade.
- Zmajević, Andrija (1996a). Pižurica, Mato (ed.). Ljetopis crkovni [Church chronicles]. Književnost Crne Gore od XII do XIX vijeka (in Serbian). Vol. I. Cetinje: Obod. OCLC 39054095.
- Zmajević, Andrija (1996b). Pižurica, Mato (ed.). Ljetopis crkovni [Church chronicles]. Književnost Crne Gore od XII do XIX vijeka (in Serbian). Vol. II. Cetinje: Obod. OCLC 39054095.
