= Sveti Đorđe Island =

Islet off the coast of Perast, Montenegro

Coordinates: 42.486°N 18.691°E

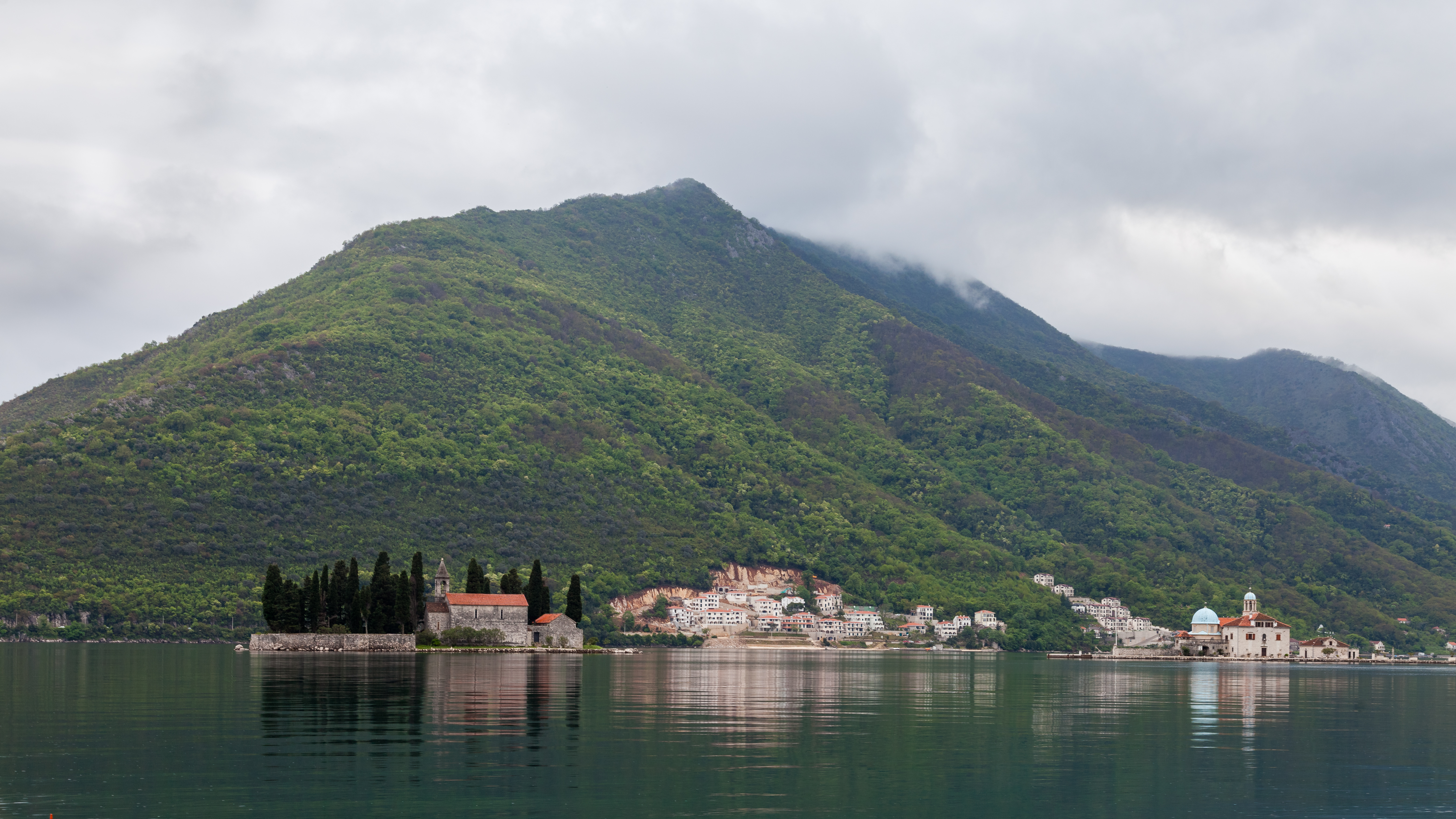
Sveti Đorđe in Bay of Kotor (on the left)

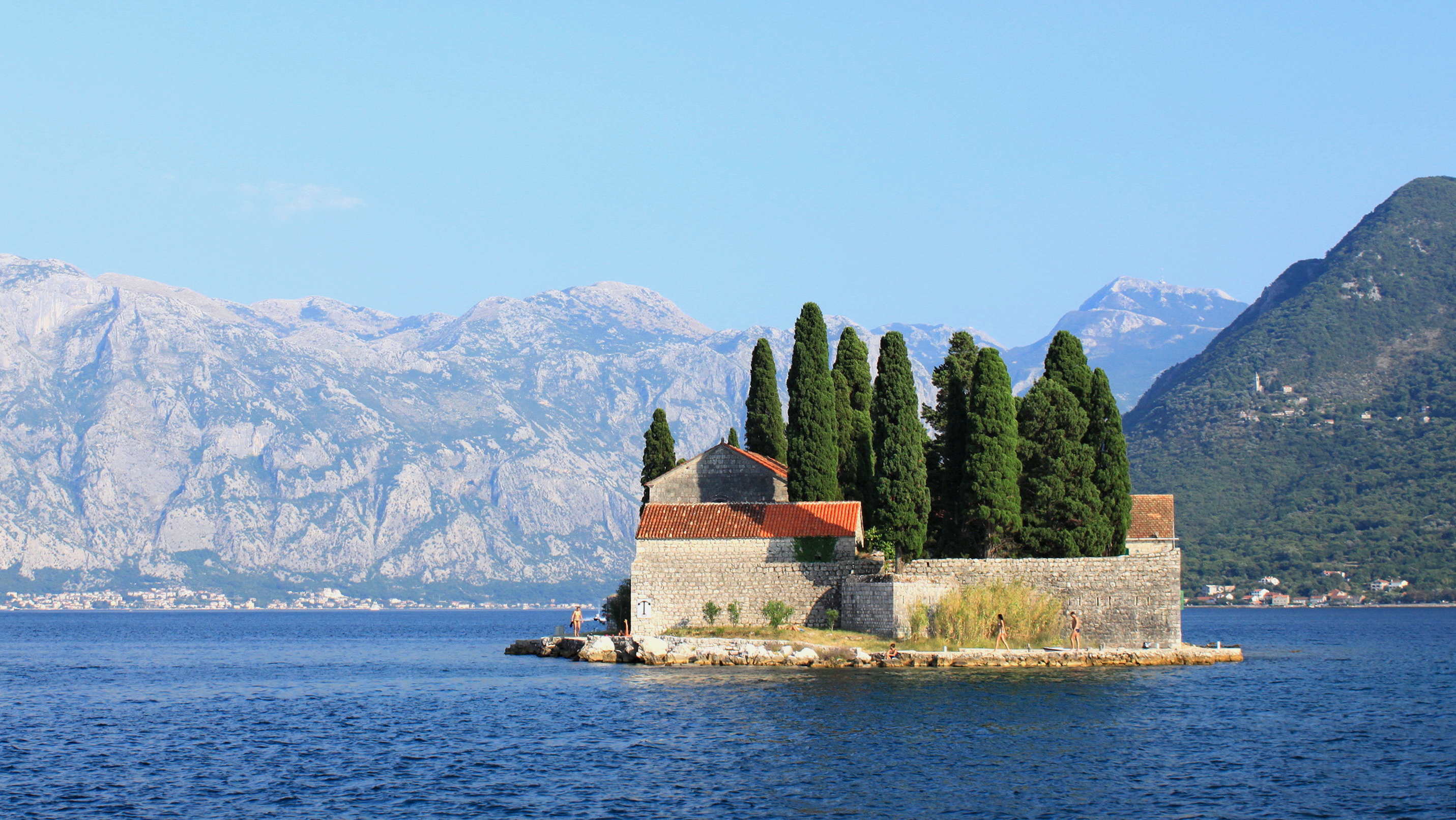
St. George Island (Sveti Đorđe)

Sveti Đorđe Island (Montenegrin: Острво Свети Ђорђе, romanized: Ostrvo Sveti Đorđe, lit. 'Island of Saint George') is one of the two islets off the coast of Perast in the Bay of Kotor, Montenegro (the other being Gospa od Škrpjela). Unlike Gospa od Škrpjela, it is a natural island. A small action took place during the Siege of Cattaro on 14 October 1813 when the French-held island was captured by a British and Sicilian naval force. The island features the Saint George Benedictine monastery, constructed in the 12th century, and the old graveyard for the old nobility from Perast and further from the whole Bay of Kotor. It may have been an inspiration for the painting Isle of the Dead.

== See also ==
- Natural and Culturo-Historical Region of Kotor
