= Our Lady of the Rocks =

Islet off the coast of Perast, Montenegro

Coordinates: 42°29′12″N 18°41′20″E

Native name: Gospa od Škrpjela
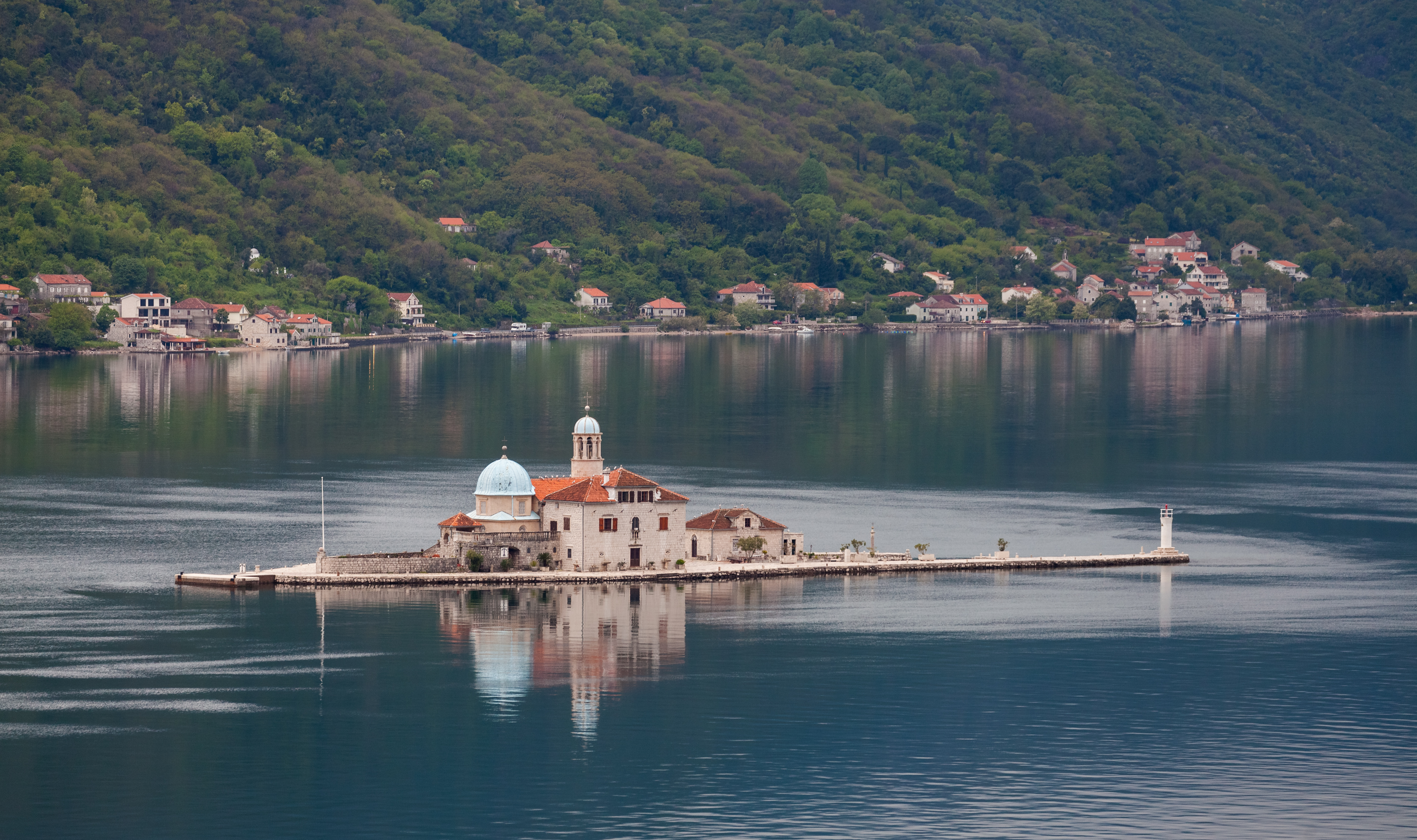
- Interactive map of Our Lady of the Rocks

Geography
- Location: Bay of Kotor
- Area: 0.38 ha (0.94 acres)

Administration
- Montenegro

Our Lady of the Rocks (Montenegrin: Госпа од Шкрпјела, Gospa od Škrpjela) is one of the two islets off the coast of Perast in the Bay of Kotor, Montenegro (the other being Sveti Đorđe Island). It is an artificial island created by bulwark of rocks and by sinking old and seized ships loaded with rocks. The Catholic Church of Our Lady of the Rocks is the largest building on the islet, and has a museum attached to it. There is also a small gift shop close to the church and a navigation light at the northern end of the islet.

According to legend, the islet was made over the centuries by local seamen who kept an ancient oath after finding the icon of Madonna and Child on the rock in the sea on 22 July 1452. Upon returning from each successful voyage, they laid a rock in the Bay. Over time, the islet gradually emerged from the sea. The custom of throwing rocks into the sea is alive even nowadays. Every year on the sunset of 22 July, an event called fašinada in the local dialect, when local residents take their boats and throw rocks into the sea, widening the surface of the island, takes place. The church was renovated in 1722.

== The museum ==
The museum segment of the church contains 68 paintings by Tripo Kokolja, a famous 17th-century baroque artist from Perast. His most important painting, ten meters long, is The Death of the Virgin. There are also paintings by Italian artists, and an icon (circa 1452) of Our Lady of the Rocks, by Lovro Dobričević of Kotor.

The museum houses large collections of votive paintings and of silver votive tablets and a famous votive tapestry embroidered by Jacinta Kunić-Mijović from Perast. It took her 25 years to finish it while waiting for her darling to return from a long journey, and eventually, she became blind. She used golden and silver fibres but what makes this tapestry so famous is the fact that she also embroidered her own hair in it.

== Gallery ==
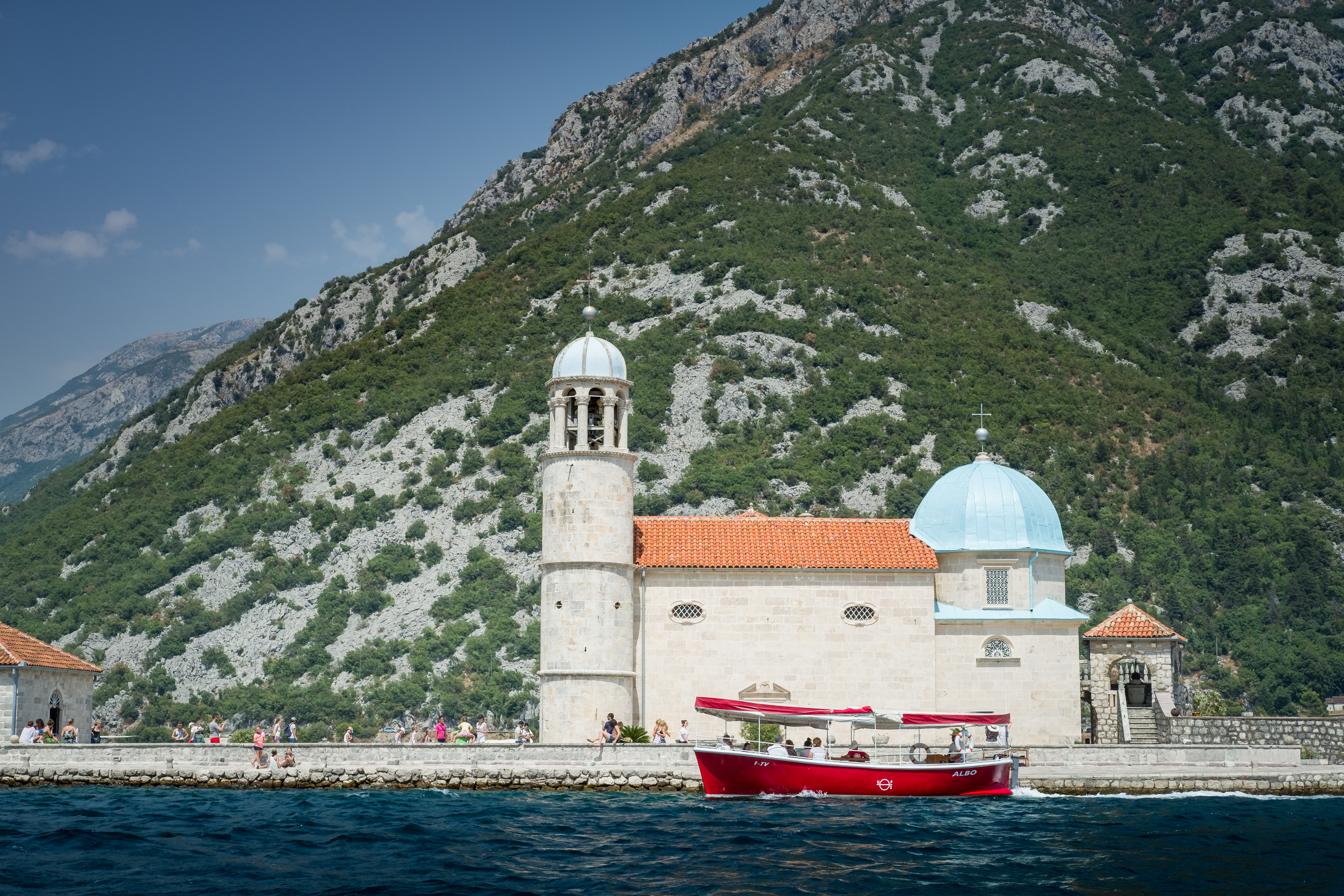

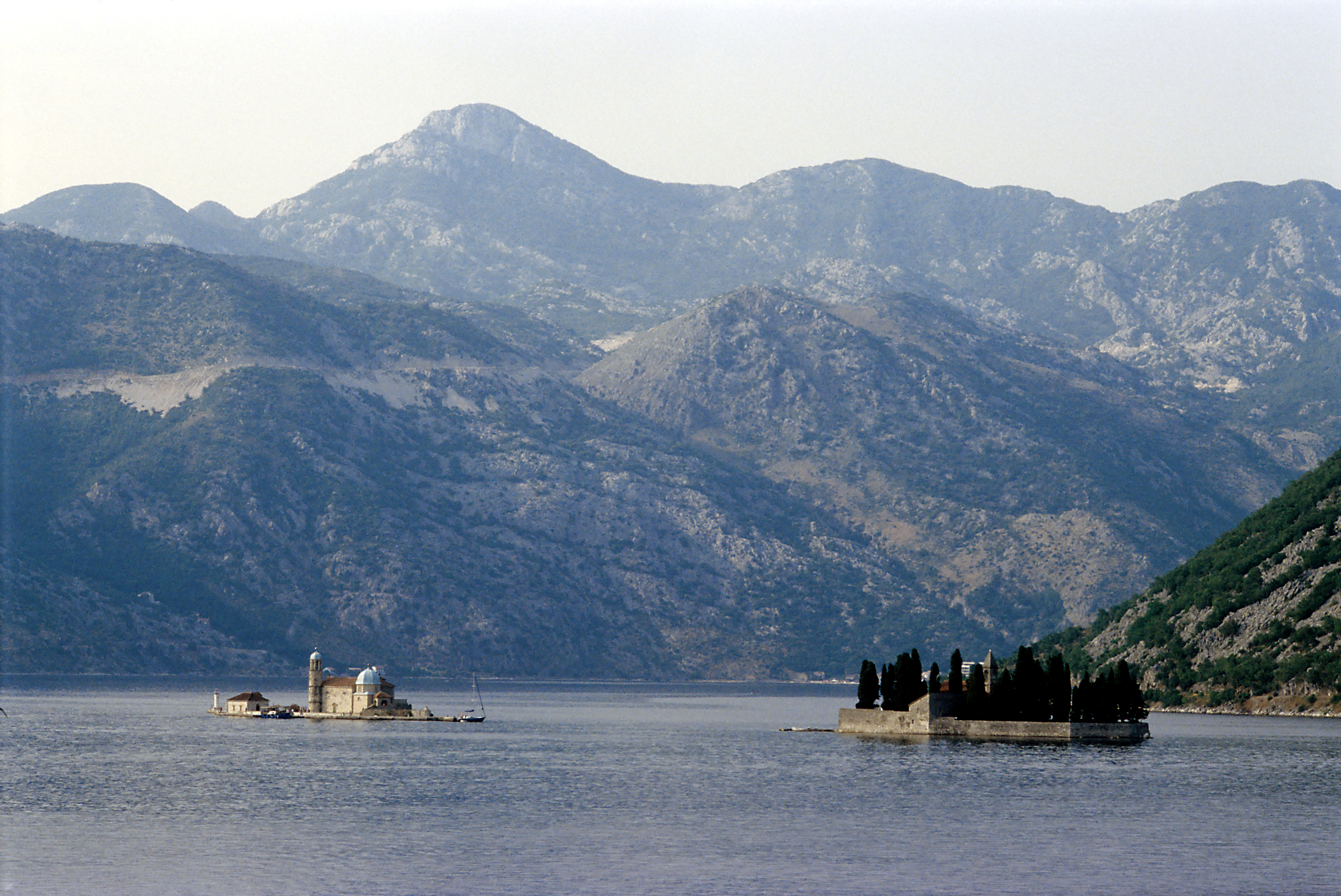

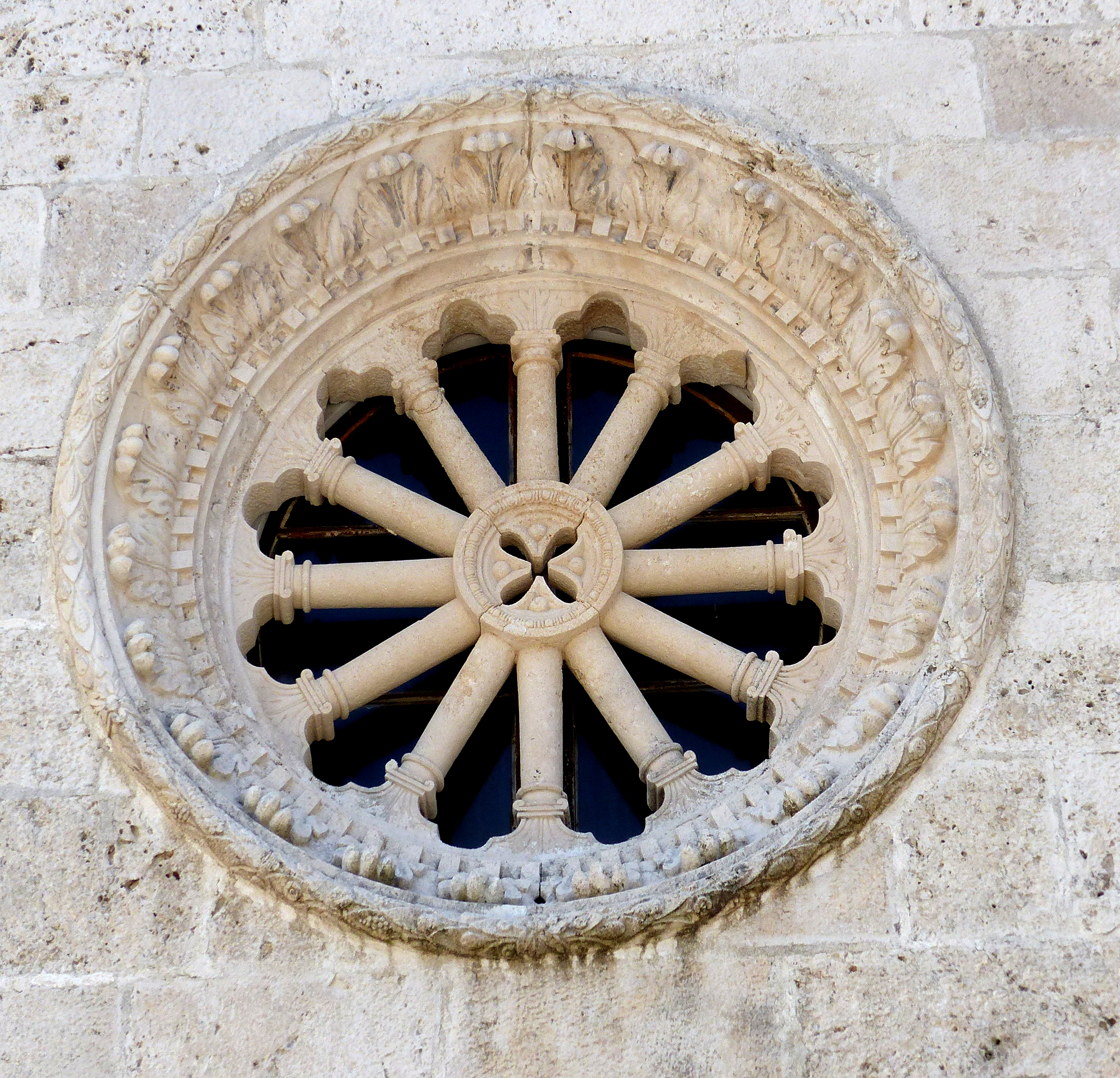

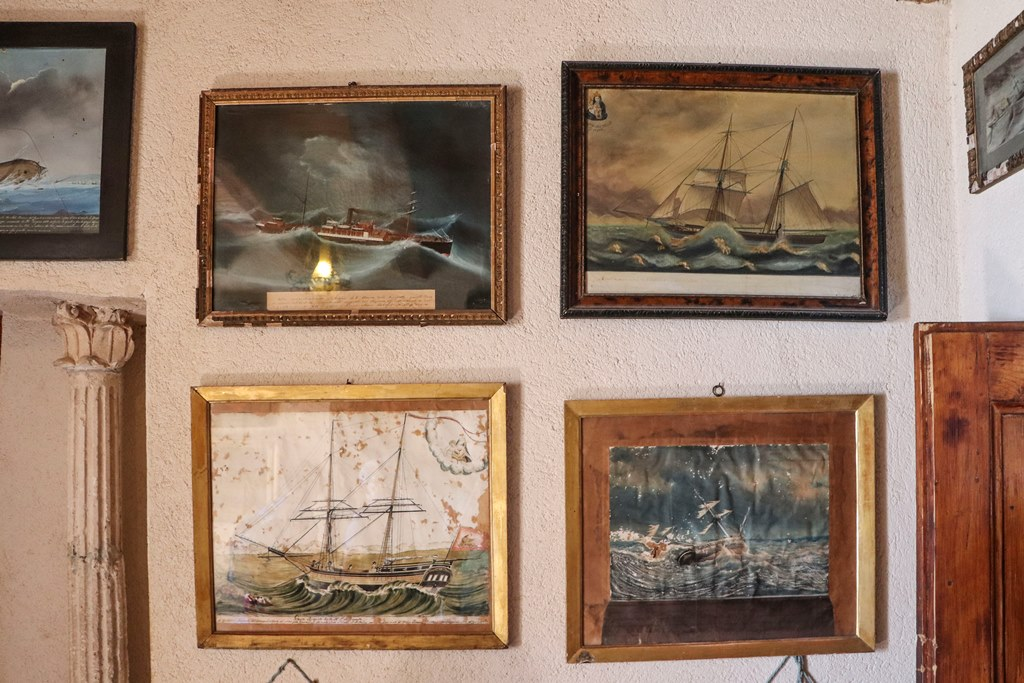
The museum: Votive paintings

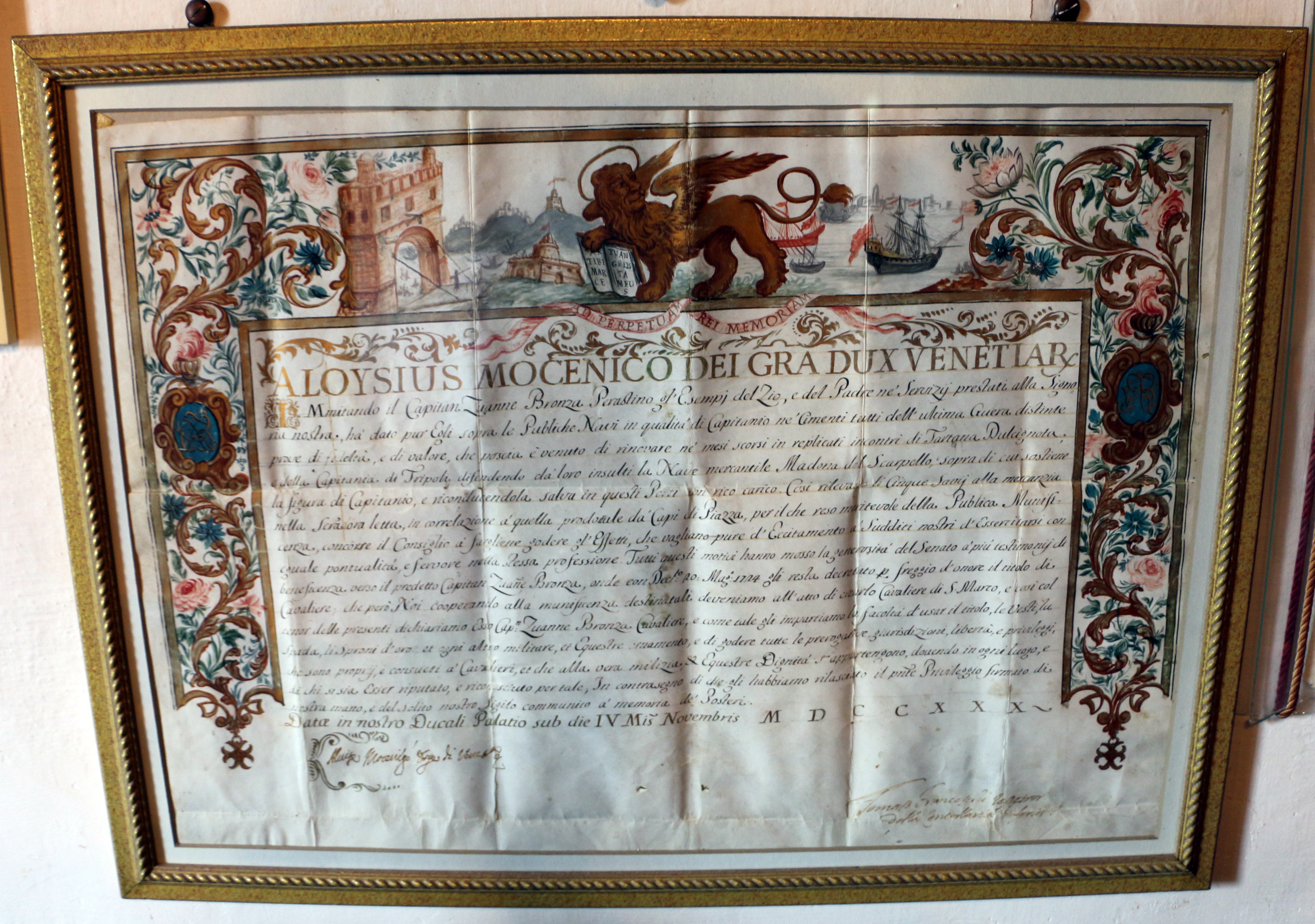
The museum: Privilege of the Doge Sebastiano Mocenigo to Perast

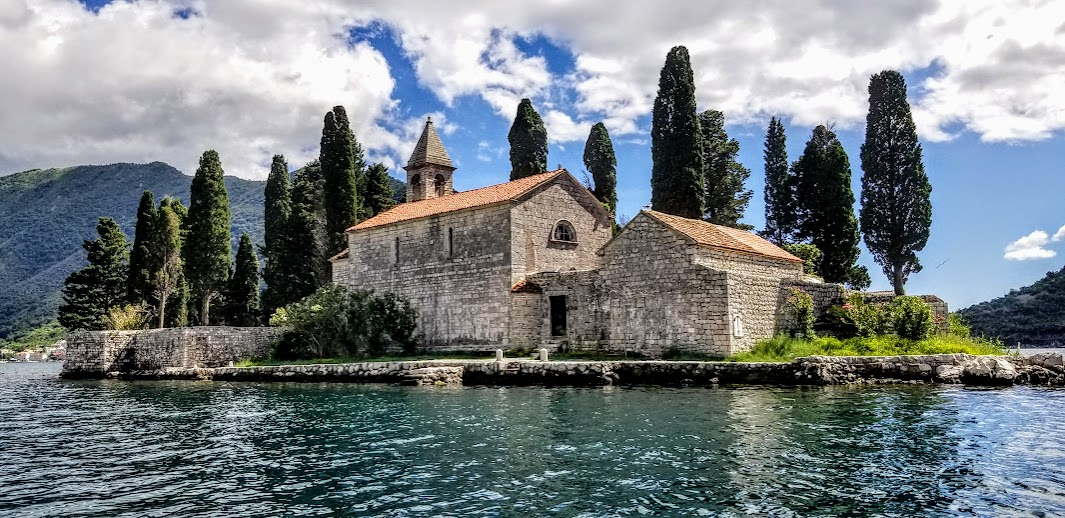
Sv. Đorđe (St. George) island, which is located next to the island of Our Lady of the Rocks

== See also ==
- Natural and Culturo-Historical Region of Kotor
- Catholic Church in Montenegro
