= Risan =

Coastal settlement in Montenegro

Risan Рисан
- Town
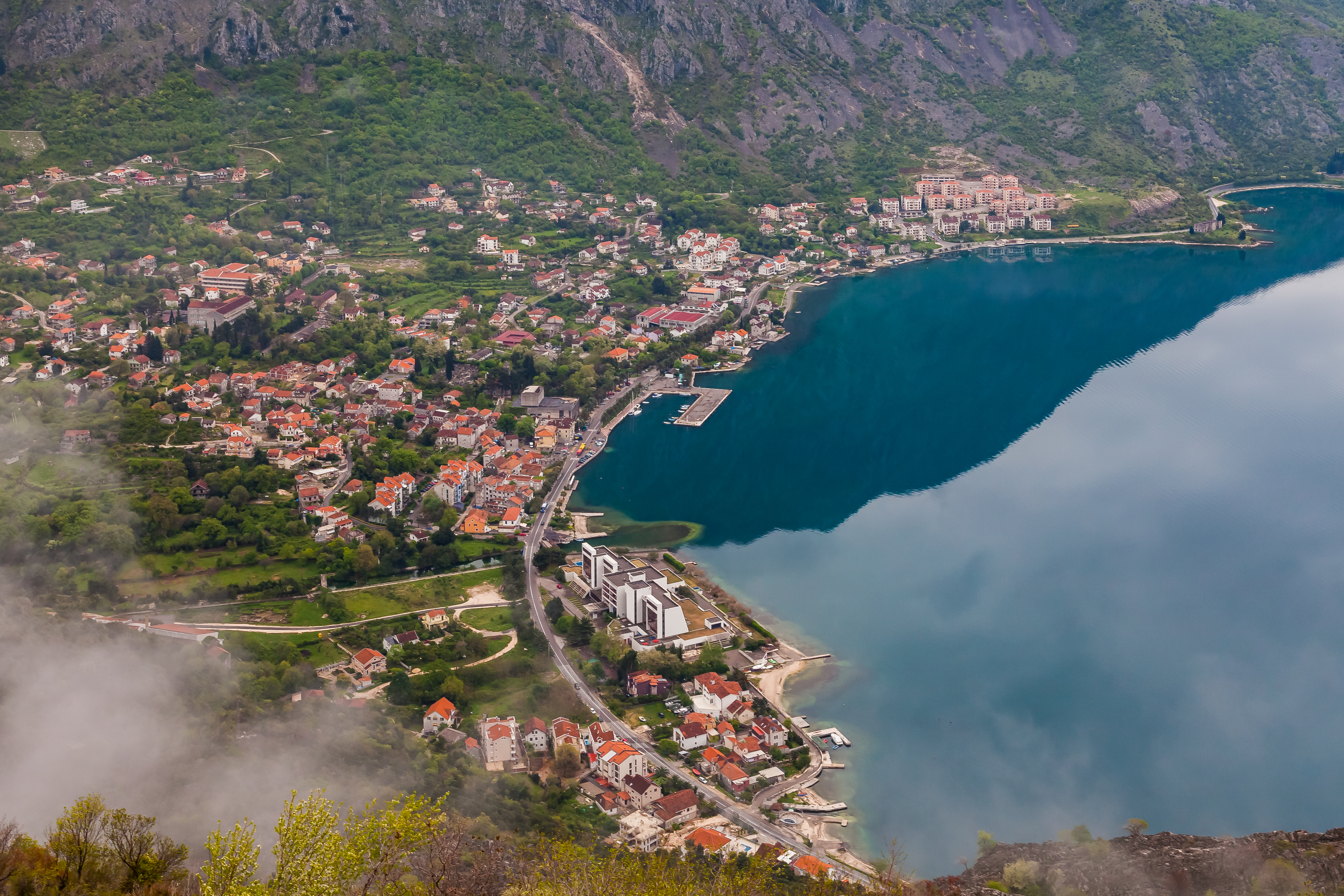

- Location within Montenegro
- Coordinates: 42°30′53″N 18°41′42″E
- Country: Montenegro
- Region: Coastal
- Municipality: Kotor

Population (2011)
  - Total: 2,034
- Time zone: UTC+1 (CET)
  - Summer (DST): UTC+2 (CEST)
- Postal code: 85337
- Area code: 032
- Vehicle registration: KO

UNESCO World Heritage Site
- Part of: Natural and Culturo-Historical Region of Kotor
- Criteria: Cultural: (i)(ii)(iii)(iv)
- Reference: 125ter
- Inscription: 1979 (3rd Session)
- Extensions: 2012, 2015

Risan (Montenegrin: Рисан, pronounced [rîsan]) is a town in the Bay of Kotor, Montenegro. It traces its origins to the ancient settlement of Rhizon, the oldest settlement in the Bay of Kotor.

Lying in the innermost portion of the bay, the settlement was protected from the interior by inaccessible limestone cliffs of the Orjen mountain which are the highest range of eastern Adriatic, and through several following narrow straits in the Bay of Kotor from the open sea.

While the Krivošije karst plateau that hangs steep above the narrow shores of Risan bay receives over 5000 mm rain annually (European record), several strong karst springs that form a short brook collect in the narrow cultivable belt at Risan.

== Etymology ==
The town was called Risinium in Latin. It is possibly related to Albanian "rrjedh", meaning "flow, stream".

== History ==
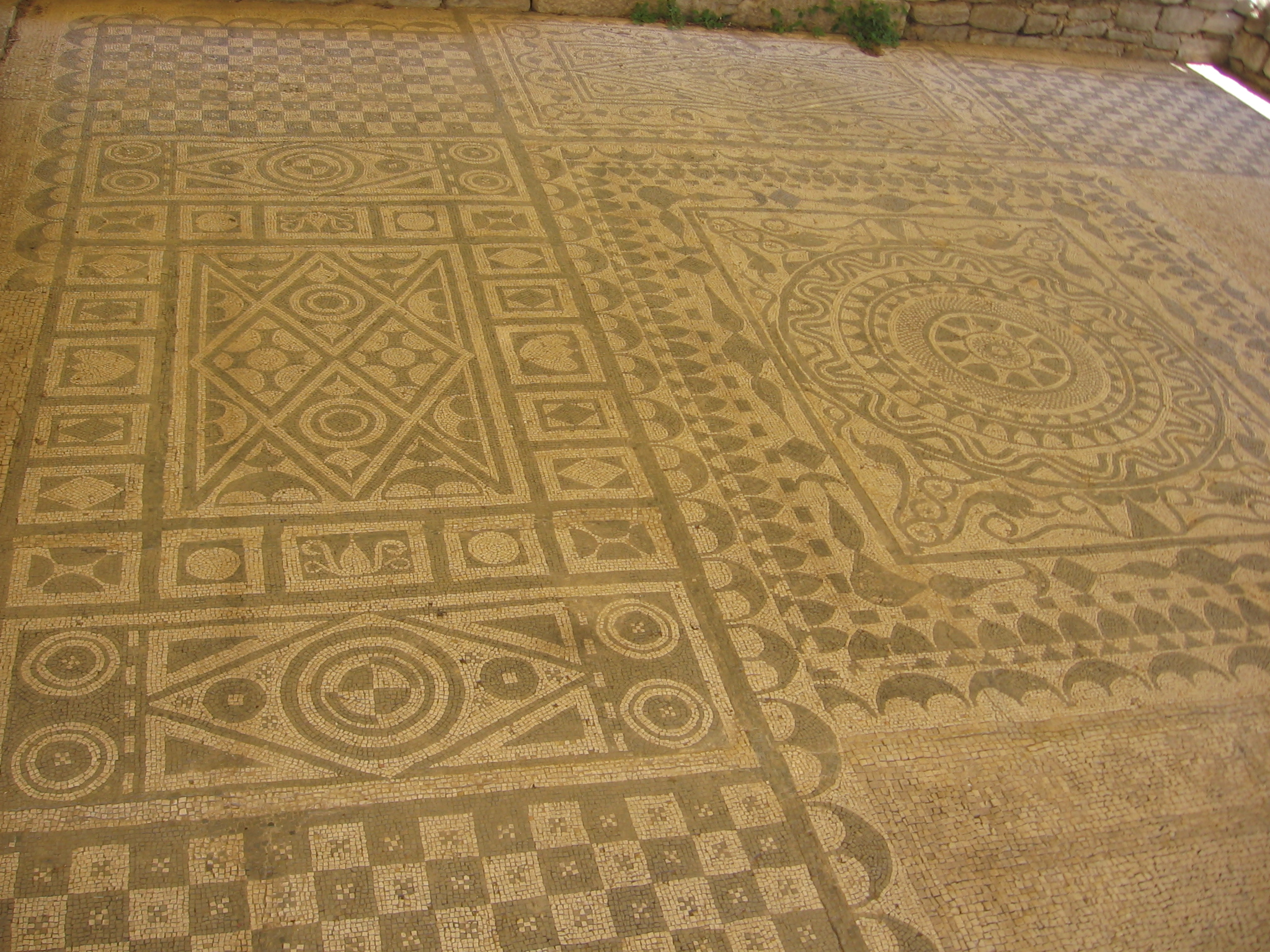
Roman mosaics in Risan

The earliest mention of Rhizon dates back to the 4th century BC, as the main fortress in the Illyrian state where Queen Teuta took refuge during the Illyrian Wars. The degree of Hellenization at Rhizon was very high. In Roman times, Rhizinium is documented as an oppidum civium Romanorum, and the most prosperous time for Roman Rhizinium came during the 1st and 2nd centuries, when huge villas were made in the area and the city had 10,000 inhabitants. Five mosaics are the most valuable remains of that period - not only for Risan but also for Montenegro.

Circa 500 it became the see of the Roman Catholic Diocese of Risano. The invasions of the Avars and Slavs left the city deserted. The last reference of a Roman bishop in Risan dates back to 595.

In the 10th century, the Byzantine emperor Constantine Porphyrogenitus includes Risan among the inhabited towns of Travunia, while the priest of Doclea considers Rissena to be a district.

During the Middle Ages, Risan lost the significance it used to have in the ancient times. No later than the 13th century, the Italians provided the bulk of a henceforward unbroken series of Latin Catholic Bishops of Risano until its suppression circa 1630.

In the mid-15th century, Risan was referred to as a town of Herceg Stjepan. In 1466, the Venetians offered to give Brač island and a palace in Split to Herceg Stjepan, in exchange for his two towns (Risan and Novi) in the Boka Kotorska. In 1482, the Ottomans took Risan, together with Herceg Novi, from Herceg Stjepan's son Vlatko, using it as a base for its corsairs to pirate Venetian shipping sailing from their nearby holdings of Cattaro and Perasto.

Only in 1688 did Risan become Venetian as part of the Albania Veneta with the Venetian name of Risano, enjoying a temporary economic growth. In the following centuries Risan has had the same fate as the whole of Dalmatia. It was for a few years during World War II part of the Kingdom of Italy in the Italian Governatorate of Dalmatia and today it is part of independent Montenegro.

According to the 1627 population census, Risan had 800 citizens. 570 were Muslim, 150 Orthodox and 80 Catholic.

== Modern Risan ==
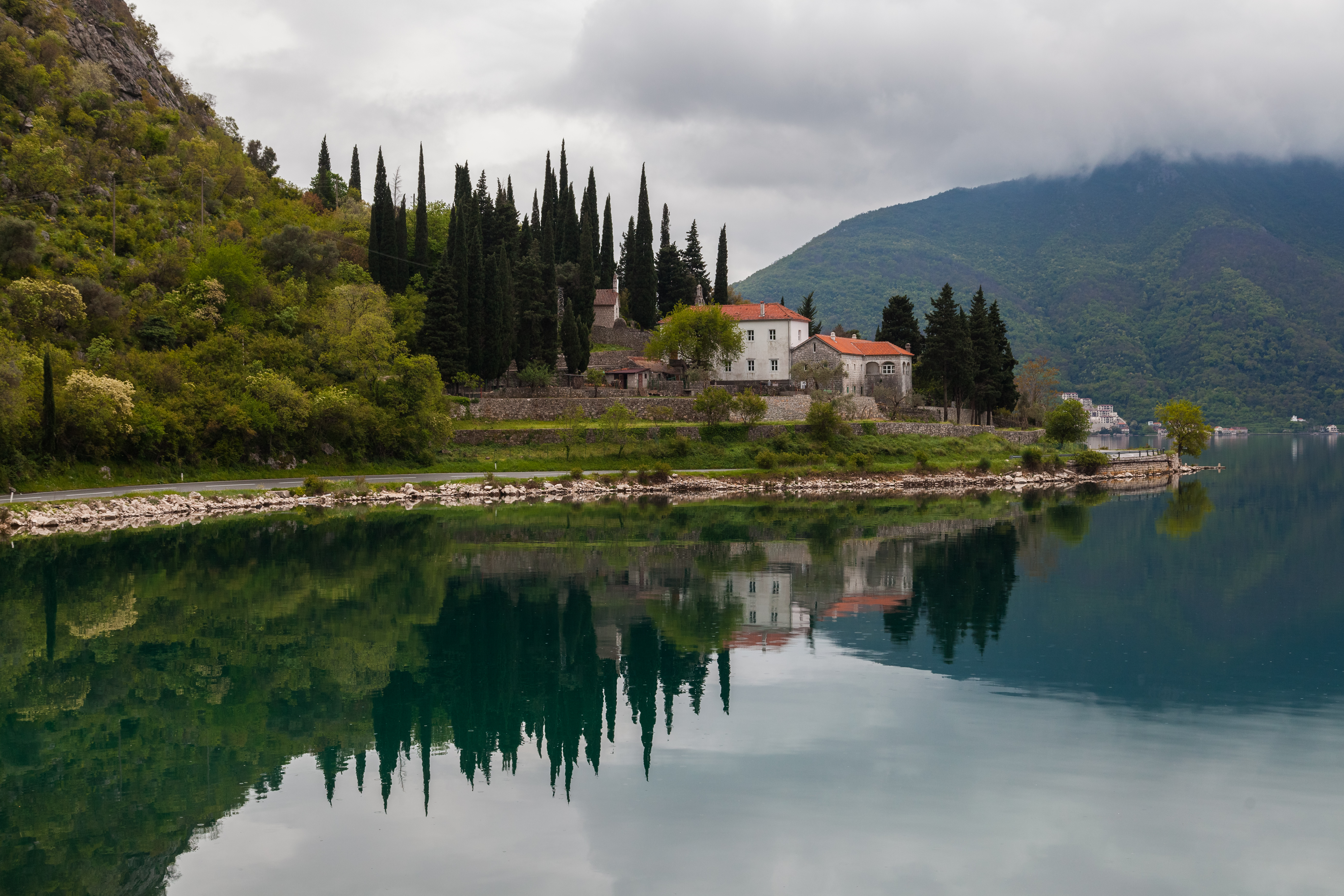
Risan

In the present-day Risan, there are no elements that could connect it to the medieval town. Risan by the sea was probably just a settlement. However, on the Gradina hill, above the famous archeological site of Carine, a fortification is situated containing remains of an Illyrian acropolis, as well as the medieval and Turkish stratum. The position of the fortification was excellent, particularly for the control of Risan – Onogošt route, while the hilltop itself was inaccessible.

Today Risan is a small port with roughly 2000 inhabitants (in 1900: around 5000 inhabitants; of them 80% Orthodox Christians, 20% Catholics) where logs from the vast virgin forests of the Bijela gora are shipped mostly to Italy. Risan is a tourist destination that has a hotel called after its most famous citizen, Queen Teuta, with accompanying fine beaches.

Risan is in the northern section of the Municipality of Kotor.

== Demographics ==
Ethnicity in 2011
Ethnicity	Number	Percentage
Montenegrins	1,032	50.7%
Serbs	589	28.9%
Croats	31	1.5%
Russians	15	0.7%
Egyptians	14	0.7%
other and undeclared	353	17.3%
Total	2,034	100%

== See also ==
- Rhizon
- Natural and Culturo-Historical Region of Kotor
- Albania Veneta

== External links and sources ==
- Photos from Risan: fotokate.pl
- Photos from Risan: Postcards from the Transition
- MZ Risan
- Venetian Risan and the Bay of Cattaro (in Italian)
- GCatholic - ecclesiastical history
