= Perast =

Town in Kotor Municipality, Montenegro

Perast Perast
- Town
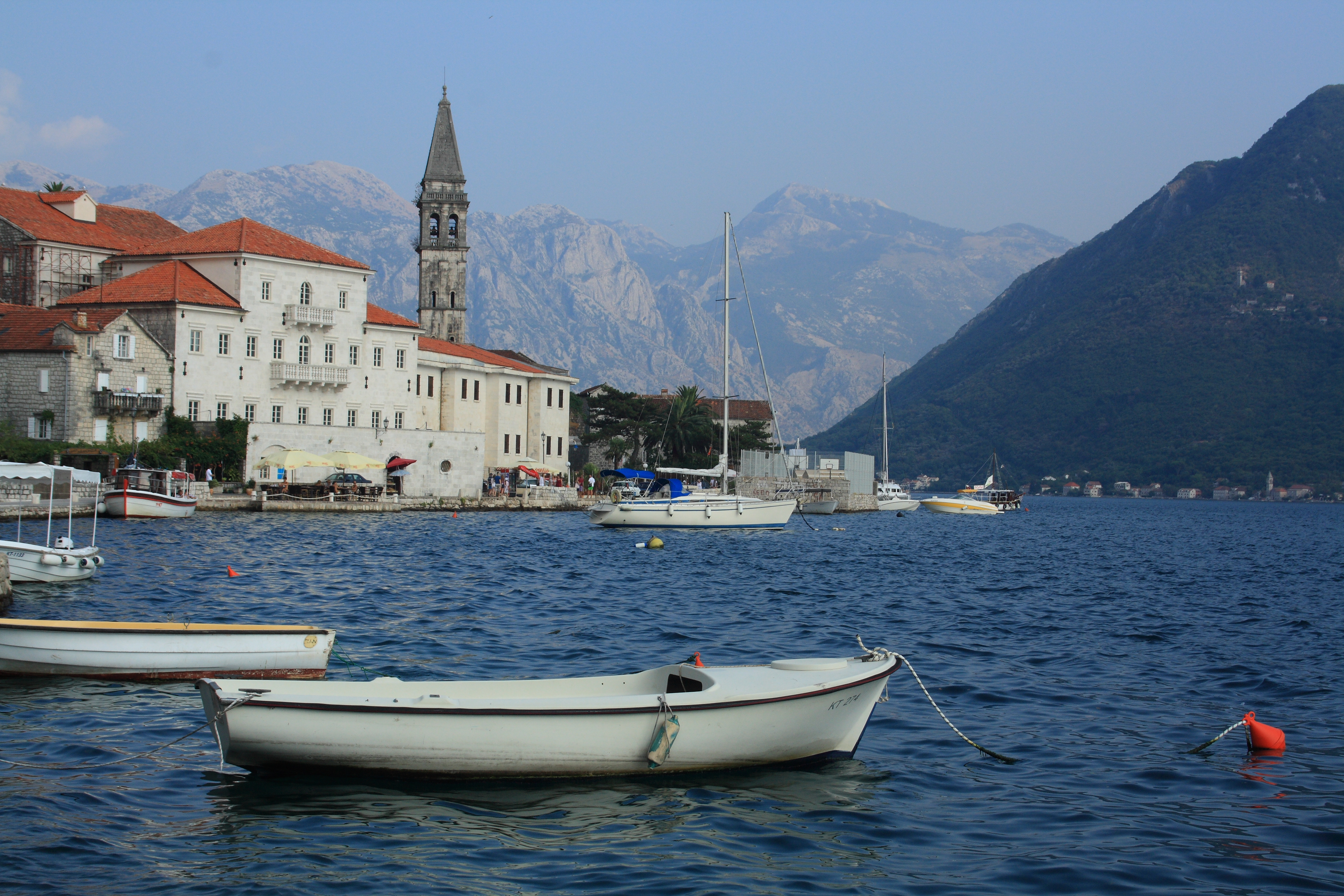
- View of Perast

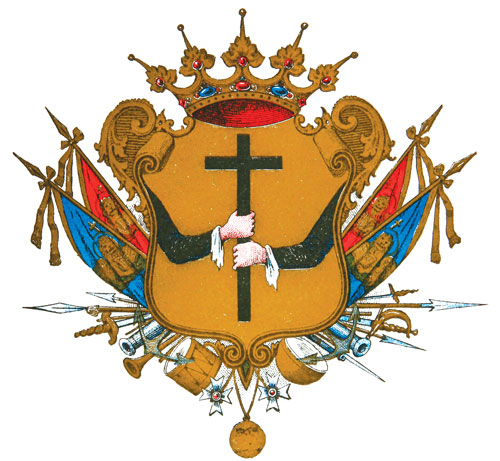
- Seal

- Location within Montenegro
- Coordinates: 42°29′13″N 18°41′57″E
- Country: Montenegro
- Region: Coastal
- Municipality: Kotor

Population (2023)
  - Total: 237
- Time zone: UTC+1 (CET)
  - Summer (DST): UTC+2 (CEST)
- Postal code: 85336
- Area code: 082
- Vehicle registration: KO

Perast (Montenegrin: Perast) is a town in the coastal region of Montenegro. It is situated a few kilometres northwest of Kotor and is noted for its proximity to the islets of St. George and Our Lady of the Rocks.

== History ==
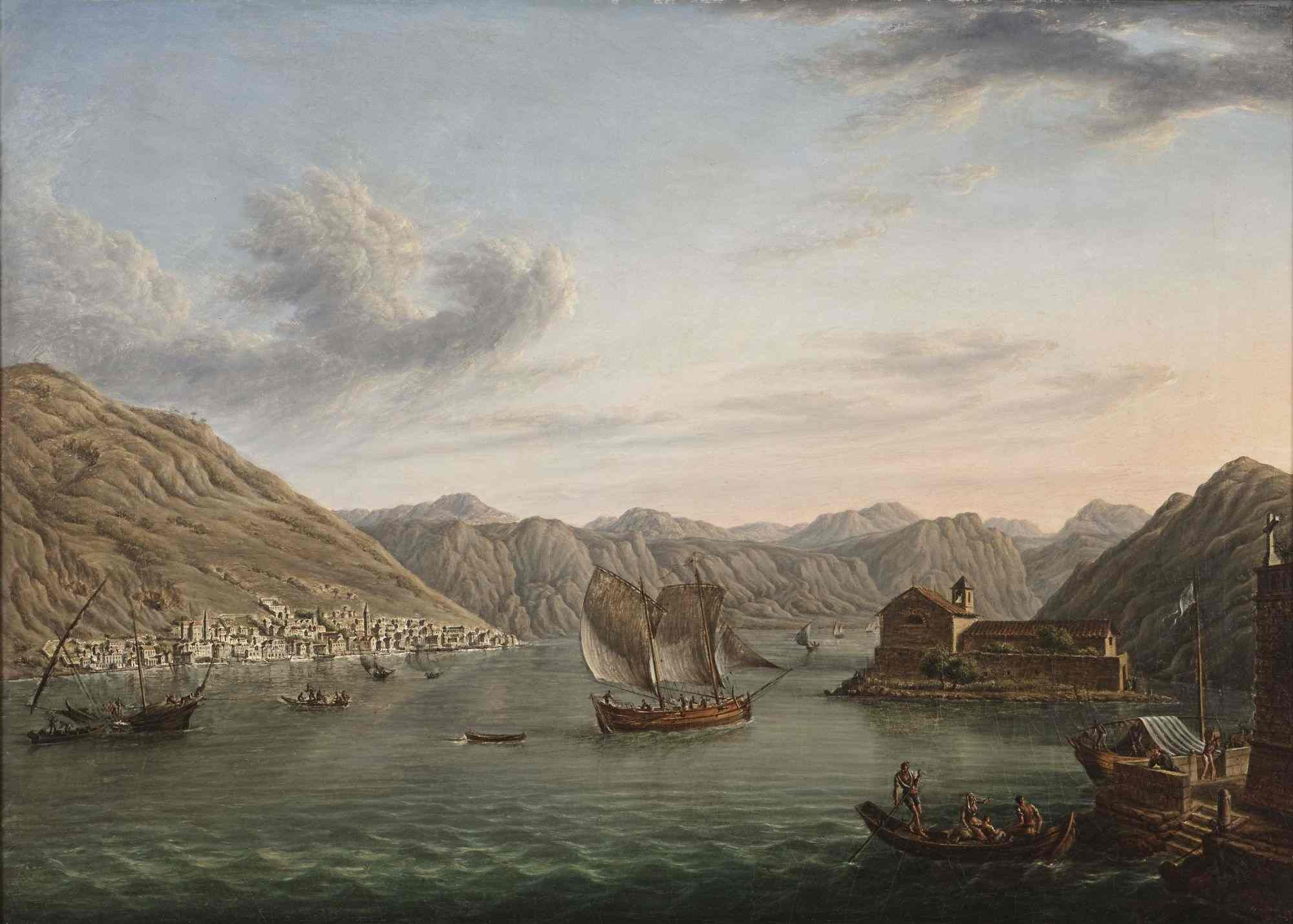
Painting of Perast by Jean-Baptiste-François Génillion, 1810

According to the presumptions of the archaeologists, the first settlements appeared in the area of Perast in the Neolithic; there are also monuments of the Illyrian, Roman, and early Christian periods. The city was founded by the Illyrians, named after one of the local tribes, Pirusti.

The first memories of Perast refer to 1336—at that time there was a small fishing village, which had a shipyard, and there were always several commercial and fishing boats in the harbor. But since the strategically important island of St George, which belonged to Kotor, is in the immediate vicinity, the development of Perast was slow.

The prosperity of the city brought the Venetian period, and it was of particular importance in the border area around 1482, after taking the Turkish part of the coast from Herceg Novi to Risan. When a small village finally became a city, its inhabitants thought about reinforcements. The fortress of the Holy Cross and a dozen defensive towers were built. After the successfully held battles, Perast began to use some of the political and economic privileges, in particular, it had the right to guard the Venetian flag of St. Mark after 1654 by holding a siege by the Turks under the leadership of Mehmed-beg Rizvanagić.

Pyotr Andreyevich Tolstoy traveled from Herceg Novi to Perast in 1698 and he wrote that in the town of Perast existed a Croatian community. He also claimed that there were no Orthodox churches in the city while an Orthodox church existed in a village not far away, and that Serbians of Greek faith who were military people similar to the Don Cossacks lived in the village.

Perast also had free trade with the Republic of Venice and was granted the forgiveness of the Venetian authorities in the ruthless fight against pirates on the Adriatic. Because of this, the city grew and was enriched: only in the 18th century. For centuries, 20 palaces were built in Baroque style, 17 Catholic and two Orthodox churches. Since one of the best maritime schools was housed here, Peter I was sent here from Russia by promising sailors for training with extraordinary captain Marko Martinovic. When Napoleon defeated the Republic of Venice in 1797, Perast was faithful to Venice for several months, but in the end the city had to lower the flag of St. Mark. From that moment began the decline of Perast: along with the whole area of the Bay of Kotor, it was left to the Austrians and Italians, and then the French, and then again under the rule of the Austro-Hungarian Empire until the empire was defeated in the First World War. In 1918, the city became part of the Kingdom of Serbs, Croats and Slovenians, and in 1941 it became part of the Italian province of Cattaro (Kotor). It was only in 1944 that the city gained independence in Yugoslavia and became one of the administrative areas of the Montenegrin Republic. Since 2006, the city has become part of an independent Montenegro.

== Geography ==
Perast lies beneath the hill of St Ilija (873 m), on a cape that separates the Bay of Risano from that of Kotor, and overlooks the Verige strait, the narrowest part of the Bay of Kotor. The average yearly temperature in Perast is 18.3°C, and the number of sunny days is 240 (or around 2,500 sunny hours per year).

Near Perast there are two islets: one is called Sveti Đorđe (St George) or Sveti Juraj and the other Gospa od Škrpjela (Our Lady of the Rocks), and each has a picturesque chapel. Gospa od Škrpjela is particularly interesting given that it is the only artificially-built island in the Adriatic, with an area of 3,030 m^{2}, it was built upon a rock (Škrpjel) after two Venetian sailors from Perast found a picture of the Virgin Mary on it in 1452.

== Demographics ==
Historical population
| Year | Pop. | ±% |
|---|---|---|
| 1991 | 444 | — |
| 2003 | 349 | −21.4% |
| 2011 | 269 | −22.9% |
| 2023 | 237 | −11.9% |

Out of total population of Perast, 115 are male, while 122 are female.

According to the 2023 census, the town had a total of 237 inhabitants, divided by ethnicity:

| Ethnicity (2023 census) | number | Percentage |
|---|---|---|
| Montenegrins | 111 | 46.84% |
| Serbs | 75 | 31.65% |
| Croats | 18 | 7.59% |
| others | 27 | 11.39% |

== Notable people ==
- Matija Zmajević, admiral of the Russian Navy
- Andrija Zmajević, Baroque poet, the Archbishop of Antivari, Primate of Serbia and theologian
- Krsto Zmajević, captain and merchant
- Vicko Zmajević, Roman Catholic archbishop of the Archdiocese of Zadar, Croatia
- Vicko Bujović, military commander and captain of Perast
- Tripo Kokolja, painter
- Andrija Balović, Roman Catholic priest

== Gallery ==
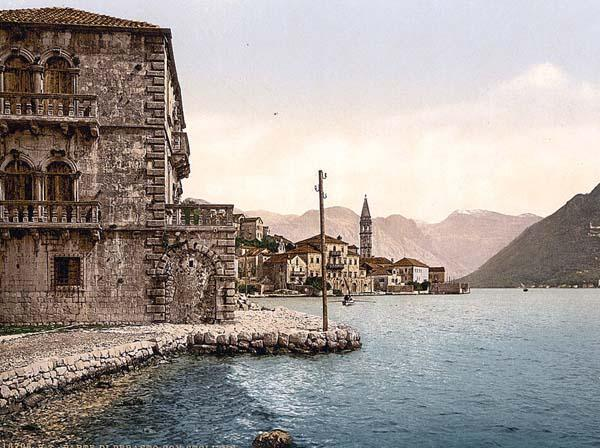
Postcard of Perast in 1900.

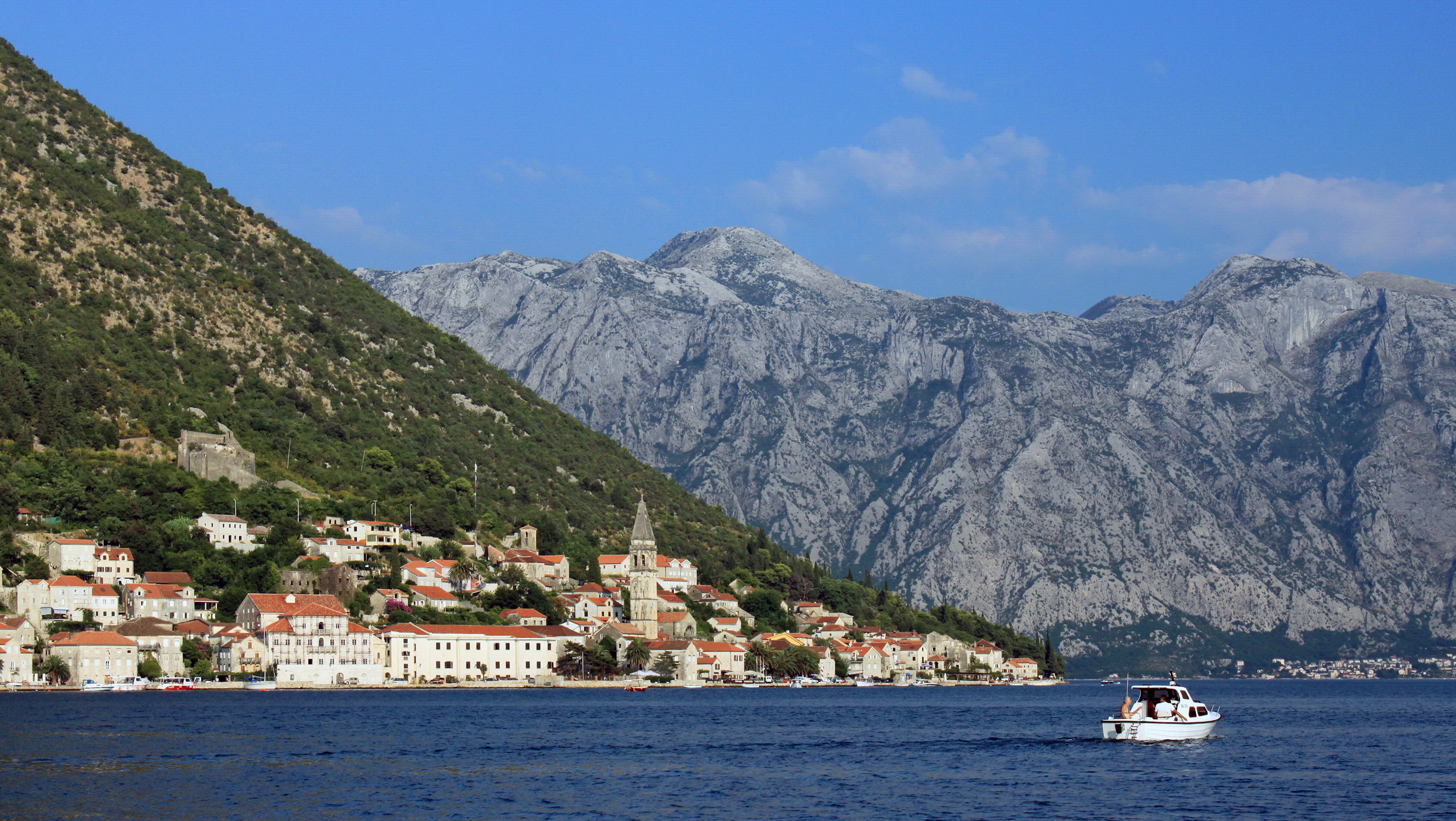
View of the town from the sea

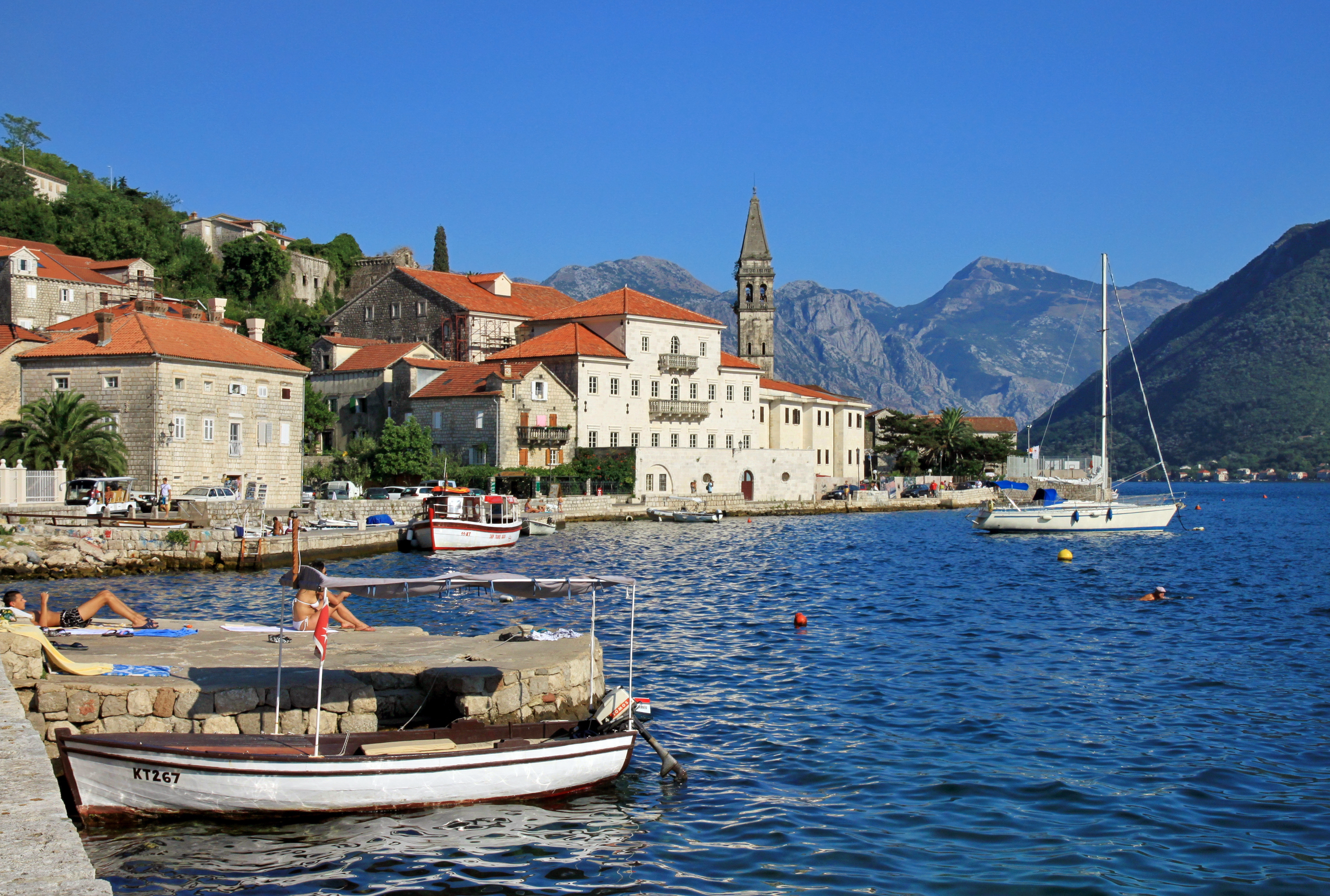
View of the town from the west.

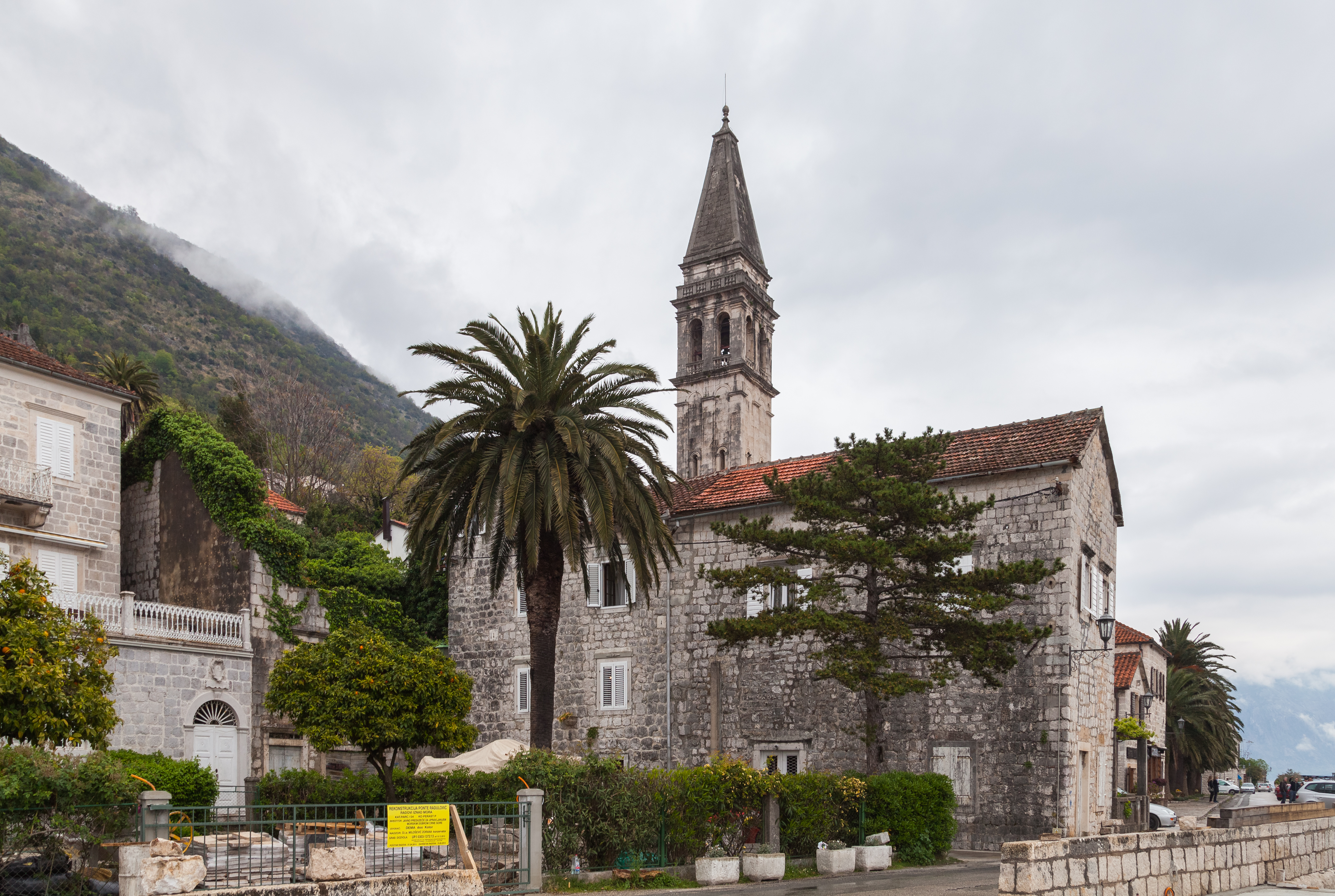
St Nicholas church in Perast.

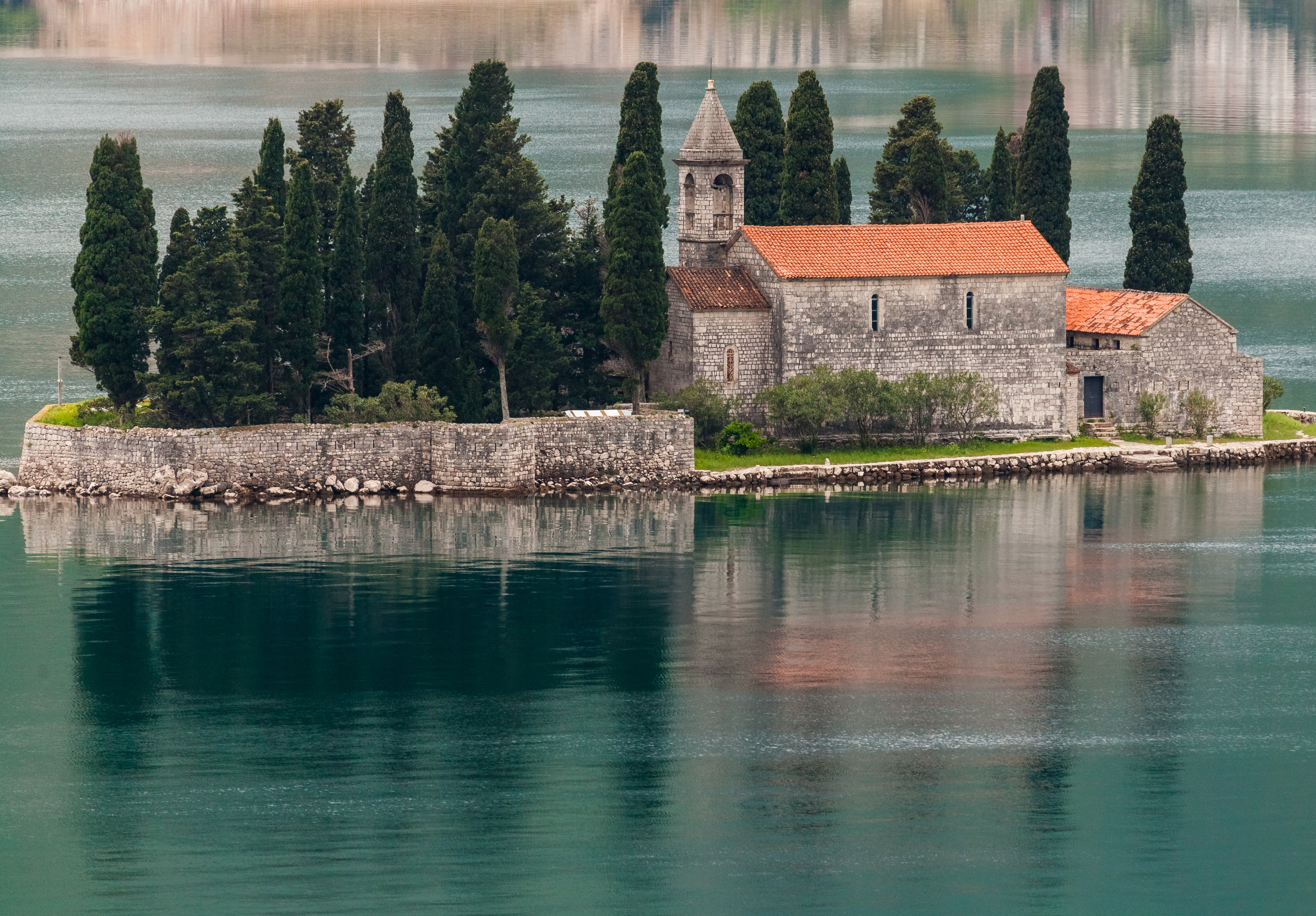
St George island.

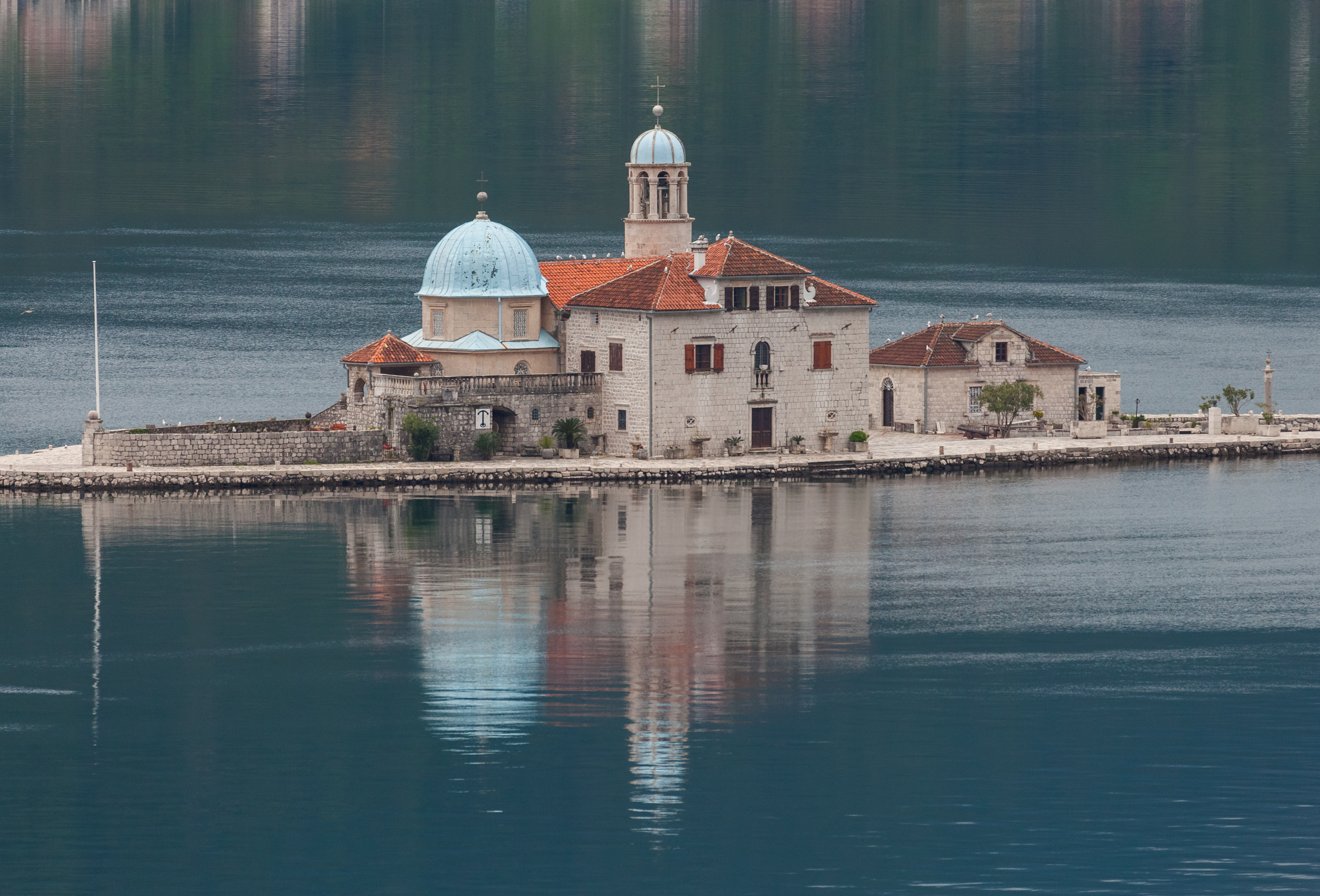
Old Perast: the artificial island Gospa od Škrpjela.

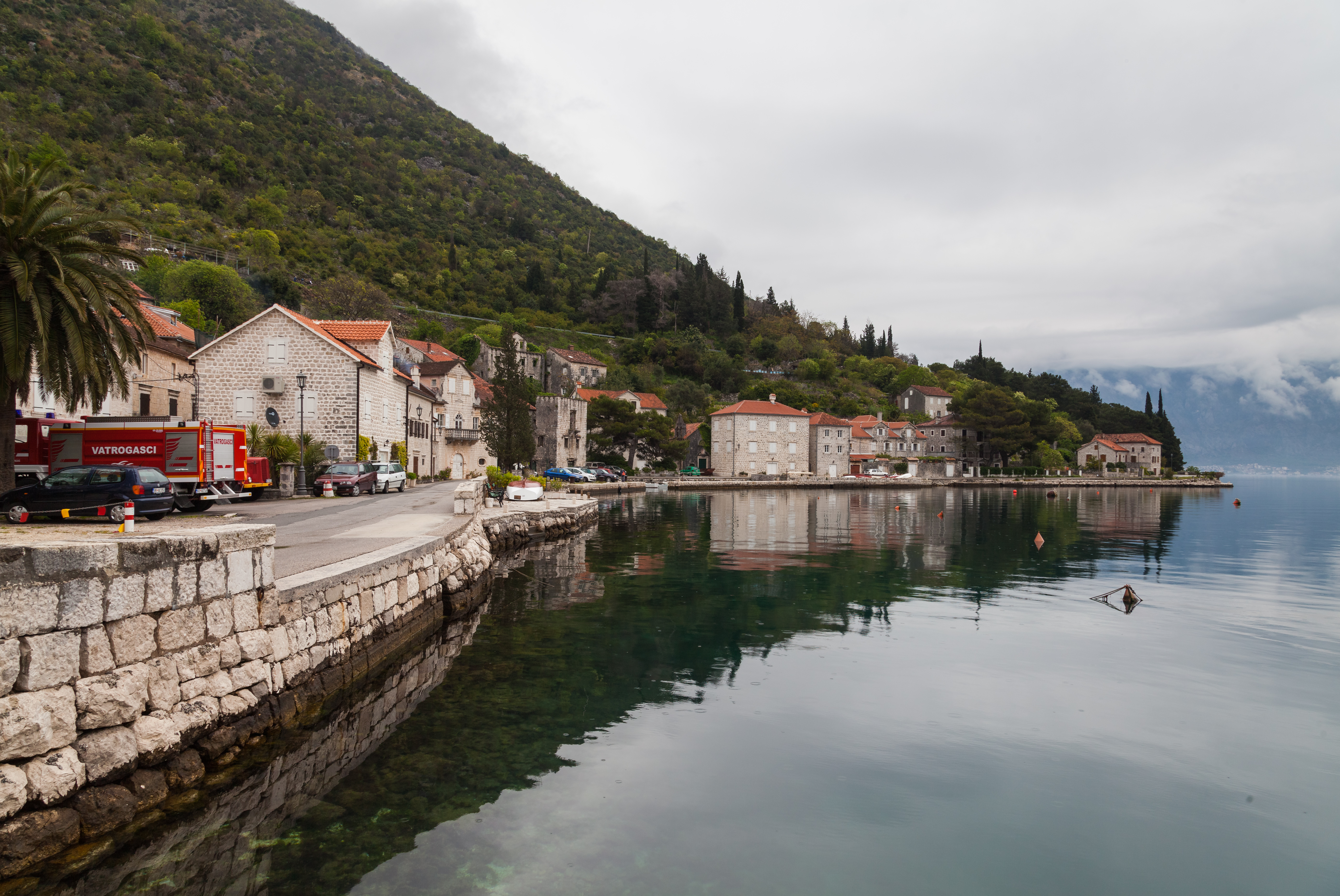
Shore of Perast.

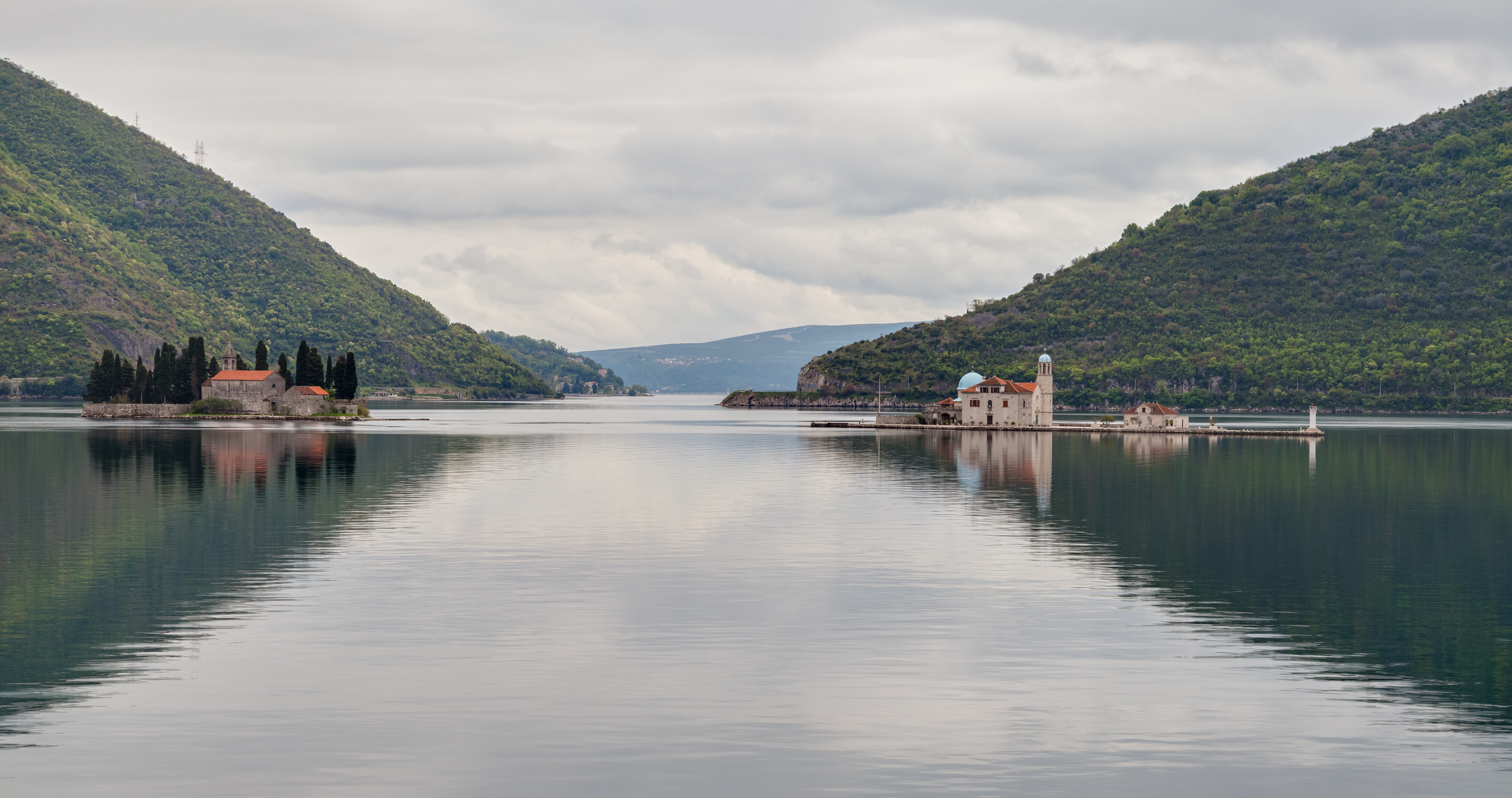
The two islands off Perast.

== See also ==
- Natural and Culturo-Historical Region of Kotor
