= Ivan Štironja =

Croatian Roman Catholic prelate; bishop of Poreč-Pula since 2023

The Most Reverend Ivan Štironja
- Bishop of Poreč-Pula
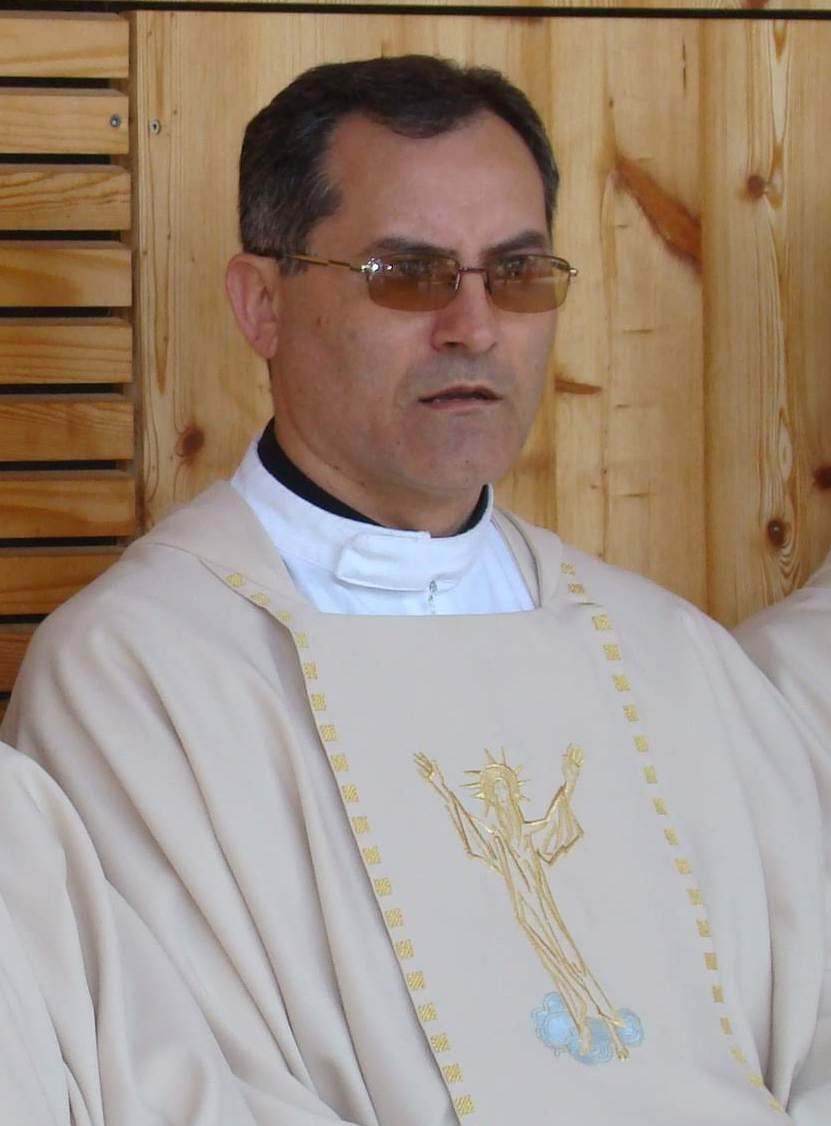
- Štironja in 2009
- Church: Catholic Church
- Diocese: Poreč-Pula
- Appointed: 31 January 2023
- Installed: 18 March 2023
- Predecessor: Dražen Kutleša
- Other post: Parish priest of the Mostar Cathedral (1998–02) Pastoral Vicar of the Diocese of Mostar-Duvno (2002–11) Director of the Pontifical Mission Societies in Bosnia and Herzegovina (2011–16) Parish priest of Studenci (2016–2021) Bishop of Kotor (2021–2023)

Orders
- Ordination: 29 June 1986 by Pavao Žanić
- Consecration: 7 April 2021 by Marin Barišić

Personal details
- Born: 10 May 1960 (age 66) Pješiva, Stolac, Bosnia and Herzegovina, Yugoslavia
- Denomination: Catholic
- Education: High Philosophical-Theological School in Sarajevo
- Motto: Bog je ljubav "God is love"
- Coat of arms

Ordination history
History
Priestly ordination
- Ordained by: Pavao Žanić
Episcopal consecration
- Principal consecrator: Marin Barišić
- Co-consecrators: Rrok Gjonlleshaj Petar Palić

Ivan Štironja (born 10 May 1960) is a Croatian prelate of the Catholic Church who has served as the bishop of Poreč-Pula since 2023. He previously briefly served as the bishop of Kotor in Montenegro, from 2021 to 2023.

Originally from the village of Pješivac near Stolac, Štironja was ordained as a priest of the Diocese of Trebinje-Mrkan in 1986. Since then, he dedicated himself to missionary work, spending time in Tanzania from 1988 to 1992 and then among the Croatian community in Canada from 1993 to 1996. Štiornja then went to Padua in Italy, specialising in pastoral liturgy from 1996 to 1998 and at the same time working with the Croatian community there. The bishop of Mostar-Duvno Ratko Perić invited him to the new post of the parish priest of the Mostar cathedral, where he served from 1998 to 2002 when he was appointed the diocesan vicar for pastoral care, a post he held until 2011. Pope Benedict XVI appointed him the national director of the Papal Missions of Bosnia and Herzegovina in 2011, where he served until 2016. In 2016, Štironja was named a parish priest in Studenci near Ljubuški. In 2020, Pope Francis appointed Štironja the new bishop of Kotor in Montenegro. He was consecrated and installed as the bishop of Kotor in April 2021. After serving less than two years, he was appointed the bishop of Poreč-Pula in January 2023.

== Early life and education ==
Bishop Štironja was born into a Herzegovinian Croat Catholic family of Stojan Štironja and Anica Bošković in Pješivac near Stolac, in the family of ten children: three sons and seven daughters, one of whom died as a child. At the time when he was born, his village belonged to the parish of Prenj, and now it is a part of the parish of Aldanići of the Diocese of Trebinje-Mrkan.

Štironja attended elementary school in Pileta near Crnići from 1967 to 1975. After finishing elementary school, Štironja continued his education toward the priesthood. He enrolled at a Jesuit seminary in Dubrovnik, Croatia, where he studied from 1975 to 1979. He was then drafted for obligatory military service in the Yugoslav People's Army and served in Vis and Šibenik in Croatia from 1979 to 1980. After leaving the military, Štironja studied at the High Philosophical-Theological School in Sarajevo, the capital of Bosnia and Herzegovina, from 1980 to 1986.

Štironja was ordained a priest by the Bishop of Mostar-Duvno and the Apostolic Administrator of Trebinje-Mrkan Pavao Žanić on 29 June 1986. He briefly served as a chaplain in Dračevo from 1986 to 1987 before applying for missionary work.

== Pastoral work ==
In 1988, not long after becoming a priest, Štironja applied himself to missionary work and prepared for half a year in London for missions in Africa and studying English. His first missionary work was in the parish of Kaning'ombe in the Diocese of Iringa in Tanzania. While working there, he contracted malaria. Štironja worked there from 1988 to 1992. At the orders of Žanić, he went to work amongst the Croatian community in Canada in the Croatian parish of Oakville of the Diocese of Hamilton, staying there for three and a half years, from 1993 to 1996. While serving in Canada, Štironja edited the parish bulletin and regularly aired a Sunday message for Croatian Catholics from the Radio of Toronto.

Žanić's successor Ratko Perić sent him for studies in Padua, Italy. There, at the Institute of Pastoral Liturgy from 1996 to 1998, he studied liturgical subjects and specialised in pastoral liturgy. At the same time, he cared for the Croatian community in Padua and Milan. In 1998, Štironja was recalled by Perić to serve as the parish priest of the Mostar cathedral. In December 1999, Štironja was appointed the diocesan director for missionary work and was a contributor for the "Radosna vijest" magazine of the Papal missionary works for the territories of Croatia and Bosnia and Herzegovina. In 2002, Perić appointed him a diocesan vicar for pastoral work. In March 2011, Pope Benedict XVI appointed Štironja, the national director of the Papal Missions in Bosnia and Herzegovina, where Štironja worked until September 2016. In October 2016, Štironja was appointed the parish priest in Studenci, Ljubuški and the rector of the Sanctuary of the Most Holy Heart of Jesus.

Štironja also worked for the diocesan magazine "Crkva na kamenu", where he edited the pastoral-liturgical rubric from 1998 to 2006, and from 2007 to 2021, the missionary rubric titled "Za evangelizaciju naroda" (English: For the evangelisation of peoples).

== Episcopacy ==
On 22 December 2020, Pope Francis appointed Štironja the new bishop of Kotor in Montenegro. The diocese was administered by the archbishop of Bar, Rrok Gjonlleshaj, since the retirement of the last bishop of Kotor, Ilija Janjić, in 2019. Although Štironja's consecration was planned to be held in Kotor, due to the COVID-19 pandemic, he was consecrated in the Mostar cathedral on 7 April 2021. His principal consecrator was the archbishop of Split, Marin Barišić, while Gjonlleshaj and the bishop of Mostar-Duvno, Petar Palić, served as co-consecrators. Štironja chose "Bog je ljubav" (God is love) as his episcopal motto. He was installed on 27 April 2021.

On 31 January 2023, Štironja was appointed the bishop of Poreč-Pula, succeeding Dražen Kutleša, who served as the diocese's apostolic administrator since 2020. He was installed on 18 March 2023, while Archbishop of Bar Rrok Gjonlleshaj was appointed the apostolic administrator of Kotor the same day.

== Personal life ==
Besides his native Croatian, Štironja speaks English, Italian and Swahili.

== Footnotes ==
Catholic Church titles
| Preceded by Ilija Janjić | Bishop of Kotor; 2021–2023 | Succeeded by Mladen Vukšić |
| Preceded by Dražen Kutleša | Bishop of Poreč-Pula; 2023–present | Succeeded by Incumbent |
