= Marko Perić =

Montenegrin prelate

The Most Reverend Marko Perić
- Bishop of Kotor
- Church: Catholic Church
- Diocese: Kotor
- Appointed: 29 April 1981
- Installed: 26 July 1981
- Term ended: 5 June 1983
- Predecessor: Pavao Butorac
- Successor: Ivo Gugić
- Other posts: General Vicar of Mostar-Duvno and Trebinje-Mrkan (1970–71; 1980–81) General Provicar of Mostar-Duvno and Trebinje-Mrkan (1971–80) Bishop's secretary (1970–80)

Orders
- Ordination: 29 June 1952
- Consecration: 26 July 1981 by Michele Cecchini

Personal details
- Born: 14 October 1926 Donji Jasenjani near Mostar, Kingdom of Serbs, Croats, and Slovenes
- Died: 5 June 1983 (aged 56) Rome, Italy
- Buried: Mostar cathedral
- Denomination: Catholic
- Education: University of Zagreb
- Motto: Sav sam tvoj, o Bože, po Mariji! (I am all yours, O God, by Mary!)

Marko Perić (Montenegrin: Марко Перић; 14 October 1926 – 5 June 1983) was a Montenegrin prelate of the Catholic Church who served as the bishop of Kotor from 1981 until 1983.

A native of Mostar, Perić was ordained a priest in 1952. After holding several priestly duties, he was appointed a secretary of bishop Petar Čule of Mostar-Duvno and Trebinje-Mrkan. At the same time, he served both as general vicar and general provicar. Čule's successor Pavao Žanić also named him general vicar in 1980, a post he retained until his appointment as the bishop of Kotor in 1981.

== Biography ==
Perić was born in Donji Jasenjani near Mostar in the parish of Bijelo Polje, at the time part of the Kingdom of Serbs, Croats, and Slovenes, to a family with nine children – four brothers and five sisters. He attended the elementary school of the Franciscan sisters in Bijelo Polje near Mostar from 1934 to 1938. Afterward, in 1938, he enrolled at the gymnasium in Travnik, where he studied until 7th grade which he finished in 1945. He continued his last high school grade only in 1947 in Šalata, Zagreb, where he graduated in 1948. In 1949, Perić entered the Catholic Faculty of Theology, University of Zagreb, and graduated in 1953. There, he also earned his master's degree in 1954 and Ph.D. in 1966.

Perić was ordained a priest of the Diocese of Mostar-Duvno on 29 June 1952 in Zagreb. At first, he served as a spiritual assistant in Bijelo Polje and Drežnica until 1953. Then, in 1954, he was appointed a chaplain in Rašeljke near Duvno. Afterward, he served as a parson in Vinica near Ljubuški from 1954 to 1956 and in Šipovača, also near Ljubuški, from 1956 to 1957.

He was appointed a secretary of bishop Petar Čule, a post he held from 1958 to 1980. At the same time, from 1970 to 1971, Perić was a general vicar of the dioceses of Mostar-Duvno and Trebinje-Mrkan. Afterward, he was general provicar with the powers of general vicar from 1971 to 1980. In 1972, Pope Paul VI granted him the title of monsignor. After Čule's retirement, Perić was appointed general vicar of his successor Pavao Žanić, and served as such from 1980 to 1981.

On 29 April 1981, Perić was appointed by Pope John Paul II to become the first bishop of Kotor after the vacancy of over 30 years. His episcopal consecration took place in Kotor Cathedral on 26 July 1981. Perić died in Rome on 5 June 1983.

== Works ==
Perić's capital work is Hercegovačka afera (Herzegovina Affair), compiled between 1965 and 1977, and published posthumously in 2002. His book deals with Herzegovina Affair, a historical dispute between the Franciscan Province of Herzegovina and the Diocese of Mostar-Duvno. He also published numerous other works.
