= Gornja Topla Reber =

- Location in Slovenia
- Coordinates: 45°45′40.58″N 14°58′33.73″E
- Country: Slovenia
- Traditional region: Lower Carniola
- Statistical region: Southeast Slovenia
- Municipality: Kočevje
- Elevation: 838.9 m (2,752 ft)

Population (2002)
  - Total: none

Gornja Topla Reber (pronounced [ˈɡoːɾnja ˈtɔːpla ˈɾeːbəɾ]; German: Oberwarmberg) is a remote abandoned settlement in the Municipality of Kočevje in southern Slovenia. The area is part of the traditional region of Lower Carniola and is now included in the Southeast Slovenia Statistical Region. Its territory is now part of the village of Topla Reber.

== Name ==
The name Gornja Topla Reber 'upper Topla Reber' contrasts with neighboring Dolnja Topla Reber 'lower Topla Reber', which stands 137 meters (449 ft) below the former. The shared part of the names means 'warm slope', referring to the geographical position of the settlements on a sun-exposed southwest-facing slope. The semantically corresponding German names Oberwarmberg and Unterwarmberg share the same contrastive relation.

== History ==
Gornja Topla Reber was a village inhabited by Gottschee Germans. In the winter of 1941–1942 one of the first Partisan bases in the Kočevje area was established in the vicinity. The settlement was burned by Italian troops on 14 August 1942 during the Rog Offensive. Together with Dolnja Topla Reber, it was merged into the settlement of Topla Reber in 1955.

== Church ==
The church in Gornja Topla Reber was a chapel of ease and pilgrimage church located at the top of Saint Peter's Hill (Slovene: Sveti Peter, German: Petersberg, elevation: 888 meters or 2,913 feet), also known as Mount Kočevje (Slovene: Kočevska gora), which stands northeast of the former village. The church belonged to the parish of Dolnja Topla Reber (German: Unterwarmberg). The church was located on the site of what is believed to have been a fort in late antiquity based on archaeological finds. The church was dedicated to Saint Peter, and it was listed in records in 1463 and again in the 16th century by Paolo Bisanti. During the Ottoman wars in Europe, the site functioned as a signal station, and the lower part of the church's belltower may have been built on the foundations of a watchtower. The church had a gabled nave covered in shakes over what was probably a flat wooden ceiling. There were narrow windows, rounded at the top, on the south side of the nave, and the entry to the church was through a portico supported by a pair of columns. The altar was created in the late 17th century and featured a statue of Saint Peter in the center, probably dating from the 19th century as a replacement of an older work. The church's square belltower stood on the south side of the chancel, and it was topped by a tall pointed Neo-Gothic roof. The church was destroyed in a military operation on April 13, 1945.
