= Herzegovina Affair =

19th-century conflict in Bosnia and Herzegovina

Herzegovina Affair (Croatian: Hercegovačka afera) or Herzegovina Case (Croatian: Hercegovački slučaj) refers to a conflict between the Franciscan Province of Herzegovina and the Diocese of Mostar-Duvno over the redistribution of parishes in the said diocese. The conflict between the Franciscans and the diocesan clergy started with the restoration of the regular church hierarchy in Bosnia and Herzegovina after its occupation by Austria-Hungary in 1881. The Herzegovina Case presents a problem in the relationship between the Herzegovinian clergy as well as the Catholic faithful.

== History ==
=== Bishop Paškal Buconjić ===
In 1846, the Holy See established the Apostolic Vicariate of Herzegovina, which was then part of the Ottoman Empire, and it was considered to be a mission area. The first vicars were all Franciscans, including Fr. Rafo Barišić, fr. Anđeo Kraljević and fr. Paškal Buconjić. Both Barišić and Kraljević requested from the Pope to introduce secular clergy in Herzegovina, which was finally approved after the fall of the Ottoman Empire in the region, and in 1881, with the papal bull Ex hac augusta the Apostolic Vicariate was elevated to the Diocese of Mostar-Duvno.

The Franciscans of Herzegovina were on bad terms with Bishop Kraljević, claiming he did not give them enough of the collected alms for the construction of the friary in Humac. The conflict between the bishop and the Franciscans reached its peak during Buconjić's tenure because Franciscans controlled all of the parishes in Herzegovina while the bishop, even though a Franciscan himself, wanted to have diocesan clergy at his disposal. An anonymous letter was sent to Emperor Franz Joseph claiming the bishop was giving donations sent to him by Austria-Hungary to the Ottomans and accusing him of being a turkophile. The Franciscan Custody barred itself from this letter.

In February 1877, Kraljević asked the Propaganda to send an apostolic visitor to Herzegovina and accused Buconjić of neglecting the parishes and the Herzegovinian Franciscans of taking the payment for maintenance by force from the believers during the Easter Communion. The Congregation appointed Bishop Kazimir Forlani the apostolic visitor; he arrived in Mostar in February the next year. Forlani finished his report in May 1878; he advised the Bishop to act in agreement with the Franciscans, to record revenues and expenditures, and to help the construction of the friary in Humac. The question of the parishes remained unresolved.

The main issue during Buconjić's episcopate diocese was the division of parishes between the diocesan clergy and the Franciscans, who tried to confirm their dominance in Herzegovina with Rome. Even though the papal bull Ex hac augusta ended the privileges the Franciscans enjoyed in their missionary work, they still wanted to retain all of the parishes in the diocese. The Franciscans were confident that Buconjić, a Franciscan, would not disturb their possession of parishes. In December 1881, however, Custos Zovko wrote to the Order's General about the parishes in Herzegovina. The General asked Zovko about the right of possession of those parishes, to which Zovko replied in February 1882 that the Franciscans had established and controlled those parishes and, therefore, had patronage over them. That December, Zovko again asked the General about the situation with the parishes in Herzegovina; the General responded that Herzegovinian Franciscans have nothing to fear since Buconjić loved the Franciscan Custody. Buconjić confirmed to the General he would not take the parishes from the Franciscans but would retain the newly established parishes for the diocese.

The new Custos, Luka Begić, who was elected in May 1883, became concerned the position of the Franciscans would be endangered, even if only the diocese controlled only the newly established parishes, and insisted even those parishes should belong to the Franciscan Custody. He talked to Buconjić about the issue; Buconjić complied with his concerns and agreed the newly established parishes should belong to the Custody. Begić informed the General about the agreement in July 1883; he received no reply so he wrote again in March 1885, when Buconjić was supposed to visit Rome and settle the issue. That May, the General's deputy Andrea Lupori replied, asking Buconjić to take with him the contract about the parishes he signed and the definitors of the Custody.

The Custody decided Begić should follow Buconjić to Rome with the instruction the Franciscans should retain the parishes west of the Neretva River while the bishop should dispose of those on the eastern bank; in the case this would not be accepted, Begić was instructed to give in "as least as possible". Buconjić and Begić arrived in Rome on 12 May 1885. The Propaganda received Begić's request in June 1885, and they informed the State Secretariat about the issue. Secretary of State Cardinal Luigi Jacobini asked Nuncio Cardinal Serafino Vannutelli in Vienna to ask Buconjić about the parishes the Franciscans were supposed to retain and those that were at his disposal. In December 1885, Vannutelli asked Buconjić whether he agreed with Begić's proposal or to write which parishes the Franciscans should retain and which should be at his disposal. In January 1886, Buconjić informed Vannutelli he would not take the parishes from the Franciscans.

Upon receiving Buconjić's answer, Vannutelli informed Jacobini that the agreement between the Franciscans and Buconjić should not be confirmed and that the parishes should be divided as in Bosnia, where the situation was the same as in Herzegovina. Vannutelli proposed at least one-third of the parishes should be under the disposal of the bishop, but because Buconjić was a Franciscan himself, Vannutelli considered it would be impossible to bring a new solution and that the Herzegovinian Custos should be informed Rome did not want to make any new decrees because there was a harmony between the bishop and the friars. Jacobini accepted Vannutelli's position. Thus, Rome kept the issue unresolved. Friar Lujo Radoš fruitlessly urged the Congregation for Extraordinary Ecclesiastical Affairs in March 1888.

Lupori advised Friar Nikola Šimović to explain the Franciscans' position on the matter to the Nuncio in Vienna and to try to get a confirmation for their proposal. At the end of October 1889, he visited the Nuncio, who told him he would try to resolve the matter in the interest of the Franciscans. After returning to Mostar, Šimović wrote to the Nuncio again, reminding him of Radoš's proposal from 1888. The Nuncio replied in December 1889, promising to support such a proposal. The issue, however, remained unresolved for years.

In 1892, the Franciscan Custody of Herzegovina was elevated to a province. After Begić was elected Provincial in 1898, he tried to broker any deal he could rather than hold the insecure status quo. Buconjić was supposed to visit Rome after Easter in 1899, which Begić saw as an opportunity to resolve the issue of parishes. Custos Rafael Radoš was supposed to join Buconjić in Rome but died in March 1899. In April of that year, Begić wrote to the General of the Order to represent the Franciscan Province in Herzegovina. Buconjić discussed the issue with Begić; both men wanted to preserve the strong Franciscan presence in the Diocese of Mostar-Duvno. Buconjić proposed that 25 parishes should belong to the Franciscans while 12 would be at the bishop's disposal. Buconjić also proposed the establishment of 12 additional parishes that would be at the bishop's disposal.

Pope Leo XIII confirmed the Decisia on 17 July 1899; 14 parishes were designated to the diocesan clergy while others were left to the Franciscans. Buconjić postponed the publication of the pope's decision until 1908; both Buconjić and the Franciscans were unsatisfied with the decision. The beginning of this publication states, "We considered it adequate to present before the eyes of the priests of our dioceses, and especially to the young ones, the copies of the solemn Decisia concerning the parishes established or those ought to be established. This Decisia must remain solid and constant to avoid any dissent or changeability of wishes." He asked the pope for permission to trust certain dioceses to the Franciscans because he lacked the diocesan priests. With time, however, the Deceisa remained neither solid nor constant, and "the dissent and changeability of wishes" were not avoided. The will of Buconjić about the division of the parishes was not respected.

=== Bishop Alojzije Mišić ===
After becoming a bishop, Mišić only had 12 diocesan priests at his disposal, while the rest of the clergy was made of the Franciscans. The Balkan Wars and the World War I halted the possibility of educating additional diocesan priests while the number of Franciscans grew. The circumstances demanded the establishment of new parishes, and like his predecessor, Mišić had the authority to appoint the Franciscans to the new parishes with the approval from the general of the Franciscan Order. The Herzegovinian Franciscans used the leverage by letting Mišić know that the Franciscans would not serve the new parishes unless they were legally transferred to them. Mišić cared little about raising the diocesan clergy even though as of 1925, the Propaganda sent him some 2,000 United States dollars monthly for the secular clergy. The money remained unused and perished in banks during the World War II. He also refused to appoint newly ordained secular priests to parishes.

As a bishop, Mišić established 14 new parishes and constructed 21 churches and 24 parish residences. Among the parishes he established are Čapljina (1917), Izbično (1917), Čitluk (1918), Gradac-Blizanci (1918), Tepčići (1918), Jablanica (1919), Grljevići (1919), Kongora (1921), Prisoje (1922), Kruševo (1924), Ledinac (1930), Rašeljke (1934), Crnač (1935) and Šipovača (1939). The first major conflict between the Franciscans and the Diocese occurred in 1917, after the establishment of the Parish of Čapljina. Čapljina was supposed to be handed to the diocesan clergy, but Mišić didn't enact the transfer.

The Herzegovinian Franciscans used Mišić's origin as an uninformed Bosnian outsider to try to change Decisia, the decision from 1899 on the division of parishes between them end the diocesan clergy issued by the Holy See, to their advantage. On 25 April 1922, the Provincial of the Herzegovinian Franciscans Alojzije Bubalo wrote a petition for the pope to give them the parishes that were designated for the diocesan clergy by Decisia. They demanded that all the existing parishes and those that would be established in the Diocese of Mostar-Duvno belong to them, as well as the parish of Neum that belonged to the Diocese of Trebinje-Mrkan. The Franciscans reasoned that their request was justified since there was a lack of the diocesan clergy in the diocese, with only three priests active. However, the main reason for the lack of the secular clergy was insufficient care of the previous bishop, Bucnjić, and the current bishop, Mišić, over raising the secular clergy. At the time, Mišić was supposed to travel to Rome for an ad limina visit with the pope and was accompanied by friar Jerko Boras, custos of the Herzegovinian Franciscans. Boras was supposed to petition the General of the Franciscan Order Bernardino Klumper, who would discuss the issue with the pope. Since Klumper wasn't present then, the petition was given to Callisto Zuccotti, the procurator of the Franciscan Order. Before giving the petition to the pope, Zuccotti invited Mišić, the protector of the Franciscan Order Cardinal Oreste Giorgi, and Boras to discuss the issue. They concluded that Mišić personally should modify and give the petition to the pope.

Mišić modified the petition on 22 May 1922, and presented it as his own. The only difference between the two versions was that in Mišić's version, there's no distinction between the current and the future parishes that ought to be established. The reason for such a change was that the previous version opposed the canon law, which decreed that any newly established parish on the territory of an already existing one belongs to the bishop and not to any religious order. The Congregation on the Extraordinary Ecclesiastical Affairs asked Mišić to give them a list of parishes that would be at the disposal of the bishop. In the end, the Congregation refused to accept the petition and requested that the bishop's consistory should approve it.

Upon the Congregation's refusal to accept the petition, Mišić ignored the whole issue. Only after Bubalo's insistence did Mišić agree to send a petition but ask Bubalo to write it. Bubalo wrote another petition on 20 May 1923. In this petition, Bubalo requested that besides the 25 parishes that belong to the Franciscans according to Decisia, additional 27 parishes be given to them, of which 13 haven't been established yet at the time, while 21 parishes would be reserved for the diocesan clergy (at the time, only 8 such parishes existed). His petition received Mišić's recommendation, with the approval from the bishop's consistory, made of Boras and another diocesan priest Marijan Kelava, on 3 June 1923 and was sent by Bubalo to the procurator of the Franciscan Order in Rome on 12 June 1923. The Congregation ruled by a rescript on 22 June 1923 that the bishop can give the requested parishes to the Franciscans until the Holy See doesn't decree otherwise. This event marked the beginning of the Herzegovina Affair. His manners and incorrect information sent to the Vatican about the situation of the Church in Herzegovina bolstered the dispute.

On 26 April 1924, Bubalo asked for approval from the General Definitory of the Franciscan Order to take over the parishes. The Congregation for Institutes of Consecrated Life and Societies of Apostolic Life gave power to the General of the Franciscan Order to approve the request of the Herzegovinian Franciscans on 27 May 1924, and the General approved the request on 30 May 1924. Accordingly, on 10 January 1925, Bubalo requested Mišić to enact the rescript from 1923 since the Herzegovinian Franciscans gained the necessary approval from the General Definitory. Mišić enacted the rescript on 15 May 1925 with changes, placing Gabela and Glavatičevo under the Franciscan instead of the diocesan control while putting Prisoje and Dobrič under the diocesan control. Displeased with the change, the Franciscans asked Mišić not to change the rescript. However, Mišić considered this to be a good decision, and the change remained. Perić writes that a possible motive behind the change was Mišić's hope that the Franciscans would refuse the changes so that the whole matter could come before Rome once again. Mišić never publicly published his decree out of fear of the reaction of the diocesan clergy.

Buconjić bought land for a new cathedral church in the Rondo quarter of Mostar, that belonged to the parish of Guvno. The land for the new cathedral was later put under a lien in benefit of the Franciscan Custody of Herzegovina due to debt; at that time, Buconjić was bedridden. Mišić intended to continue the construction and ordered 250 square meters of hewn stone laying for the future cathedral, but never started the construction. The cathedral was never built, and the land was later confiscated by the Yugoslav communist authorities, who constructed House of Culture on its place. The Franciscan intention to take the parish of Guvno for themselves is seen as a possible reason for the delay in construction by Perić.

The joint efforts of Mišić and the Franciscans to change the Vatican's decision became known to the diocesan clergy only in 1937. When the archivist and a diocesan priest Petar Čule found out about the rescript and its enactment, he was assured by Mišić's secretary friar Boris Ilovača that the rescript wasn't enacted, even though he himself logged both the rescript and Mišić's decision on enactment. In 1935, Mišić gave Čule the care over the education of diocesan priests. Their number started to grow, with many Franciscans commenting that there would not be enough parishes for them. In 1937, in the parish of Drinovci, the diocesan clergy became aware of the rescript and its enactment, which led to panic in its ranks as the diocese was almost dissolved. Their worries were brought before Ilovača, who again assured them, falsely claiming that Mišić hadn't confirmed the rescript. Mišić cared little about his own clergy, ordaining only 28 diocesan priests and later limiting the number of Herzegovinian candidates in 1939 at the Seminary in Travnik to only 33, possibly under the influence of the Franciscans.

In 1937, at a general chapter of the Franciscan Province of Herzegovina, the Franciscans asked the bishop to secure a Herzegovinian Franciscan as his successor by appointing him bishop coadjutor. In this letter, they wrote that Herzegovina was "Franciscan for seven centuries, soaked in their sweat and martyr's blood" and that they preserved "Croathood and Catholicism in Herzegovina". They wrote that Mišić was "a great son of the Franciscan Order" and that within him lives the "Franciscan spirit" and that they will not allow this spirit to be diminished or truncated. Unaware of the Franciscans' request, the diocesan priests held their own annual meeting, during which they sent a memorandum to the bishop, asking him about the situation with the parishes. However, Mišić never gave an official response.

In 1939, the diocesan priests, nevertheless, informed the metropolitan archbishop of Vrhbosna Ivan Šarić about the situation with the parishes, and in turn, he informed the apostolic nuncio in Belgrade. Thus, the matter reached Rome once again. In 1940, the issue was discussed before the Propaganda and the Congregation for Extraordinary Ecclesiastical Affairs. Cardinal Giuseppe Bruno, who signed the rescript in 1923, stated that the Franciscans' petition was written by stating falsehoods or by concealing the truth, as they requested the parishes that weren't established yet at the time. In 1941, Bruno again wrote on the issue, stating that the 21 parishes supposed to be under the bishop's disposal weren't given to him and that it was not enacted (as he was wrongly informed then). Moreover, Bruno claimed that the rescript of 1923 was void since the Franciscans hadn't gained the necessary permission from the Congregation for Institutes of Consecrated Life and Societies of Apostolic Life to take over the parishes designated for the diocesan clergy. Nevertheless, the rescript wasn't recalled until 1965.

=== Bishop Petar Čule ===
The Contract on the Parish of Čapljina was signed only in 1969 between another Bishop Petar Čule and Provincial Fr. Rufin Šičić. However, this contract wasn't enacted either due to the opposition from the parishioners in Čapljina.

In 1968, the parishioners expelled Archbishop of Zagreb Franjo Kuharić and Bishop Petar Čule from Široki Brijeg, and a diocesan priest in Grude was expelled in a trunk of a car.

In 1975, the Holy See issued a new decree Romanis Pontificibus regarding the redistribution of parishes. According to Romanis Pontificibus, one-half of parishes would be controlled by the Franciscans and the other half by the diocesan clergy. The Franciscans opposed the decree, claiming it wasn't written nor signed by the Pope. On 10 July 1976, the Franciscan Province of Herzegovina wrote to the Pope that they "cannot take the responsibility for the consequences that would follow after they accept the decree". The Holy See removed the Provincial Administration, and the Order's Minister-General managed the province in Rome through his designated delegate.

The fierce opposition against the enforcement of Romanis Pontificibus from the Franciscans stalled the enactment of the decree until 1996.

=== Bishop Pavao Žanić ===
The Mostar Cathedral of Mary, Mother of the Church was completed in the summer of 1980 and consecrated on 14 September 1980 by Cardinal Franjo Šeper, Prefect of the Congregation for the Doctrine of the Faith. It was decided to split the parish of SS to create the cathedral parish. Peter and Paul. The Franciscans objected to this as being unfair. Friars Ivica Vego and Ivan Prusina, were chaplains in the parish of SS Peter and Paul in Mostar, who refused to obey the Papal decree Romanis Pontificibus and relocate from the parish. After several warnings, Bishop Žanić suspended their priestly faculties throughout the dioceses under his jurisdiction. (Honorius Pontoglio, General Vicar of the Order of Friars Minor expelled Fr. Ivan Prusina from the Order on 29 January 1982).

=== Bishop Ratko Perić ===
On 2 April 1995, Bishop Ratko, along with his secretary, was abducted and beaten by Croat militiamen at a local Franciscan chapel. They were held for eight hours until rescued by UN peacekeepers and the Mayor of Mostar. The abduction was retaliation for Perić's intention to replace the Franciscans with diocesan priests in several parishes as well because of his criticism of the unconfirmed apparitions of Mary, mother of Jesus in Medjugorje. He was released only after the intervention from the Mayor of Mostar and UNPROFOR.

Yet another attempt to enforce Romanis Pontificibus was made by another Bishop Ratko Perić on 12 May 1996. Several parishes were transferred to the diocesan clergy, but the transfer of clergy in Čapljina caused a disturbance. The entry of the diocesan clergy in Čapljina was physically disrupted, and the church doors were walled up. Three Franciscans that remained in Čapljina, despite the Pope's decree, were expelled from the Franciscan Order and their priestly jurisdiction was revoked in 1998.
