= Mladen Vukšić =

Bosnian-born Montenegrin Roman Catholic bishop (born 1965)

His Excellency Mladen Vukšić, O.F.M.
- Bishop of Kotor
- Church: Catholic Church
- Diocese: Diocese of Kotor
- Appointed: 12 September 2024
- Predecessor: Rrok Gjonlleshaj (Apostolic Administrator)

Orders
- Ordination: 26 July 1992
- Consecration: 23 November 2024

Personal details
- Born: 28 December 1965 (age 60) Ljubuški, Bosnia and Herzegovina, SFR Yugoslavia
- Denomination: Catholic
- Coat of arms

Mladen Vukšić, O.F.M. (born 28 December 1965) is a Bosnian-born Roman Catholic prelate who has served as the Bishop of Kotor in Montenegro since 2024.

== Early life and education ==
Vukšić was born on 28 December 1965 in Ljubuški, Bosnia and Herzegovina at the Bosnian Croat family. He entered the novitiate of the Order of Friars Minor (Franciscans) on 14 July 1984 at Humac and made his first vows the following year. After serving his compulsory military service in Skopje and Kumanovo (now North Macedonia), he studied theology at the Franciscan Faculty in Makarska (1986–1989) and in Bologna, Italy (1989–1992), where he completed his philosophical and theological formation.

Vukšić made his solemn profession in the Franciscan order on 16 September 1990 and was ordained deacon on 29 June 1991 in Mostar and priest on 26 July 1992 in Čitluku.

== Ministry and ecclesiastical roles ==
After ordination, Vukšić began his pastoral ministry as parish vicar at Humac between 1992 and 1994. He continued to pursue specialized formation, earning a licentiate in youth pastoral care and catechetics from the Pontifical Salesian University in Rome in 1997.

Following his postgraduate studies, he served as formator of seminarians in Zagreb from 1997 to 2000. Subsequently, he was guardian and parish priest of the parish of St. Vlaho in Slano (2000–2003), and then parish priest of St. Franjo parish in Posušje Grac (2003–2010) and St. Peter and Paul parish in Kočerin (2010–2013).

From 2013 until his episcopal appointment in 2024, he served as parish priest of the Parish of the Immaculate Conception of the Blessed Virgin Mary in Posušje, one of the larger parishes in the Diocese of Mostar-Duvno.

Within his religious province — the Herzegovinian Franciscan Province of the Assumption of the Blessed Virgin Mary — Vukšić served multiple terms as a member of the provincial council and was a definitor at the time of his episcopal appointment.

He founded the first fraternity of the Franjevačka mladež (Frama) in Herzegovina in 1992, an organization dedicated to youth engagement and formation in the Franciscan tradition.

== Episcopacy ==
On 12 September 2024, Pope Francis appointed Vukšić as Bishop of Kotor, succeeding Bishop Ivan Štironja following his transfer to the Diocese of Poreč and Pula. He was consecrated as bishop on 23 November 2024 at the Cathedral of Saint Tryphon in Kotor, with Archbishop Dražen Kutleša as principal consecrator and Bishops Zdenko Križić and Rrok Gjonlleshaj as co-consecrators.

In interviews, Vukšić emphasized his intent to live among the people of the Diocese of Kotor in close pastoral solidarity and to bring his Franciscan charism into his episcopal ministry.

== See also ==
- Diocese of Kotor
- Catholic Church in Montenegro
