= Giuseppe Pamphilj =

Giuseppe Pamphilj may refer to:

- Giuseppe Doria Pamphili (1751–1816), Catholic cardinal
- Giuseppe Pamphilj (bishop of Kotor) (1580–1622), Catholic bishop
- Giuseppe Pamphilj (bishop of Segni) (1525–1581), Catholic bishop
