= Ilija Janjić =

- Diocesan Bishop Emeritus of Roman Catholic Diocese of Kotor
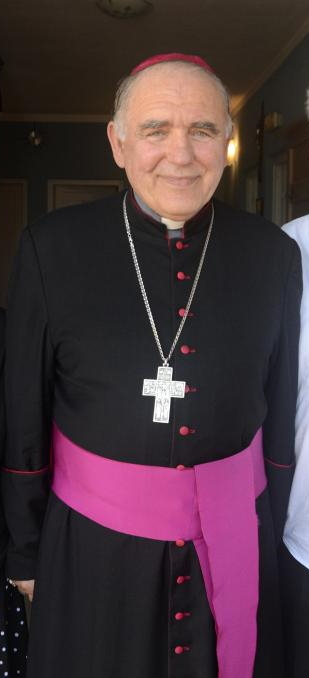
- Church: Catholic Church
- Appointed: 11 March 1996
- Term ended: 28 September 2019
- Predecessor: Ivo Gugić
- Successor: Rrok Gjonlleshaj (Apostolic Administrator)

Orders
- Ordination: 29 June 1969 (Priest)
- Consecration: 27 April 1996 (Bishop) by Ivo Gugić

Personal details
- Born: Ilija Janjić; 20 September 1944 (age 81) Vidovice near Orašje, Independent State of Croatia (present day Bosnia and Herzegovina)

Ilija Janjić (born 20 September 1944) is a Catholic prelate who served as the Diocesan Bishop of Kotor in Montenegro since 11 March 1996 until his retirement on 28 September 2019.

== Life ==
Bishop Janjić was born into a Bosnian Croat Roman Catholic family of Ante and Jela in Bosanska Posavina as their first child. After graduation from schools in his native Vidovice and Orašje, he was admitted to the minor seminary in 1959, consequently joined the Major Theological Seminary in Split in 1963, and was ordained as priest on June 29, 1969 for the Roman Catholic Diocese of Kotor, after completed his philosophical and theological studies.

After his ordination Fr. Janjić served as parish administrator in Muo, Škaljari, Gornji Stoliv, Budva, Prčanj and Herceg Novi. In the meantime, during 1975–1980, he also was a spiritual director in his alma mater – Major Theological Seminary in Split. Last years before his nomination to the bishophood he was a Canon of the Cathedral of Saint Tryphon and Dean of Herceg Novi.

On March 11, 1996, he was appointed by Pope John Paul II as the Diocesan Bishop of the Roman Catholic Diocese of Kotor. On April 27, 1996, he was consecrated as bishop by his predecessor, Bishop emeritus Ivo Gugić and other prelates of the Roman Catholic Church before Cathedral of Saint Tryphon in Kotor.

Retired on September 29, 2019 after reached age limit of 75 years old.

Catholic Church titles
Preceded by Ivo Gugić	Diocesan Bishop of Kotor; 1996–2019	Succeeded by Rrok Gjonlleshaj as Apostolic Administrator
