= Dolnja Topla Reber =

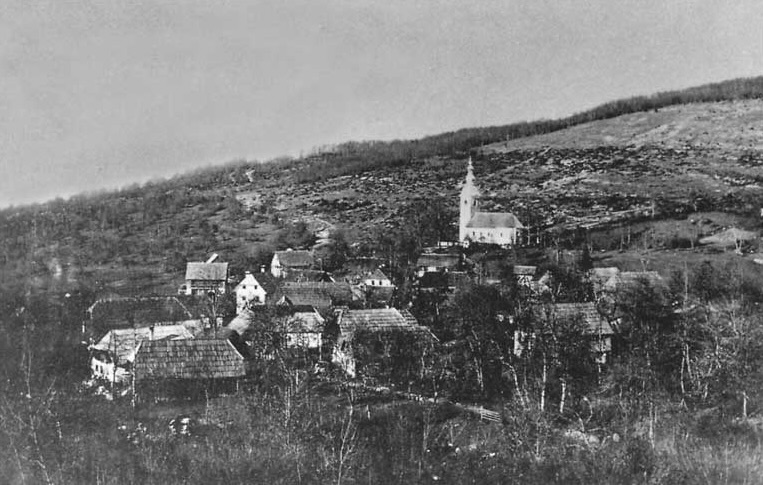
- Dolnja Topla Reber in 1937

- Location in Slovenia
- Coordinates: 45°45′06″N 14°57′45″E
- Country: Slovenia
- Traditional region: Lower Carniola
- Statistical region: Southeast Slovenia
- Municipality: Kočevje
- Elevation: 702.3 m (2,304 ft)

Population (2002)
  - Total: none

Dolnja Topla Reber (pronounced [ˈdoːlnja ˈtɔːpla ˈɾeːbəɾ]; German: Unterwarmberg) is a remote abandoned settlement in the Municipality of Kočevje in southern Slovenia. The area is part of the traditional region of Lower Carniola and is now included in the Southeast Slovenia Statistical Region. Its territory is now part of the village of Topla Reber.

== Name ==
The name Dolnja Topla Reber 'lower Topla Reber' contrasts with neighboring Gornja Topla Reber 'upper Topla Reber', which stands 137 meters (449 ft) above the former. The shared part of the names means 'warm slope', referring to the geographical position of the settlements on a sun-exposed southwest-facing slope. The semantically corresponding German names Unterwarmberg and Oberwarmberg share the same contrastive relation.

== History ==
Dolnja Topla Reber was a village inhabited by Gottschee Germans. In the winter of 1941–1942 one of the first Partisan bases in the Kočevje area was established in the vicinity. The settlement was burned by Italian troops on 14 August 1942 during the Rog Offensive. Together with Gornja Topla Reber, it was merged into the settlement of Topla Reber in 1955.
