= Diocese of Kotor =

Latin Catholic territory in Montenegro

Coordinates: 42.4300°N 18.7700°E

Diocese of Kotor Dioecesis Catharensis

Catholic
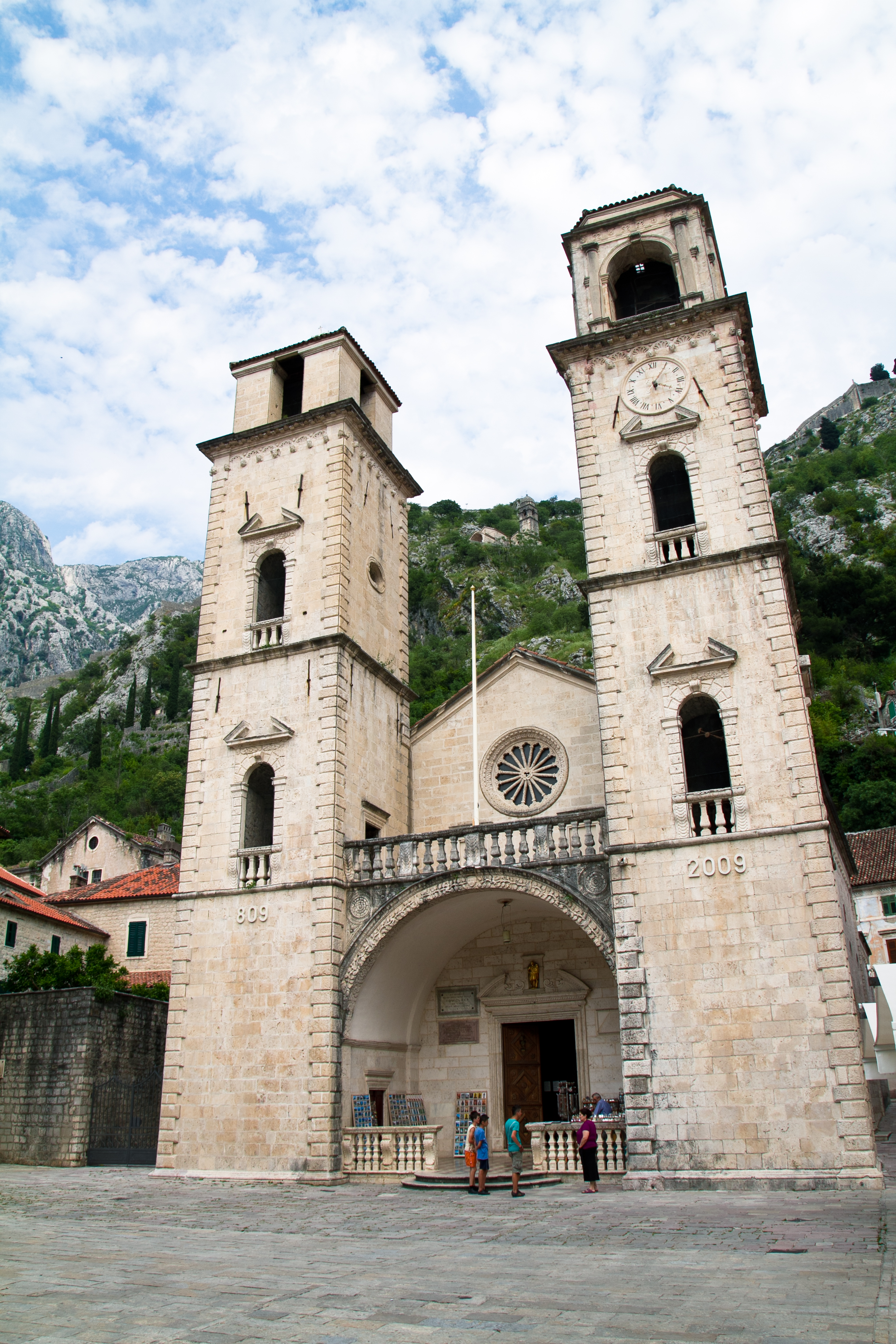
- Cathedral of Saint Tryphon, Kotor

Location
- Country: Montenegro
- Ecclesiastical province: Split-Makarska
- Metropolitan: Archdiocese of Split-Makarska

Statistics
- Area: 674 km^{2} (260 sq mi)
- Population: Total; Catholics: (as of 2013); 95,000; 8,180 (8.6%)

Information
- Denomination: Catholic Church
- Sui iuris church: Latin Church
- Rite: Roman Rite
- Established: 10th Century
- Cathedral: Cathedral of Saint Tryphon

Current leadership
- Pope: Leo XIV
- Bishop: Mladen Vukšić
- Metropolitan Archbishop: Zdenko Križić
- Bishops emeritus: Ilija Janjić

Map
- Map of Montenegro Diocese of Kotor Archdiocese of Bar

The Diocese of Kotor (Serbo-Croatian: Kotorska biskupija, Которска бискупија; Latin: Dioecesis Catharensis) is a Latin Church ecclesiastical jurisdiction or diocese of the Catholic Church in the Bay of Kotor and Municipality of Budva area in Montenegro. It is centered in the city of Kotor (Cattaro). It was erected as a diocese in the 10th century. The current bishop is Mladen Vukšić.

The diocese's cathedral is the Cathedral of Saint Tryphon in Kotor.

== History ==
The first documented bishop of Cattaro was Paulus, who participated in the Council of Chalcedon in 451. The next mention of the Diocese of Cattaro was 530, when it is mentioned as a suffragan of the Archdiocese of Salona (Solin). The late Antiquity era, relatively the early Christian origin of the bishopric of Cattaro, is testified by an early Christian baptistery from the late 5th or early 6th centuries, discovered in an archeological examination of the Church of Saint Maria of Rijeka (Crkva sv. Marije od Rijeke) following the 1979 earthquake where the probable foundations of the first cathedral in Cattaro was discovered with remains, such as the cathedra and ciborium from the 6th century.

John, a bishop of Cattaro, was certainly mentioned in the acts of the Second Council of Nicaea in 787. John was also mentioned in 809 in epigraphical inscriptions found in Cattaro. Bishops of Cattaro were mentioned in Ecclesiastical Assembly of Spalatum in 925 and 928, during the reign of King Tomislav. Only a fragmental list of the bishops before the 11th century were preserved. Afterward, since 1090 till the present day, a complete list has existed, beginning with bishop Grimoald, of Lombard origin.

A Pontifical and Lectionary of the Bishopric is kept in Saint Petersburg. This artifact testifies that Cattaro remained under the jurisdiction of the Western Church following the Great Schism of 1054. In 1025, Pope John XIX issued a papal bull in which Cattaro became a suffragan of the Diocese of Canusium (Canosa). In 1063, Pope Alexander II issued a papal bull in which Cattaro is also mentioned as a suffragan of the Archdiocese of Barium (Bari), previously known as the Diocese of Canusium. In 1067, the diocese became subjected to the Archdiocese of Dioclea-Antivari. Then, in 1078, the diocese became subjected to the Archdiocese of Ragusa (Dubrovnik), only to be returned under the control of Antivari in 1089. In 1120, the diocese of Cattaro was returned under the control of Dubrovnik. Between 1172 and 1828, the diocese was under the control of the Archdiocese of Barium.

Around 1185, Kotor came under the rule of the Serbian Grand Prince Stefan Nemanja, founder of the Nemanjić dynasty which ruled the mediaeval Kingdom of Serbia until the 14th century. The Kotor Diocese received jurisdiction over small Catholic mining and trading communities in the Serbian interior, which brought them into conflict with the Archdiocese of Bar.

Between the 13th and 14th centuries, the borders of the diocese reached the Danube. Under the diocesan jurisdiction were: Prizren, Janjevo, Novo Brdo, Novi Pazar, Brskovo, Golubac, Brvenik, Plana, Mačva, Trepča, Trgovište and Belgrade. After those territories had fallen under the rule of the Ottoman Empire, the Bishops of Kotor continued to claim authority over these Catholic communities. In the 16th century, Bishop Tripo Bisanti signed himself as the Bishop of 'all of Serbia' ("Totius Serviae").

In 1828, the diocese was part of the Kingdom of Dalmatia and became a suffragan of the Archdiocese of Zadar. It also absorbed the territory of the Diocese of Budva at the time. In 1880, the parishes of Spič, Šušanj and Brca, which had originally belonged to the Archdiocese of Antivari, was transferred to the Diocese of Cattaro by the decision of the Sacred Congregation for the Propagation of the Faith.

In 1932, in the Kingdom of Yugoslavia, it became directly subjected to the Holy See. In 1969, in SFR Yugoslavia, the diocese became a suffragan of the Archdiocese of Split-Makarska.

== Patronage ==
The first patron of the diocese was Saint George, who was later replaced by Saint Tryphon, whose relics were brought to Cattaro on 13 January 809. A church dedicated to Saint Tryphon was built in the early 9th century by Andrea Saracenis, a citizen of Cattaro.

== Geography ==
The Diocese of Kotor borders the village of Sutorina (Municipality of Herceg Novi) to the west. To the east, the diocese borders the river of Željeznica near the city of Bar (Antivari). The diocese encompasses the settlements of Herceg Novi, Kotor, Tivat, Risan, Perast, Dobrota, Prčanj, Bijela, Budva and Sutomore.

== Bishops ==
- Paulus (ca. 451 – ????)
- Grimoald (1090 – ????)
- Adam (Adam of Aquitaine) (1349 – 31 July 1352)

...

- Marino Contarini (10 Jul 1430 – 19 Nov 1453 Appointed, Bishop of Treviso)
- Bernardo da Venezia (21 Nov 1453 – 1457 Died)
- Angelo Fasolo (16 Feb 1457 – 7 Nov 1459 Appointed, Bishop of Modon)
- Marco Negro (5 Dec 1459 Confirmed – 29 Mar 1471 Appointed, Bishop of Ossero)
- Antonio de Pago (29 Mar 1471 – )
- Pietro Bruto (1474 – 1493)
- Giovanni Chericato, O. Crucif. (16 Aug 1493 – 1514 Died)
- Trifone Bisanti (2 May 1514 – 1540 Died)
- Luca Bisanti (1540 – 1565 Resigned)
- Paolo Bisanti (12 Oct 1565 – 1578 Resigned)
- Franjo Župan, O.F.M. Conv. (21 Nov 1578 – 1581 Died)
- Girolamo Bucchia (1581 – 1602 Died)
- Angelo Baroni, O.P. (11 Feb 1604 – 31 Aug 1611 Appointed, Bishop of Chioggia)
- Girolamo Rusca, O.P. (5 Dec 1611 – 29 Apr 1620 Appointed, Bishop of Capodistria)
- Giuseppe Pamphilj (15 Jun 1620 – 1622 Died)
- Vincenzo Bucchi (Buschio) (5 Dec 1622 – 1655 Died)
- Ivan Antun Zboronac (24 Jul 1656 – 1688 Resigned)
- Marino Drago (31 May 1688 – 3 Oct 1708 Appointed, Bishop of Korčula)
- Francesco Parchich (Parcic), O.P. (6 May 1709 – May 1715 Died)
- Simone Gritti (30 Mar 1716 – 8 Jun 1718 Appointed, Bishop of Ferentino)
- Giacinto Zanobetti, O.P. (27 Jun 1718 – 10 Aug 1742 Died)
- Vincent Drago (15 Jul 1743 – 2 Aug 1744 Died)
- Giovanni Antonio Castelli (7 Sep 1744 – 29 May 1761 Resigned)
- Stefano dell'Oglio (19 Apr 1762 – 24 Jun 1788 Died)
- Giovanni Martino Bernardoni Baccolo (30 Mar 1789 – 5 Jun 1793 Resigned)
- Mihajlo Mate Spalatin (12 Sep 1794 – 27 Jun 1796 Appointed, Bishop of Šibenik)
- Francesco Pietro Raccamarich (27 Jun 1796 – 20 Jul 1801 Appointed, Bishop of Ossero)
- Marco Antonio Gregorina (28 Sep 1801 – 9 Jun 1815 Died)
- Stefano Pavlovic-Lucic (28 Jan 1828 Confirmed – 27 Feb 1853 Died)
- Vinko Zubranić (7 Apr 1854 Confirmed – 19 Jun 1856 Confirmed, Bishop of Dubrovnik)
- Marko Kalogjera (Calogerà, Calogjera) (19 Jun 1856 Confirmed – 29 Oct 1866 Confirmed, Bishop of Split-Makarska)
- Djordje Marčić (22 Jun 1868 Confirmed – 3 Jan 1879 Died)
- Kazimir Forlani (12 May 1879 – 3 Aug 1887 Died)
- Trifon Radoničić (1 Jun 1888 – 1895 Died)
- Francesco Uccelini-Tice (18 Mar 1895 – 1 Jun 1937 Died)
- Pavao Butorac (5 Jan 1938 – 25 Sep 1950 Appointed, Bishop of Dubrovnik)
- Gracija Ivanović (25 Sept 1950 - 29 Apr 1981; diocesan administrator)
- Marko Perić (29 Apr 1981 – 5 Jun 1983 Died)
- Ivo Gugić (22 Nov 1983 – 11 Mar 1996 Retired)
- Ilija Janjić (11 Mar 1996 – 28 Sep 2019 Retired)
- Rrok Gjonlleshaj (28 Sep 2019 – 27 Apr 2021), Apostolic Administrator
- Ivan Štironja (27 Apr 2021 – 18 Mar 2023)
- Rrok Gjonlleshaj (18 Mar 2023 – 23 Nov 2024), Apostolic Administrator
- Mladen Vukšić (23 Nov 2024 – present)

== See also ==
- Catholic Church in Montenegro
