= Santa Maria delle Carceri =

Santa Maria delle Carceri may refer to:

- Santa Maria delle Carceri, Prato, basilica in Prato, Tuscany
- Abbey of Santa Maria delle Carceri, Camaldolese monastery in Padua; see Antonio Bernardo (humanist)
