= Ivo Gugić =

Montenegrin Catholic bishop (1920–1996)

- Diocesan Bishop of Roman Catholic Diocese of Kotor
- Church: Roman Catholic Church
- Appointed: 22 November 1983
- Term ended: 11 March 1996
- Predecessor: Marko Perić
- Successor: Ilija Janjić

Orders
- Ordination: 13 August 1944 (Priest)
- Consecration: 13 August 1961 (Bishop) by Pavao Butorac

Personal details
- Born: Ivo Gugić; 2 March 1920 Vela Luka, Kingdom of Serbs, Croats and Slovenes (present day in Croatia)
- Died: 3 June 1996 (aged 76) Kotor, Montenegro, FR Yugoslavia (present day in Montenegro)

Bishop Ivo Gugić (2 March 1920 – 3 June 1996) was a Roman Catholic prelate from Croatia, who served as the Diocesan Bishop of Kotor in Montenegro.

== Life ==
He was born on 2 March 1920 in the small town of Vela Luka on the island of Korčula in the Kingdom of Serbs, Croats and Slovenes. Beginning in 1983, he began serving the Church and the people of Montenegro as a bishop in the Diocese of Kotor. In 1996, he ended thirteen years of service as a bishop. (He was succeeded by bishop Ilija Janjić.) However, he continued to work with the Montenegrin government through the committee for the protection of minority and ethnic group rights. He was murdered in the same year in which he retired as a bishop; he died on June 3, 1996, in Kotor.
