= Pietro Bruto =

Italian bishop

- Bishop of Kotor
- Church: Catholic Church
- See: Bishop of Kotor
- Appointed: c. 1474
- Term ended: 1493
- Successor: Giovanni Chericato
- Other post: Bishop of Croja; General Vicar of Vicenza

Orders
- Consecration: 23 April 1469 (Bishop) by Maffeo Gherardi Patriarch of Venice

Personal details
- Born: Venezia, Venetian Republic
- Died: 1493 Vicenza, Venetian Republic

Pietro Bruto (Latin: Petrus de Brutis, died 1493) was bishop of Kruja, and later bishop of Kotor and vicar of Vicenza. He was an author of two fiercely antisemitic books, and he obtained the expulsion of the Jews from Vicenza in 1486.

== Life ==
Pietro Bruto was born in Venice in the early first half of 15th century to a not-noble family. He obtained a university degree in artibus and became an ecclesiastic being ordained priest already in 1456. In 1463 he was parish priest of the church of Saint Agatha in Venice, and he served also as teacher of the altar servers for St Mark's Basilica.

Supported by the Senate, on 26 August 1468 he obtained the appointment of bishop of Kruja (Croja), a town in Albania. He received the episcopal consecration in the church of Corpus Domini in Venice on 23 April 1469 by the hands of the Patriarch of Venice Maffeo Gherardi. It is unknown if he actually resided in Kruja. The town was definitely conquered by the Ottomans in 1478; not being allowed by the Ottomans to stay in Kruja, Pietro Bruto became the vicar of Marco Negro, Bishop of Kotor. In 1474 (Note: In 1471 according the Gams.) he was appointed as bishop of Kotor, however he did not reside permanently in that town.

Since 1471 Petro Bruto was appointed vicar of Cardinal Giovanni Battista Zeno, bishop of Vicenza, where he lived up to his death. In Vicenza his pastoral activity was grounded on his aversion to the Jews, based both on theological reasons and on the disappointment for the alleged (later resulted as false) ritual killing of toddler Simon of Trent. He obtained from the podestà Antonio Bernardo the expulsion of the Jews from Vicenza on 12 June 1486, after which event he wrote a letter thanking the people of Vicenza. He died in early 1493 in Vicenza. He was buried after a funeral in the Vicenza Cathedral.

== Works ==
Petro Bruto is known for two books, both grounded on his fierce antisemitism. A third works of him, De virtute amplectenda, did not arrive to us.

His Epistola contra Iudaeos, published in Vicenza in 1477, is a letter asking justice after the infanticide of Simon of Trent, charging (without proves) the Jews of Trent of this killing as blood ritual (blood libel).

His main work Victoria contra Iudaeos was published in Vicenza in 1489, and never re-printed but it is known a translation in Italian dated 1499. In the first part Bruto demonstrates that Christ is the true Messiah who fulfilled the prophecies, in the second part he confutes fifteen objections made by two rabbis, demonstrating however a knowledge of the Hebrew language and of the Hebrew Bible. This work's fiercely antisemitic tone influenced other antisemitic writers such as Fino Fini.
