= Paolo Bisanti =

- Bishop of Kotor
- Church: Catholic Church
- See: Bishop of Kotor
- Appointed: 15 October 1565
- Term ended: 1578
- Predecessor: Luca Bisanti
- Successor: Franjo Župan
- Other post: General Vicar of Patriarchate of Aquileia

Personal details
- Born: 1529 Kotor, Venetian Republic
- Died: 4 March 1587 (aged 57–58) Udine, Venetian Republic

Paolo Bisanti (Italian: Paolo Bisanti, Croatian: Pavao Bizanti, Slovene: Pavla Bizancija, Latin: Paulus Byzantius, 1529–1587) was Bishop of Kotor and later Vicar of the Patriarchate of Aquileia where he played an important role in the Catholic reform.

== Life ==
Paolo Bisanti was born in Kotor in 1529 to a local noble family: his uncle Trifone had been bishop of that town till 1540. Luca, Paolo's older brother, became bishop of Kotor after the uncle, and, as usual among the poor bishops, Luca entered in service to the Grimani family and served as Vicar of the Patriarchate of Aquileia between 1547 and 1556.

Paolo graduated in utroque iure in Padua, and when back in Kotor he was encharged of local politic duties. His brother Luca resigned the bishopric in his favour, and Paolo was so appointed Bishop of Kotor on 12 October 1565. He was examined by the Archbishop of Dubrovnik Crisostomo Calvino and confirmed in the appointment.

In 1578 he resigned the bishopric and was appointed by Vicar of the Patriarchate of Aquileia. The Patriarch of Aquileia used to live in Venice, while Paolo lived in Udine having the full responsibility of the local government. The Patriarchate of Aquileia covered not only regions in the Venetian Republic but other territories under the Habsburg Empire, which was the cause of strong clashes with the House of Habsburg. However, thanks to his diplomatic skills, in 1581 he succeeded in entering Carniola, Styria and Carinthia, and in 1583 Burgenland and Gorizia (part of the Patriarchate of Aquileia) to perform his pastoral visit as requested by the Council of Trent.

The Patriarchate of Aquileia bordered territories with a Protestant presence, so Paolo Bisanti was particularly active in implementing the measures of the Council of Trent, and in reforming the clergy. According to J. Gruden, his 1581 pastoral visit marked the beginning of the Catholic resistance against the onslaught of Protestantism in Slovenia.

He was author of several Latin treatises in the field of ecclesiastical law. In 1584 he summoned a synod in Udine. After the appointment of Francesco Barbaro as coadjutor of the Patriarch, the office of Bisanti lost importance. He died in Udine on 4 March 1587.
