= Tryphon, Respicius, and Nympha =

3rd-century Christian saint

Saint Tryphon
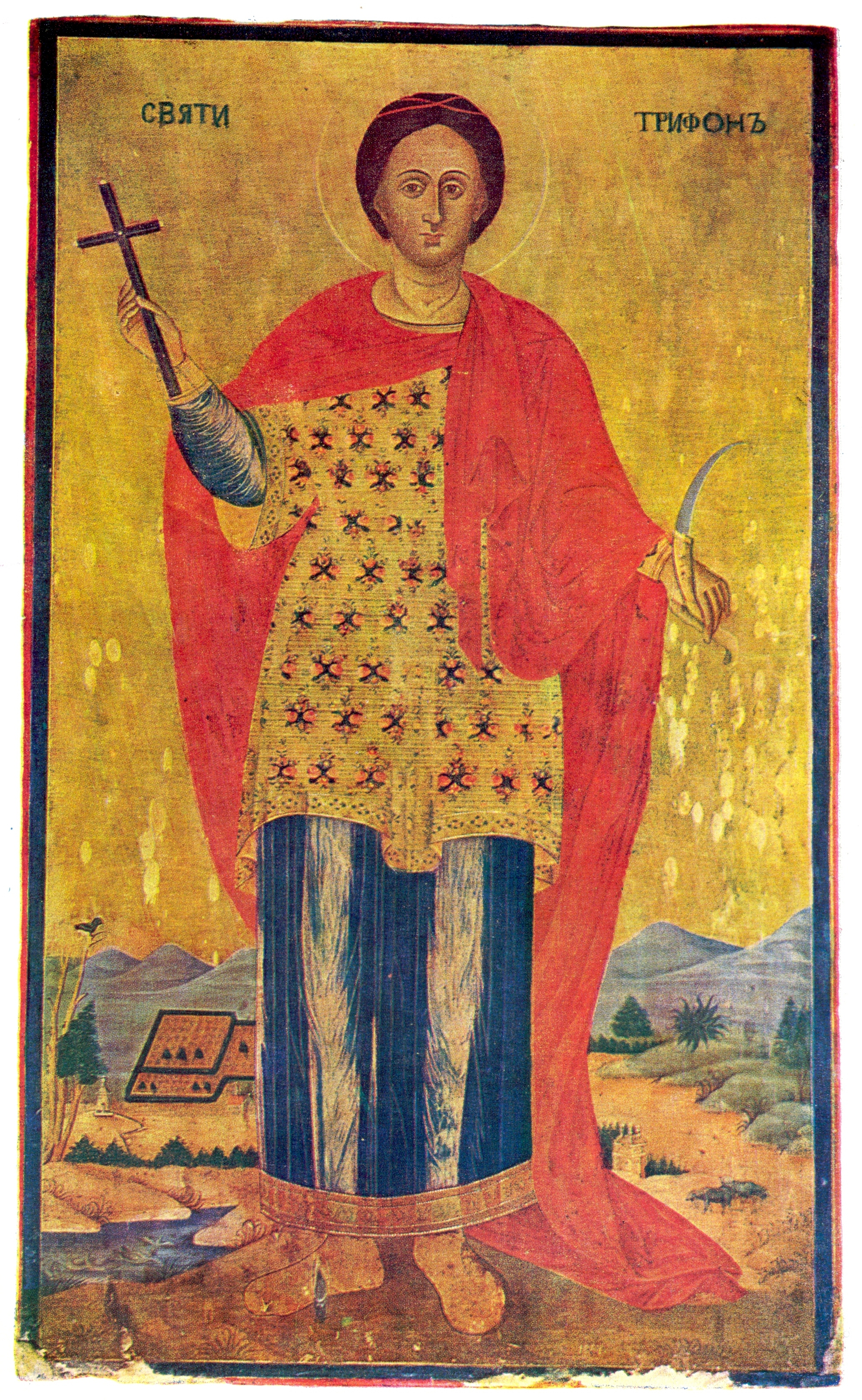
- Russian Orthodox icon of St. Tryphon of Campsada.

Great martyr, Holy unmercenary
- Born: Campsada, Phrygia (now Turkey)
- Died: 250 AD; Nicaea (modern-day Iznik, Bursa, Turkey)
- Venerated in: Roman Catholic Church; Eastern Orthodox Church
- Major shrine: Cathedral of Saint Tryphon in Kotor
- Feast: 1 February [O.S. 14 February] in Roman Catholic and Eastern Orthodox calendars 10 November (formerly in the Roman Catholic Church);
- Attributes: falcon
- Patronage: gardeners and winegrowers; Kotor, Montenegro; Moscow, Russia; invoked against rodents and locusts

Saint Tryphon of Campsada (Greek: Τρύφων : Trúphōn; also spelled Trypho, Trifon, Triphon) was a 3rd-century Christian saint. He is venerated by the Roman Catholic and Eastern Orthodox churches as a great martyr and holy unmercenary.

Saint Tryphon was formerly celebrated jointly with Saints Respicius and Nympha on 10 November in the liturgical calendar of the Latin Church from the eleventh century until the twentieth, and remains on the liturgical calendar of the extraordinary form of the Roman rite. Saint Tryphon continues to be celebrated (separately) on 1 February [O.S. 14 February] on both the Orthodox liturgical calendar and the Roman Calendar of Saints.

== Life ==
Saint Tryphon was born at Campsada in Phrygia (now Turkey), and as a boy took care of geese. His name is derived from the Greek τρυφή (tryphe) meaning "softness, delicacy". He acquired fame as a healer, especially of animals, and is considered one of the Holy Unmercenaries, particularly invoked on farms.

During the Decian persecution he was taken to Nicaea about the year 250 and was tortured in a horrible manner. He was beheaded with a sword after he had converted the heathen prefect Licius. Fabulous stories are interwoven with his hagiography.

== Veneration ==
His feast day is on 1 February [O.S. 14 February] in both the Eastern Orthodox Church and (now) in the Roman Catholic Church.

He is greatly venerated in the Eastern Orthodox Church, in which he is also the patron saint of gardeners and winegrowers. In Serbia, North Macedonia and Bulgaria, St Tryphon is celebrated by vine growers. The celebrations are a fertility rite intended to encourage the growth of the vines, and it is also thought that human infertility can be cured on this day. Many Greeks continue this celebration and have special customs every year.

In Russia, Tryphon is venerated as a patron of birds. In Russian icons of the saint, he is often shown holding a falcon, a reference to a miracle attributed to his intercessions. Prayers attributed to him are used against infestations of rodents and locusts. One such prayer appears in the Great Euchologion. Saint Trifon is often depicted with a merlin on hand as he was traditionally venerated by Moscow hunters.

Many churches were dedicated to him. The Eastern Emperor, Leo VI the Wise (d. 912), delivered a eulogy in Tryphon's honour. He is the protector saint of the town of Kotor in Montenegro and one of the patron saints of Moscow. The Cathedral of Saint Tryphon in Kotor is dedicated to him.

=== Relics ===
His relics were first buried in his native Kampsada. Later, they were translated to Constantinople and then to Rome. His head is kept in the Kotor Cathedral. A portion of his relics are enthroned in the Holy Altar of Saint Anthony’s Greek Orthodox Church in Springfield IL

== Respicius and Nympha ==
In the Latin Church, 10 November was formerly a feast day associated with Saint Tryphon and two other saints, of whom little is known: Respicius and Nympha. While Saint Trypho is still listed in the Roman Martyrology, Respicius and Nympha have been omitted.

In about 1005, the monk Theodoric of Fleury wrote, on the basis of earlier written legends, an account of Tryphon in which Respicius appears as his companion. The relics of both were preserved, together with those of a holy virgin named Nympha, at the Hospital of the Holy Ghost in Sassia. The church of this hospital was a cardinal's title, which, together with the relics of these saints, was transferred by Pope Pius V to the Church of St. Augustine in 1566.

One tradition held that Nympha (Ninfa) was a virgin martyr from Palermo who was put to death for the faith at the beginning of the fourth century. According to other versions of the legend, when the Vandals invaded Sicily, she fled from Palermo to the Italian mainland and died in the sixth century at Savona. The feast of her translation is observed at Palermo on 19 August. Some believe that there were two saints of this name. Before 1624 Palermo had four patron saints, one for each of the four major parts of the city. They were Saint Agatha, Saint Christina, Saint Nympha, and Saint Olivia. Their images are displayed at the Quattro Canti, in the centre of Palermo.
