= Giuseppe Pamphilj (bishop of Kotor) =

Montenegrin prelate

Most Reverend Giuseppe Pamphilj
- Bishop of Kotor
- Church: Catholic Church
- Diocese: Diocese of Kotor
- In office: 1620–1622
- Predecessor: Girolamo Rusca
- Successor: Vincenzo Bucchi

Personal details
- Born: 1580
- Died: 1622 (age 42) Kotor, Montenegro

Giuseppe Pamphilj or Giacomo Pamphilj (1580–1622) was a Roman Catholic prelate who served as Bishop of Kotor (1620–1622).

== Biography ==
Giuseppe Pamphilj was born in 1580. On 15 Jun 1620, he was appointed during the papacy of Pope Paul V as Bishop of Kotor. He served as Bishop of Kotor until his death in 1622.

Catholic Church titles
Preceded by Girolamo Rusca	Bishop of Kotor; 1620–1622	Succeeded by Vincenzo Bucchi
