= Donji Jasenjani =

- Village
- Location within Bosnia and Herzegovina
- Coordinates: 43.5429624°N 17.6912482°E
- Country: Bosnia and Herzegovina
- Entity: Federation of Bosnia and Herzegovina
- Canton: Herzegovina-Neretva
- Municipality: City of Mostar

Area
  - Total: 7.20 sq mi (18.65 km^{2})

Population (2013)
  - Total: 10
  - Density: 1.4/sq mi (0.54/km^{2})
- Time zone: UTC+1 (CET)
  - Summer (DST): UTC+2 (CEST)

Donji Jasenjani is a village in the City of Mostar, Bosnia and Herzegovina.

== Demographics ==
According to the 2013 census, its population was 10.

Ethnicity in 2013
Ethnicity	Number	Percentage
Bosniaks	8	80.0%
Croats	2	20.0%
Total	10	100%
