= Kazimir Forlani =

Croatian prelate

Kazimir Forlani (Italian: Casimiro Forlani; 2 March 1834 – 3 August 1887) was a Croatian prelate of the Catholic Church who served as bishop of Kotor from 1879 until his death in 1887. He also served as auxiliary bishop of Split-Makarska from 1872 until 1880.

== Biography ==
Forlani was born in Drniš in Dalmatia, Austrian Empire. He attended elementary school, gymnasium and theological studies in Zadar. Forlani studied theology at Augustineum in Vienna, where he earned his Ph.D. in theology in 1859. There, he was ordained a deacon on 1 December 1856, and a priest on 8 March 1857.

In 1857, he started to lecture at the Catholic Faculty of Theology, University of Zadar, where he taught the Old Testament and Oriental languages from 1862 until 1866f and church history and canon law from 1866 until 1873.

In 1872, he started publishing a magazine in Italian called La Dalmazia cattolica (the Catholic Dalmatia), of which he was a publisher and editor-in-chief. However, already in the second issue, some articles were written in Croatian. Since September 1878, the magazine had bilingual title La Dalmazia cattolica - Katolička Dalmacija. The magazine had a religious-political profile and became the most significant Catholic voice in Dalmatia.

On 6 May 1872 Pope Pius IX appointed him Auxiliary Bishop of Split-Makarska and a Titular Bishop of Comana in present-day Turkey. He was consecrated on 17 November 1872 in Split by Bishop Marko Kalogjera.

As a papal visitor, he officially visited the Franciscan parishes and monasteries in Herzegovina between 1878 and 1879, after which he went to Vienna and Rome, to inform the Austrian-Hungarian government and the Pope about his findings. While in Rome, he was appointed Bishop of Kotor on 12 May 1879. To make up for the lack of priests in the diocese, he initiated the opening of a seminary for priestly education. Forlani was first to preach in Croatian in Kotor.

He died in Donja Lastva near Tivat.
