= Antonio Bernardo (humanist) =

Antonio Bernardo (c. 1430 – 1504×1512) was a Venetian professor of civil law, humanist and official. He is notorious for having expelled the Jews from Vicenza during his term as governor and for his antisemitic rants as president of the Council of Ten.

== Life ==
Bernardo was born around 1430, the son of Andrea di Francesco Bernardo and Nicoletta, daughter of Andrea di Marco Dandolo. His parents were married in 1418 and his father was ambassador to the Republic of Florence in 1433. His brothers were Giovanni, Zaccaria, Lorenzo, Dandolo and Girolamo. Lorenzo served at one point as podestà of Chioggia.

Bernardo studied at the University of Padua and earned a doctorate. He was first elected to public office in 1454, when he served as advocatus proprii. In 1462, he was appointed extraordinary professor of civil law at Padua with a salary of 30 ducats a year. That same year, he married Elena, daughter of Carlo Quirini. They had four sons—Marcantonio, Paolo, Carlo, Ludovico and Andrea—two of whom were presented for the balla d'oro in 1487 and 1490.

Around the time he was named professor, Bernardo was named to a panel of three judges to resolve a property dispute between the abbey of Santa Maria delle Carceri and the communes of Vighizzolo and Gazzo. On 30 November 1463, he was elected podestà of Padua. For his service to the Republic in Padua, he was made a Knight of Saint Mark.

The 18th-century historian Pietro Gradenigo records that Bernardo was the ambassador to the Duchy of Burgundy in 1470. This is not recorded anywhere else and it is likely that Gradenigo has confused Antonio Bernardo with Antonio Dandolo, who was the envoy to Burgundy in 1468–1469.

In 1471, Bernardo was one of the electors of the Doge Nicolò Tron. From 1484 to 1486, he was podestà of Vicenza. In 1486, influenced by the anti-Jewish campaign of Pietro Bruto, he expelled the Jews from the city. There is an inscription celebrating him for this and for founding the local mount of piety. In 1486–1487, he was ambassador in Dalmatia, in which post he was succeeded by Domenico Bollani. In 1489, he was the podestà and captain of Treviso. In 1492, he helped Bernardino da Feltre expel a Jewish moneylender from Padua and establish a Christian-owned bank there. In September 1497, he attended the funeral of the Milanese ambassador in Venice. In 1497–1498, he was captain of Bergamo. He was a member of the Council of Ten in 1495–1496 and again from 1498 to 1502. In 1499–1500, he served for some months as head of the council, in which capacity Marino Sanudo records him ranting against the Jews in September 1500.

In 1502, Elena died and Bernardo had a memorial stone erected for her in the Sanctuary of the Vision in Camposampiero. In September, Bernardo was among those elected to examine the legacy of the late doge Agostino Barbarigo. In November 1503, he was a candidate to be the ambassador to Pope Julius II, but was not elected. The last mention of him in surviving records is as a candidate for Procurator of Saint Mark on 5 May 1504. By 23 June 1512, he was dead.

== Works ==
There are records of two surviving speeches attributed to Bernardo, the Oratio in doctoratu Albertini Baduarii and Oratio pro doctoratu Jacobi Molini in gymnasio patavino, delivered at the graduations of Albertino Badoer and Jacopo Molin at Padua. Molin's degree was probably granted in 1457 or 1458. In his speech, Bernardo also praises the learning of Molin's younger brother, Pietro Molin, then an arts student.

Bernardo is reputed to have written a lost commentary on the first part of the Digest. The funeral oration for Doge Cristoforo Moro has also been attributed to him.

His fame was such that, according to Francesco Sansovino, his portrait was hung in the hall of the Great Council of Venice. Bartolomeo Pagello addressed an elegy to him and he was one of the dedicatees of Alessandro Benedetti's Diaria de bello carolino.

== Bibliography ==
- Beverley, Tessa (1999). Venetian Ambassadors, 1454–94: An Italian Elite (PDF) (PhD dissertation). University of Warwick.
- Bowd, Stephen (2016). "Civic Piety and Patriotism: Patrician Humanists and Jews in Venice and Its Empire". Renaissance Quarterly. 69 (4): 1257–1295. JSTOR 26560059.
- Caravale, Mario (1967). "Bernardo, Antonio". Dizionario Biografico degli Italiani, Volume 9: Berengario–Biagini (in Italian). Rome: Istituto dell'Enciclopedia Italiana. pp. 304–305. ISBN 978-8-81200032-6.
- King, Margaret L. (1985). Venetian Humanism in an Age of Patrician Dominance. Princeton University Press.
