= Topla Reber =

- Location in Slovenia
- Coordinates: 45°45′7.23″N 14°57′42.06″E
- Country: Slovenia
- Traditional region: Lower Carniola
- Statistical region: Southeast Slovenia
- Municipality: Kočevje

Area
  - Total: 3.46 km^{2} (1.34 sq mi)

Population (2002)
  - Total: 0

Topla Reber (pronounced [ˈtɔːpla ˈɾeːbəɾ]) is a settlement in the Municipality of Kočevje in southern Slovenia. It incorporates both the former settlements of Dolnja Topla Reber (German: Unterwarmberg) and Gornja Topla Reber (Oberwarmberg). It no longer has any permanent residents.

== Name ==
The name Topla Reber literally means 'warm slope', referring to the geographical position of the settlement on a sun-exposed southwest-facing slope.
