= Rrok Gjonlleshaj =

Montenegrin-Albanian archbishop

- Archbishop of Bar
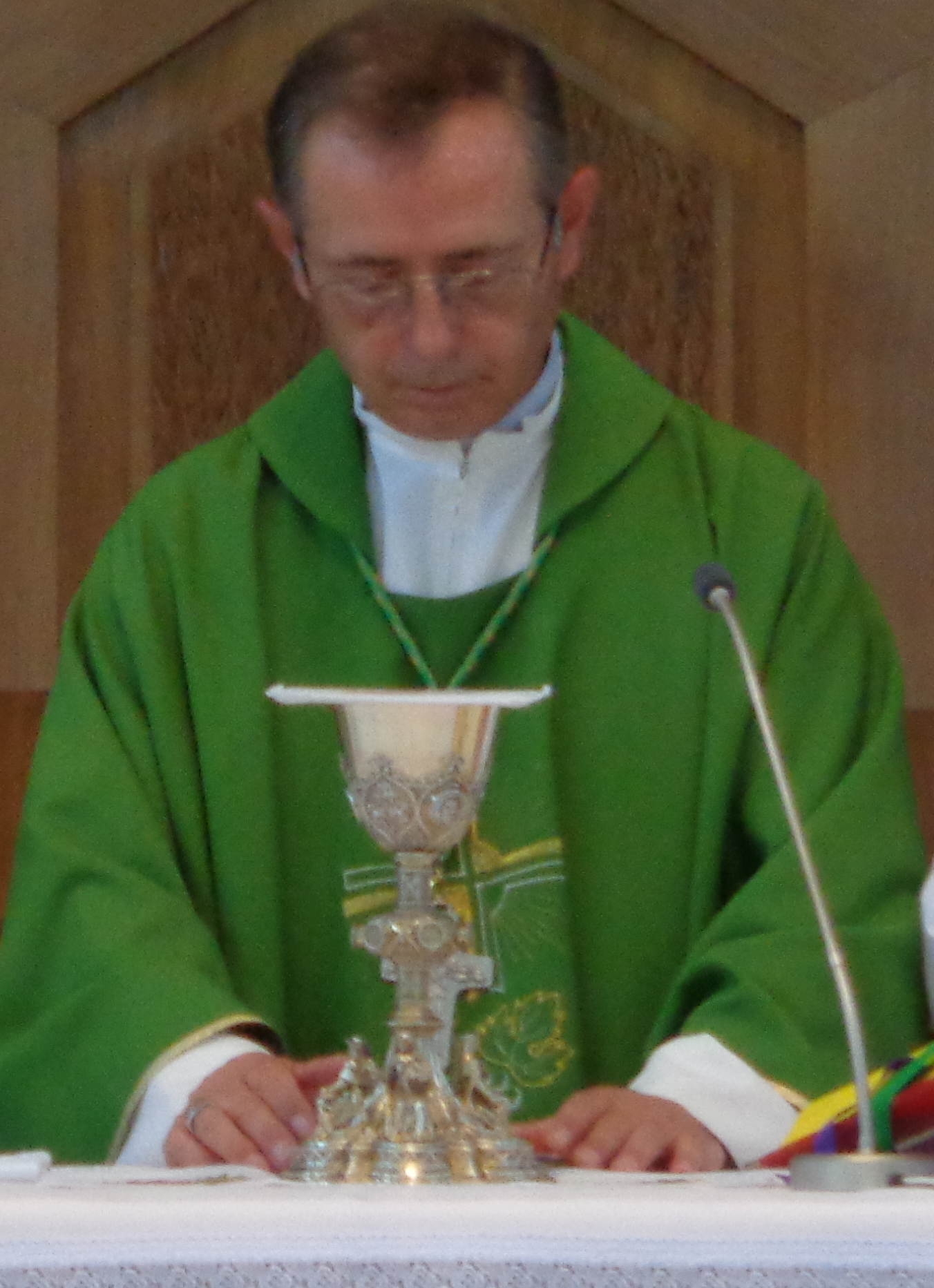
- Gjonlleshaj in July 2021
- Church: Catholic Church
- Archdiocese: Archdiocese of Bar
- Appointed: 5 April 2016
- Predecessor: Zef Gashi
- Previous post: Apostolic Administrator of Kotor (2019-2021, 2023-2024)

Orders
- Ordination: 1 August 1987
- Consecration: 14 May 2016 by Zef Gashi

Personal details
- Born: 10 February 1961 (age 65) Velezhë, SAR Kosovo, PR Serbia, FPR Yugoslavia

Rrok Gjonlleshaj (Montenegrin: Рок Ђонлешај, Rok Đonlešaj; born 10 February 1961) is a Montenegrin Albanian prelate of the Catholic Church who serves as the Archbishop of Bar from 2016. He served as the apostolic administrator of Kotor from 2023 to 2024, a post he also held from 2019 to 2021.

He is also the president of Caritas Montenegro.

== Life ==
After the end of his elementary studies in Velezhë (Prizren Municipality), Rrok Gjonlleshaj studied philosophy and theology in Rijeka and received on 1 August 1987, the sacrament of Holy Orders for the Apostolic Administration of Prizren. He then worked in several parishes as a vicar and after as a pastor, most of them in Pristina. Gjonlleshaj was parish priest of the St. Anthony parish in Pristina as well as treasurer of the Apostolic Administration of Prizren. He was also the director of Radio Marija in Albanian and a contributor to the Drita religious-cultural show. On 5 April 2016 he was appointed by Pope Francis as Archbishop of Bar. His episcopal ordination was performed by his predecessor Zef Gashi, SDB on 14 May of the same year and the co-consecrators were the Apostolic Nuncio in Slovenia, Archbishop Juliusz Janusz, and the Apostolic Administrator of Prizren, Dodë Gjergji.
