= Kotor Cathedral =

Coordinates: 42.4241°N 18.7719°E

Cathedral of Saint Tryphon
- Roman Catholic Cathedral of Saint Tryphon
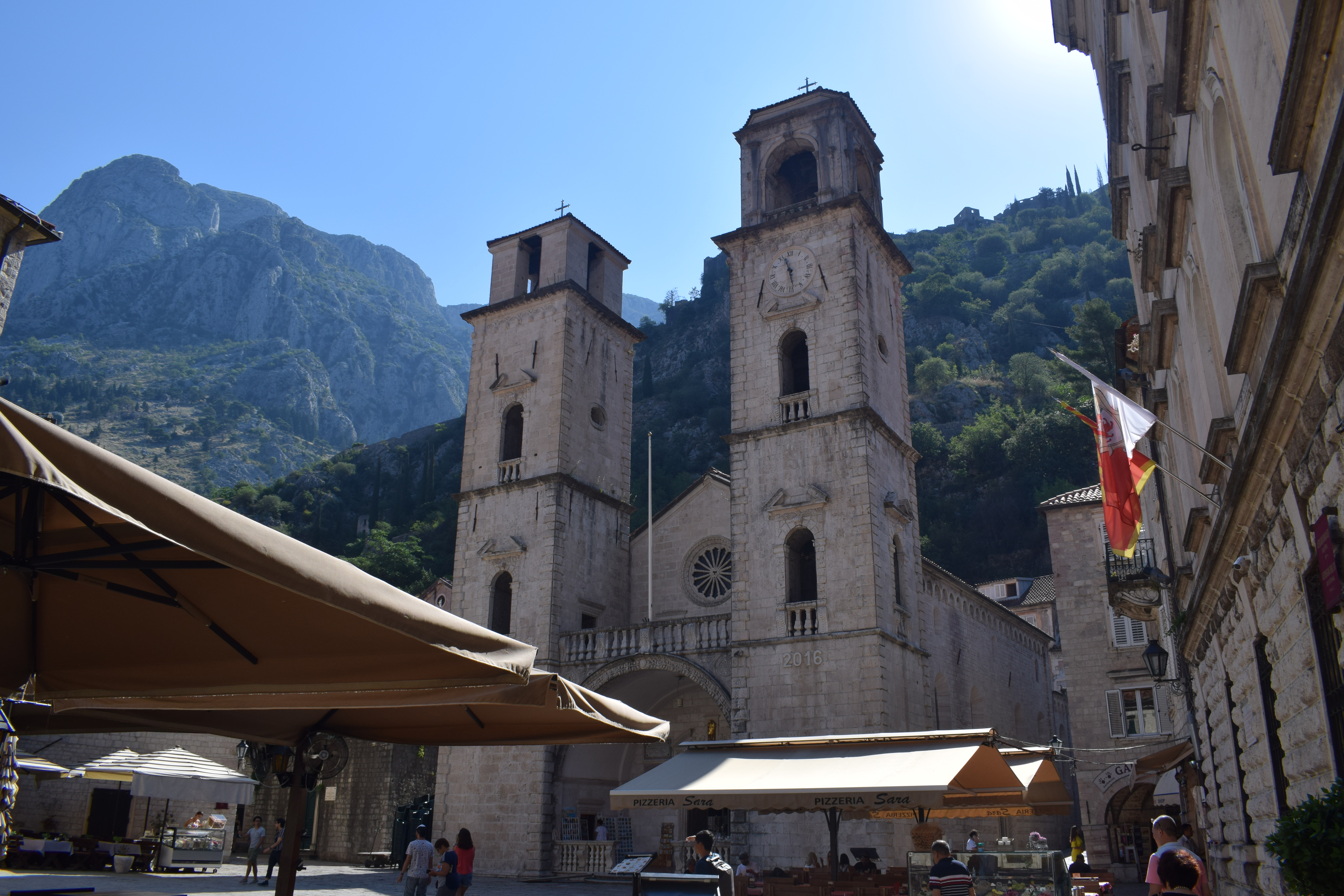
- Saint Tryphon cathedral in 2018.
- Cathedral of Saint Tryphon
- Country: Montenegro
- Denomination: Roman Catholic
- Website: Kotorska biskupija

Architecture
- Style: Romanesque

The Cathedral of Saint Tryphon (Serbo-Croatian: Katedrala Svetog Tripuna/Катедрала Светог Трипуна) in Kotor, Montenegro, is one of two Roman Catholic cathedrals in Montenegro. It is the seat of the Roman Catholic Diocese of Kotor, which covers the entire Bay of Kotor and Municipality of Budva.

== Location and name ==
It is located in the city of Kotor, one of the best preserved and most beautiful medieval fortified towns in the Mediterranean. It was built in honor of Saint Tryphon (local name Sveti Tripun), the patron and protector of the city, on the same site where an older church had already existed long ago. That earlier church was built in 809 by Andrija (Andreaccio) Saracenis, a citizen of Kotor, where the remains of the saint were kept after being brought from Constantinople (now also known as Istanbul).

== History ==
The cathedral was consecrated on 19 June 1166. Compared to other buildings, the Kotor Cathedral is one of the largest and most ornate buildings in Kotor. The cathedral was seriously damaged and rebuilt after the 1667 Dubrovnik earthquake, but there were not enough funds for its complete reconstruction.

The April 1979 Montenegro earthquake, which completely devastated the Montenegro coast, also greatly damaged the cathedral. It has been salvaged and the careful restoration of parts of its interior has not been completed until a few years ago. On Saturday, December 2, 2000, the Archbishop of Zagreb and President of the Croatian Bishops' Conference, Josip Bozanić, blessed the ancient Kotor Cathedral of Saint Tryphon in Kotor after a 14-year-long renovation of this most valuable sacral medieval monument of Cultural heritage in the Bay of Kotor..

The Romanesque architecture, contains a rich collection of artifacts. Older than many famous churches and cathedrals in Europe, the cathedral has a treasury of immense value. In its interior there are frescoes from the 14th century, a stone ornament above the main altar in which the life of St Tryphon is depicted, as well as a relief of saints in gold and silver.

The collection of art objects includes a silver hand and a cross, decorated with ornaments and figures in relief. It is only a part of the valuable objects of the Treasury of this unique sacral building which was the City Hall in the past. Today, it is the best known tourist attraction in Kotor and a symbol of the city: the Saint is depicted in the city's coat of arms, along with a lion and the Mount of San Giovanni.

== Gallery ==

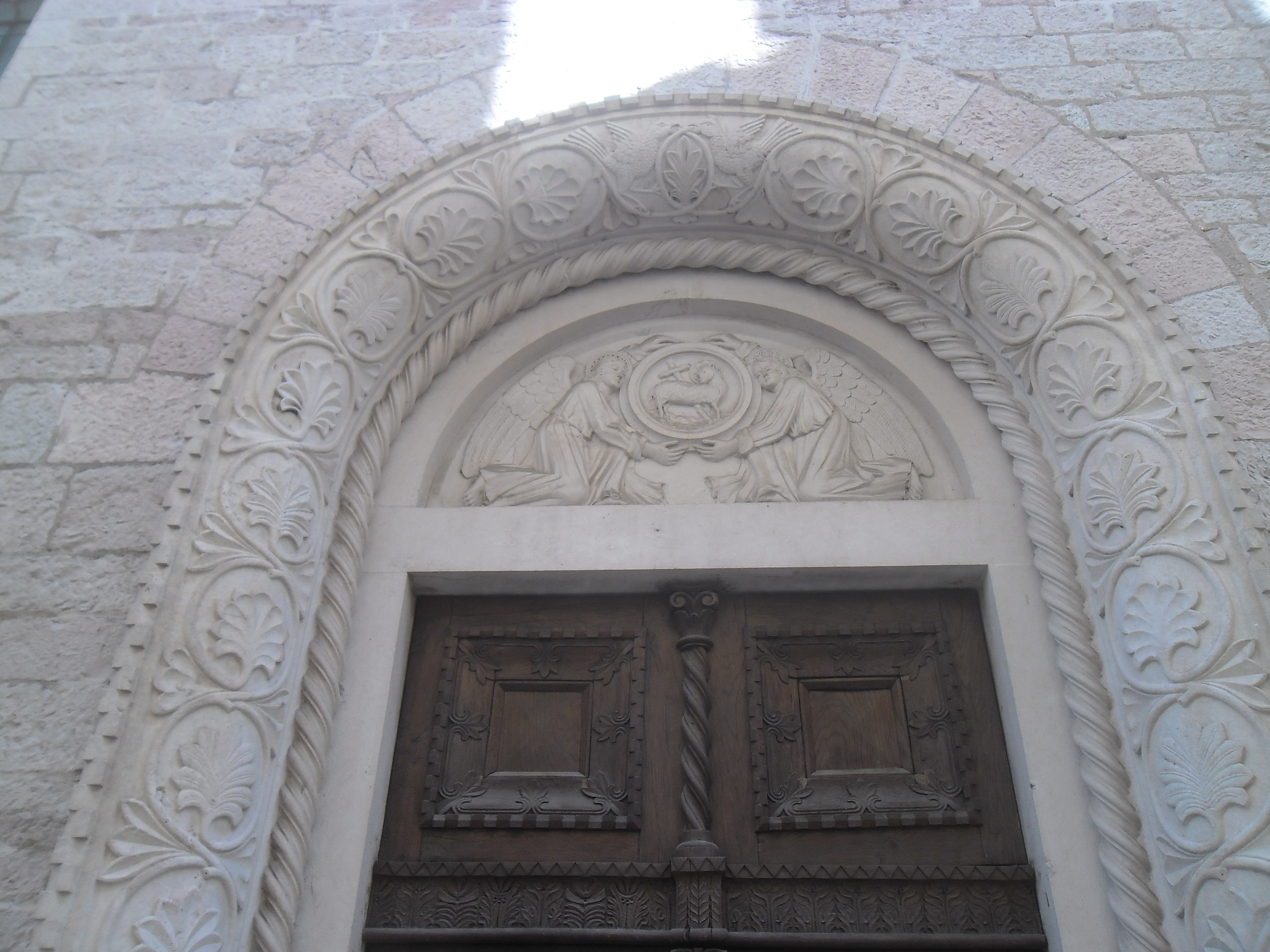

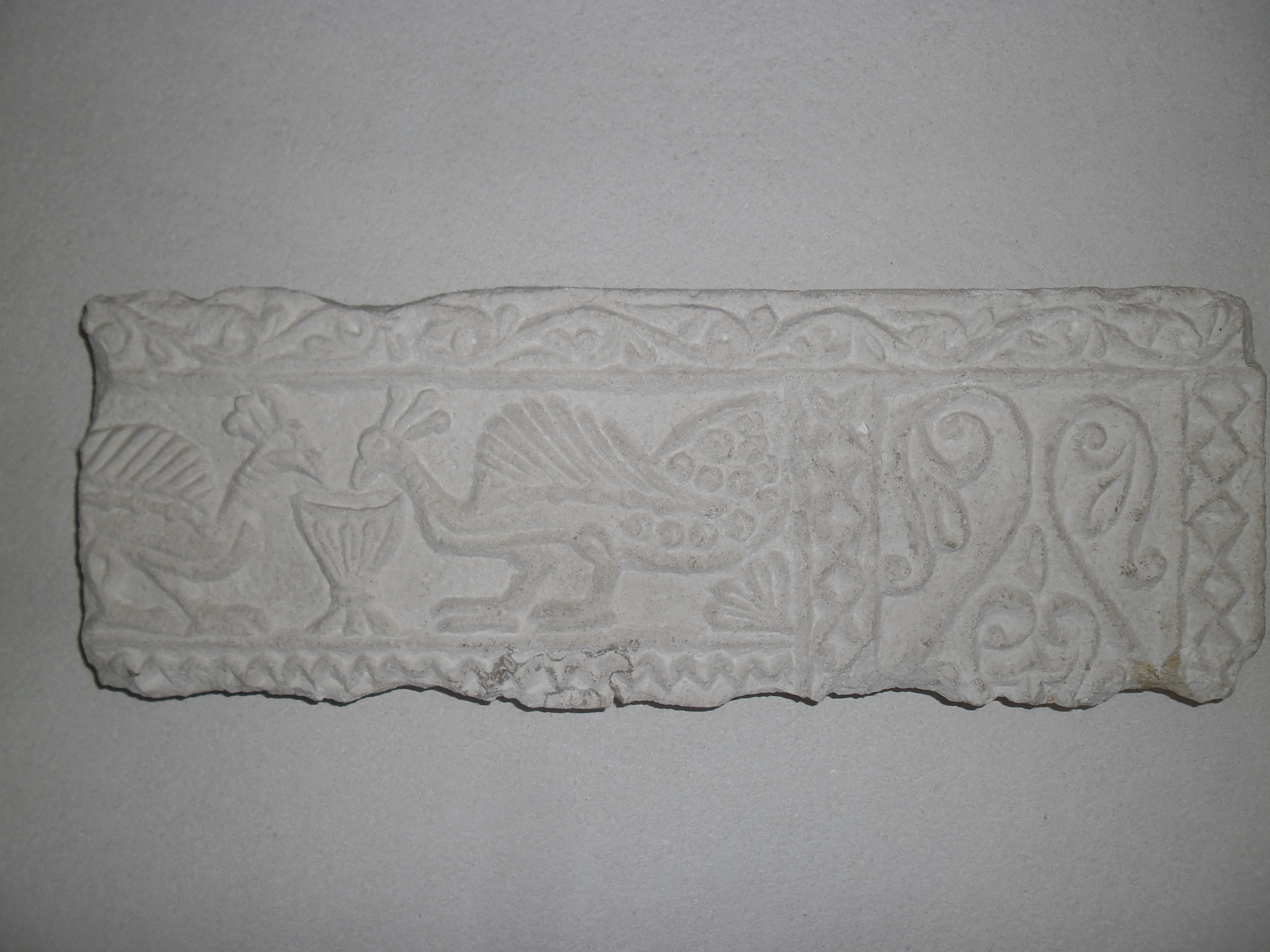

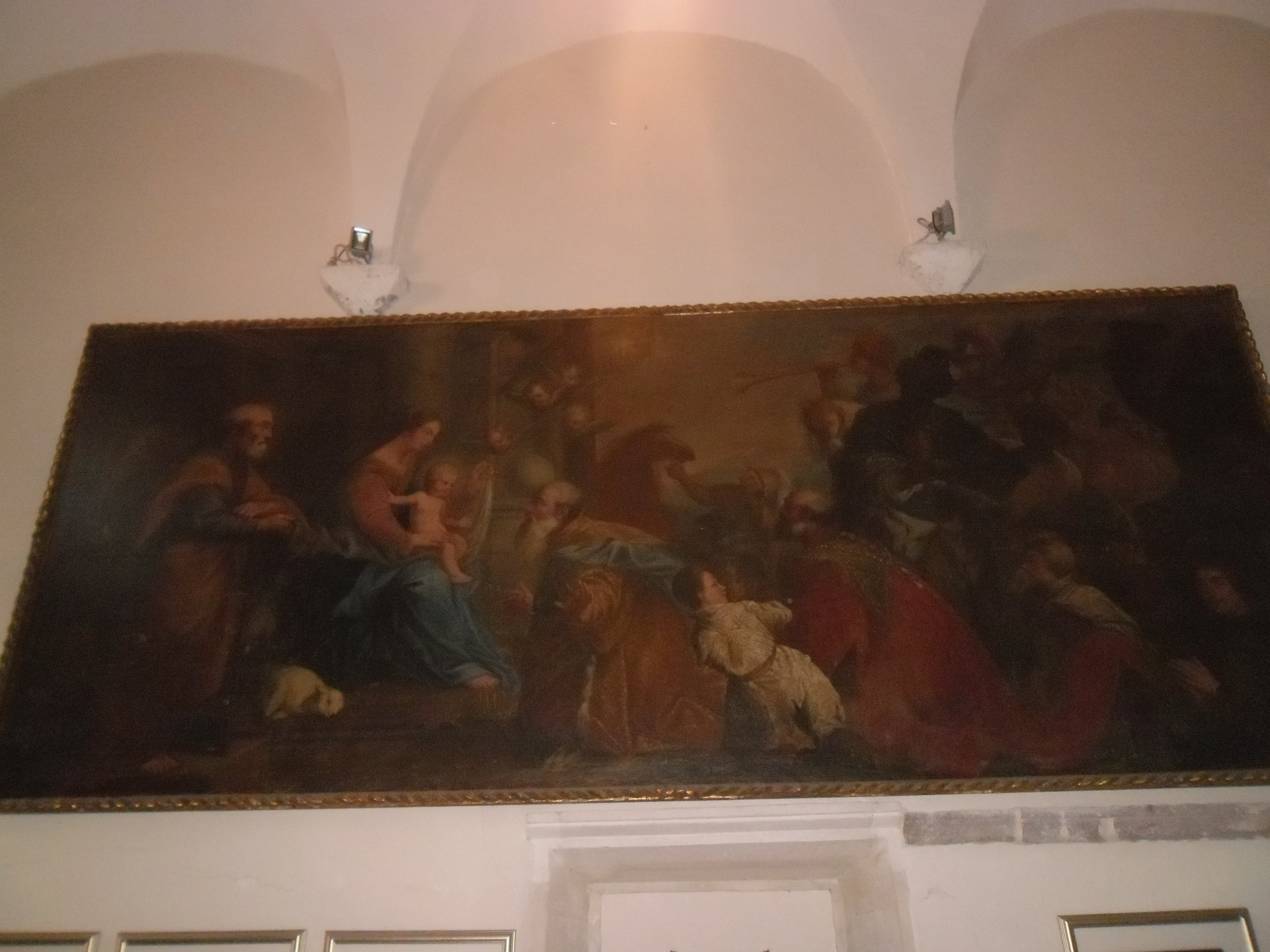

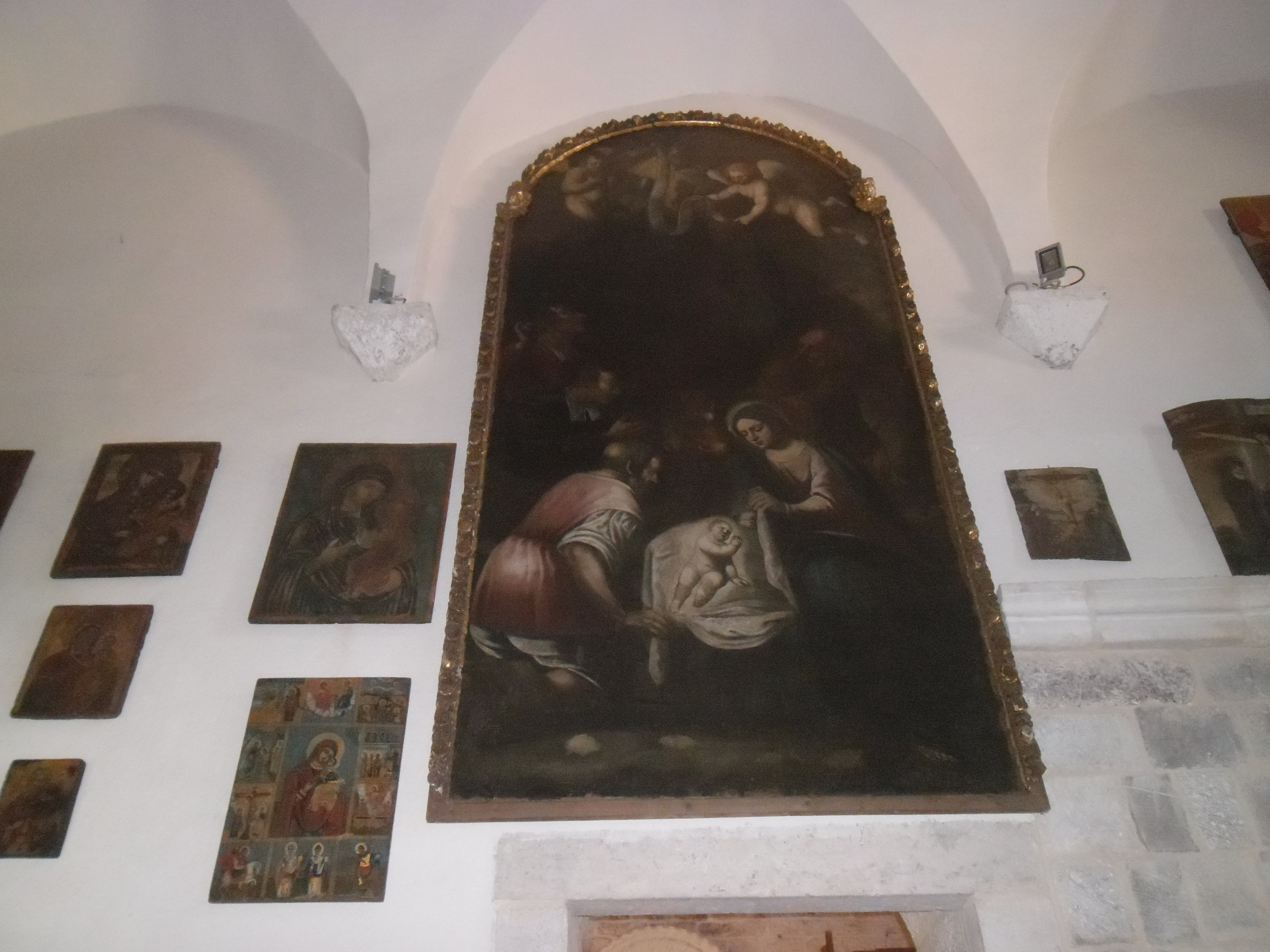

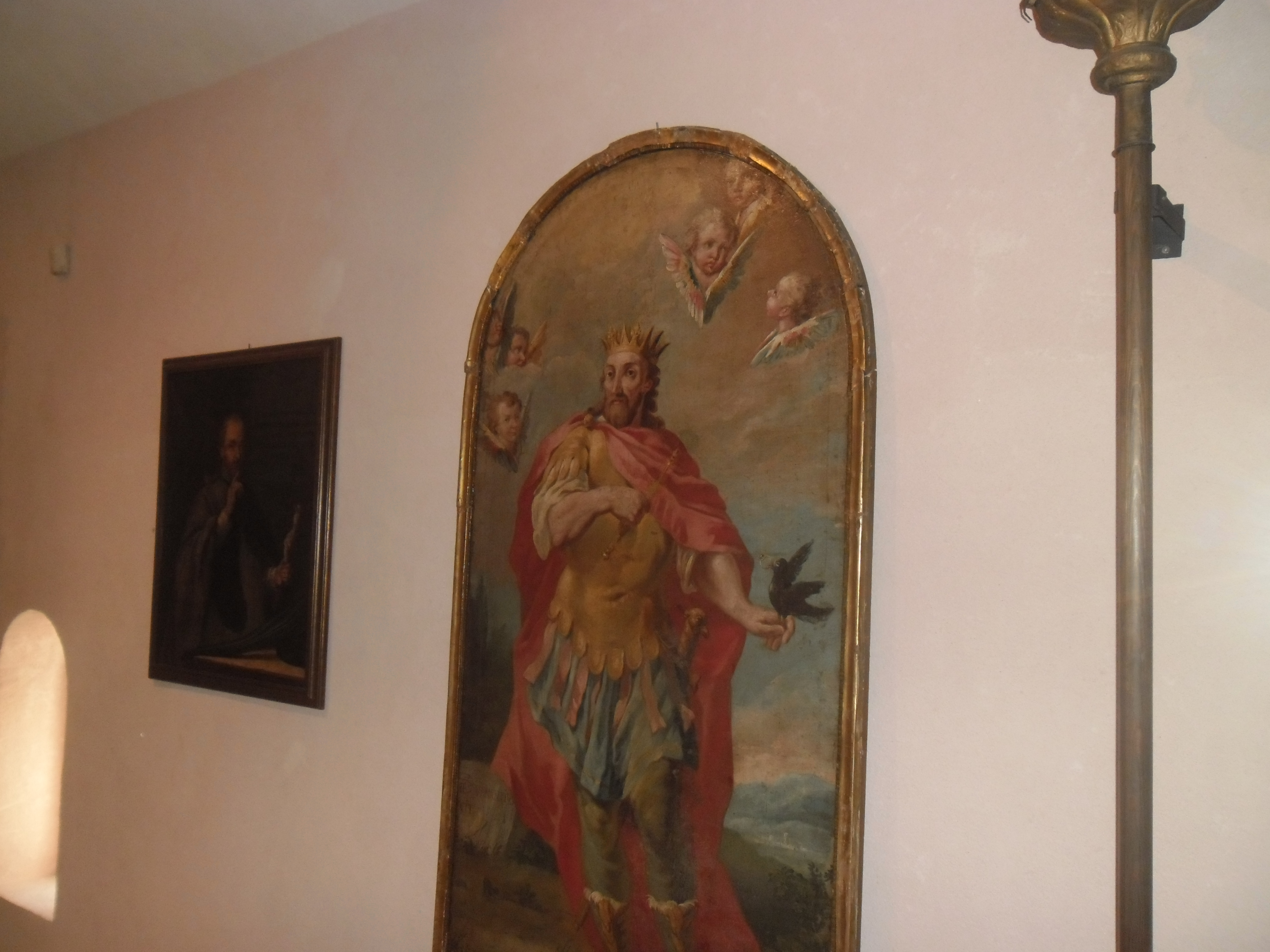

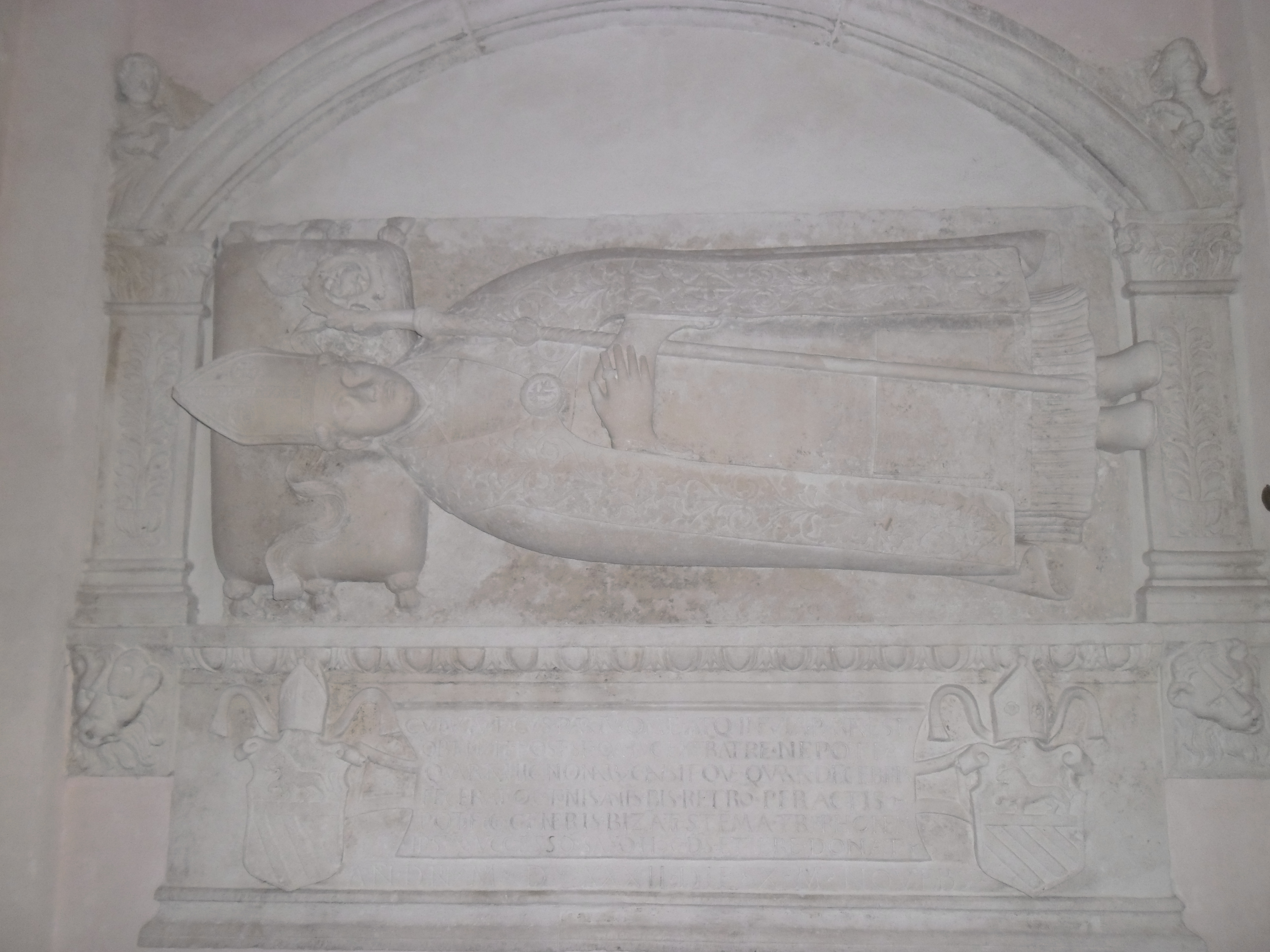

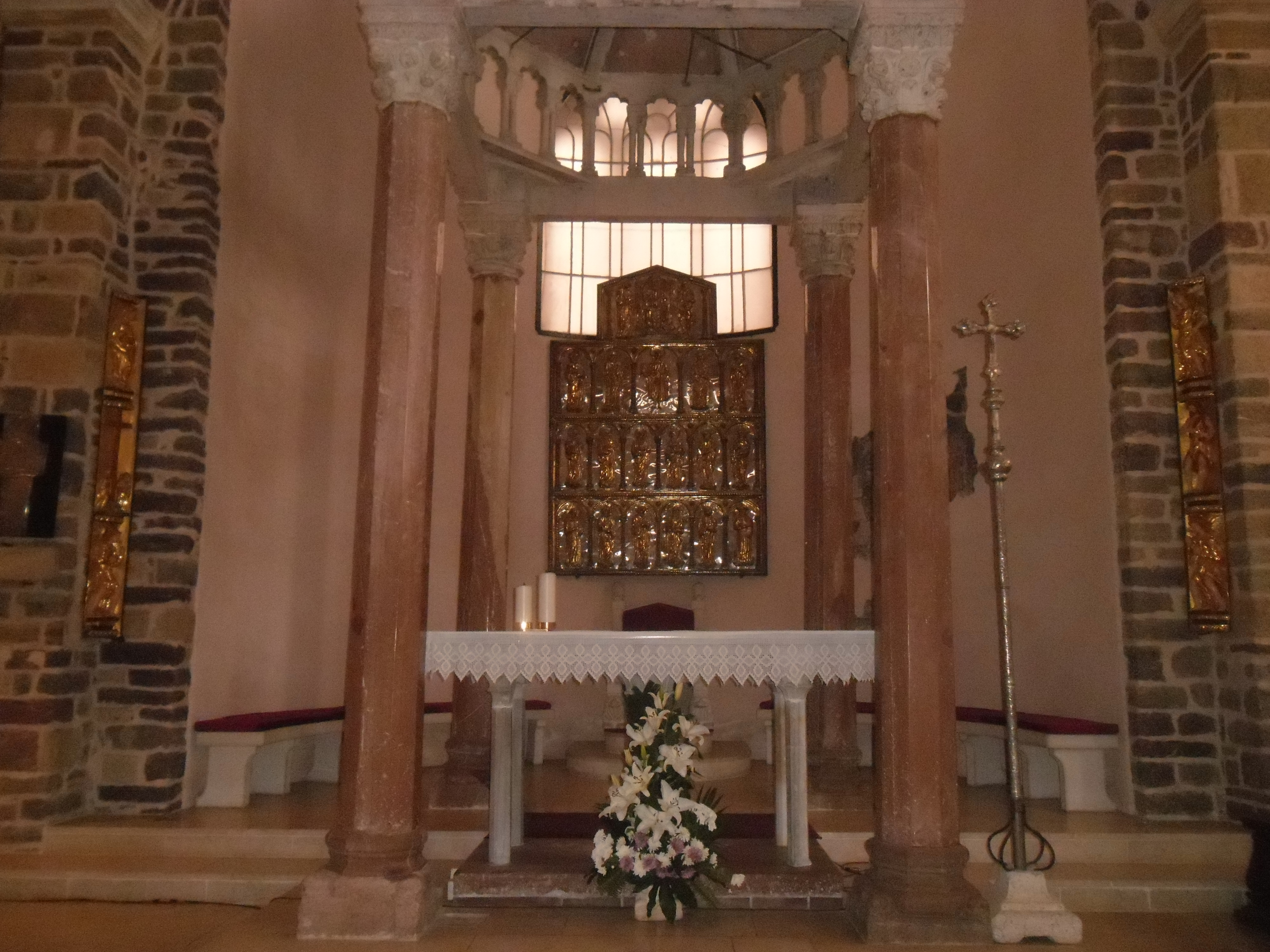

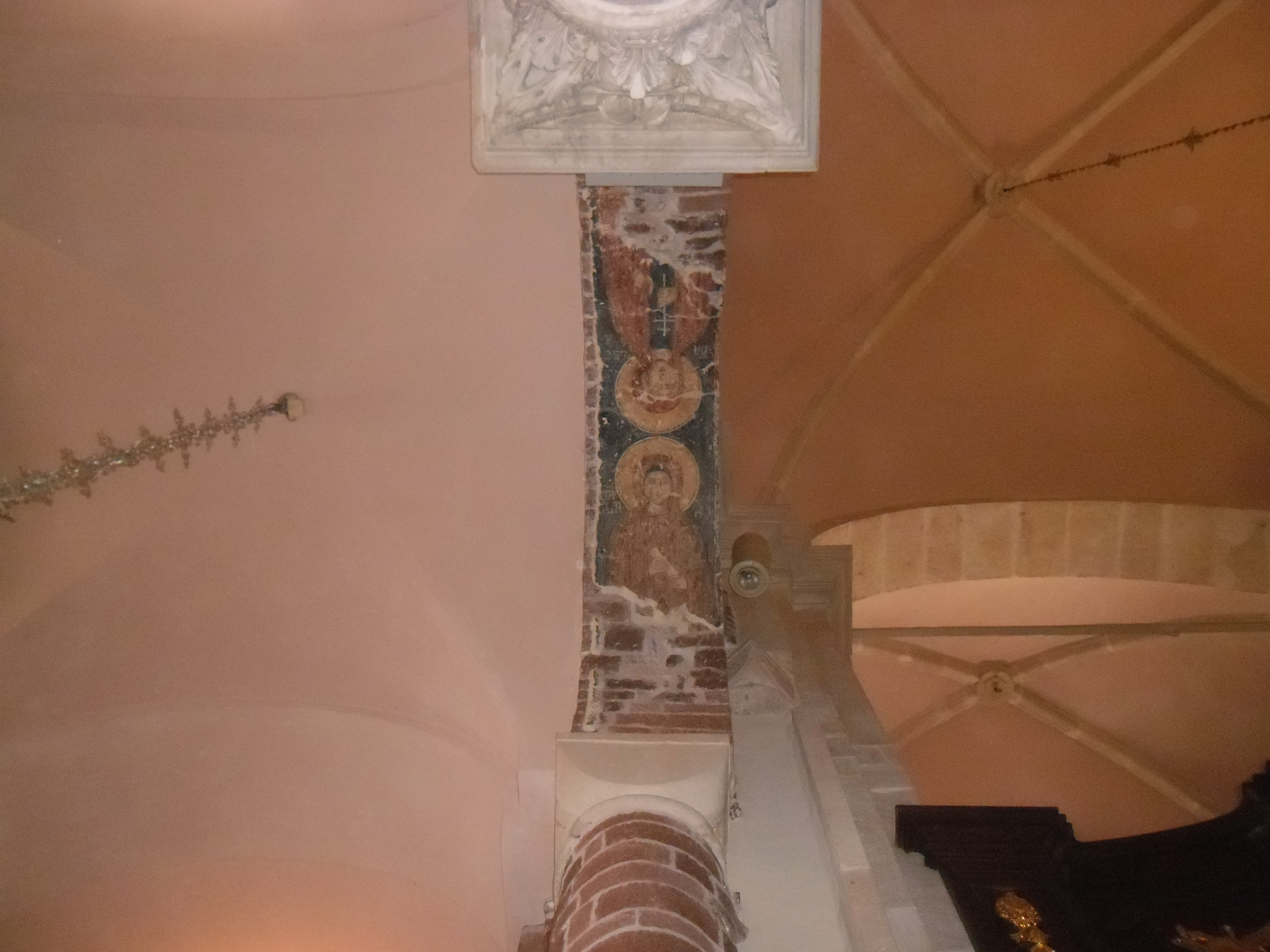

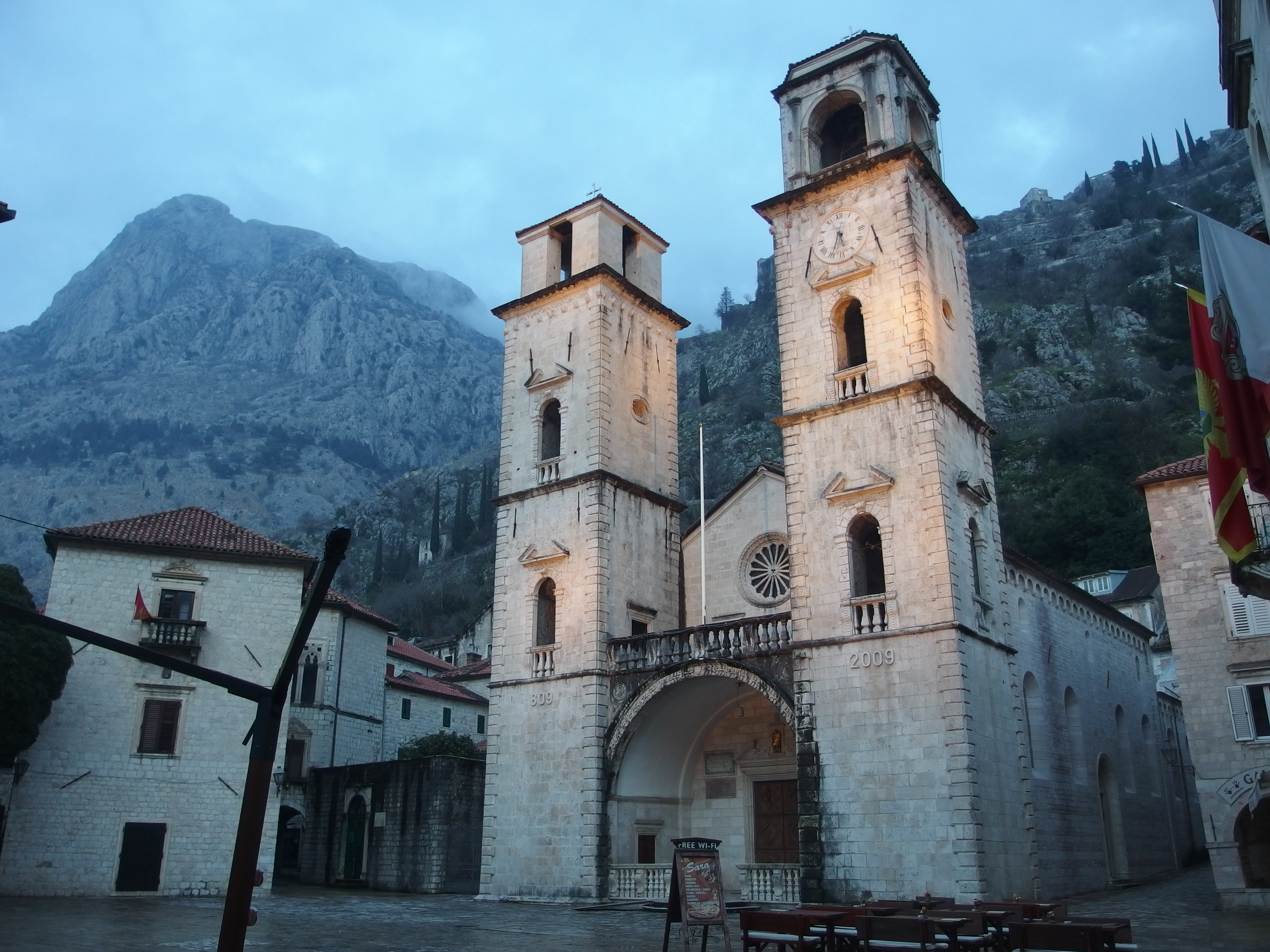

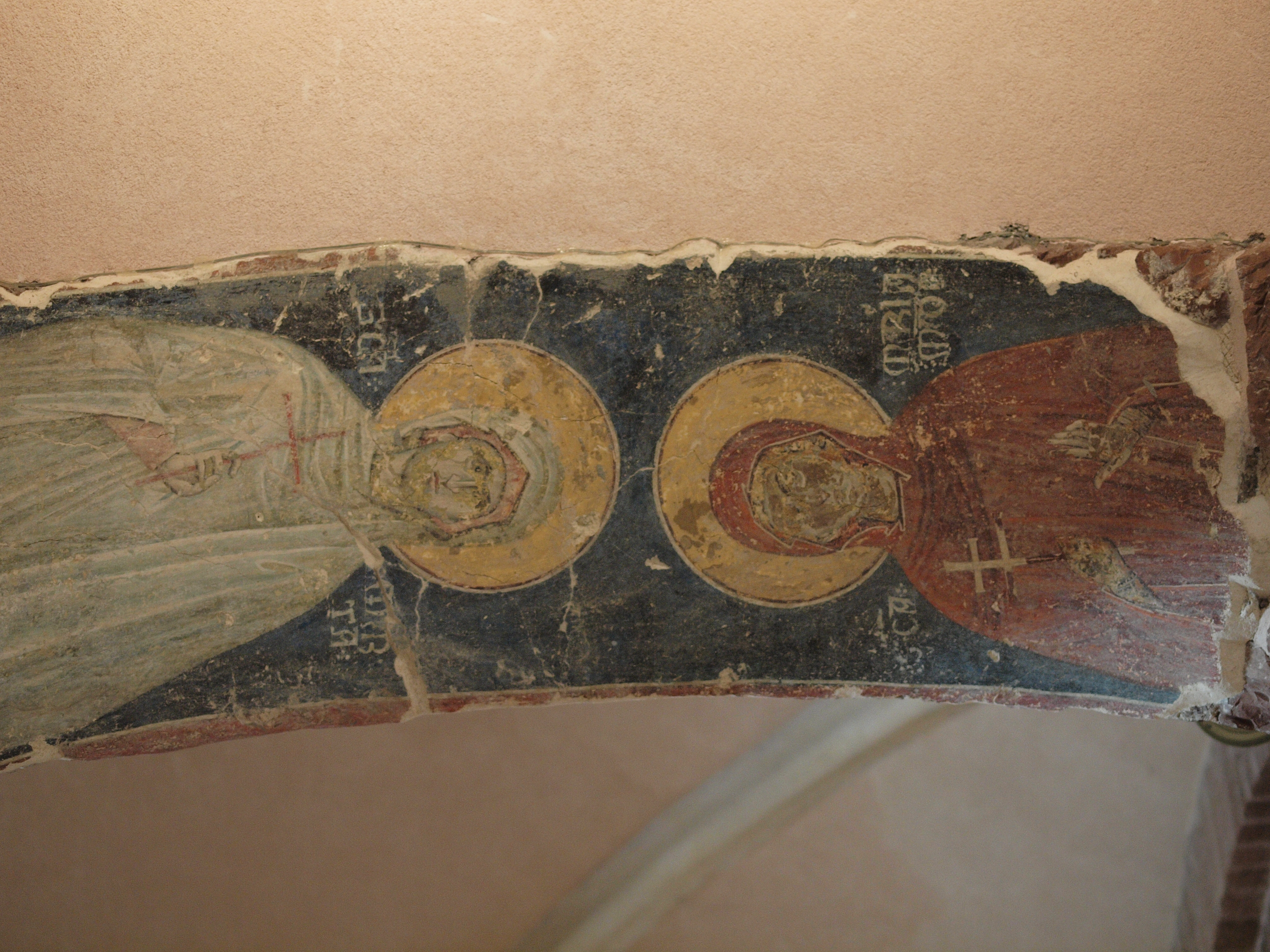

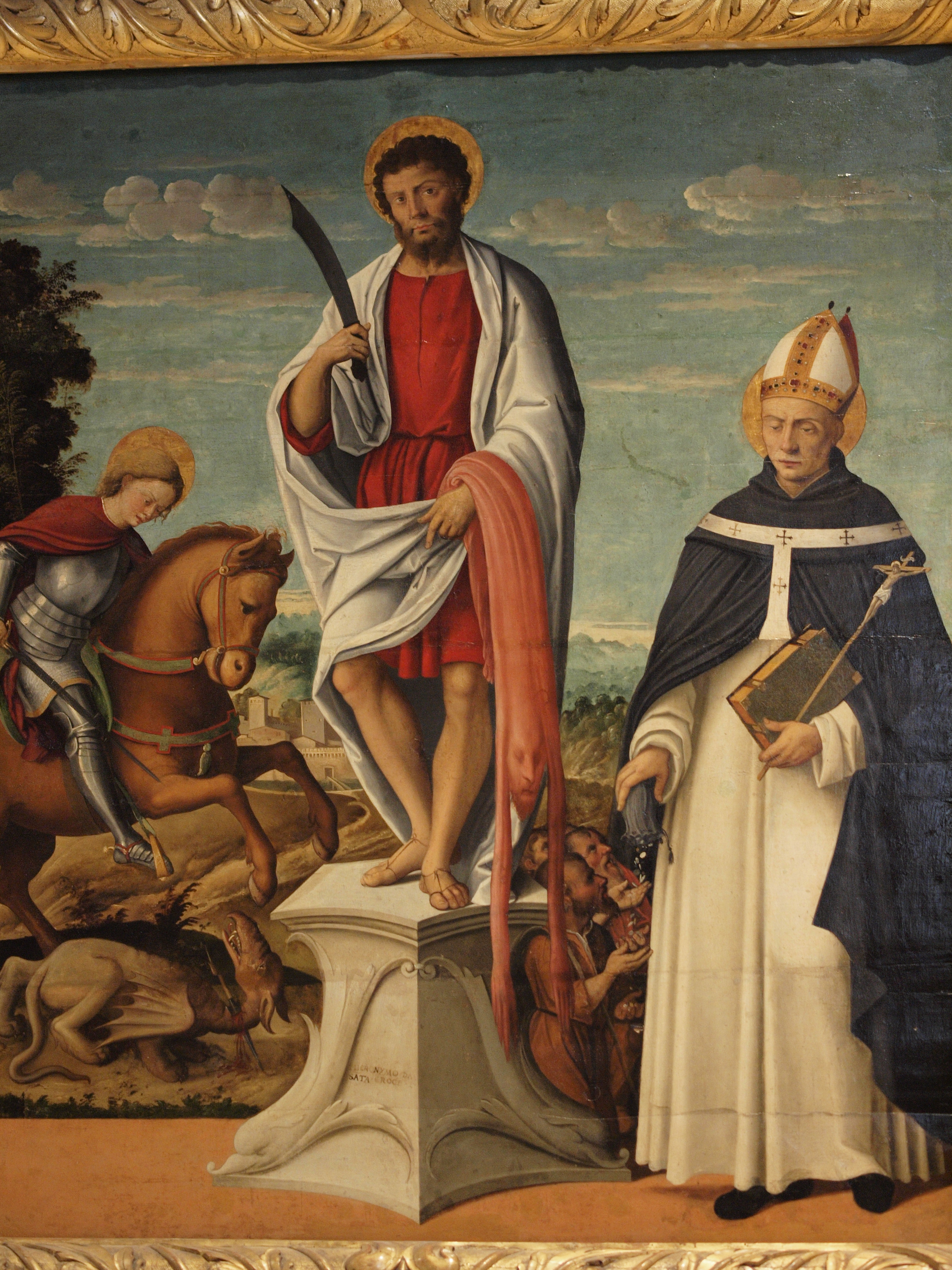

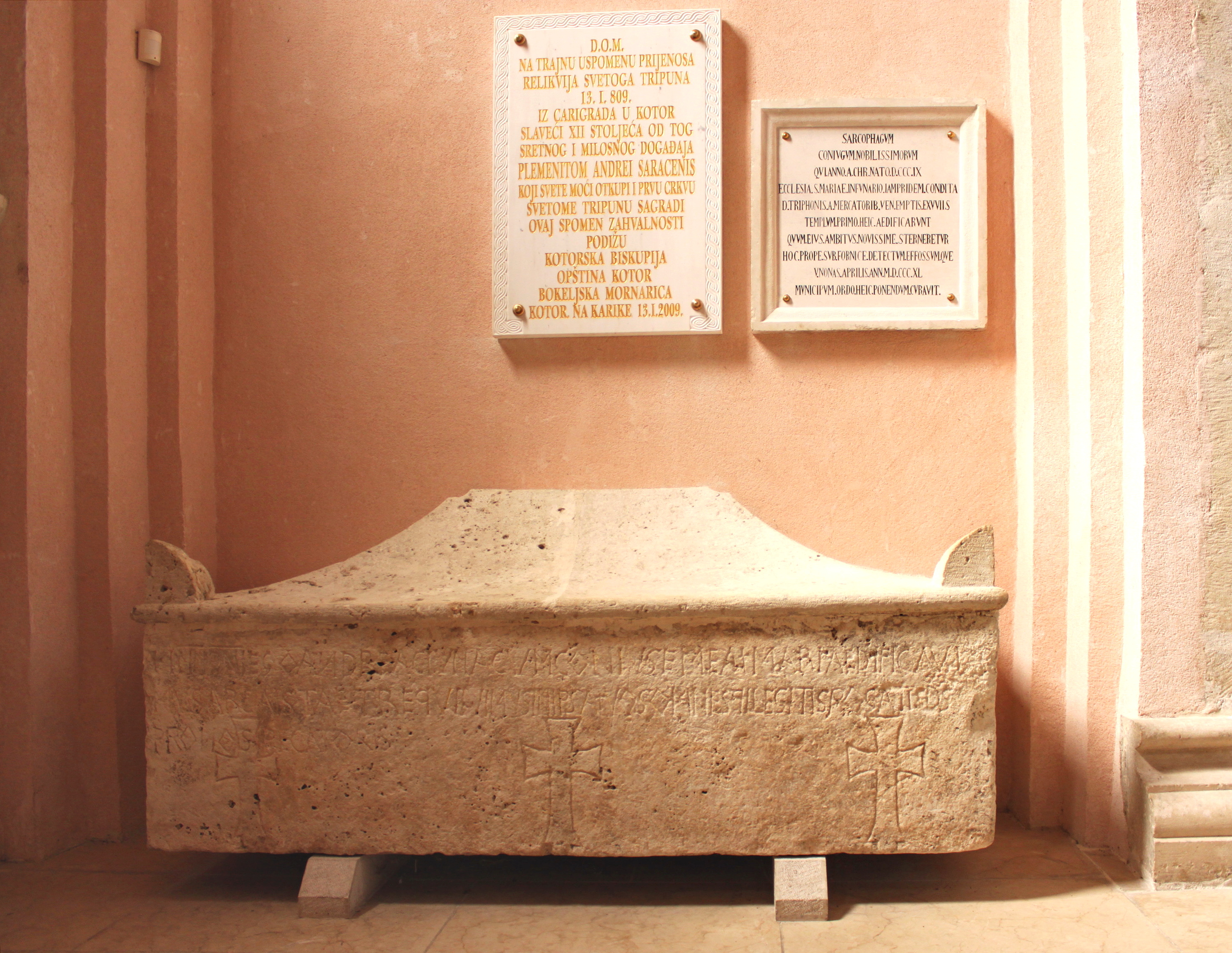

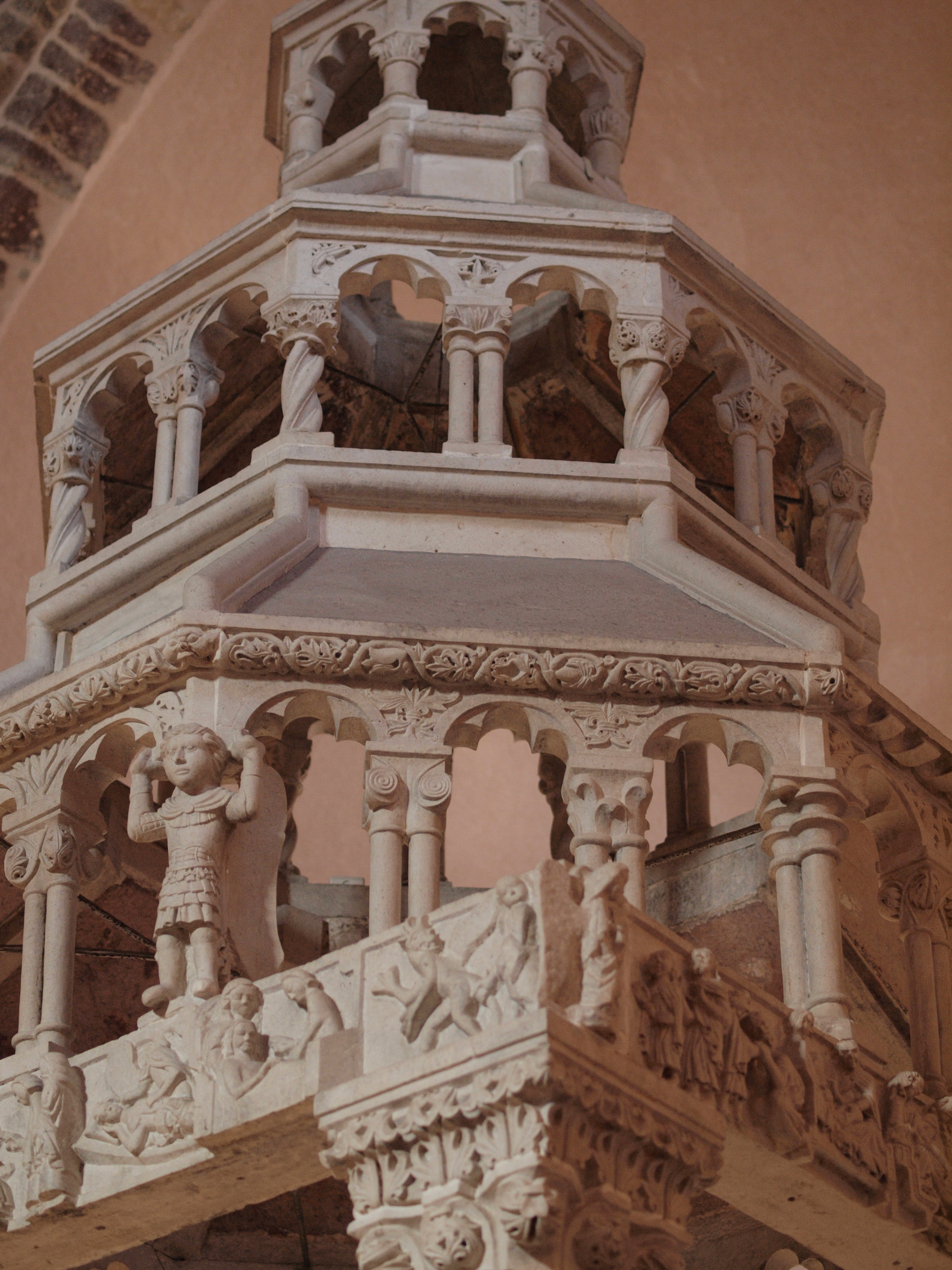

== See also ==
- Our Lady of the Rocks
- Saint Tryphon
- Catholic Church in Montenegro
