= Mostar Cathedral =

Church in Mostar, Bosnia and Herzegovina

- Cathedral of Mary, Mother of the Church
- Cathedral of Mostar
- Mostar Cathedral
- 43°20′20″N 17°47′52″E
- Country: Bosnia and Herzegovina
- Denomination: Catholic

Architecture
- Years built: 1970s

Clergy
- Archbishop: Tomo Vukšić
- Bishop: Petar Palić

The Cathedral of Mary, Mother of the Church (Croatian: Katedrala Marije Majke Crkve) also Mostar Cathedral in Mostar is one of four Roman Catholic cathedrals in Bosnia and Herzegovina. It is the seat of the Mostar-Duvno Bishopric currently led by Bishop Petar Palić.

The construction of the new cathedral in a modern style began in 1974 with the excavations for the foundations. It was built on the site of an old cathedral dating from 1872, which had been dedicated to the apostles Peter and Paul.

The project was completed in the summer of 1980, partly due to delays, changes in the original plan and architectural defects found in the presbytery area. The interior is decorated with stained glass and mosaics. During the Bosnian War the church was greatly damaged. Later it was rebuilt in its entirety.
