= Venetian Albania =

Territorial entity

Coordinates: 42°00′N 19°15′E

Venetian Albania Albania Veneta Arbëria Venedikase Mletačka Albanija Млетачка Албанија
- Colony of the Republic of Venice
- 1392–1797
- Flag Coat of arms

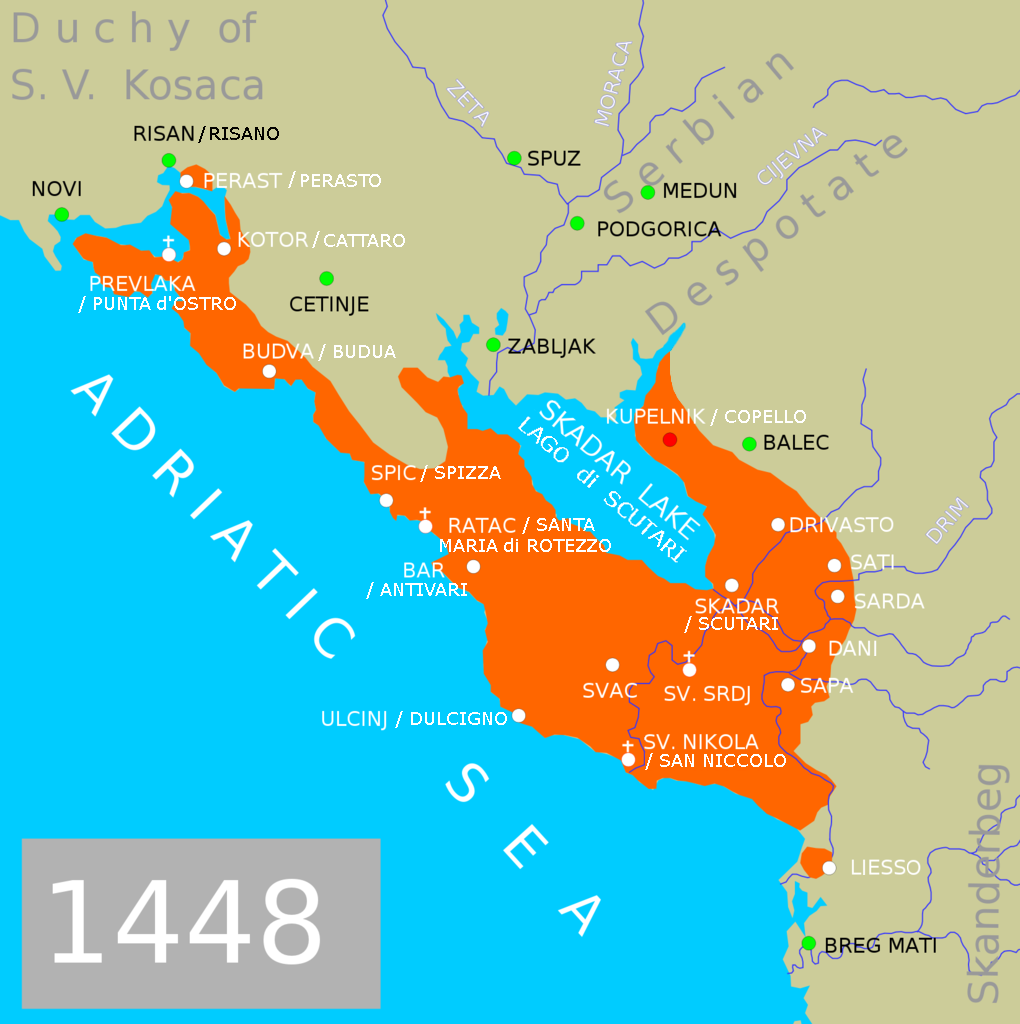
- Venetian possessions in Montenegro and Northern Albania, 1448
- Government
  - Type: Governorate
- History
  - Established: 1392
  - Disestablished: 1797
Preceded by
| Zeta under the Balšići |
| Serbian Despotate |
| Principality of Albania |
Succeeded by
| Kingdom of Dalmatia |
| Sanjak of Scutari |
- Today part of: Montenegro; Albania

Venetian Albania (Venetian: Albania vèneta, Italian: Albania Veneta, Albanian: Arbëria Venedikase, Serbo-Croatian: Mletačka Albanija, Млетачка Албанија) was the official term for several possessions of the Republic of Venice in the southeastern Adriatic, encompassing coastal territories primarily in present-day southern Montenegro and partially in northern Albania.

Several major territorial changes occurred during the Venetian rule in those regions, starting from 1392, and lasting until 1797. By the end of the 15th century, the main possessions in northern Albania had been lost to the expansion of the Ottoman Empire. In spite of that, Venetians did not want to renounce their formal claims to the Albanian coast, and the term Venetian Albania was officially kept in use, designating the remaining Venetian possessions in coastal Montenegro, centred around the Bay of Kotor. Albanian piracy flourished during this period. Those regions remained under Venetian rule until the fall of the Republic of Venice in 1797. By the Treaty of Campo Formio, the region was transferred to the Habsburg monarchy.

== Geography ==
Venice used the term "Venetian Albania" for its initial possessions that stretched from the southern borders of the Republic of Ragusa to Durrës in coastal Albania. Generally, these possessions extended not more than 20 km (12 miles) inland from the Adriatic Sea. Between the Siege of Shkodra and 1571 the territories in what is today Albania were lost. After 1573 the southern limit moved to the village of Kufin (which means border in Albanian) near Budva, because of the Ottoman conquests of Antivari (Bar), Dulcigno (Ulcinj), Scutari (Shkodër) and Durrës. From then on, the Venetian territory was centred on the Bay of Kotor and included the towns of Kotor, Risan, Perast, Tivat, Herceg Novi, Budva, and Sutomore.

From 1718 to 1797 the Venetian Republic extended its territory south towards the Republic of Ragusa while maintaining the enclaves of Cattaro (Kotor) and Budua (Budva).

== History ==
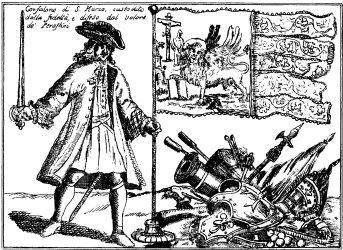
Standard-bearer of Perast (1634).

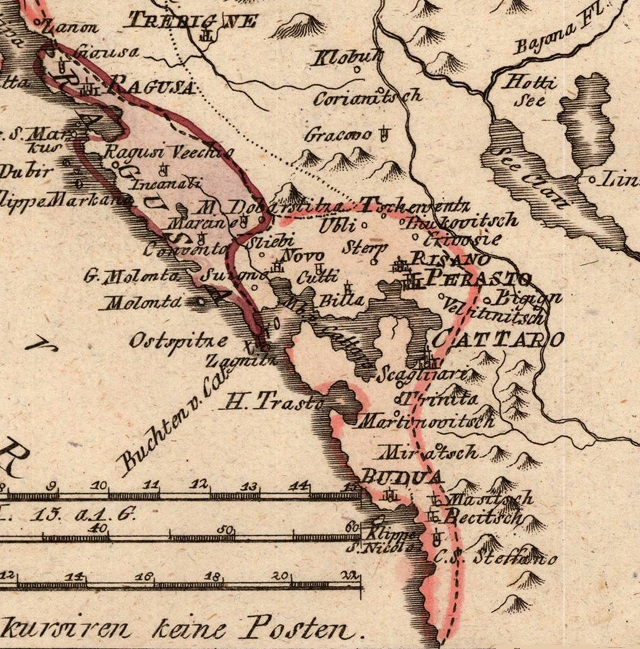
Map of the Bay of Kotor (1789).

The Venetians sporadically controlled the small southern Dalmatian villages around the 10th century but did not permanently assume control until 1420. The Venetians assimilated the Dalmatian language into the Venetian language quickly. The Venetian territories around Kotor lasted from 1420 to 1797 and were called Venetian Albania, a province of the Venetian Republic.

In the early years of the Renaissance the territories under Venetian control included areas from modern coastal Montenegro to northern Albania as far as Durrës: Venice retained this city after a siege by the Ottoman Sultan Mehmed II in 1466, but it fell to Ottoman forces in 1501.

At that time Venetian Albania was relatively rich, and the area around the city of Kotor enjoyed a huge cultural and artistic development.

When the Ottoman Empire started to conquer the Balkans in the 15th century, the population of Christian Slavs in Dalmatia increased greatly. As a consequence of this, by the end of the 17th century the Romance-speaking population of historical Venetian Albania was a minority, according to Oscar Randi.

After the French Republic conquered the Venetian Republic, the area of Venetian Albania became part of the Austrian Empire under the Treaty of Campo Formio, and then part of the Napoleonic Kingdom of Italy under the Peace of Pressburg, and then the French Illyrian Provinces under the Treaty of Schönbrunn. In 1814 it was again included in the Austrian Empire.

== Towns ==
- Cattaro. Four centuries of Venetian domination gave the city the typical Venetian architecture, that contributed to making Kotor a UNESCO world heritage site.
- Perast. Once part of Venetian Albania, was at its peak in the 18th century, when it had as many as four active shipyards, a standing fleet of around a hundred ships, and 1,643 residents. At that time several architecturally significant buildings were constructed in this fortified town. Many ornate baroque palaces and houses were decorated the town of Perast, built in the Venetian style. Citizens of Perast (the population was around 1,600 at the time) enjoyed privileges from the Venetian Republic. They were allowed to trade with large ships and to sell goods without tax on the Venetian market, which created considerable income for the town.
- Budva. The Venetians ruled the town for nearly 400 years, from 1420 to 1797. Budva, called "Budua" in those centuries, was part of the Venetian Republic region of Albania Veneta and was fortified by powerful Venetian walls against Ottoman conquests. According to the historian Luigi Paulucci in his book "Le Bocche di Cattaro nel 1810" (The Bay of Kotor in 1810), most of the population spoke the Venetian language until the beginning of the 19th century. One of the most renowned theatre librettists and composers, Cristoforo Ivanovich, was born in Venetian Budua.
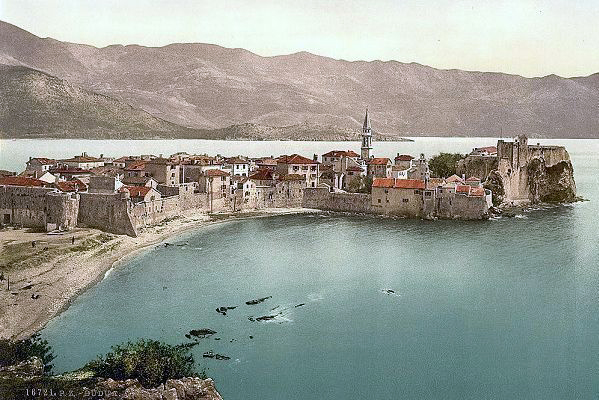
Budva, 1900 postcard

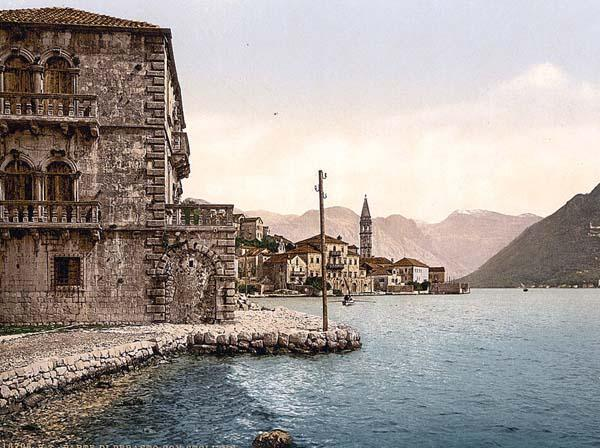
Perast, 1900 postcard

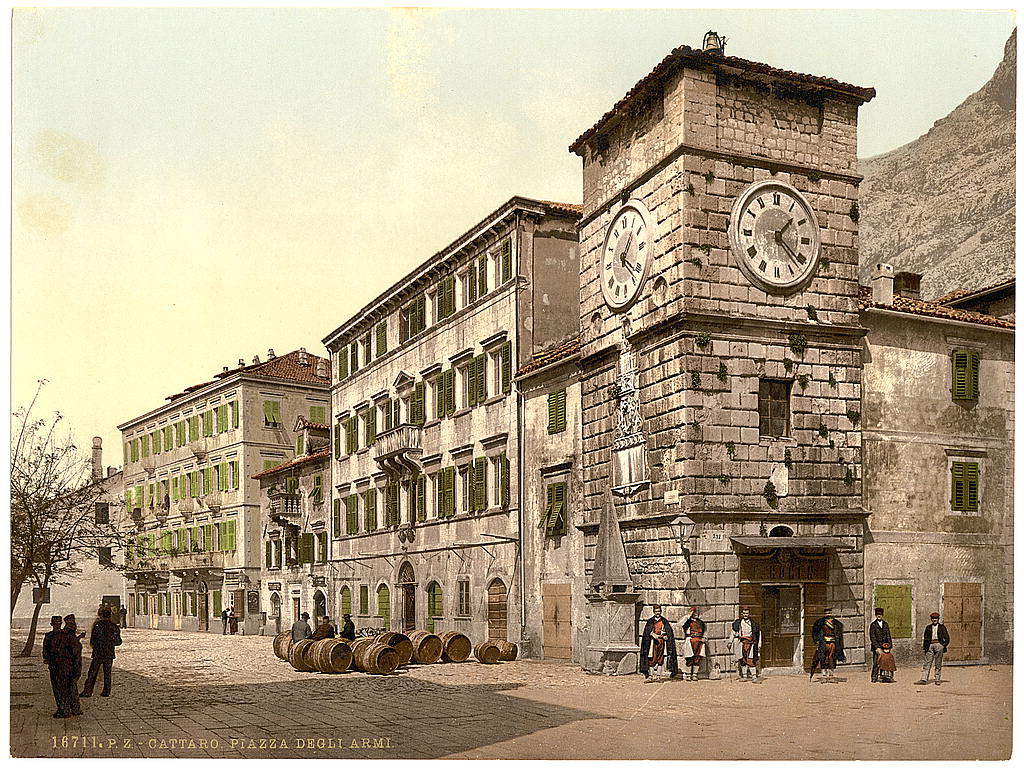
Postcard of Old Cattaro, showing typical Venetian architecture buildings and the "Clock tower"

== Population ==
According to the Dalmatian historian Luigi Paulucci (in his book Le Bocche di Cattaro nel 1810) the population of Venetian Albania, during the centuries of the Republic of Venice, was mainly Venetian speaking (approximately 66%) in the urban areas (Cattaro, Perasto, Budua, etc.) around the "Bocche di Cattaro" (Bay of Kotor).

Venetian Albania in purple

But in the inland areas, more than half of the population was Serbo-Croatian speaking during the early years of the 18th century. Paulucci wrote that near the border with Albania, there were large communities of Albanian-speaking people: Ulcinj was half Albanian, one-quarter Venetian and one-quarter Slavic-speaking.

After the disappearance of Venetian Albania, during the nineteenth century (according to the historian Marzio Scaglioni) the wars of independence of some Italian territories from the Austro-Hungarian empire created a situation of harassment against the Italian (or Venetian-speaking) communities in Austrian-ruled southern Dalmatia. The result was that in 1880 in Cattaro there were, according to the Austrian census, only 930 ethnic Italians remained (or 32% of a total population of 2910 people). Thirty years later, in the Austrian census of 1910, the Italians were reduced to only 13.6% of that city's population. Today there are around 500 Italian speakers in Montenegro, mainly in the area of Cattaro (Kotor), who constitute the "Comunitá Nazionale Italiana del Montenegro" (Italian National Community of Montenegro).

== Notable people ==
Many notable people were born in the "Cattaro Bay" (now called Bay of Kotor) during the Venetian rule.

Arts and Literature

- Giovanni Bona de Boliris, humanist poet and writer
- Cristoforo Ivanovich, librettist and opera historian
- Ludovico Pasquali, writer
- Tomo Medin, adventurer and writer
- Stefano Zannowich, adventurer and writer
- Andrija Paltašić, printer
- Božidar Vuković, printer
- Tripo Smeća, historian
- Andrija Zmajević, Baroque poet
- Vićenco Vuković, printer
- Jerolim Zagurović, printer
- Stefan Marinović, printer
- Tripo Kokolja, painter
- Dimitrije Daskal, painter
- Lovro Dobričević, painter

Nobility and military personnel

- Julije Balović, military officer, captain, judge, and collector of epic poetry
- Vicko Bujović, military commander
- Giuseppe Viscovich, Count and last Venetian Captain to surrender in 1797
- Krsto Zmajević, merchant captain
- Matija Zmajević, adventurer and admiral of the Baltic Fleet under Tsar Peter the Great of Russia
- Mariano Bolizza, nobleman

Clergy

- Georgius Pelino, abbot and diplomat
- Lodovico Chieregati, Archbishop of Antivari
- Toma Ursini, Archbishop of Antivari and Primate of Serbia
- Vicko Zmajević, Archbishop of Antivari and Primate of Serbia
- Ivan Paskvali, Catholic missionary
- Mojsije Dečanac, printer of liturgy and Orthodox hierodeacon
- Paolo Bisanti, Bishop of Cattaro and Vicar of the Patriarchate of Aquileia

== See also ==
- Stato da Màr
- Medieval Albanian coinage

== Bibliography ==
- Bartl, Peter. Le picciole Indie dei Veneziani. Zur Stellung Albaniens in den Handelsbeziehungen zwischen der Balkan- und der Appenninenhalbinsel. In: Münchner Zeitschrift für Balkankunde 4 (1981–1982) 1–10.
- Bartl, Peter. Der venezianische Türkenkrieg im Jahre 1690 nach den Briefen des päpstlichen Offiziers Guido Bonaventura. In: Südost-Forschungen 26 (1967) 88–101.
- Cecchetti, Bartolomeo. Intorno agli stabilimenti politici della repubblica veneta nell'Albania. In: Atti del Regio Istituto veneto di scienze, lettere ed arti. Bd. 3, Seria 4, S. 978–998. 1874.
- De Brodmann, Giuseppe. Memorie politico-economiche della citta e territorio di Trieste, della penisola d’Istria, della Dalmazia fu Veneta, di Ragusi e dell’Albania, ora congiunti all’Austriaco Impero. Venezia 1821.
- De Castro, Diego. Dalmazia, popolazione e composizione etnica. Cenno storico sul rapporto etnico tra Italiani e Slavi nella Dalmazia. ISPI 1978.
- Gelcich, Giuseppe. Memorie storiche sulle bocche di Cattaro. Zara 1880.
- Frederick Hamilton Jackson (2010). The Shores of the Adriatic (Illustrated ed.). Echo Library. pp. 287–. ISBN 9781406867619.
- Martin, John Jeffries. Venice Reconsidered. The History and Civilization of an Italian City-State, 1297–1797. Johns Hopkins UP. New York, 2002.
- Malcolm, Noel. Agents of Empire. Oxford UP. 2015.
- Norwich, John Julius. A History of Venice. Vintage Books. New York, 1989.
- Paulucci, Luigi. Le Bocche di Cattaro nel 1810 Edizioni Italo Svevo. Trieste, 2005.
- Schmitt, Oliver Jens (2001). Das venezianische Albanien (1392-1479). München: Oldenbourg Verlag. ISBN 978-3-486-56569-0.
