= Zmajević =

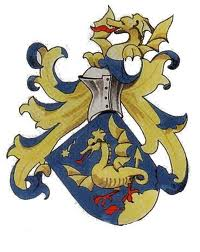
Coat of arms of Zmajević noble family

Zmajević is a Slavic surname, derived from the Slavic word for "dragon" (zmaj). Zmajević noble family of the Early modern period, hailing from the Bay of Kotor (now in Montenegro), was active in the Republic of Venice and the Russian Empire. This family hailed from Njeguši; when the last members of the Crnojević family left Principality of Zeta, Nikola Zmajević and his cousins Ivaniš and Vučeta moved to Kotor. Becoming appealed and somewhat wealthy, the family quickly converted from Christian Orthodoxy in favor of Roman Catholicism, with the three marrying Catholic girls and having their children baptized in the Latin Rite.

== Descendants ==
It may refer to:

- Andrija Zmajević (1624–1694), baroque poet and Catholic archbishop
- Krsto Zmajević (1640–1698), captain
- Vicko Zmajević (1670–1745), Catholic archbishop
- Matija Zmajević (1680–1735), Imperial admiral of the Russian fleet
