= Marino Bizzi =

17th-century Venetian Roman Catholic prelate

- Archbishop of Bar (Antivari)
- Church: Catholic Church
- See: Archbishop of Bar
- Appointed: 4 February 1608
- Term ended: 16 September 1624
- Predecessor: Toma Ursini
- Successor: Pjetër Mazreku

Orders
- Consecration: 20 April 1608 (Bishop) by Cardinal Giovanni Delfino

Personal details
- Born: 1565 Rab (Arbe)
- Died: 1 February 1625 (aged 59–60) Rome

Marino Bizzi (or Bizza, Latin: Marinus Bizzius, Croatian: Marin Bici; 1565–1625) was a Venetian patrician in Dalmatia, and a prelate of the Catholic Church as Archbishop of Antivari (Bar).

== Life ==
Marino Bizzi was born in 1565 on the island of Rab (Arbe), part of the Republic of Venice (in present-day Croatia) to an aristocratic and wealthy family of Albanian origin. He served as main priest of the cathedral of that town till 4 February 1608 when Pope Paul V appointed him as the Archbishop of Bar (Antivari) and the administrator of the diocese of Budua. He was consecrated in Rome by Cardinal Giovanni Delfino on 20 April 1608, then he moved in Venice where he obtained the permission from the Consiglio dei Pregadi to enter in Budua (Budva), a town located in the mainland Albania in the Ottoman Empire.

He also needed the authorization of the Ottoman government to enter that country, and through Mahmut Bushati Bizzi, obtained a firman from Sultan Ahmed I, allowing him entry into Antivari. After obtaining the firman, Bizzi went off to live in the house of Asan Çelebi in Antivari. However, his life was always in danger. Because of unsettled conditions within his diocese, Bizzi had his seat in Budua, where he only lived for three years.

At the beginning of 1610, Bizzi had set off on a journey to visit his ecclesiastical regions, which were under Turkish rule, only to return by the end of the year. He travelled to Rome the following year, eventually settling in Rome, in the house of Cardinal Savelli. His last years were marked by a conflict of jurisdiction over the land in Serbia with the Bishop of Prizren, Petrus Katich. His resignation from his archbishopric was accepted by the Pope on 16 September 1624. Marino Bizzi died in Rome on 1 February 1625.

During his reign as Archbishop, he provided a detailed report of the Archbishopric, which would later become a widely used authentic historical source.

On another note, his reign also saw many Buduan locals from the Paštrović tribe (pleme) converted to Roman Catholicism.

== See also ==
- Mariano Bolizza (fl. 1614)
