= Andrew I =

Andrew I may refer to:

- Andrew I of Hungary (c. 1015 – before 1060)
- Andrew I, Archbishop of Antivari (14th century)
- Andrei of Polotsk (c. 1325–1399)
- King Andrew the First, American political cartoon
