= Giuseppe Maria Bonaldi =

Roman Catholic archbishop

- Archbishop of Bar
- Church: Catholic Church
- See: Archbishop of Bar
- Appointed: 10 September 1646
- Term ended: November 1653
- Predecessor: Francesco Leonardi
- Successor: Marco Crisio

Orders
- Consecration: 25 November 1646 (Bishop) by Giovan Francesco Morosini

Personal details
- Born: 1605 Zadar, Venetian Republic
- Died: November 1653 (aged 47–48) Budva, Venetian Republic

Giuseppe Maria Bonaldi or Buonaldi (Italian: Giuseppe Maria Bonaldi, Croatian: Josip Marija Bonaldi, Latin: Iosephus Maria Bonaldus) was the Archbishop of Bar in 1646–1653.

He was born in Zadar (Zara) in 1605. He entered in the Dominican Order and he studied in Rome. He worked as a missionary in the diocese of Trebinje, and in 1644 he sent to Propaganda Fide a report on the local religious life under the Ottoman Empire. In 1644 he was appointed professor of theology in the Dominican convent of Santa Maria sopra Minerva in Rome.

Pope Innocent X appointed Bonaldi as the Archbishop of Bar (Antivari) on 10 September 1646, with an annual income of 200 Roman scudi. On Sunday 25 November 1646 he was consecrated bishop in the Venetian church of Santi Giovanni e Paolo by the Patriarch of Venice Giovan Francesco Morosini.

With the bishops from Ottoman-controlled lands, Bonaldi forged plans for freedom, presenting them to the Venetian admiral, Leonardo Foscolo. He participated to the conquest of Klis by Foscolo in 1648. The following year, Foscolo turned to southern Montenegro, unloading his guns near Antivari. However, the Ottoman army was awaiting his arrival to which Foscolo retreated. By then, a pogrom among Bar's Catholic population occurred, in which a large number of Catholics converted to Islam. Bonaldi lived in the region of Paštrovići, where he converted many Muslims to Catholicism. He returned in Rome in 1648 up to the next year when he returned in Dalmatia.

Bonaldi died from tuberculosis in November 1653. He was buried in the cathedral of Budva. After his death, the Archbishopric of Bar was temporarily administered by Pjetër Bogdani, Bishop of Scutari.
