= Petrus Katich =

17th century European bishop

Most Reverend Petrus Katich
- Bishop of Prizren
- Church: Catholic Church
- In office: 1618–1622

Orders
- Consecration: 24 Feb 1618 by Giovanni Garzia Mellini

Personal details
- Born: 1563 Sibenico, Republic of Venice
- Died: Mar 1622 (age 59)

Petrus Katich or Petrus Catich (1563–1622) was a Roman Catholic prelate who served as Bishop of Prizren (1618–1622).

== Biography ==
Petrus Katich was born in Sibenico (now Šibenik, Croatia) in 1563. On 12 Feb 1618, he was appointed during the papacy of Pope Paul V as Bishop of Prizren. On 24 Feb 1618, he was consecrated bishop by Giovanni Garzia Mellini, Cardinal-Priest of Santi Quattro Coronati, with Marinus Bizzius (Bici), Archbishop of Bar, and Gavino Manca de Cedrelles, Archbishop of Sassari, serving as co-consecrators. He served as Bishop of Prizren until his death in Mar 1622.

== External links and additional sources ==
- Cheney, David M. "Diocese of Prizren". Catholic-Hierarchy.org. (for Chronology of Bishops) ^{[self-published]}
- Chow, Gabriel. "Apostolic Administration of Prizren (Kosovo)". GCatholic.org. (for Chronology of Bishops) ^{[self-published]}

Catholic Church titles
| Preceded by | Bishop of Prizren; 1618–1622 | Succeeded by |
