= Ludovico Pasquali =

Italian poet

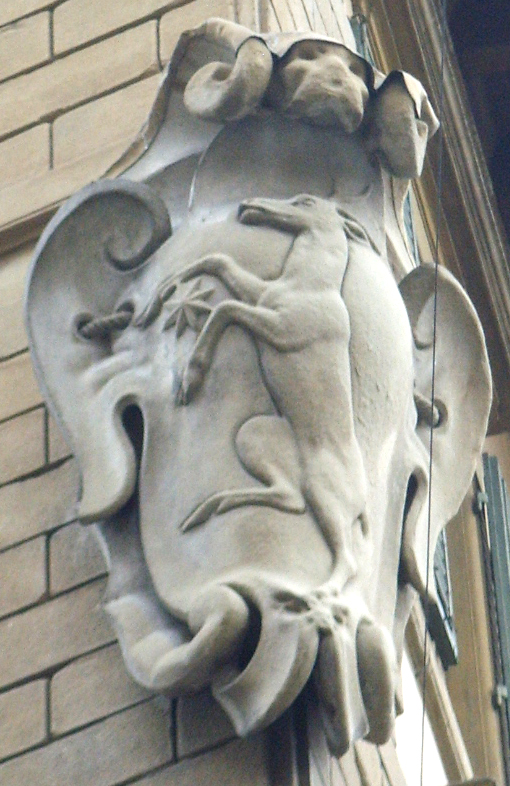
Coat of arms of the Pasquali

Ludovico Pasquali (c. 1500 – 1551) was a poet in the Italian and Latin languages from Cattaro in modern Montenegro, then ruled by the Republic of Venice.

== Life ==
Pasquali was born and died in Kotor, in the Albania Veneta (today in Montenegro). He was from an ancient Dalmatian family with roots in Florence. He was a friend, admirer and fellow countryman of Giovanni Bona Boliris. Pasquali studied in the University of Padova and -after being enslaved in Crete by the Turks- returned to his hometown where he spent all his remaining life promoting the culture of Renaissance Italy.

He was judged the best "poet" of Venetian Dalmatia during the 16th century.

Pasquali wrote a 1549 collection of poems in Italian, Rime Volgari ("Popular Rhymes" – Italian was often called "volgare", with the meaning of "popular", well into the 16th century: it was thought to be the popular version of Latin). His volume in Latin Carmina ("Poems") was printed in 1551.

=== Works ===
- Rime volgari di m. Ludouico Paschale da catharo Dalmatino. Non piu date in luce., In Vinegia: appresso Steffano et Battista cognati al segno de S. Moise, 1549
- Ludovici Pascalis Iulii Camilli, Molsae, et aliorum illustrium poetarum carmina, ad illustriss. et doctiss. marchionem Auriae Bernardinum Bonifatium per Ludouicum Dulcium nunc primum in lucem aedita., Venetiis: apud Gabrielem Iolitum et fratres De Ferrariis, 1551

== Legacy ==
Giacomo Scotti described Pasquali as one of the most "Italians" of the Dalmatian poets: he never wrote in Serbo-Croatian, but only in Italian and sometimes in Latin.

The Croatian Encyclopedia describes him as a 'Croatian poet' and notes his works in Italian and Latin.

== See also ==
- Giovanni Bona Boliris
- Mariano Bolizza
- Dalmatian Italians
- Venetian Cattaro
