= Descriptio Europae Orientalis =

Latin geographical treatise

Start of the Descriptio in the Leiden manuscript (c. 1400)

The Descriptio Europae Orientalis ('Description of Eastern Europe') is an anonymous Latin geographical treatise written in France in the spring of 1308. The author was a Catholic hostile to the Orthodox and to the Serbian Bogomils. He was probably a Dominican. According to one hypothesis, the author was Andreas Hungarus, a Hungarian priest who became the archbishop of Bar in Albania in 1307.

The treatise was written for Charles, Count of Valois, who was preparing a crusade against the Byzantine Empire in furtherance of his claim to Constantinople. It is very similar in genre to the contemporary treatises on the recovery of the Holy Land, although its object is different.

The countries covered in the Descriptio are Albania, Bohemia, Bulgaria, Halych (Ruthenia), Hungary, Poland, Serbia (Rascia) and the Byzantine Empire. The geography, politics, culture and economy of these kingdoms are described. It has been argued that his knowledge of Albania and Hungary was better than that of countries further east. He mislocates Trebizond and Sinope. His written sources included texts like the Speculum historiale of Vincent of Beauvais and the Flor des estoires de la terre d'Orient of Hayton of Korykos. Although the text gives a geographically accurate description of Eastern Europe, it is often based on myths or hearsay, and the author does not seem to have used local historical documents to write it.

The treatise contains a very positive and detailed description of Hungary, as its author presumably wanted to persuade the French king that the best ally in the area was Charles I of Hungary. Also, the chronicle describes the territories that the Hungarians could potentially conquer, so that the Hungarian kingdom could claim them:

"If Lord Charles were in possession of the Greek [Byzantine] empire, having made an alliance with the King of Hungary (...) he could easily seize and subjugate all the heretic and barbarian peoples who occupy so rich and beautiful a territory as wrongful possessors. Even if Charles himself could not acquire the whole of the so-called empire of the Greeks, he himself, on one side, and the above-mentioned king of Hungary, on the other, could conquer the said empire and the peoples in question."

The Descriptio is preserved in five manuscripts, the earliest from the 14th century. The text has been translated into Hungarian, Romanian and Serbian. There is an English translation of the section relating to Albania.

== Bibliography ==
- Borzákné Nacsa, Mária (1985). A Descriptio Europae Orientalis eszmei háttere és politikai célzatossága (PDF) (PhD dissertation). University of Szeged.
- Csákó, Judit (2020). A rómaiak pannóniai legelője. Megjegyzések egy hagyomány keletkezéséhez (II. rész). Magyar Tudományos Akadémia.
- Elsie, Robert, ed. (2003). Early Albania: A Reader of Historical Texts, 11th–17th Centuries. Harrassowitz Verlag.
- Grzesik, Ryszard (2010). "Descriptio Europae Orientalis". In Graeme Dunphy (ed.). Encyclopedia of the Medieval Chronicle. Vol. 1. Brill. pp. 518–519.
- Leopold, Antony R. (2000). How to Recover the Holy Land: The Crusade Proposals of the Late Thirteenth and Early Fourteenth Centuries. Ashgate. ISBN 9780754601203.
- Madgearu, Alexandru (2008). The Wars of the Balkan Peninsula: Their Medieval Origins. The Scarecrow Press.
- Živković, Tibor; Petrović, Vladeta; Uzelac, Aleksandar; Kunčer, Dragana, eds. (2013). Anonymi Descriptio Europae Orientalis = Anonimov Opis istočne Evrope: kritičko izdanje teksta na latinskom jeziku, prevod i filološka analiza Dragana Kunčer (PDF). Istorijski institut Beograd. ISBN 9788677431020.
