= Francesco Leonardi =

Francesco Leonardi may refer to:

- Francesco Leonardi (missionary) (died 1646), Italian missionary
- Francesco Leonardi (chef), 18th-century Italian chef and food writer
