= Andrew of Hungary =

Andrew of Hungary or Andreas Hungarus may refer to:

- Andrew I of Hungary, reign 1046–1060
- Andrew II of Hungary, reign 1205–1235
- Andrew III of Hungary, reign 1290–1301
- Andrew of Hungary, Prince of Halych (died 1233/4)
- Andrew of Hungary (historian) (fl. 1270)
- Andrew I, Archbishop of Antivari (r. 1307–1324), Hungarian prelate
- Andrew, Duke of Calabria (1327–1345), Hungarian prince murdered by order of his wife Joanna I of Naples

== See also ==
- Andreas Pannonius, Hungarian Renaissance theologian
