= Petar Perkolić =

Roman Catholic archbishop

The Most Reverend Petar Perkolić
- Archbishop of Bar and Primate of Serbia
- Church: Catholic Church
- Archdiocese: Bar
- Appointed: 6 May 1979
- Retired: 27 June 1998
- Predecessor: Aleksandar Tokić
- Successor: Zef Gashi
- Other post: Archbishop Coadjutor of Bar (1978–79)

Orders
- Ordination: 18 March 1945
- Consecration: 18 March 1979 by Michele Cecchini

Personal details
- Born: 14 August 1922 Stari Bar, Kingdom of Serbes, Croats and Slovenes
- Died: 7 September 2006 (aged 84) Cetinje, Montenegro
- Buried: Bar, Montenegro
- Denomination: Catholic
- Education: Pontifical Urban University

Petar Perkolić (Montenegrin: Петар Перколић; Albanian: Pjetër Perkolaj; 14 August 1922 – 7 September 2006) was a Montenegrin prelate of the Catholic Church who served as the archbishop of Bar from 1978 to his retirement in 1998.

Perkolić was born in Stari Bar. Although being of Albanian ethnic descent, he declared himself as a Montenegrin. He studied at the Pontifical Urban University where he became a master of theology. Perkolić was ordained a priest in Rome on 18 March 1945. While preparing for postgraduate studies, he was invited by his archbishop Nikola Dobrečić to return to the archdiocese, where he served as the archbishop's advisor. Perkolić also served in the parish of Šestani from 1946 to 1965 and then in Cetinje from 1965 to 1979.

On 19 December 1978, Perkolić was appointed the archbishop coadjutor to the archbishop Aleksandar Tokić. He was consecrated a bishop on 18 March 1979 in Titograd. Tokić died on 6 May 1979 and was succeeded by Perkolić. Perkolić retired on 27 June 1998. After his retirement, he worked as a spiritual assistant to the Poor Clares in Cetinje. Perkolić studied the history of the Archdiocese of Bar. In 2005 he published a collection of poems titled "U sjenci Rumije" (Under the Shadow of Rumija).

Perkolić died in Cetinje on 7 September 2006 and was buried on 9 September 2006 at the St. Nicholas Church in Bar.
