= Zef Gashi =

Catholic bishop

His Excellency Zef Gashi
- Archbishop Emeritus of Bar
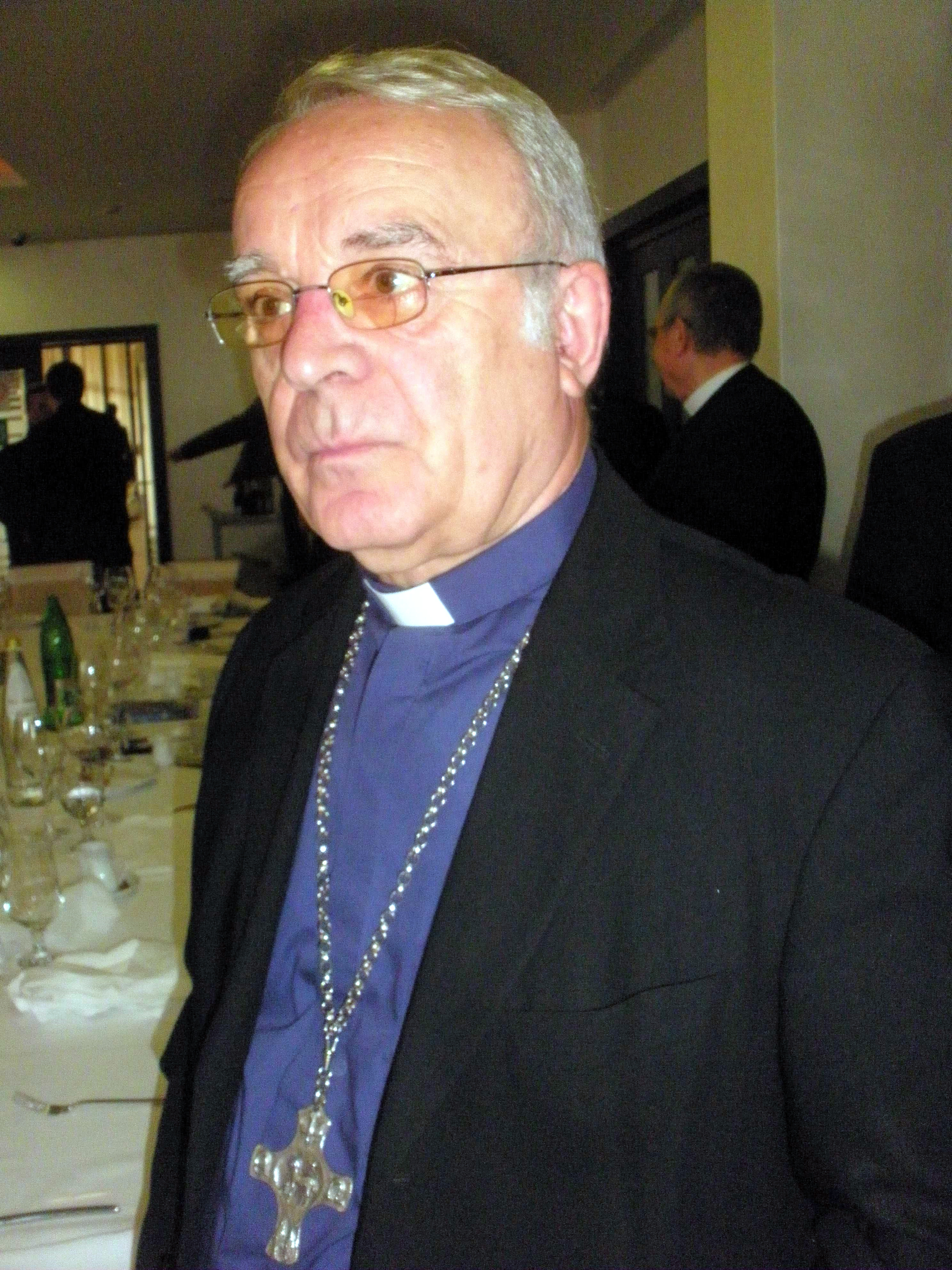
- Church: Roman Catholic
- Archdiocese: Roman Catholic Archdiocese of Bar
- Elected: 1998
- Term ended: 2016
- Predecessor: Peter IV
- Successor: Rrok Gjonlleshaj

Personal details
- Born: 14 December 1938 (age 87) Pristina, Kingdom of Yugoslavia (modern Kosovo)

Zef Gashi (Cyrillic: Зеф Гаши / Zef Gaši; born 4 December 1938) is an ethnic Albanian prelate of the Roman Catholic Church in Montenegro. He was the Archbishop of the Roman Catholic Archdiocese of Bar between 1998 and 2016.

Zef Gashi was born on December 14, 1938 in Pristina, Kingdom of Yugoslavia (modern Kosovo). In 1964, he was ordained priest of the order of the Salesians of Don Bosco. In 1998, he became the archbishop of the Roman Catholic Archdiocese of Bar. He was retired in 2016.

Catholic Church titles
Preceded by Apostolic administrator Sopi †24 May 2006	Apostolic administrator of Prizren; 2006	Succeeded by Gjergji appointed on December 12, 2006
Preceded by Archbishop Perkolić	Archbishop of Bar; 1998–2016	Succeeded by Archbishop Gjonlleshaj
