= Anton Kryezezi =

Prelate of the Roman Catholic Church

Anton Kryezezi (c. 1710 – 1765) was an Albanian prelate of the Roman Catholic Church.

== Life ==
Born in Lezhë, northern Albania around 1710 he joined the Franciscan orders and studied in the Urban College. He served as abbot in Mirditë until 1750, when he was ordained as bishop of Diocese of Lezhë, a post in which he served until his death in 1765. In 1753 he authored a report on the conditions of the Catholic church in his diocese.
