= Opanci, Croatia =

Settlement in Split-Dalmatia County, Croatia

Opanci
- Settlement
- Interactive map of Opanci
- Location of Opanci in Croatia
- Coordinates: 43°28′48″N 16°58′30″E
- Country: Croatia
- County: Split-Dalmatia
- Municipality: Lovreć

Area
  - Total: 16.1 km^{2} (6.2 sq mi)

Population (2021)
  - Total: 258
  - Density: 16.0/km^{2} (41.5/sq mi)
- Time zone: UTC+1 (CET)
  - Summer (DST): UTC+2 (CEST)
- Postal code: 21256 Cista Provo
- Area code: +385 (0)21

Opanci is a settlement in the Municipality of Lovreć in Croatia. In 2021, its population was 258.

== Demographics ==
Opanci: Population trends 1857–2021
v

| population | 635 | 780 | 889 | 1051 | 1163 | 1327 | 1422 | 1338 | 1396 | 1235 | 1153 | 1110 | 885 | 671 | 469 | 321 | 258 |
| | 1857 | 1869 | 1880 | 1890 | 1900 | 1910 | 1921 | 1931 | 1948 | 1953 | 1961 | 1971 | 1981 | 1991 | 2001 | 2011 | 2021 |

Sources: Croatian Bureau of Statistics publications
