= Immaculate Conception Cathedral, Bar =

Immaculate Conception Cathedral
- Katedrala Bezgrešnog Začeća (Montenegrin) Katedralja e Ngjizjes së Papërlyer të Zojës Mari (Albanian)
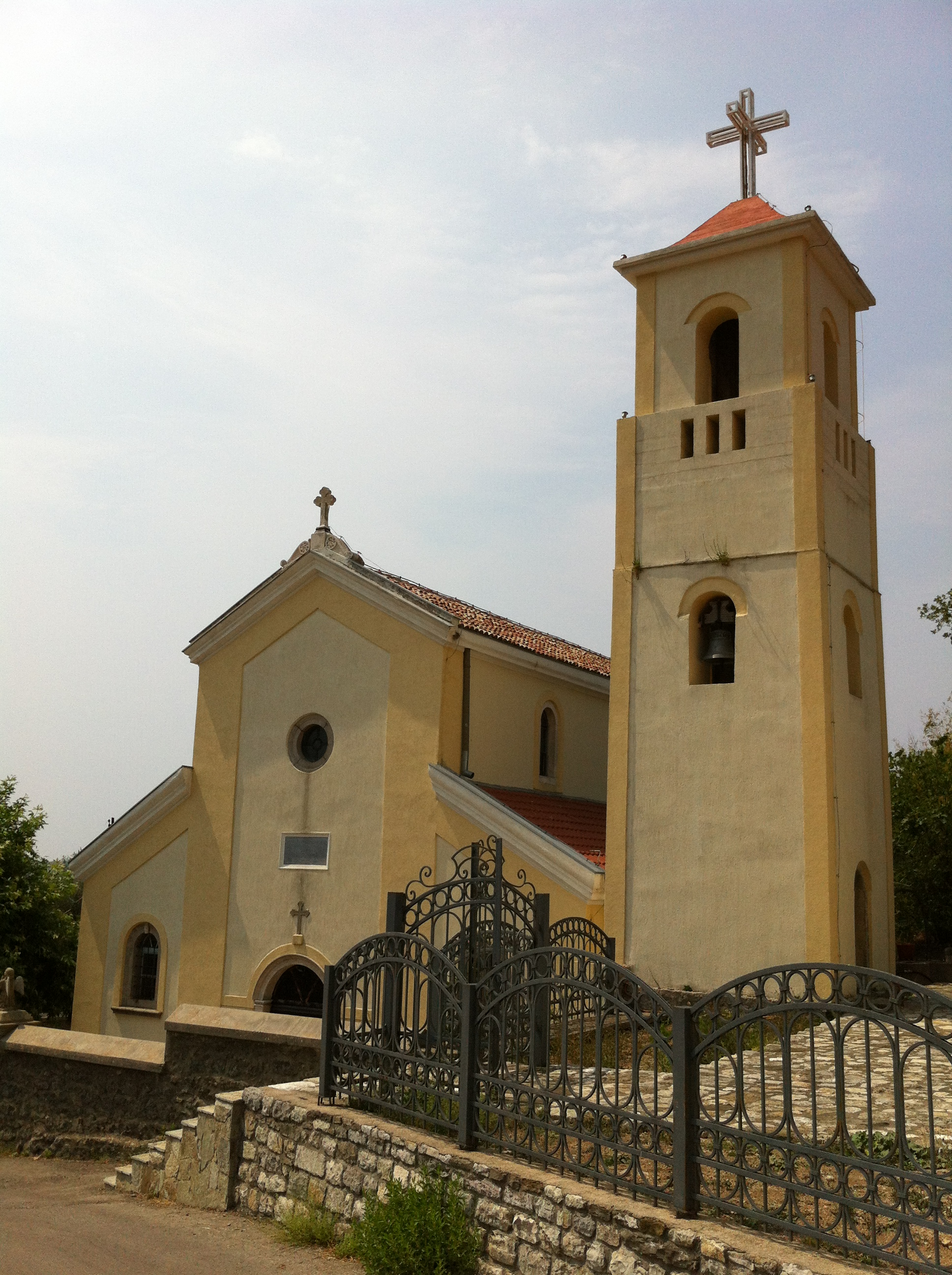

- Location within Montenegro
- Immaculate Conception Cathedral
- 42°06′N 19°06′E
- Location: Stari Bar
- Country: Montenegro
- Denomination: Latin Church

Administration
- Archdiocese: Archdiocese of Bar

The Immaculate Conception Cathedral (Montenegrin: Катедрала Безгрешног Зачећа, romanized: Katedrala Bezgrešnog Začeća, Albanian: Katedralja e Ngjizjes së Papërlyer të Zojës Mari) in Stari Bar, Montenegro is the former cathedral of the Roman Catholic Archdiocese of Bar, which aside from the Bay of Kotor and the Municipality of Budva covers the whole of Montenegro. The Archdiocese of Bar was originally formed as a diocese in the 10th century when it split off from the Archdiocese of Split-Makarska, it subsequently became an Archdiocese in 1034.

The current building served as a cathedral between 1828 and 2017, when new Cathedral of Saint Peter the Apostle was consecrated.

== See also ==
- Catholic Church in Montenegro
