= Vicko Zmajević =

18th-century Catholic bishop

The Most Reverend Vicko Zmajević
- Archbishop of Zadar
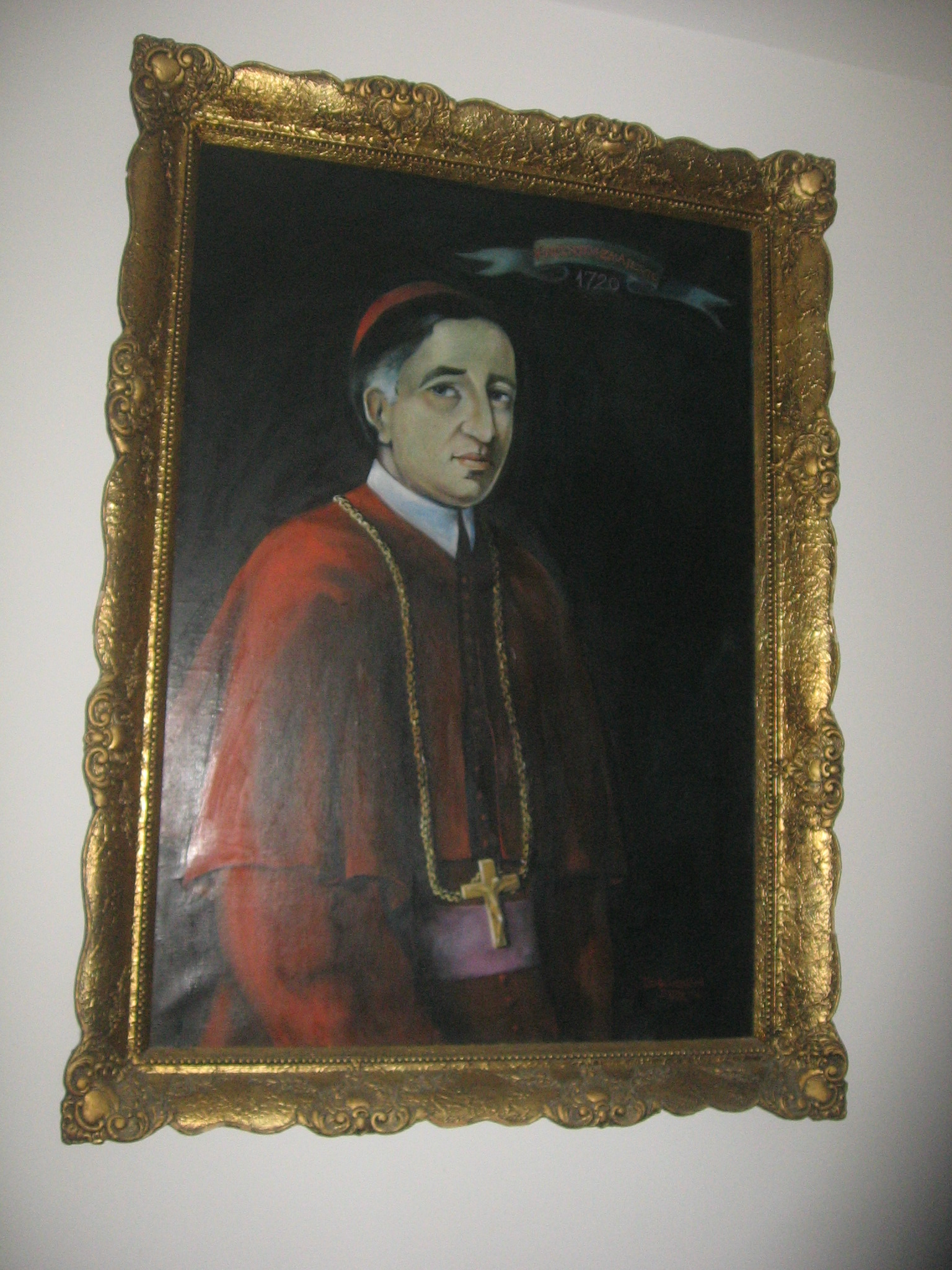
- Archbishop of Bar Vicko Zmajević; Picture oil on canvas 1720
- Archdiocese: Zadar
- See: Zadar
- Appointed: 22 May 1713
- Term ended: 21 December 1745
- Predecessor: Viktor Prioli
- Successor: Matej Karaman
- Other posts: Primate of Serbia, Archbishop of Bar (1701-1710); Apostolic Administrator of Budva (1701-1714); Apostolic visitor for countries under Ottoman rule (Serbia, Albania, Macedonia, Greece) (1701-1745); Apostolic visitor for Bosnia (1737-1745)

Orders
- Consecration: by Marino Drago

Personal details
- Born: Vicko Zamjević; 21 December 1670 Perast, Ottoman Empire (now Montenegro)
- Died: 12 September 1745 (aged 74) Zadar, Republic of Venice (now Croatia)
- Buried: Church of Our Lady of Health, Zadar
- Denomination: Roman Catholic

Styles of Vicko Zmajević
- Reference style: The Most Reverend
- Spoken style: Your Excellency
- Religious style: Archbishop

Vicko Zmajević (21 December 1670 – 12 September 1745) was a Roman Catholic prelate who served as Archbishop of Bar and Primate of Serbia and as the Archbishop of Zadar.

== Biography ==
Zmajević was born in Perast, at the time part of the Venetian Albania, into the House of Zmajević, one of the most influential families in the region. He was appointed Archbishop of Bar, at the time in the Ottoman Empire, on 18 April 1701. He was appointed Apostolic Administrator of the Diocese of Budua (under the Republic of Venice) on 24 December 1701.

At the Bar church fair in 1702, Zmajević had the title of Diocleciensis, totius regni Serviae primas, visitator Albanie. He was consecrated as bishop by Marino Drago, bishop of Kotor.

In 1706, because unsafe life conditions, he moved back to Perast. In 1710, he moved to Kotor.

Zmajević became the archbishop of Zadar (in Venetian Dalmatia) on 22 May 1713. He resigned as Apostolic Administrator of Budva in 1714. He would also be reappointed Archbishop of Bar on 12 August 1713. He died in Zadar.

== Legacy ==
The Croatian Encyclopedia describes him as a 'Croatian church politician and writer' and notes that his few remaining works are archived by HAZU.

== See also ==
- Matija Zmajević
- Krsto Zmajević
- Andrija Zmajević
- Marko Ivanovich Voinovich

== Notes ==
- Cheney, David M. "Archdiocese of Zadar (Zara)". Catholic-Hierarchy.org. (for Chronology of Bishops) ^{[self-published]}
- Chow, Gabriel. "Archdiocese of Zadar (Croatia)". GCatholic.org. (for Chronology of Bishops) ^{[self-published]}

Preceded by Viktor Prioli	Archbishop of Zadar; 1713-1745	Succeeded by Matej Karaman
