= Matija Zmajević =

Admiral of the Russian Baltic Fleet (1680–1735)

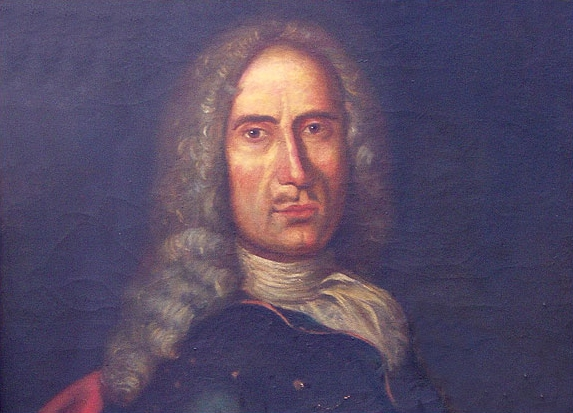
- Portrait by an unknown painter
- Native name: Матвей Змаевич
- Born: January 6, 1680; Perast, Republic of Venice
- Died: August 23, 1735 (aged 55) Tavrov, Russian Empire
- Allegiance: Russia
- Branch: Imperial Russian Navy
- Rank: Admiral
- Conflicts: Great Northern War; Battle of Gangut

Matija Zmajević (also Matej Zmajević; Russian: Матвей Христофорович Змаевич, romanized: Matvey Khristoforovich Zmayevich; January 6, 1680 – August 23, 1735) was an admiral of the Russian Baltic Fleet. He was also a shipbuilder for Peter I of Russia, building a fleet in Voronezh.

== Early life ==
He was born in Perast in 1680, at the time located in Venetian Albania, now in Montenegro. His uncle, Andrija Zmajević, was an archbishop of Roman Catholic Archdiocese of Bar and a poet. He was also a primate of Serbia. The family was in conflict with the Bujović family, another family from Perast. After Vicko Bujović was killed, Zmajević left Perast as he was accused of being involved in his death. He escaped to the Republic of Ragusa, and then to Constantinople, where he found refuge with Russian ambassador Peter Tolstoy. Zmajević had known Tolstoy since a 1698 training trip the latter took to Perast. In 1712, Tolstoy sent him with a recommendation to Peter I of Russia.

== Military career ==
Impressed with Zmajević's education and maritime skills, the tsar accepted him into military service and sent him to Saint Petersburg, where he became commodore captain and further rose in rank.

Zmajević had great success in maritime battles against Sweden, against whom Russia fought the Great Northern War for supremacy in the Baltic Sea. In 1714, as head of the tsar's Baltic fleet, he achieved a victory in the Battle of Gangut for which he received the war flag of the Russian fleet. In 1719, he was promoted to rear admiral and his fleet won the last naval battle of the Great Northern War, forcing the Swedes to sign the Treaty of Nystad.

He was subsequently promoted to the rank of vice admiral and put in charge for building the river fleet of the Don. In 1725, he was given the honor of carrying the emperor's crown at the funeral of Peter the Great. The tsar's successor, Catherine I, decorated Zmajević with the Order of Alexander Nevsky. In 1727, he was awarded the ultimate rank of admiral.

After the death of Catherine I in 1727, Zmajević was accused of embezzlement and sentenced to death by a court-martial. He was reprieved at the last minute and relegated to the post of governor of the Astrakhan area with the rank of vice-admiral, where he spent last years of his life. He worked on establishment of the Black Sea Fleet, which would play a significant role in Russian expansion to the south after his death.

Zmajević made numerous donations to his hometown Perast and Bay of Kotor. He was buried with military honors in the Catholic Church of Saint Ludvig in Moscow.

== Legacy ==
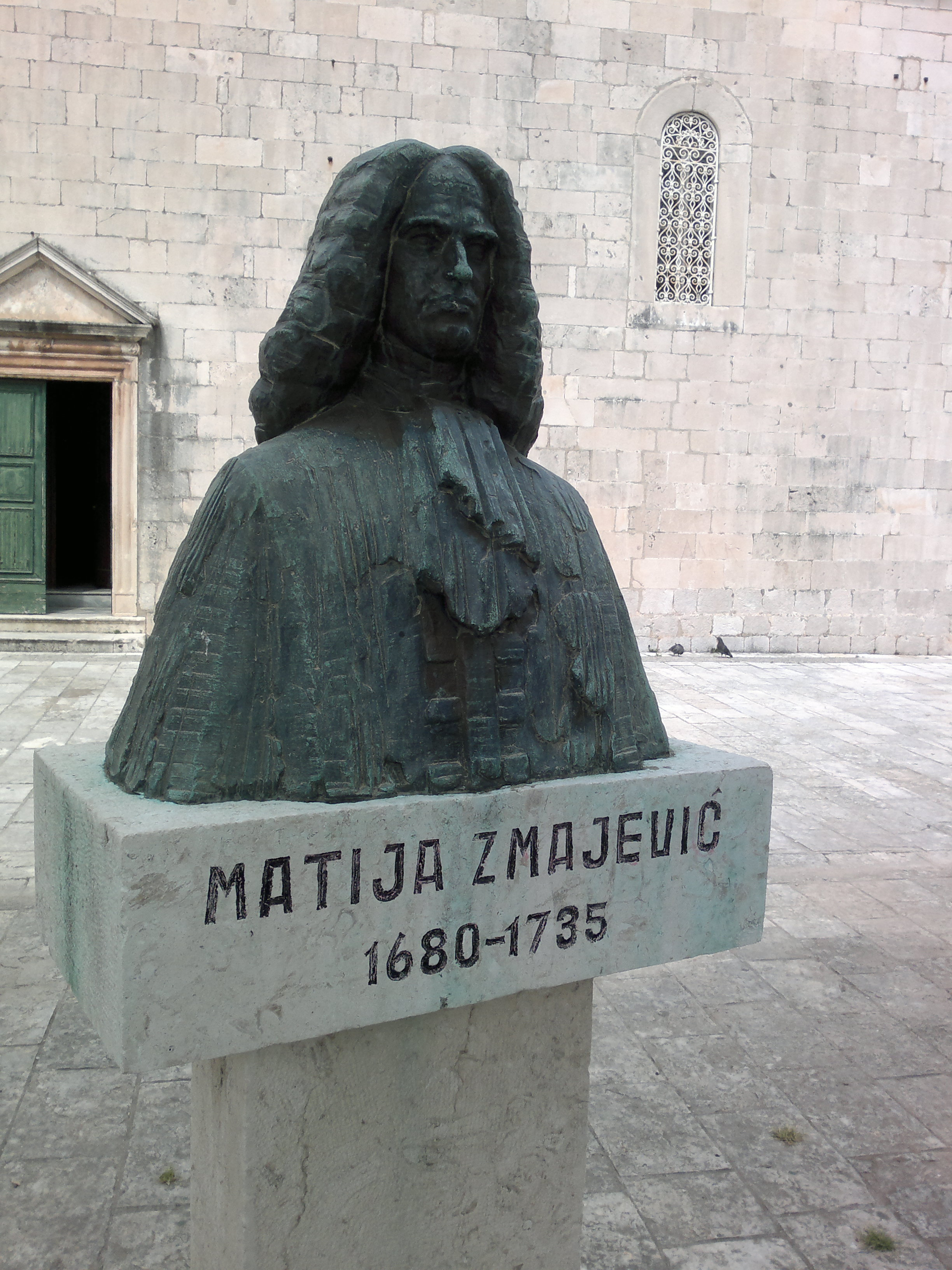
Bust of Matija Zmajević in Perast, Montenegro

The Croatian Encyclopedia describes him as a "Croatian sailor and Russian admiral". He was depicted on a Montenegrin stamp in 2012.

== See also ==
- Krsto Zmajević
- Marko Ivanovich Voinovich
- Vicko Zmajević
- Marko Ivelich
- Nikolai Kuznetsov
- Nikolai Dimitrievich Dabić

== Sources ==
- "Змаевич, Матвей Христофорович" . Brockhaus and Efron Encyclopedic Dictionary (in Russian). 1906.
- Babić, Vanda (2016). "Zmajevići – prilog kulturnoj povijesti Mediterana" [Zmajević family – a contribution on cultural history of the Mediterranean] (PDF). Istorijski Zapisi (in Croatian). 89 (3–4). University of Montenegro: 287–303. ISSN 0021-2652.
- Roberts, Elizabeth (2007). Realm of the Black Mountain: A History of Montenegro. London: Hurst & Company. ISBN 978-1-85065-868-9.
