= Giorgio Giunchi =

Giorgio Giunchi (Latin: Georgius Giunchi, Albanian: Gjergj Junki; 1717–1787) was an Albanian Catholic prelate. Giunchi was born in Livari, in Antivari (modern Bar, in Montenegro) ecclesiastically part of the Diocese of Antivari, on 20 February 1717. After studying in Rome for two years he returned in his home region as parish priest of Zuppa near Antivari. In 1757 he was ordained as Bishop of Pult. From 1765 to 1786, when he became Archbishop of the Roman Catholic Archdiocese of Bar, he served as Bishop of Lezhë. Giunchi died on 26 January 1786 in Livari, where he was also buried. Giorgio Radovani, his successor, was the clergyman who preached in his funeral service.
