= Lovreć =

Municipality in Split-Dalmatia County, Croatia

- Location within Croatia
- Coordinates: 43°30′N 17°00′E
- Country: Croatia
- Region: Dalmatian Hinterland
- County: Split-Dalmatia County

Area
  - Total: 105.2 km^{2} (40.6 sq mi)

Population (2021)
  - Total: 1,402
  - Density: 13.33/km^{2} (34.52/sq mi)
- Time zone: UTC+1 (CET)
  - Summer (DST): UTC+2 (CEST)
- Website: lovrec.hr

Lovreć is a village and a municipality in Croatia in the Split-Dalmatia County.

== History ==
On 17 August 2021, a tornado of intensity IF0.5 hit Čajkušići by Lovreć, causing roof damage.

== Demographics ==
In the 2011 census, it had a total population of 1,699, in the following settlements:

- Dobrinče, population 174
- Lovreć, population 585
- Medovdolac, population 163
- Opanci, population 321
- Studenci, population 456

In the same census, 99.59% of the population were Croats.

The hamlets near Lovreć include: Olujići, Dumančići and Kasumi, Šimundići, Čaljkušići, Bekavci, Milinovići, Nosići, Jelići, Petričevići, Nikolići, Ćorići.

Lovreć: Population trends 1857–2021
v

population	3591	3955	4398	5059	5704	6564	6618	6147	6573	6199	6099	6041	4432	3590	2500	1699	1402
	1857	1869	1880	1890	1900	1910	1921	1931	1948	1953	1961	1971	1981	1991	2001	2011	2021

Sources: Croatian Bureau of Statistics publications

== Famous people ==
- Šimun Milinović
