= Ambroz Antun Kapić =

Archbishop of Antivari

Ambroz Antun Kapić (Capitius, Capizzi, Kapizzi; 1529–1598) was a Franciscan priest who served as an archbishop of Antivari (Bar) in the late 16th century.

Originally from Osor on the island of Cres (present-day Croatia), Pope Gregory XIII appointed Kapić as the archbishop of Antivari on 9 January 1579. The Pope also gave him administration over the Bishopric of Budva.

Because the Turks ravaged the archbishopric palace and estate, Kapić resided in Budva. However, he was not restricted access from Bar, where he would sometimes carry out church service.

Kapić was the last archbishop of Antivari to hold mass in the Cathedral of St. George, which was later turned into a mosque.

On several occasions, Kapić travelled to Venice and Rome to obtain aid for his archbishopric. After delivering an anti-Ottoman sermon in Bar in or after 1585, he was arrested and mistreated by the Ottoman authorities. After his release, he was forbidden from returning to Bar.

Kapić died in Budva on 31 August 1598.

== Sources ==
- Čoralić, Lovorka (2012). "Hrvatski iseljenici u Mlecima, crkva s. Sepolcro i barski nadbiskup Ambroz Antun Kapić (16. st.)" (PDF). Croatica Christiana Periodica (in Croatian). 36 (69): 1–9.
