= Andrea Suma =

Albanian Roman Catholic bishop (14th century–15th century)

Andrea Suma (13?? – 14??) was an Albanian prelate of the Roman Catholic Church.

== Life ==
A member of the noble Suma family he was born in Shkodër during the second half of the 14th century. In 1405 he was ordained as bishop of the Diocese of Lezhë, a post in which he served until 1426, when he became Bishop of Arbanum. After the establishment of the League of Lezhë he became an ambassador of Skanderbeg and the representative of the Roman Curia in Albania.

Suma is also the League's first treasurer to be recorded in historical documents. As such in March 1452 he received 4893 ducats from representatives of Nicholas V in Ragusa as part of the papal aid during the Ottoman-Albanian wars.
