= Lawrence III, Archbishop of Antivari =

Lawrence III (Serbian: Lovro III, Italian: Lorenzo III) served as an archbishop of Antivari in the early 16th century. In his capacity as the Bishop of Ulcinium, he participated in the Fifth Council of the Lateran in 1514. In 11 of September 1517, Pope Leo X raised Lawrence to the rank of Archbishop of Antivari, giving him also control over the Bishopric of Ulcinium.

In 1518, the Pope united the Bishopric of Budua with the Archbishopric of Antivari. However, it was not long until he revoked his act and gave Budua a bishop, Simon (Šimun), possibly a brother or close relative of Lawrence's.

Sometime between 1523 and 1525, Lawrence resigned as Archbishop of Antivari and Bishop of Ulcinium.
