= Diocese of Lezhë =

Roman Catholic diocese in Albania

Coordinates: 41.7778°N 19.6478°E

Diocese of Lezhë Dioecesis Alexiensis Dioqeza e Lezhës

Catholic
- Coat of arms

Location
- Country: Albania
- Metropolitan: Shkodër–Pult

Statistics
- Area: 750 km^{2} (290 sq mi)
- Population: Total; Catholics: (as of 2013); 121,700; 86,300 (70.9%)

Information
- Sui iuris church: Latin Church
- Rite: Latin Rite
- Established: 14th Century
- Cathedral: Cathedral of St. Nicholas

Current leadership
- Pope: Leo XIV
- Bishop: Ottavio Vitale, R.C.J.
- Metropolitan Archbishop: Angelo Massafra

Map
- Diocese of Lezhë

The Diocese of Lezhë (Albanian: Dioqeza e Lezhës, Latin: Dioecesis Alexiensis) is a Latin Church diocese of the Catholic Church located in the city of Lezhë in the ecclesiastical province of Shkodër–Pult in Albania.

== History ==
- 1400: Established as Diocese of Lezhë

== Ordinaries ==
- Bishops of Lezhë (Roman rite)
  - Bishop Ottavio Vitale, R.C.J. (2005.11.23 – Present)
  - Fr. Ottavio Vitale, R.C.J. (Apostolic Administrator 2000.02.05 – 2005.11.23)
  - Bishop Françesk Gjini (1946.01.04 – 1949)
  - Bishop Luigj Bumçi (1911.09.18 – 1943)
  - Bishop Leonard Stefan Deda, O.F.M. (1908.04.21 – 1910.10.08)
  - Bishop Francesco Malczynski (1870.05.24 – 1908)
  - Bishop Paolo Dodmassei (1858.05.02 – ?)
  - Archbishop Luigi Ciurcia, O.F.M. (1853.09.27 – 1858.06.04)
  - Bishop Gabriele Barissich Bosniese, O.F.M. (1826.09.19 – ?)
  - Bishop Nikollë Malci (1797–1826)
  - Bishop Mëhill Kryezezi (1786–1797)
  - Bishop Gjergj Junki (1765–1786)
  - Bishop Anton Kryezezi, O.F.M. (1750–1765)
  - Bishop Pal Kampsi (1748–1750)
  - Bishop Simon Negri (1739–148)
  - Bishop Gjon Gallata (1728–1739)
  - Bishop Ludwik Zaluski (1692–1699)
  - Bishop Gjergj Vladanji (1656–1692)
  - Bishop Benedict Orsini, O.F.M. (1621–1654)
  - Bishop Innocent Stoicini, O.S.B. (1596–1620)
  - Bishop Marin Braiani, O.F.M. (1578.10.15 – 1596)
  - Bishop Fernando Rojas, O. de M. (1519.11.19 – ?)
  - Bishop Blasius Vramay, O.P. (1467.06.01 – 1498)
  - Bishop Pierre Sarda de Pirano, O.F.M. (1426.11.27 – ?)
  - Bishop Andrea Suma (1405–1426)

== See also ==
- Roman Catholicism in Albania
- List of Roman Catholic dioceses in Albania

== Sources ==
- GCatholic.org
- Catholic Hierarchy
