= Šimun Milinović =

Croatian Roman Catholic priest

Šimun Milinović (24 February 1835 in Lovreć – 24 March 1910 in Bar) was a Croatian Roman Catholic priest and Franciscan who was the Serbian Primate (Primas Serbiae) and Archbishop of Antivari from 1886 to 1910.

Milinović was Croat by nationality, born in village Lovreć in southern Croatia (in the province Dalmatia), part of the Austrian Empire. He was ordained a priest on April 11, 1859. In 1862 he went to the imperial capital Vienna, where he continued his studies in history, geography and slavistics. He returned to Sinj in 1865, where he worked as teacher in gymnasium.

In 1886, he was named archbishop of Bar in Montenegro by Pope Leo XIII. In 1902 he requested a reconfirmation of the title "Serbian Primate" from the Pope, which was formally granted to him. He served in this position until his death in 1910.

== Works ==
- Hrvatske uspomene iz Dalmacije

== Sources ==
- "Milinović, Šimun". Croatian Encyclopedia (in Croatian). Miroslav Krleža Institute of Lexicography.
