= Lodovico Chieregati =

Lodovico Chieregati (or Chieregato, Chierepati; died on 4 June 1573 in Vicenza, Republic of Venice) was an Italian missionary who served as an Archbishop of Antivari (Bar) in the mid-16th century.

== Biography ==
Descended from an aristocratic family, several of Chieregati's relatives are recorded as prelates in several Dalmatian dioceses. These include: Leonelo Chieregati, Bishop of Rab and Trogir; and Giovanni Chieregati, Bishop of Kotor.

Originally from Vicenza, Pope Clement VII appointed Chieregati as Archbishop of Antivari on 11 May 1528. However, during Chieregati's pontificate in Antivari, he did not reside within the city.

From 1530, Chieregati served as an administrator of the Diocese of Narnia. Because of his absence, the administration of the Archdiocese of Antivari was entrusted to Jacob, Bishop of Budua (and Bishop of Ulcinium). Dalmas had caused a stir within Ulcinium when he attempted to introduce "new" families into the small group of Ulcinium's aristocracy. On 29 July 1549, a letter arose written to the Venetian Inquisition by Chieregati from Vincenza. In it, he describes his support for the actions performed by his vicar in Antivari, although Chieregati never explicitly stated who his vicar was. In the letter, he also accused some of the clerics in Ulcinium of being inclined towards Protestantism, therefore labeling them as heretics.

In 1541, Chieregati relocated to Antivari, formally regaining the administration of the archdiocese. Upon his relocation, he also illegally (not mandated by the Holy See) acted as the bishop of Budua. In 1546, he attended the Council of Trent where he requested the presence of his suffragans.

In 1551, Chieregati attended the Council of Trent once more, where he submitted his resignation as Archbishop.

Chieregati died in his hometown in 1573.
