= Giovanni Bona de Boliris =

16th-century writer and poet

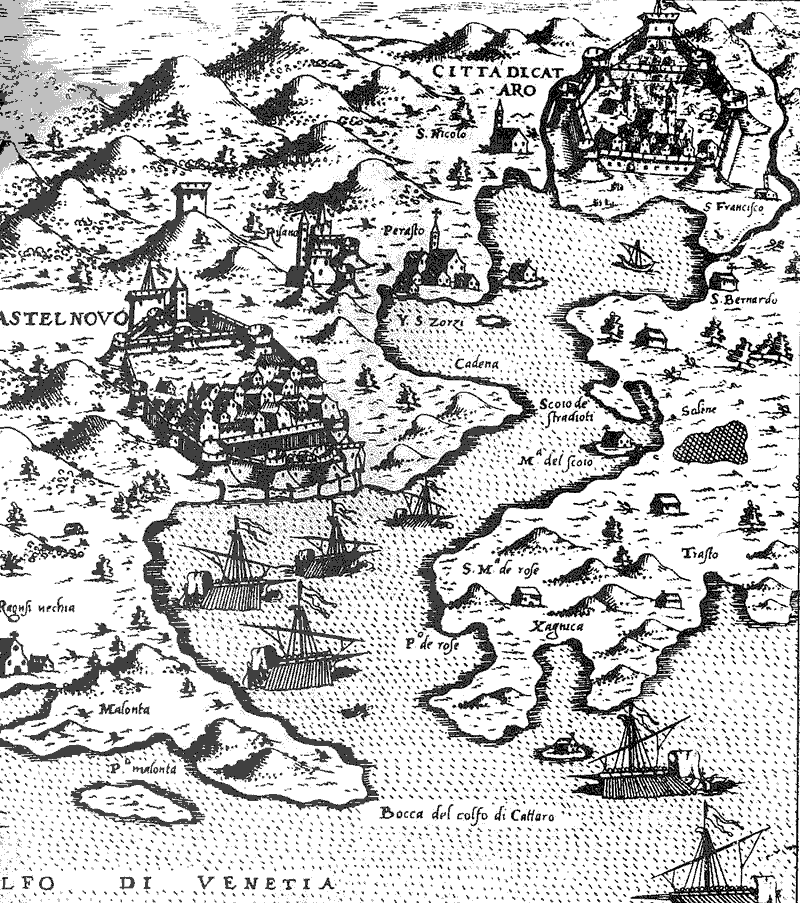
Old map of Venetian Cattaro (actual Kotor), when Giovanni Bona de Boliris wrote poems on the city

Giovanni Bona de Boliris (c. 1520 – c. 1572) was an Italian humanist poet and writer, who wrote in Latin and Italian.

== Life ==
Boliris was born in Cattaro (Kotor), in what was then called Albania Veneta (today Kotor, Montenegro). He studied law at the University of Padua.

In 1551 moved to live in the Kingdom of Naples, where he participated with Renaissance poets to create a volume - written in Italian - in honour of Giovanna d'Aragona, Dukess of Paliano.

He died in Cattaro. In 1585, 13 years after his death, a poem of his in Latin in honour of Cattaro, which he had written while living in Tuscany, was published.

== Works ==
He signed his Italian and Latin poems as Giovanni Bona, Johannes Bona and Ioannes Bonna.

The most famous work of Giovanni Bona is "Descriptio sinus et urbis Ascriviensis (for D. Ioannem Bonam de Boliris, nobilem Catharensem)" ("Description of the Gulf and City of Cattaro" (by Mr Giovanni Bona de Boliris, noble of Cattaro)) a poem of 331 Latin exameters with which he glorified the Bocche di Cattaro, Cattaro itself and the other localities of the fairy Gulf in the present-day Montenegro.

The work was published in Lucca, in Tuscany, in 1585 by the Ragusan Dominican friar Serafino Razzi, in the appendix to his "Storia di Raugia" (Ragusa) ("History of Raugia").

Bona de Boliris kept close relations with the literary circles in Italy, particularly with the poets gathered around the court of Naples.

When Girolamo Ruscelli, in 1551, collected poetic texts for an anthology in honour of Giovanna d'Aragona, Dukess of Paliano, the beautiful Neapolitan wife of Ascanio Colonna (member of the famous Colonna family), he invited to write also Bona de Boliris of Cattaro who, joining the initiative, was present in the volume published in Venice in 1554 with the title "Il tempio della divina signora donna Giovanna d'Aragona, fabbricato da tutti i più gentili spiriti e in tutte le lingue principali del mondo" ("The Temple of the Divine Lady Mrs. Giovanna d'Aragona, Made by the Most Gentle Spirits and in All the Principal Languages of the World").

== Dispute ==
There is a current dispute whether Giovanni Bona-Boliris belongs to the Italian, Montenegrin or Croatian literature. His works were written in Italian sonnet format and in Latin.

Thus, with very few exceptions, the Montenegrin and Croatian historians insert this writer in their national literatures changing his name respectively into "Ivan Bunić" and "Ivan Bolica". Bona was inserted (translated), at first in the anthologies of the "Croatian Latinists" of 1969 and then in the Montenegrin Anthology of 1979.

Thus he had entered the first Italian anthology already in 1555, four centuries earlier. Bona entered the book about the Dukess of Paliano, not with poems in Montenegrin or Croatian, but with an Italian sonnet and a Latin epigram, signing "Giovanni Bona da [from] Cattaro".

== Bibliography ==
- Gelcich, Giuseppe. Memorie storiche sulle bocche di Cattaro. Zara, 1880.
- Paulucci, Luigi. Le Bocche di Cattaro nel 1810. Edizioni Italo Svevo. Trieste, 2005.
- Randi, Oscar. Dalmazia etnica, incontri e fusioni. Tipografie venete. Venezia, 1990.
- Rheubottom, David. Age, Marriage, and Politics in Fifteenth-Century Ragusa. Oxford University Press, Oxford, 2000. ISBN 0-19-823412-0
