= Nikola Dobrečić =

Roman Catholic archbishop (1872–1955)

Nikola Dobrečić (Serbian Cyrillic: Никола Добречић; 28 January 1872 – 14 November 1955) was a Roman Catholic priest, Archbishop of Bar and Primate of Serbia, restorer of the Roman Catholic Church in Montenegro, reformer, poet, philanthropist, theologian and philosopher, founder of the archbishop's residence in Bar.

== Early life ==
Dobrečić was born in Bar, at the time part of the Ottoman Empire (now Montenegro). His family hailed from Livari (formerly Livor), a village in Skadarska Krajina. He had a brother, Filip, a later consul. While Dobrečić was in primary school, Montenegro achieved its independence as the Kingdom of Montenegro, and he then attended a Serbian national school. Despite completing his first year with very good marks, he had to repeat the class as he was too young to be accepted in advanced classes.

In 1890, Dobrečić was sent by his parents to Rome, where he attended the Pontifical Roman Seminary. He successfully completed a doctorate in theology, followed by one in philosophy. He was ordained as a Catholic priest in the Basilica of St. John Lateran in 1898. He returned to his homeland in 1899 and served the church in various roles until in 1905 he was appointed as a parish priest in Cetinje, the capital of Montenegro at the time. While serving there, he taught elementary school and began his career in government and business affairs working as a stenographer for the Montenegrin National Assembly.

From 1907 to 1913, he was a teacher at the Cetinje Gymnasium. He taught French.

== Office ==
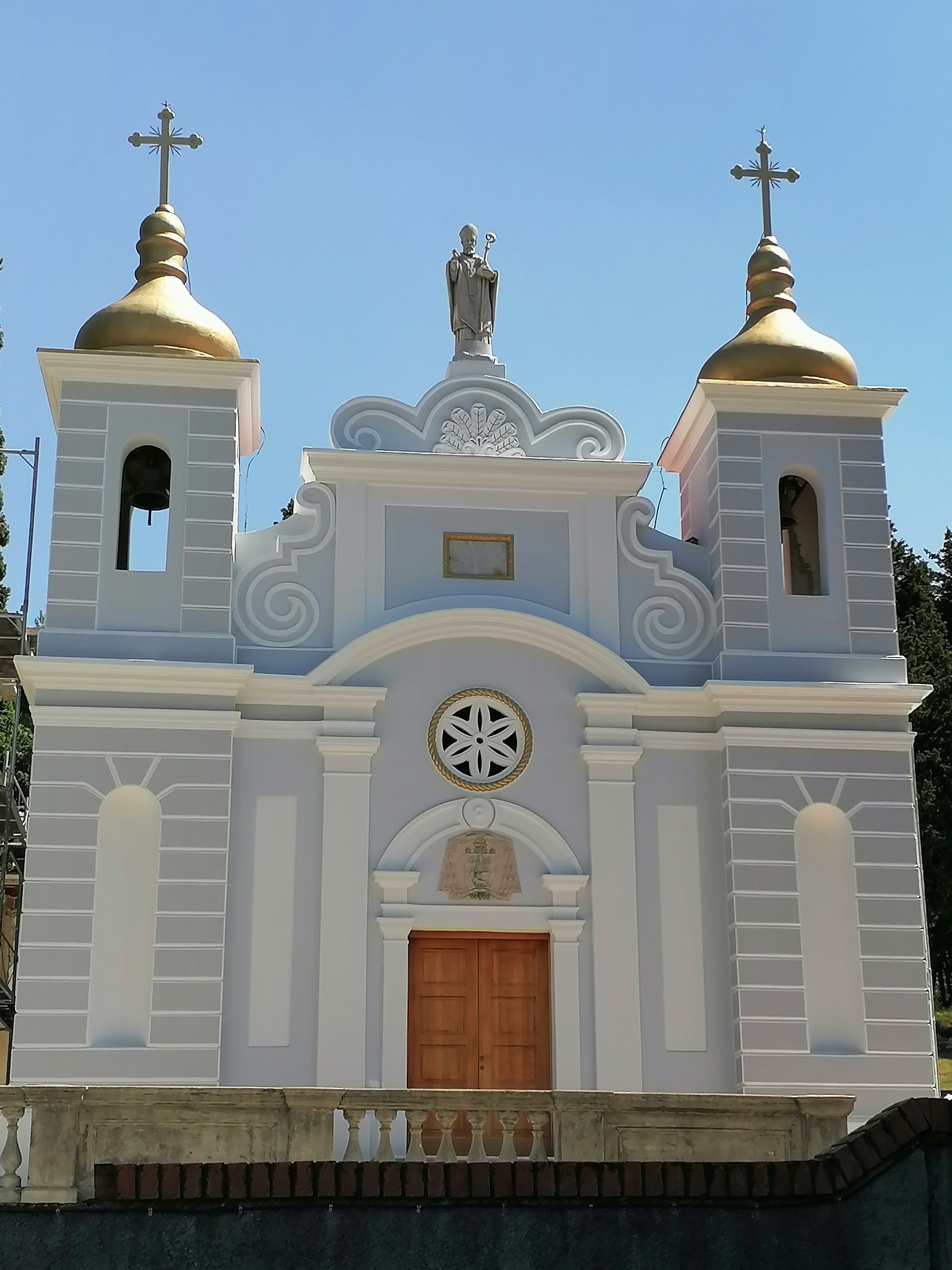
Church of St. Nicholas, Bar

Following the death of the incumbent, Simon Milinović, in 1910, the Roman Curia chose Dobrečić as the new Archbishop of Bar and Primate of Serbia, and he received his appointment in 1912. As head of the Roman Catholic Church in Montenegro, he regularly represented it in the parliament of the Kingdom of Montenegro and worked closely with the Montenegrin government and the king, until the fall of the monarchy and the occupation by the Central Powers during the First World War. The First World War was the first instance when he showed his Serbian-Montenegrin patriotism, through written moral support of Chetnik activities in the resistance.

In 1918, he was a supporter of the union between Montenegro and Serbia. He supported, and welcomed in the name of the Roman Catholic community, the decision of the Great National Assembly of Serbian People in Montenegro, which overthrew the reigning Petrovic dynasty and declared unconditional unification with Serbia under the Karađorđević dynasty. In 1919, the name of the unified country was officially the Kingdom of Serbs, Croats and Slovenians. Dobrečić went to the Holy See, where he successfully gained recognition for the newly created state, despite a note of protest from the self-proclaimed Montenegrin government-in-exile in France under the leadership of King Nicholas.

In 1922, he sought to move the archbishopric to Belgrade, and travelled to Rome to gain support. The Yugoslav government supported him.

In 1923, he was the candidate proposed by Prime Minister Nikola Pasic for the new Archbishop of Belgrade, but he did not receive the appointment. On 23 October 1923, he was hosted for lunch in Bar by King Alexander Karađorđević, which demonstrates that he was on good terms with the ruling dynasty.

In 1927, at Dobrečić's direction an archbishop palace was built which remains the residence of the Archbishop of Bar and Primate of Serbia to this day, and which was the seat of the cultural life of the city of Bar in his day, hosting such notables as the choral society "Bratimstvo". Archbishop Dobrečić financially assisted other national and educational associations such as the National Defense volunteers, the Adriatic Guard, and women's charities.

During the interwar period Nikola Dobrečić traveled Europe and to the United States contacting émigrées and trying to arouse interest in investments in Montenegro. He worked for greater economic development of the Montenegrin part of the Yugoslav monarchy, and especially for that of his homeland, the Bar Coast. Among his several economic initiatives, perhaps the most famous was the construction of the Ford Motor Company factory in Bar. He was also responsible for the overall rise of the standard of living of clergy in his see. He pointed out the need for vigorous development of the eastern Adriatic coast, often comparing the "Croatian Riviera" with "completely abandoned Serbian coastline".

On 20 June 1935, Dobrečić opened the "Archbishop's and Primate's Serbian Seminary" at his residence, in order to improve education. This was in addition to an early form of kindergarten, when his residence included, for a time, an orphanage for abandoned children from the coastal region of Bar. However, in 1939 he turned down the idea of a Catholic Seminary in Bar that would serve a larger population outside of his see.

When in 1941 the country fell under the occupation of the Axis powers in World War II, Dobrečić supported the resistance despite great pressure from the Italian fascists. Immediately after the war, Dobrečić condemned the so-called "Pastoral Letter" of Archbishop Stepinac. He felt that it was an attempt by Tito's regime to undermine the Roman Catholic Church. During an official visit to Zagreb, he died on 14 November 1955.

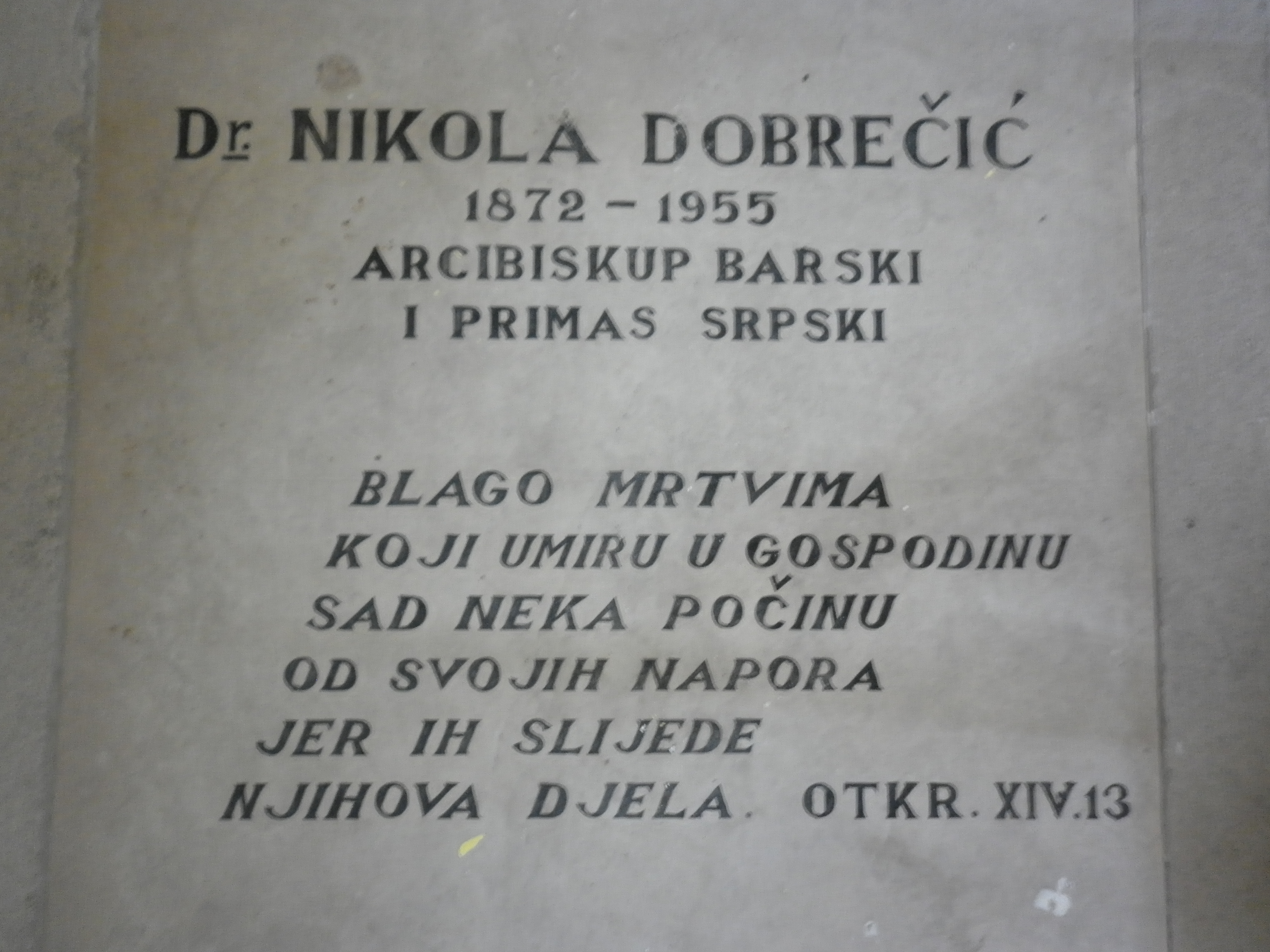
Inscription on Dobrečić's gravestone

== Legacy ==
In addition to his native Serbian, he knew eight other languages. Dobrečić wrote poems dedicated to Montenegrin and other Serbian statesmen and prelates, in Serbian, Latin, French and Italian. With local funds he built the church of St. Nicholas, which bears the motto of the archbishop: "For God and for his people."

== Political views ==
In the years before and after World War I, Dobrečić identified as a Serb and his clergy were Slavs. While opening the archbishopric residence in Bar in 1935, he held a speech in which he said that he "was and will always be the greatest friend of his people regardless of faith". He acted in the favour of Yugoslav radicalism, and was closest to the Yugoslav Radical Union.

== Works ==
He wrote in Serbian, Latin and Italian, and translated from and to French.

- Victor Hugo as a national and international poet (Виктор Иго као национални и интернационални пјесник), essay
- Jubilee songs, poetry collection

== Sources ==
- Kostić, Lazo M. (1963). Katolički Srbi: političko-istoriska rasprava. Srpski Kulturni Klub "Sveti Sava".
- Ljubomir Durković-Jakšić (1990). Srbija i Vatikan, 1804-1918. Srpska pravoslavna eparhija žička.
- Nedeljković, Saša (2011). Примасија Српска у Краљевини Југославији (in Serbian). Vidovdan.
- Nedeljković, Saša (2007). "Срби католици на Приморју од уједињења до Априлског рата" (PDF). Boka (27).
- Rastoder, Šerbo and Rastoder, Jasmina (1991) Dr Nikola Dobrečić, arcibiskup barski i primas srpski: 1872-1955: Život i djelo; Prilog izučavan ju istorije Barske arcibiskupije Budva Mediteran, OCLC 165353507, in Croatian
- Недељковић, С. 2011, "Serbs Catholics on the Southern Coast from 1918 till 1945", Boka, no. 31, pp. 127–170.
