= Andrew I, Archbishop of Antivari =

Andrew (Serbian: Andrija) served as an archbishop of Antivari in the early 14th century.

Pope Clement V appointed Andrew as Archbishop of Antivari in 1307. However, around this time, King Stephen Milutin began persecuting Catholics.

In 1319, he was prosecuted by the Holy See on three charges. These charges included using the false deposal of Albanian bishop Mihovil to install abbot Lazarus in his place, without the knowledge of Pope John XXII. Andrew was also accused of seizing the right to name the bishop of Drivast. Because of these accusations, the Pope ordered an ecclesiastical suspension to which Andrew voluntarily stepped down as Archbishop in 1324.

By one hypothesis, Andrew was the author of the Descriptio Europae Orientalis (1308), a geographical treatise on southeastern Europe composed for Charles, Count of Valois.
