= Toma Ursini =

16th–17th century archbishop

Toma Ursini (Latin: Ursinus; 1573–1606) served as the Archbishop of Antivari (now Bar in Montenegro) and Primate of Serbia in 1599–1606. He belonged to the Franciscan Order.

== Ancestry and birth ==
Ursini's ancestry and birth are uncertain. According to Vojislav Korać, Ursini belonged to the Medvedović family and was born in the Popovo Field in Herzegovina. According to Josip Turčinović he belonged to the Bastić and Medojević families and was born in Ravno in the Popovo Field.

== Church career ==
Ursioni studied theology at Sorbonne. He was also a historian. In 1556–59 he was a provincial in the Republic of Ragusa province. For some time he served as a bishop in Alessio (now Lezhë). Ursini was appointed Archbishop of Antivari in 1599. However, he resided in Budva as the Turks did not allow him access into the city of Antivari. Ursini constructed a Franciscan monastery in Paštrovići.

Ursini obtained a firman from Istanbul, stating that every Catholic household must give the Archbishopric two aspers annually. It also stated that Catholics must give twelve aspers for their first marriage, twenty-four for the second marriage and forty-eight for the third. The firman stated that every parish must also give a ducat annually.
