= Francesco Leonardi (missionary) =

Francesco Leonardi (Serbian: Franjo Leonardi, Albanian: Françesko Leonardi; died 1646) was a Papal missionary who served as Archbishop of Antivari in the mid-17th century.

== Biography ==
Leonardi was born in the Venetian city of Traú (today's Trogir, in Croatia), in Dalmatia. He finished his theological and philosophical studies in Rome, graduating with a doctorate.

Leonardi began as an episcopal vicar; however, due to his education and abilities, he became a delegate of the Congregation of Religious Propaganda under the Roman Curia. He received orders in 1636 to spread Catholicism throughout Dalmatia and the Bay of Cattaro. He was especially devoted to the conversion of the local Paštrović clan to Catholicism. In his report to the Congregation, he stated that the crossover of Montenegro to Catholicism is especially important in the spread of Catholicism in Serbia and the Balkans in general.

In 1638, Leonardi met with Mardarius, the Orthodox Metropolitan of Cetinje, to discuss his potential conversion to Catholicism. The duo met once more in 1639 in Cetinje, discussing Mardarius' conversion to Catholicism and his visiting Rome. Mardarius expressed his readiness in accepting the offer, also demanding that the Roman Curia allot the same wages as the bishops under the Ottoman Empire. However, because of his closeness with the Curia, the Ottoman Turks imprisoned Mardarius. Upon his release from prison in early 1640, he met with Leonardi in Maine and converted to Catholicism, acknowledging submission to the Pope.

Leonardi also met with Pajsije, the Patriarch of Peć, discussing his possible conversion to Catholicism.

In 1644, Pope Innocent X appointed Leonardi as the Archbishop of Antivari. However, during his tenure, Leonardi never visited his archbishopric nor its seat in Antivari.
