= Krsto Zmajević =

Captain and merchant in Perast, Republic of Venice

- Born: 21 May 1620; Perast, Republic of Venice (now Montenegro)
- Died: 1698 (aged 77–78)
- Other names: Krile
- Occupations: captain and merchant

Krsto Zmajević (May 21, 1620—fl. 1688), also known as Krile, was a captain and merchant in his home-town of Perast. He was the brother of Andrija Zmajević.

== Life ==
Zmajević was born in Perast, in the Bay of Kotor, at the time part of the Republic of Venice (now Montenegro) on 3 May 1640. The Zmajević family hailed from Njeguši; when the last members of the Crnojević family left Principality of Zeta, Nikola Zmajević and his cousins Ivaniš and Vučeta moved to Kotor. Becoming appealed and somewhat wealthy, the family quickly converted from Orthodoxy in favour of Roman Catholicism, with the three marrying Catholic girls and having their children baptized in the Latin Rite. Andrija's father was Nikola Milutin Zmajević. After Andrija's birth in 1628, soon came Andrija's brothers, Ivan and Krsto. Krsto Zmajević would become a very famous person, on more than one occasion as the Captain of Perast. Andrija remained very akin towards his family origin throughout his life.

In 1671 he was elected the town captain of Perast, entrusted with the military and administrative authority of the town.

In 1675, he was sent to expel the pirates in Ulcinj who had sacked throughout the Adriatic Sea, for which he was awarded a golden necklace by the Senate.

He became the caretaker of an Ottoman general's daughter, which later became the cause of the Zmajević-Bujović family feud.

In 1679 he was elected town captain for the second time, in a period when Perast saw an expansion in defence against the Ottomans and pirates.

His son, Vicko, was the later Archbishop of Zara. and the other son Matija became the admiral of the Russian Navy.
