= Archdiocese of Bar =

Catholic archdiocese in Montenegro

Coordinates: 42°05′41″N 19°07′51″E

Archdiocese of Bar Archidioecesis Antibarensis Барска надбискупија Barska Nadbiskupija Kryepeshkopata e Tivarit

Catholic
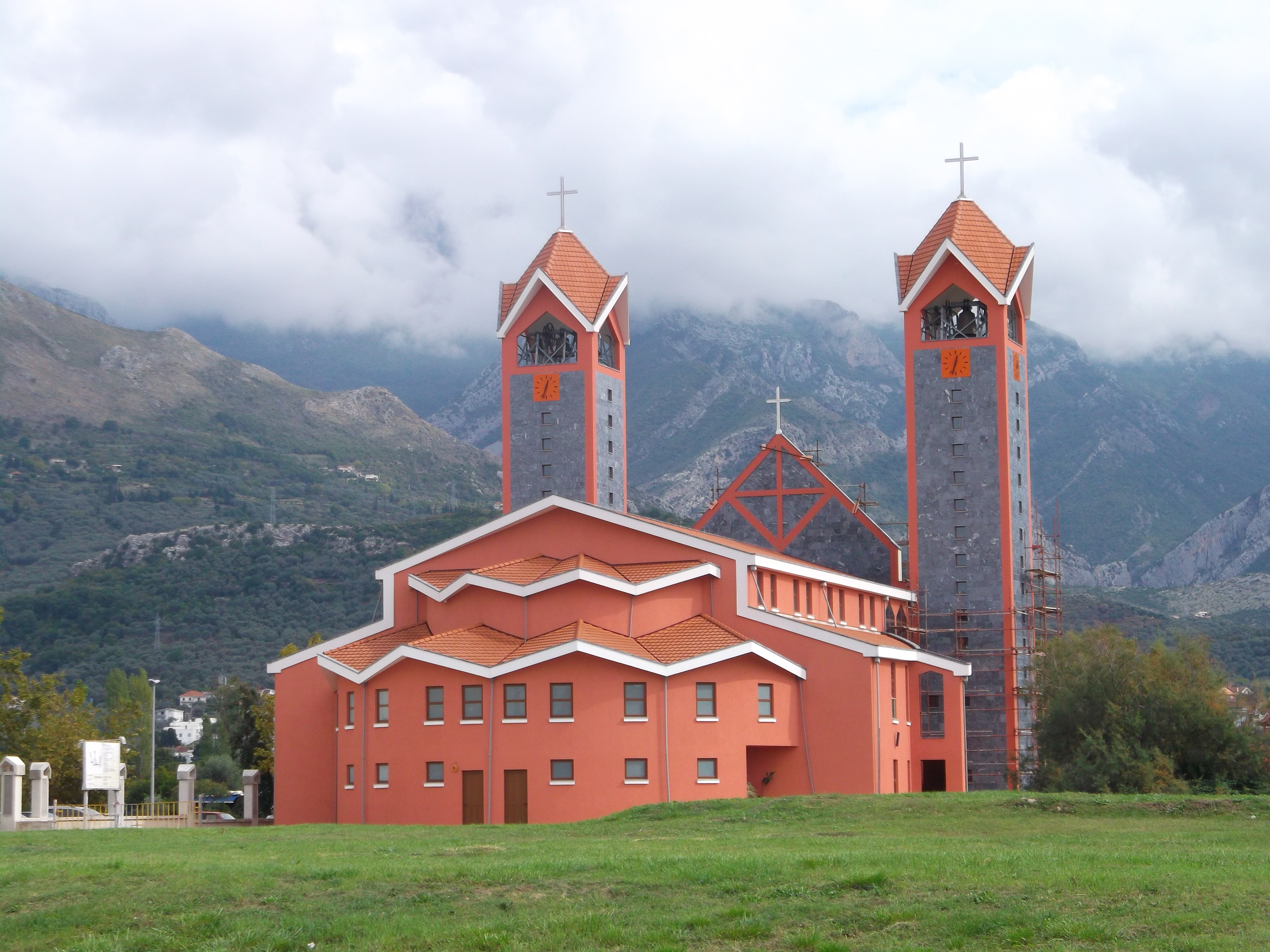
- Cathedral of Saint Peter (new cathedral)

Location
- Country: Montenegro
- Metropolitan: Immediately Subject to the Holy See

Statistics
- Area: 13,198 km^{2} (5,096 sq mi)
- Population: Total; Catholics: (as of 2012); 631,000; 11,227 (1.8%)
- Parishes: 19

Information
- Denomination: Catholic
- Sui iuris church: Latin Church
- Rite: Roman Rite
- Established: 1199
- Cathedral: Cathedral of the Immaculate Conception near Stari Bar
- Co-cathedral: Cathedral of Saint Peter the Apostle in Bar, Montenegro

Current leadership
- Pope: Leo XIV
- Metropolitan Archbishop: Rrok Gjonlleshaj

Map
- Map of Montenegro Diocese of Kotor Archdiocese of Bar

The Archdiocese of Bar (Note: Latin: Archidioecesis Antibarensis Montenegrin: Барска надбискупија, Barska nadbiskupija Albanian: Kryepeshkopata Katolike Romake e Tivarit) is a Latin Church diocese of the Catholic Church in Montenegro. It is centred in the city of Bar.

== History ==
The first data on the official recognition of the Bar Archbishopric by Rome date back to the end of the 12th century, during the reign of Serbian King Vukan Nemanjić. Entering into negotiations with Pope Innocent III, Vukan managed to secure official confirmation of the existence of the Bar Archbishopric in 1199.

In 1571 when Ottomans captured Antivari the Catholic Church in border area and Roman Catholic Archdiocese of Bar began to collapse and main reasons for this is emigration of indigenous peoples, but also immigration of new ethnic and religious element, brought by the Ottomans. Because of a lack of Catholic priests, entire parishes were converted to Orthodoxy.

The Archbishops regularly bore titles of "Primates of Serbia" (Primas Serviae), implemented as a permanent part of the title by Archbishop Stephen Tegliatti in 1475. The date when Archbishops of Bar got the title Primate of Serbia is unknown. It is established that since the 16th century they have been freely called Serbiae primas (Primate of Serbia) and totius regni Serviae primas (Primate of the entire Serbian Kingdom). At the request of the Archbishop of Bar, Milinović, Pope Leo XIII explicitly granted him permission to continue using that title on 7 March 1902.

In 1923, Traboin, Tuzi, Grude, and Klezna were added to the Archbishopric from the Roman Catholic Archdiocese of Shkodër.

In 1969, the territory of the municipalities of Plav, Gusinje, and Vojno Selo were added to the Archbishopric from the Roman Catholic Archdiocese of Skopje.

The archdiocese's new cathedral is the Cathedral of Saint Peter the Apostle (consecrated in September 2017) in Bar. Its old Cathedral of the Immaculate Conception is located near Stari Bar. Rrok Gjonlleshaj currently serves as archbishop in the archdiocese.

The social arm of the diocese, the "Humanitarian Organisation Caritas of the Archdiocese of Bar" (Montenegrin: Humanitarna organizacija Caritas Barske nadbiskupije) was registered as a charity in 2002. Today, it operates as a part of Caritas Montenegro.

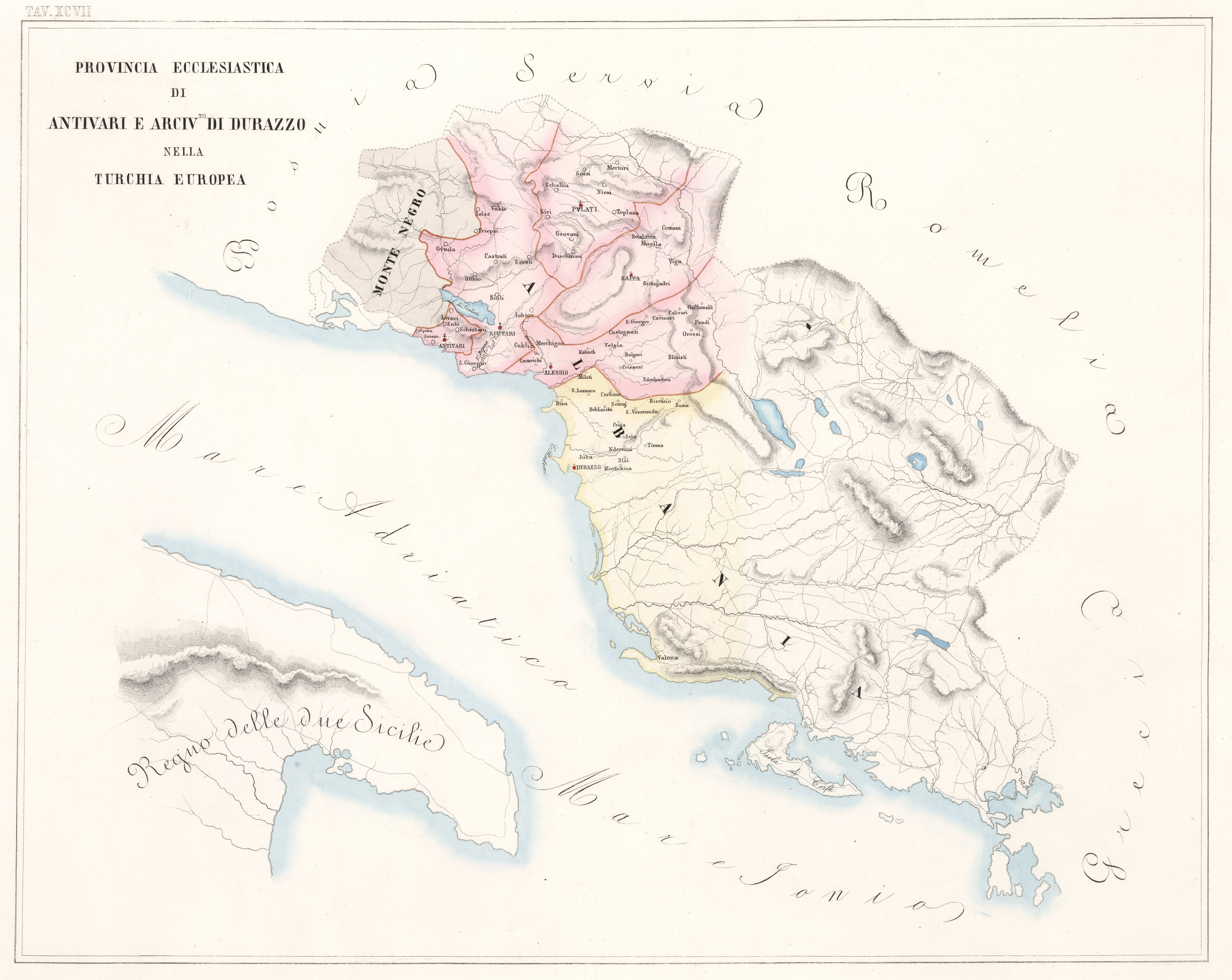
19th-century map of the ecclesiastic province of Antivari with its dioceses shaded in red, within the Ottoman Empire.

== Archbishops ==
- John I (1199–1247)
- John II (Giovanni da Pian del Carpine) (1248–1252)
- Gufrid (April 1253 – 1254)
- Lawrence I (1255–1270)
- Gašpar Adam (1270–1280)
- Michael (1282–1298)
- Rudger (1298–1301), member of the
  Cistercian order, writer
  of the Chronicle of the Priest of Dioclea
- Marinus I (Marin Petrov Žaretić) (1301–1306)
- Andrew I (1307–1324)
- William I (Guillaume Adam) (1324–1341)
- John III (1341–1347)
- Dominic (1349–1360)
- Stephen (1361–1363)
- John IV (1363–1373)
- John V (1373–1382)
- Anton (1383–1390)
- Raymond (1391–1395)
- Ludovik I (Ludovik Bonito) (1395)
- Marinus II (1396–1420)
- John VI (1420–1422)
- Peter II (1423–1448)
- Andrew II (1448–1459)
- Lawrence II (1459–1460)
- Mark I (1460–1461)
- Simon I (Šimun Vosić) (1462–1473)
- Stephen II (Stephen Teglatius) (1473–1485)
- Philip (Philip Gaius) (1485–1509)
- Jeronim (1509–1517)
- Lawrence III (1517–1525)
- John VII (1525?–1528?)
- Ludovik II (Lodovico Chieregati) (1528–1551)
- John VIII (1551–1571)
- Theodore (1575)
- Ambrosius (Ambrozije Kapić) (1579–1598)
- Thomas (Toma Ursini) (1598–1607)
- Marinus III (Marino Bizzi) (1608–1624)
- Peter III (Pjetër Mazreku) (1624–1634)
- George I (Gjergj Bardhi) (1635–1644)
- Francis I (Franjo Leonardi) (1644–1646)
- Joseph (Giuseppe Maria Bonaldi) (1646–1653)
- Mark II (Marco Crisio) (1654–1656)
- Andrew III (Andrija Zmajević) (1671–1694)
- Mark III (Marco Giorga) (1696–1700)
- Vincent I (Vićenco (Vicko) Zmajević) (1701–1713)
- Egidio Quinto (1719–1722?)
- Matthew (Matija Štukanović(?)) (1722–1744?)
- Mark IV (Marco de Luchi) (1745–1749)
- Lazarus I (Lazër Vladanji) (1749–1786)
- George II (Gjergj Junki) (1786–1787)
- George III (Gjergj Radovani) (1787–1790)
- Francis II (Francesco Borzi) (1791–1822)
- Vincent II (Vincenzo Battucci) (1824–1839)
- Charles (Karlo Poten) (1855–1886)
- Simon II (Šimun Milinović) (1886–1910)
- Nicholas (Nikola Dobrečić) (1912–1955)
- Alexander (Aleksandar Tokić) (1955–1979)
- Peter IV (Petar Perkolić) (1979–1997)
- Zef Gashi (1998–2016)
- Rrok Gjonlleshaj (5 April 2016 – )

== See also ==
- List of Roman Catholic dioceses in Montenegro

== Sources ==
- Dragojlović, Dragoljub (1990). "Dyrrachium et les Évéchés de Doclea jusqu'a la fondation de l'Archevéche de Bar" (PDF). Balcanica. 21: 201–209.
- Шишић, Фердо, ed. (1928). Летопис Попа Дукљанина (Chronicle of the Priest of Duklja). Београд-Загреб: Српска краљевска академија.
- Кунчер, Драгана (2009). Gesta Regum Sclavorum. Vol. 1. Београд-Никшић: Историјски институт, Манастир Острог.
- Живковић, Тибор (2009). Gesta Regum Sclavorum. Vol. 2. Београд-Никшић: Историјски институт, Манастир Острог.
