= Bay of Kotor =

Geographic region of Montenegro

Bay of Kotor Boka kotorska Бока которска
- Geographic region of Montenegro
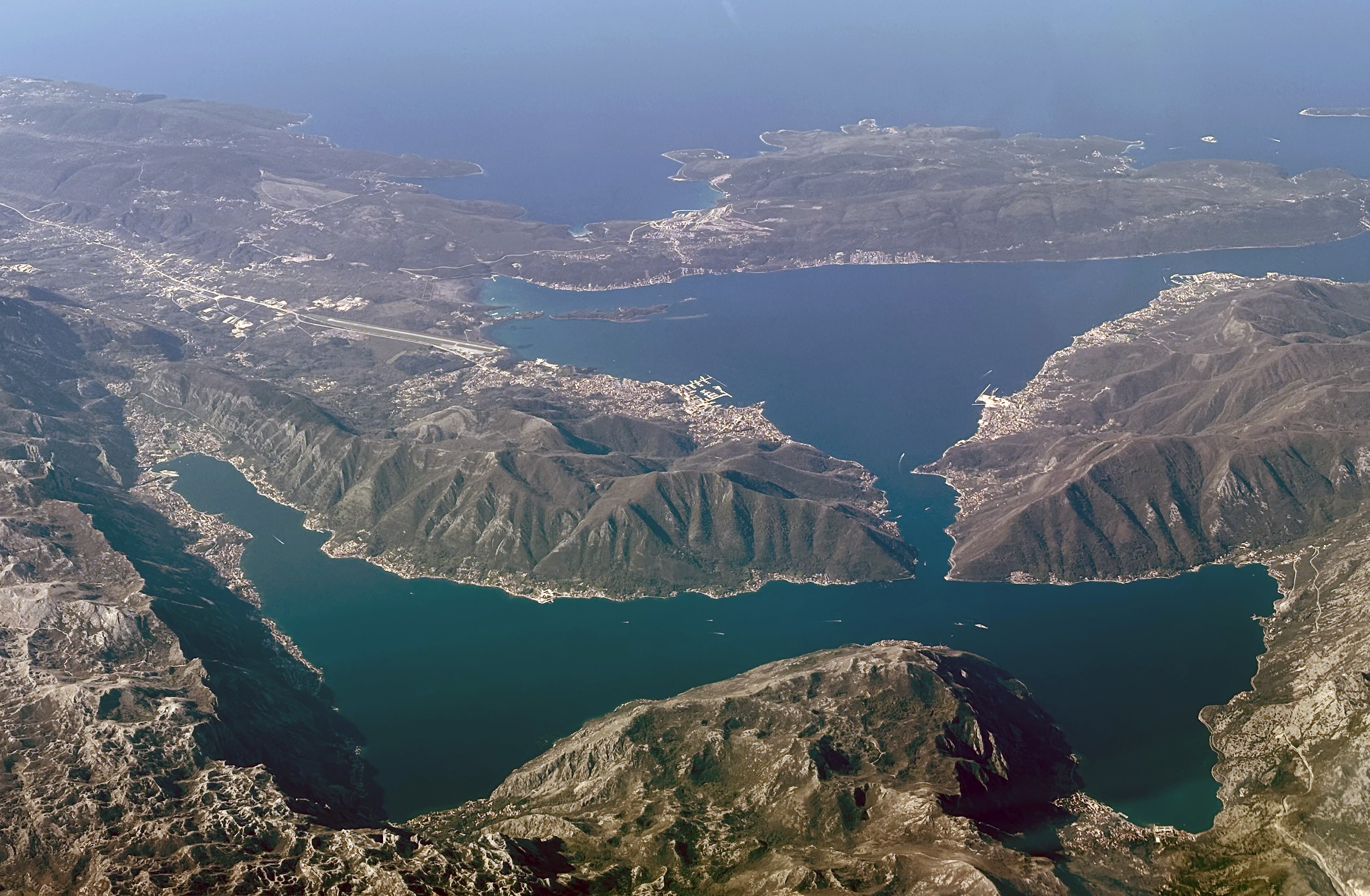
- Aerial view

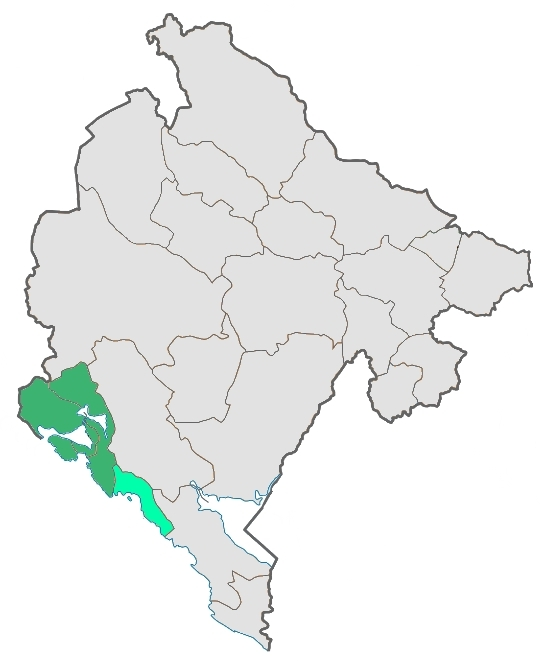
- Municipalities that form the Bay of Kotor region: Kotor, Herceg Novi and Tivat.
- Interactive map of Bay of Kotor
- Coordinates: 42.45°N 18.67°E
- Country: Montenegro; Croatia
- Historical region: Dalmatia
- Municipalities: Kotor, Herceg Novi, Tivat

Area
  - Total: 616 km^{2} (238 sq mi)

Population
  - Total: 69,908
- Demonym(s): Bokelj (masculine); Bokeljka (feminine)

UNESCO World Heritage Site
- Official name: Natural and Culturo-Historical Region of Kotor
- Criteria: Cultural: i, ii, iii, iv
- Reference: 125
- Inscription: 1979 (3rd Session)
- Area: 14,600 ha (36,000 acres)
- Buffer zone: 36,491 ha (90,170 acres)

The Bay of Kotor (Serbo-Croatian: Boka kotorska / Бока которска, Italian: Bocche di Cattaro), also known as the Gulf of Kotor or just as the Boka (Serbian Cyrillic: Бока), is a winding bay of the Adriatic Sea in southwestern Montenegro and the region of Montenegro concentrated around the bay. It is also the southernmost part of the historical region of Dalmatia. At the entrance to the Bay there is Prevlaka, a small peninsula in southern Croatia.

The bay has been inhabited since antiquity. Its well-preserved medieval towns of Kotor, Risan, Tivat, Perast, Prčanj and Herceg Novi, along with their natural surroundings, are major tourist attractions. The Natural and Culturo-Historical Region of Kotor was designated a UNESCO World Heritage Site in 1979. Its numerous Orthodox and Catholic churches and monasteries attract numerous religious pilgrims and other visitors.

== Geography ==
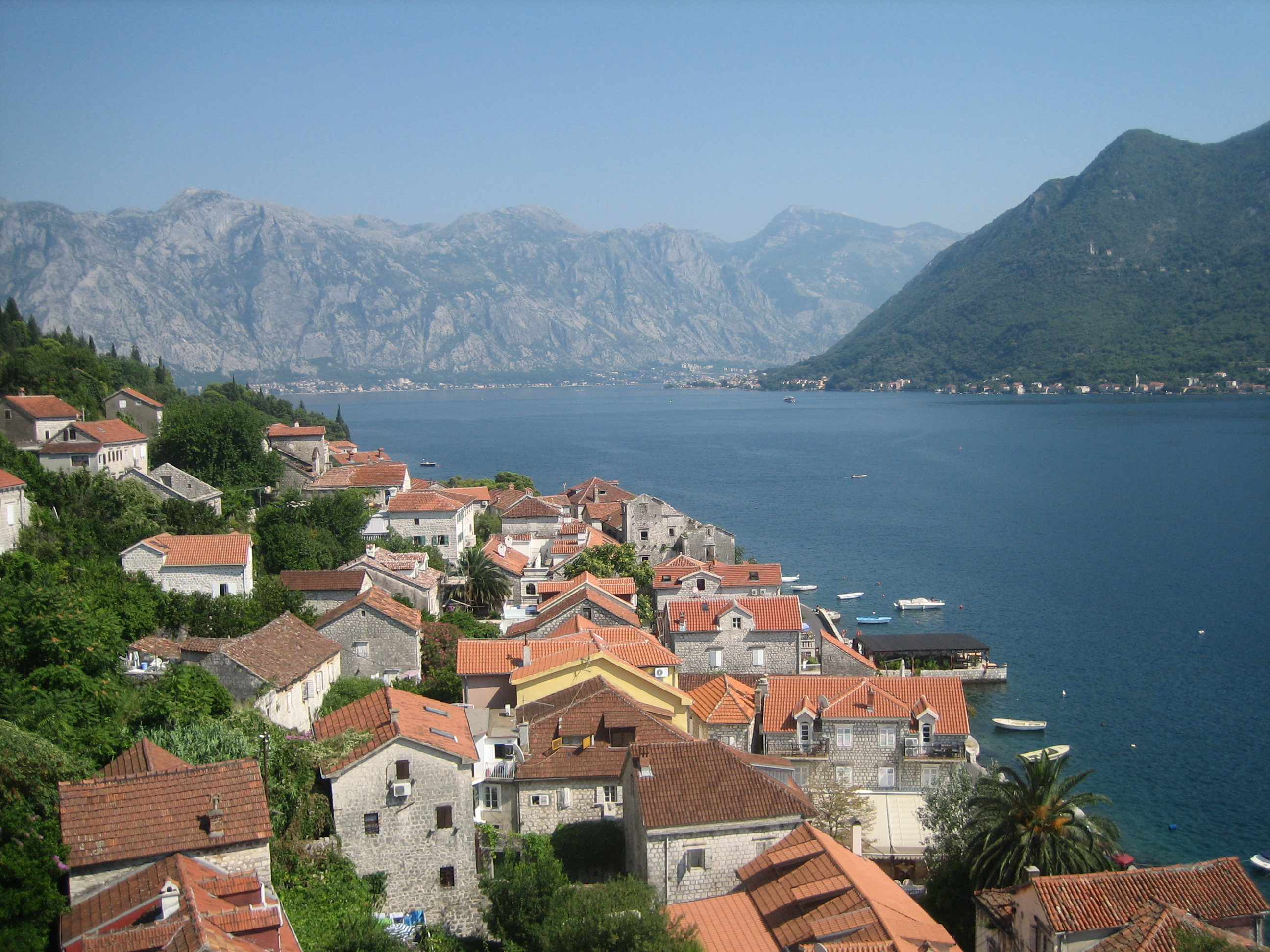
Perast and Bay of Kotor from Saint Nicholas' Church

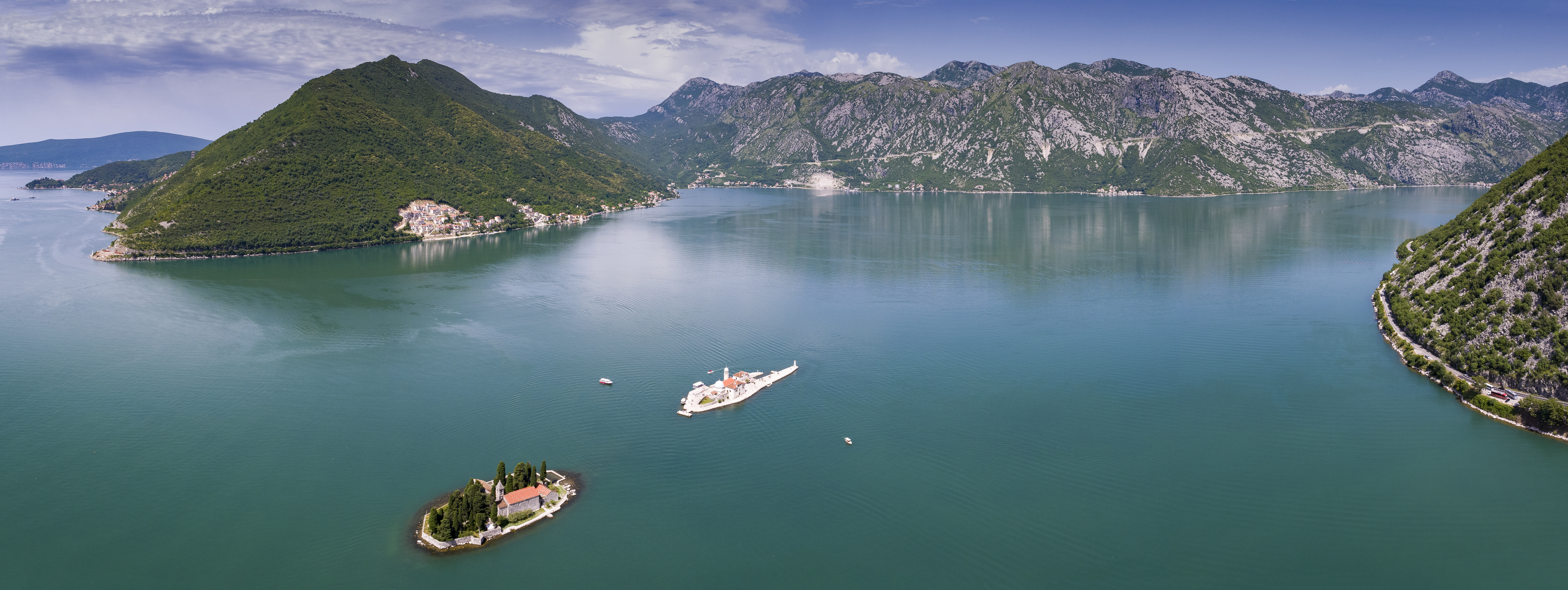
View over Bay of Kotor

The bay is about 28 kilometres (17 mi) long with a shoreline extending 107.3 kilometres (66.7 mi). It is surrounded by two massifs of the Dinaric Alps: the Orjen mountains to the west, and the Lovćen mountains to the east. The narrowest section of the bay, the 2,300-metre (7,500 ft) long Verige Strait, is only 340 metres (1,120 ft) wide at its narrowest point. The bay is a ria of the vanished Bokelj River, which used to flow from the high mountain plateaus of Mount Orjen.

The bay is composed of several smaller broad bays, united by narrower channels. The bay inlet was formerly a river system. Tectonic and karstification processes led to the disintegration of this river. After heavy rains, the waterfall of Sopot spring at Risan appears, and Škurda, another well-known spring, runs through a canyon from Lovćen.

The outermost part of the bay is the Bay of Tivat. On the seaward side is the Bay of Herceg Novi, at the main entrance to the Bay of Kotor. The inner bays are the Bay of Risan to the northwest and the Bay of Kotor to the southeast.

The Verige Strait represents the bay's narrowest section and is located between Cape St. Nedjelja and Cape Opatovo; it separates the inner bay east of the strait from the Bay of Tivat.

=== Climate ===
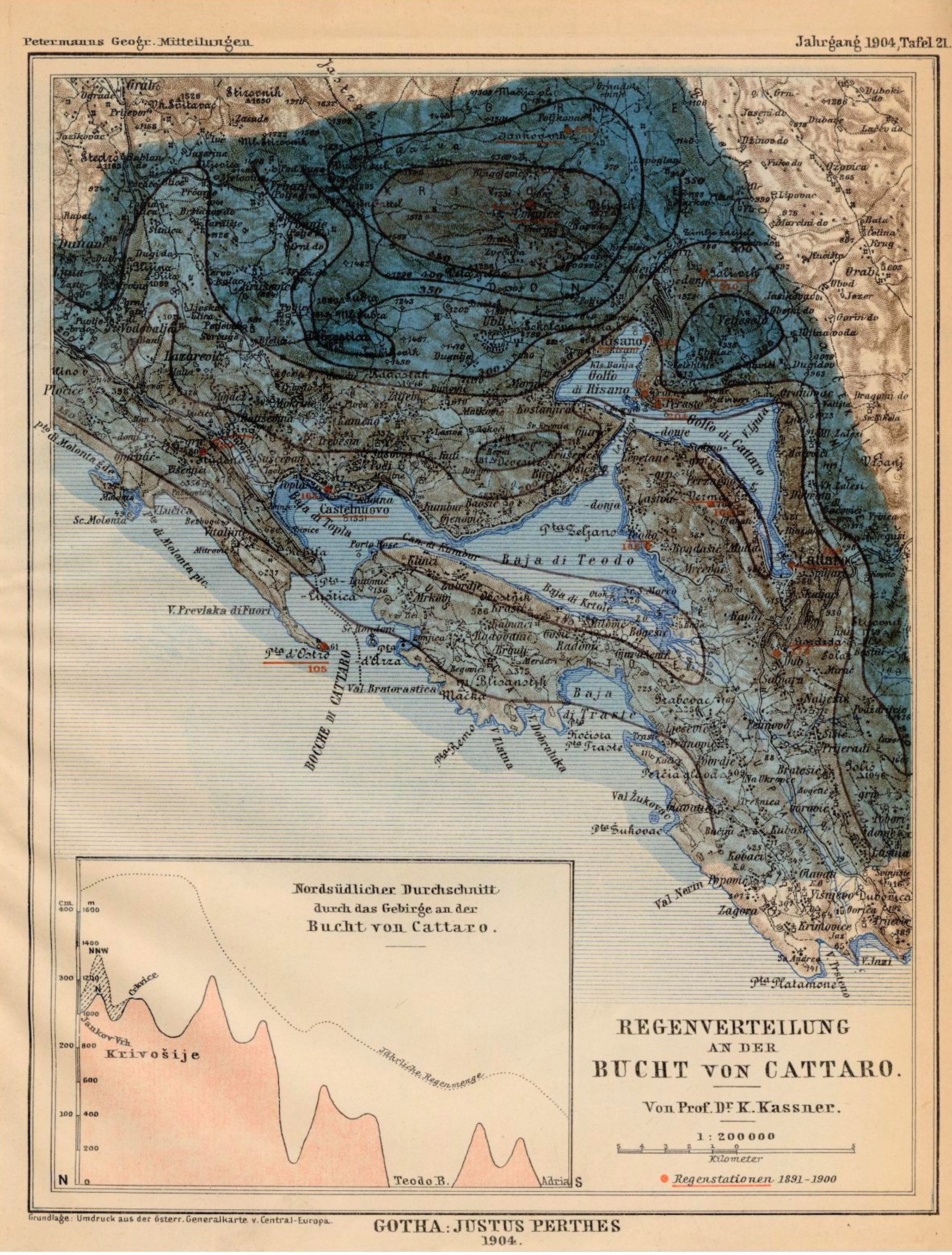
Rain distribution map of "the rainiest region of Europe", by meteorologist Carl Kassner, 1904

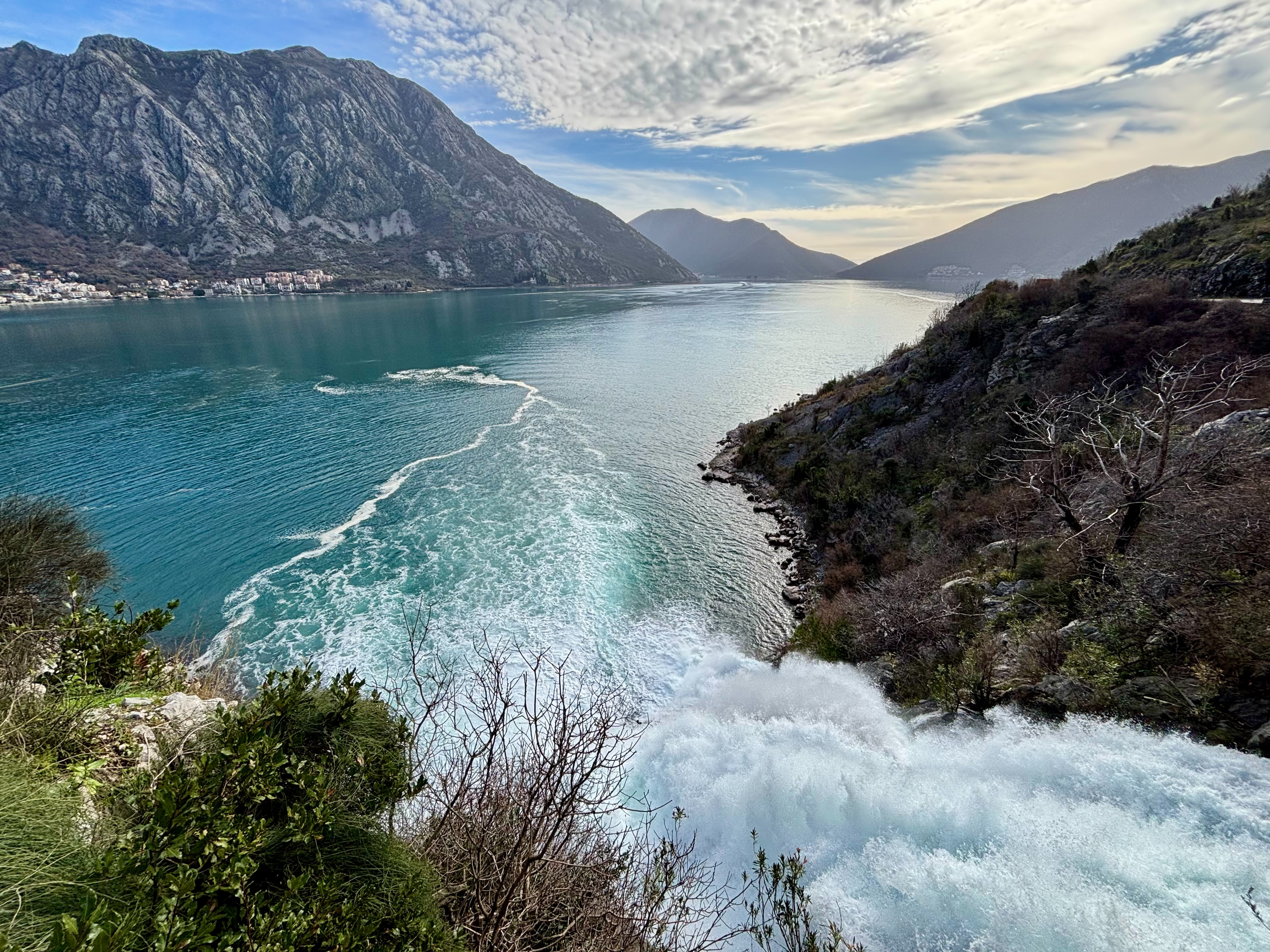
Sopot waterfall

The bay lies within the Mediterranean and northwards the humid subtropical climate zone, but its peculiar topography and high mountains make it one of the wettest places in Europe, with Europe's wettest inhabited areas (although certain Icelandic glaciers are wetter). The littoral Dinaric Alps and the Accursed Mountains receive the most precipitation, leading to small snow patches surviving well above the 0 °C (32 °F) mean annual isotherm. November thunderstorms sometimes drop large amounts of water. By contrast, in August the area is frequently completely dry, leading to forest fires. With a maximum discharge of 200 m^{3}/s (7,100 cu ft/s), one of the biggest karst springs, the Sopot spring, reflects this seasonal variation. Most of the time it is inactive but after heavy rain a waterfall appears 20 metres (66 ft) above the Bay of Kotor.

Station	Height [m]	Type	Character	Precipitation [mm]	Snow
Veliki kabao	1894	D	perhumid Mediterranean snowclimate	c. 6250	ap. 140 days
Crkvice	940	Cfsb	(fs= without summerdryness), perhumid Mediterranean mountain climate	4926	70 days
Risan	0	Cs’’a	(s’’= double winter rain season), perhumid Mediterranean coast climate	3500	0.4 days

* classification scheme after Köppen

Two wind systems have ecological significance: Bora and Jugo. Strong cold downslope winds of the Bora type appear in winter and are most severe in the Bay of Risan. Gusts reach 250 km/h (160 mph) and can lead to a significant temperature decline over several hours with freezing events. Bora weather situations are frequent and sailors study the mountains as cap clouds indicate an imminent Bora event. Jugo is a warm humid wind and brings heavy rain. It appears throughout the year but is usually concentrated in autumn and spring.

Monthly and yearly precipitation ranges:

Station	Period	Height [m]	I	II	III	IV	V	VI	VII	VIII	IX	X	XI	XII	I-XII [mm/m²a]
Herceg Novi	1961–1984	40	230	221	183	135	130	73	28	45	160	181	326	262	1974
Risan	1961–1984	40	405	342	340	235	153	101	66	123	188	295	423	434	3105
Grahovo	1961–1984	710	351	324	305	251	142	94	55	103	202	416	508	473	3224
Podvrsnik	1961–1984	630	407	398	367	305	151	101	77	132	238	465	593	586	3820
Vrbanj	1961–1984	1010	472	390	388	321	181	104	70	122	224	369	565	536	3742
Knežlaz	1961–1984	620	547	472	473	373	207	120	72	136	268	400	629	661	4358
Crkvice	1961–1984	940	610	499	503	398	198	135	82	155	295	502	714	683	4774
Ivanova Korita	1960–1984	1350	434	460	742	472	128	198	74	46	94	300	694	972	4614
Goli vrh	1893–1913	1311	271	286	307	226	188	148	75	70	215	473	415	327	3129
Jankov vrh	1890–1909	1017	424	386	389	346	212	124	55	58	202	484	579	501	3750

=== Hydrology ===
- Hydrologic system: karst hydrology ca. 4000 km^{2}, Sopot, Škurda, submerged sources
- Water area: 87 km^{2}
- Max depth: 60 m
- Average depth: 27.3 m
- Water content:24,12306 km^{3} (ca. 2.4 mrd m^{3})
- Highest point: Orjen (1894 m)
- Lowest point: sea surface (0 m)
- Length: 28,13 km
- Widest point: 7 km
- Narrowest point: || 0.3 km

== History ==
=== Serbian rule ===
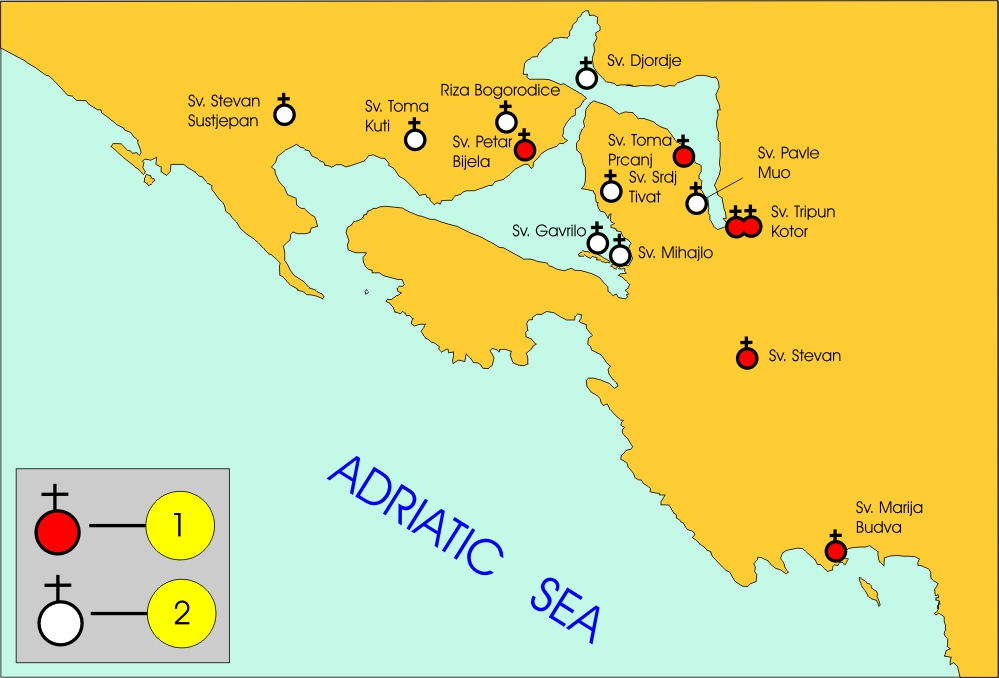
Churches in the Bay of Kotor: 1) from the 9th and 2) 10th and 11th century

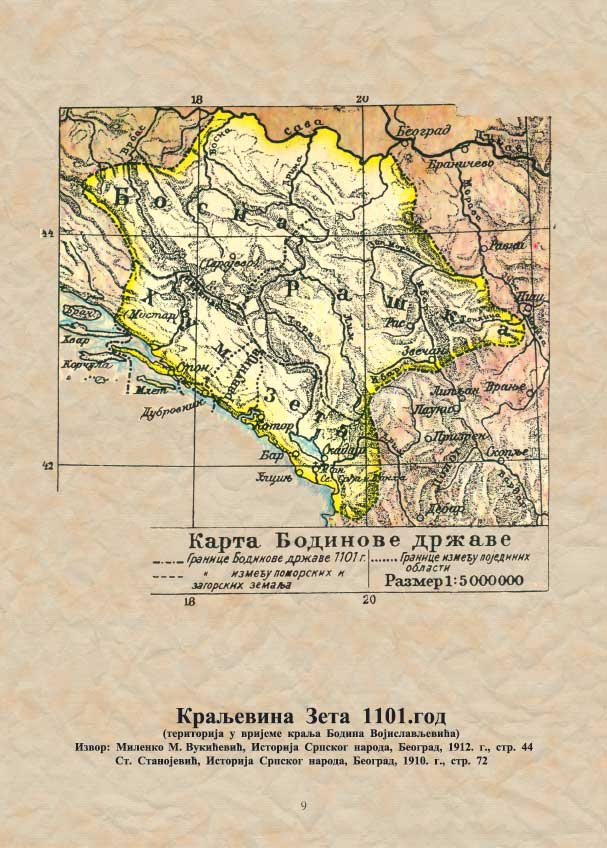
The Bay of Kotor within the Kingdom of Zeta in the 12th century

The Sklavenoi, South Slavs, settled in the Balkans in the 6th century. The Serbs, mentioned in the Royal Frankish Annals of the mid-9th century, controlled a great part of Dalmatia ("Sorabos, quae natio magnam Dalmatiae partem obtinere dicitur"). Constantine VII Porphyrogennetos in De Administrando Imperio mentions that, from Croats who came to Dalmatia, one part was separated and took rule in Illyricum. The Slavic, Serbian tribes, consolidated under the Vlastimirović dynasty (610–960). The two principalities of Doclea and Travunia were roughly adjacent at Boka. As elsewhere in the Balkans, Slavs mixed with the Roman population of these Byzantine coastal cities. The Theme of Dalmatia was established in the 870s. According to De Administrando Imperio (ca. 960), Risan was part of Travunia, a Serbian principality ruled by the Belojević family.

After the Great Schism of 1054, the coastal region was under both Churches. In 1171, Stefan Nemanja sided with the Republic of Venice in a dispute with the Byzantine Empire. The Venetians incited the Slavs of the eastern Adriatic littoral to rebel against Byzantine rule and Nemanja joined them, launching an offensive towards Kotor. The Bay was thenceforth under the rule of the Nemanjić dynasty. In 1195, Nemanja and his son Vukan constructed the Church of Saint Luka in Kotor. In 1219, Saint Sava founded the seat of the Eparchy of Zeta on Prevlaka, one of the eparchies of the Serbian Orthodox Church. Due to its protected location, Kotor became a major city for the salt trade. The area flourished during the 14th century under the rule of Emperor of the Serbs Dušan the Mighty who, notorious for his aggressive law enforcement, made the Bay of Kotor a particularly safe place for doing business.

The city of Kotor was under Nemanjić rule until 1371. It was followed by a period of frequent political changes in the region. Local lords from the Vojinović and Balšić noble families fought over the influence in the region. Since 1377, northern parts of the Bay region came under the rule of Tvrtko I Kotromanić, who proclaimed himself King of the Serbs and Bosnia. For several years (1385–1391), the city of Kotor also recognized the suzerainty of the Kingdom of Bosnia. After 1391, it gained political independence, and functioned as a city-state until 1420. Its merchant fleet and importance gradually increased, but so was the interest of the powerful Republic of Venice for the city and the bay region. From 1405 to 1412, the First Scutari War was fought in the region.

=== Venetian rule (1420–1797) ===
In 1420, the city of Kotor recognized the Venetian rule, marking the beginning of an era that would last until 1797. Northern parts of the Bay region still remained under the Kingdom of Bosnia, while southern parts were controlled the Lordship of Zeta, followed by the Serbian Despotate. In the meanwhile, the Second Scutari War was fought in the region, resulting in the peace treaties of 1423 and 1426.

By the middle of the 15th century, northern parts of the Bay region became incorporated into the Duchy of Saint Sava. In 1482, Ottomans took the city of Novi, establishing their rule in the northern parts of the Bay area. Under Ottoman rule, those regions were attached to the Sanjak of Herzegovina. The Ottoman possessions in the Bay region were retaken at the end of the 17th century and the whole area became part of the Venetian Republic, within the province of Venetian Albania. Until the 20th century, the difference between the two parts was visible because the former Ottoman part had an Orthodox majority, while the part that was under Venetian rule had a Catholic majority.

The town of Perast had difficult moments in 1654 when the Ottomans attacked, retaliating against Bokeljs who had sunk an Ottoman ship. The Bokeljs' successful defence of Perast and the Bay received attention all over Europe. It attracted Petar Zrinski, a statesman in Europe who had fought dramatic battles with the Turks. During his three-day sojourn in Perast he presented his legendary sword to the town in recognition for their efforts to defend their homeland, and to stop the Ottoman Empire.

In 1669, according to Andrija Zmajević, hajduks of the Bay wished to build a church, but were denied due to Zmajević's intervention on the providur of Kotor and the captain of Perast. Ottoman travel writer Evliya Çelebi visited the Bay of Kotor and mentioned Croats who lived in Herceg Novi.

=== Modern history ===
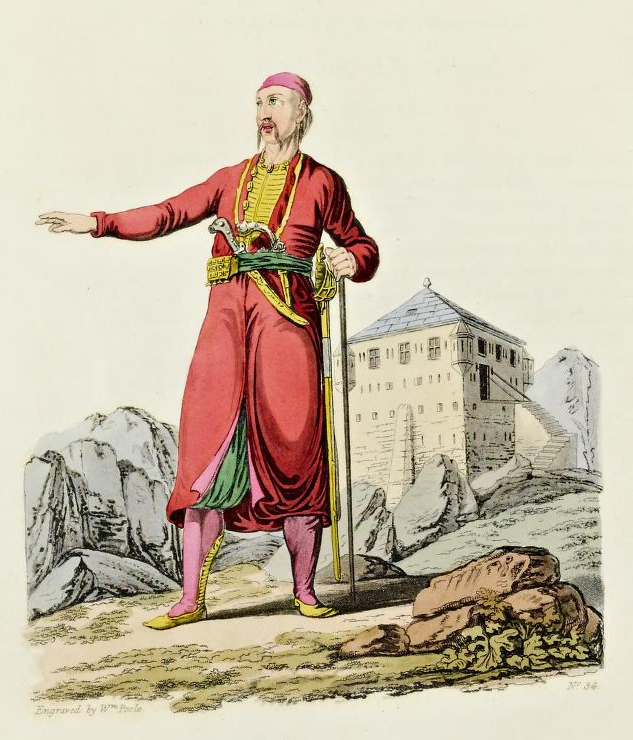
A Count of Cattaro depicted by Bertrand de Molleville, 1804

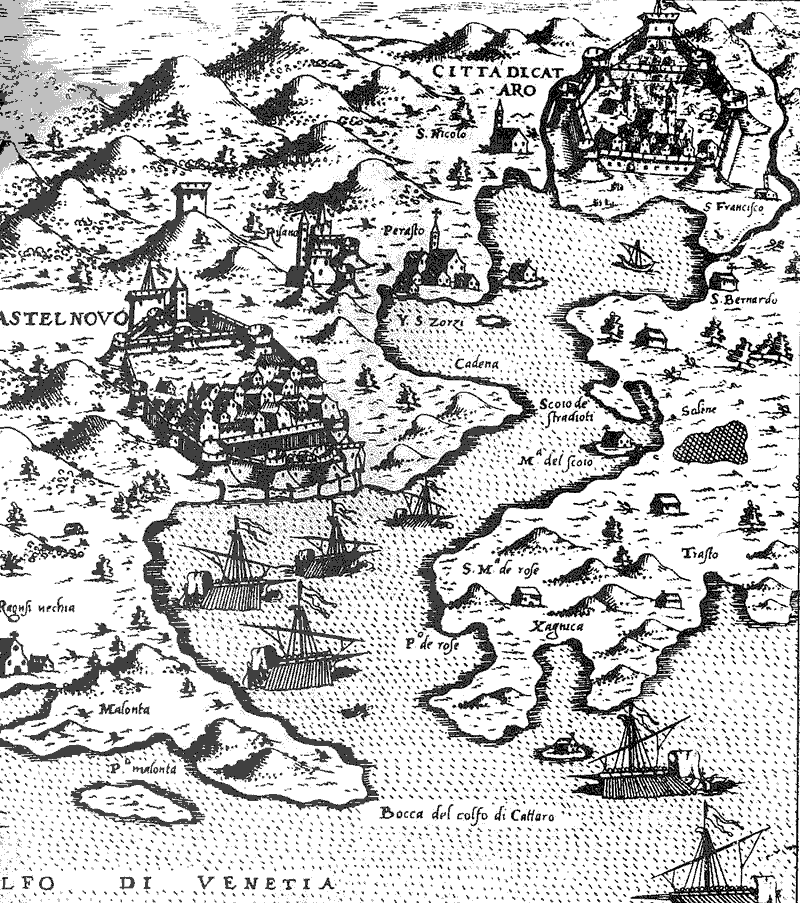
Historic map of the Bay of Kotor

By the Treaty of Campo Formio (1797), the Bay region came under the Habsburg rule. By the Treaty of Pressburg (1805), the region was set to be transferred to the French rule, but that was effectively achieved only after the Treaties of Tilsit (1807). Under the French rule, the Bay region was included in the Napoleonic Kingdom of Italy and later in the Illyrian Provinces, which were a part of the French Empire. The region was later conquered by Montenegro with Russian help by Prince-Bishop Petar I Petrović-Njegoš and, in 1813, a union of the bay area with Montenegro was declared. In 1815, the bay was annexed by the Austrian Empire and was included in the province of Dalmatia (part of Cisleithania since 1867). In 1848, when the numerous revolutions sparked in the Austrian Empire, an Assembly of the Bay of Kotor was held sponsored by Petar II Petrović-Njegoš of Montenegro, to decide on the proposition of the Bay's unification with Ban of Croatia Josip Jelačić in an attempt to unite Dalmatia, Croatia and Slavonia under the Habsburg crown.

The Kingdom of Montenegro attempted to take the Bay during World War I. It was bombed from Lovćen, but, by 1916, Austria-Hungary had defeated Montenegro. During Austro-Hungarian rule, the majority of people participated in the Great Retreat with the Royal Serbian Army through Albania. On 7 November 1918, the Serbian army entered the Bay. Within a month, the Kingdom of Serbs, Croats and Slovenes was formed and was renamed as Yugoslavia in 1929. The Bay was a municipality of Dalmatia until it was re-organized into smaller districts (oblasts) in 1922. It was incorporated into the Oblast of Cetinje and, from 1929, into the Zeta Banovina. Under Ottoman and then Austro-Hungarian control Hercegovina had had a narrow exit to the sea, the so-called Sutorina strip. In 1945 Montenegro was assigned the strip. According to the 1910 census, the bay had 40,582 inhabitants, of whom 24,794 were Eastern Orthodox and 14,523 Catholic.

The Bay region was occupied by the Royal Italian Army in April 1941, and was included in the Governorate of Dalmatia until September 1943. Since 1945, it was part of the People's Republic of Montenegro.

== Culture ==
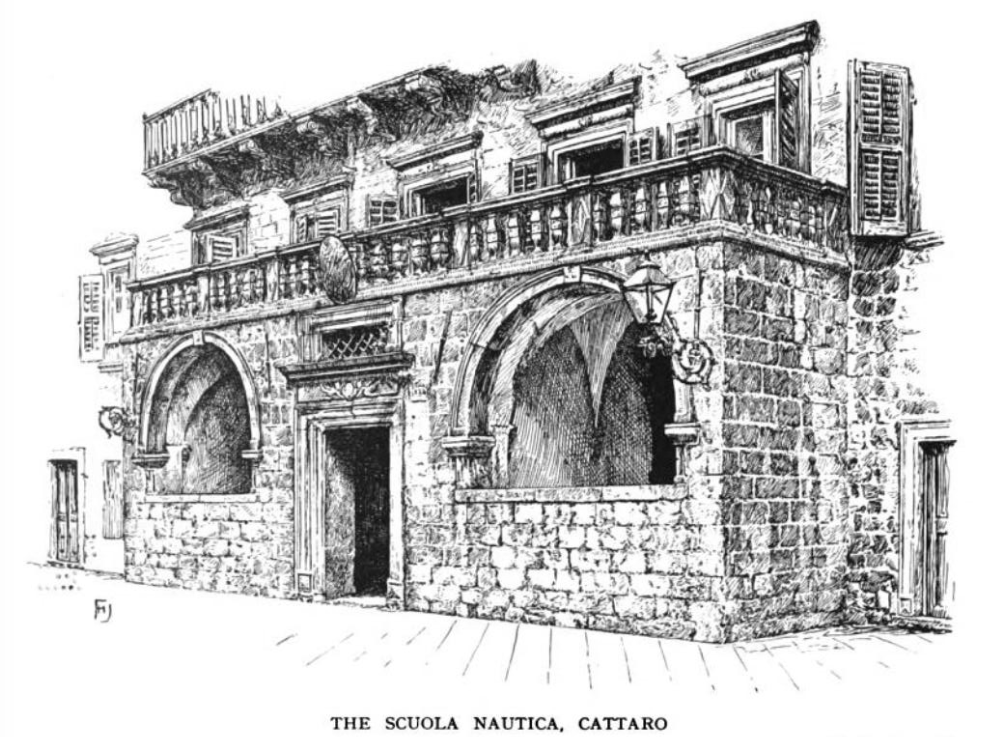
The Scuola Nautica in Kotor, 1908

Most of the region's inhabitants are Orthodox Christians, declaring themselves on census forms of either Montenegrins or Serbians, while a minority are Croatians. The Bay region is under the protection of UNESCO due to its rich cultural heritage.

The Boka region has a long maritime tradition and harbored a strong fleet since the Middle Ages, which historically formed the backbone of the Bay's economy. Kotor was home to a notable naval academy, the Scuola Nautica. The fleet peaked at 300 ships in the 18th century, when Boka was a rival to Dubrovnik and Venice. During the Austro-Hungarian period, the Bay of Kotor produced the majority of sea captains of the Österreichischer Lloyd shipping company.

Historically, inhabitants of both dominant faiths of the Boka region were referred to as Bocchesi (an Italian-language exonym). In 1806, about two-thirds of Bocchesi were adherents of Eastern Orthodoxy, the remaining third being Catholic. Catholicism was the dominant faith in Perast. During the 19th century, Orthodox Bocchesi were strongly in favor of a union with the Prince-Bishopric of Montenegro, while many Catholic inhabitants favored continued Austro-Hungarian rule.

On the landward side, long walls run from the fortified old town of Kotor to the castle of Saint John, far above; the heights of the Krivošije, a group of barren plateaus in Mount Orjen, were crowned by small forts.

The shores of the bay Herceg Novi house the Orthodox convent of St. Sava near (Savina monastery) standing amid surrounding gardens. It was founded in the 16th century and contains many specimens of 17th century silversmiths' work. 12.87 km east of Herceg Novi, there is a Benedictine monastery on a small island opposite Perast (Perasto). Perast itself was for a time an independent state in the 14th century.

== Demographics ==
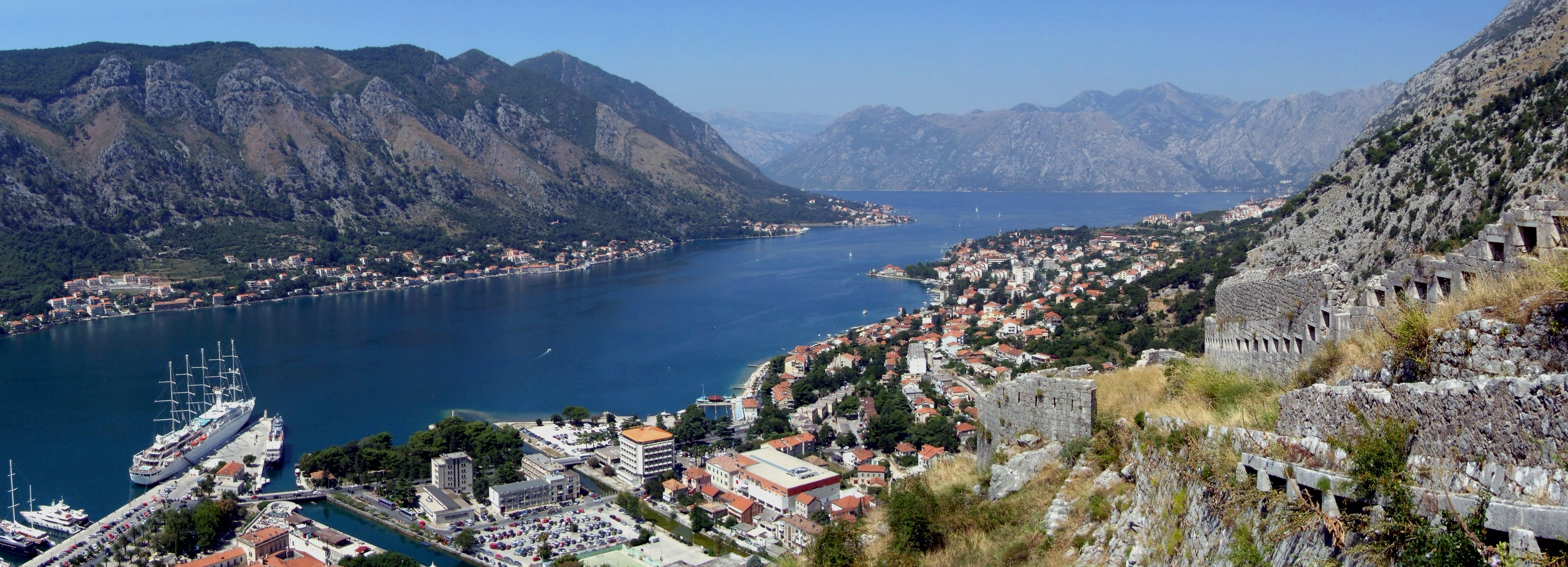
Kotor and Boka kotorska

The Bokelj (Бокељ) people (pl. Бокељи, Bokelji) are the inhabitants of the Boka kotorska (hence the name) and adjacent regions (near the towns of Kotor, Tivat, Herceg Novi, Risan, Perast). They are an ethnic South Slavic community, many of whom nationally identify as Serb, Montenegrin or Croat. Most are Eastern Orthodox, while some are Roman Catholics.

According to the 2023 Montenegro census, the total population of Boka was 69,908. When it comes to ethnic composition, in 2023 there were 28,521 (40.8%) Serbs, 25,091 (35.9%) Montenegrins, and 3,778 (5,4%) Croats.

- Herceg Novi – 30,824:
  - Serbs – 14,901 (48.34%)
  - Montenegrins – 9,175 (29.77%)
  - Croats – 511 (1.66%)
  - Russians – 1,930 (6.26%)
  - undeclared – 1,996 (6.48%)

- Kotor – 22,746:
  - Montenegrins – 10,562 (46.43%)
  - Serbs – 7,989 (35.12%)
  - Croats – 1,304 (5.73%)
  - Russians – 482 (2.12%)
  - undeclared – 1,204 (5.29%)

- Tivat – 16,338:
  - Serbs – 5,631 (34.47%)
  - Montenegrins – 5,354 (32.77%)
  - Croats – 1,963 (12.01%)
  - Russians – 880 (5.39%)
  - undeclared – 706 (4.31%)

The Budva Municipality was historically considered to be part of Boka as well. According to the 2023 Montenegro census, the total population of Budva was 27,445. When it comes to ethnic composition, in 2023 there were:

- 9,822 (35.79%) Serbs
- 9,774 (35.61%) Montenegrins
- 144 (0,52%) Croats
- 3738 (13.62%) Russians
- 966 (3.51%) undeclared

== Notable people ==
- Matija Zmajević – admiral and shipbuilder
- Marko Vojnović - admiral
- Marko Car – writer
- Ljubomir Jovanović – historian
- Andrija Paltašić – typographer
- Nikola Modruški – bishop
- Krsto Čorko – naval captain
- Petar Želalić – naval captain
- Ivan Visin – sailor
- Stjepan Mitrov Ljubiša – politician
- Rambo Amadeus – singer
- Leopold Mandić (1866–1942)
- Osanna of Cattaro (1493–1565)
- Giovanni Bona de Boliris

== Gallery ==
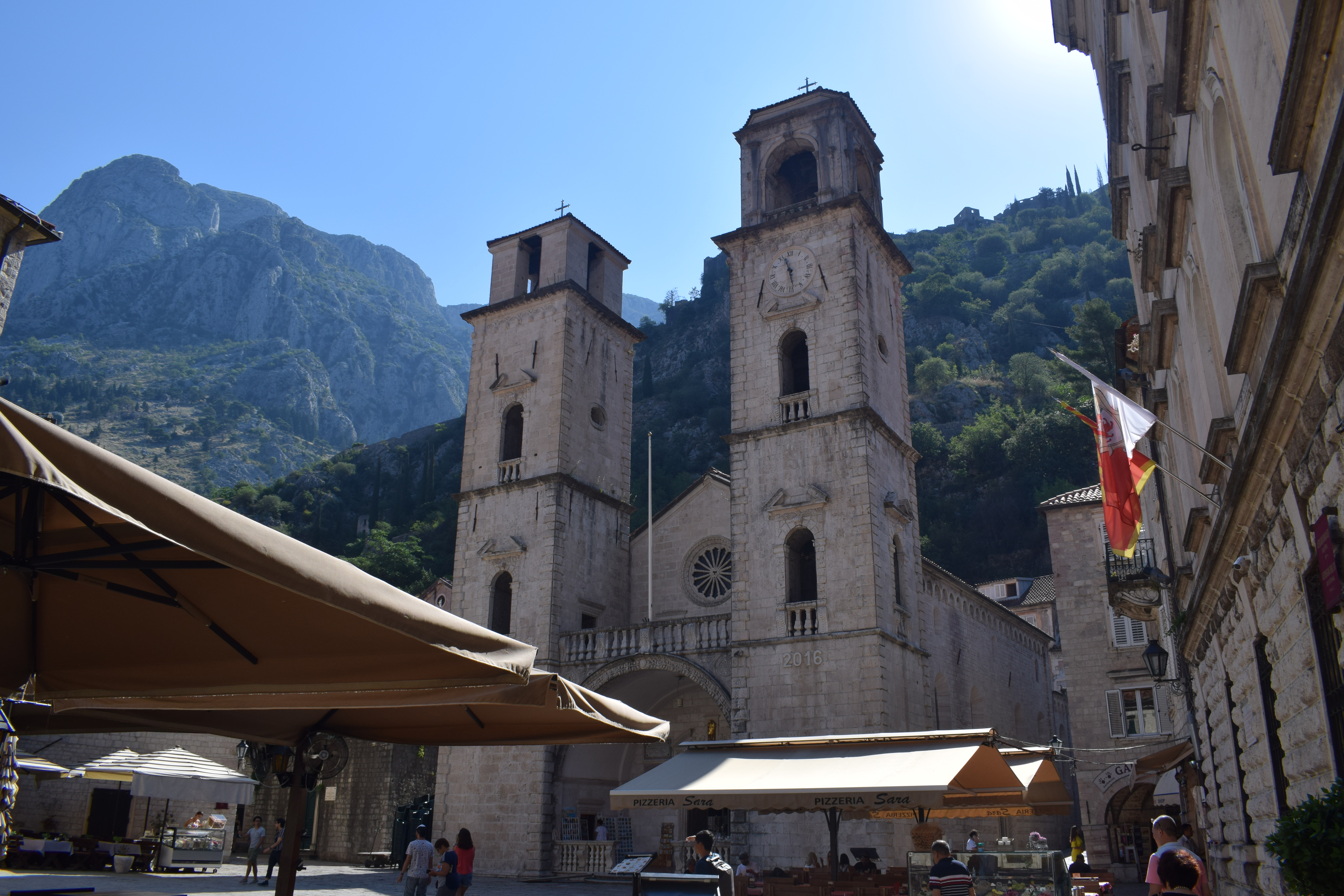
Cathedral of Saint Tryphon in Kotor.

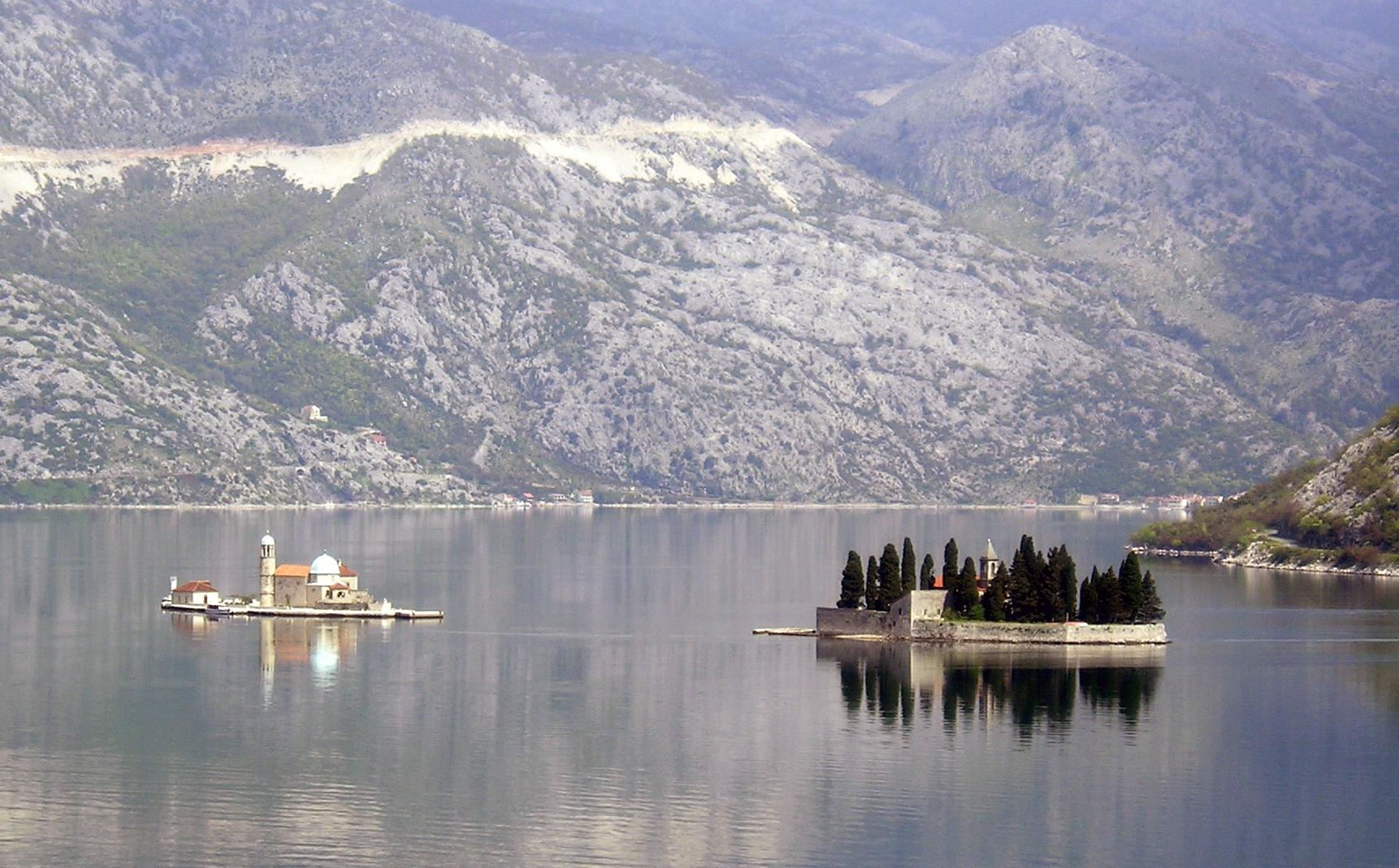
Saint-George and Our-Lady-of-the-Reef, two islands off Perast.

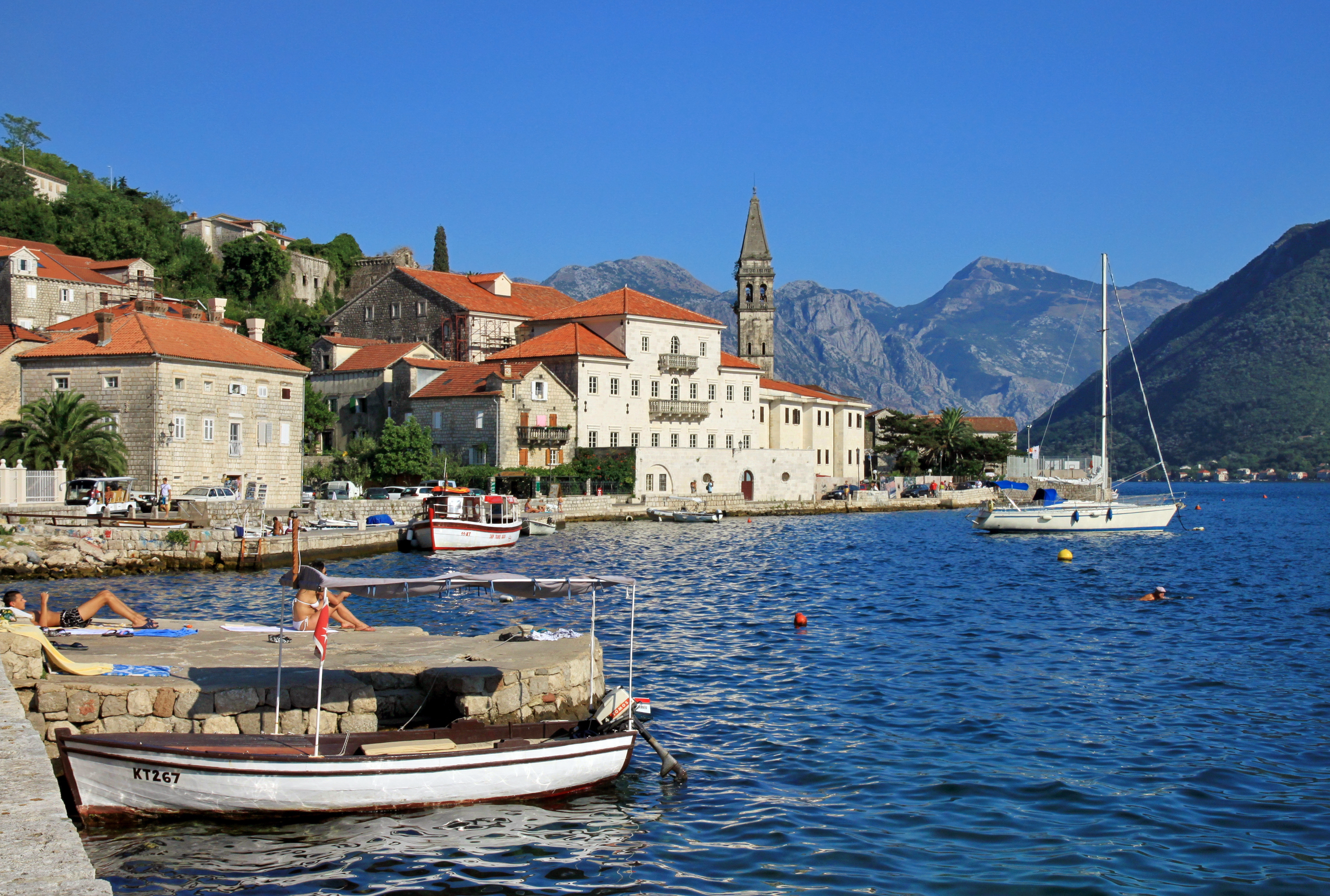
Town of Perast, Kotor Municipality

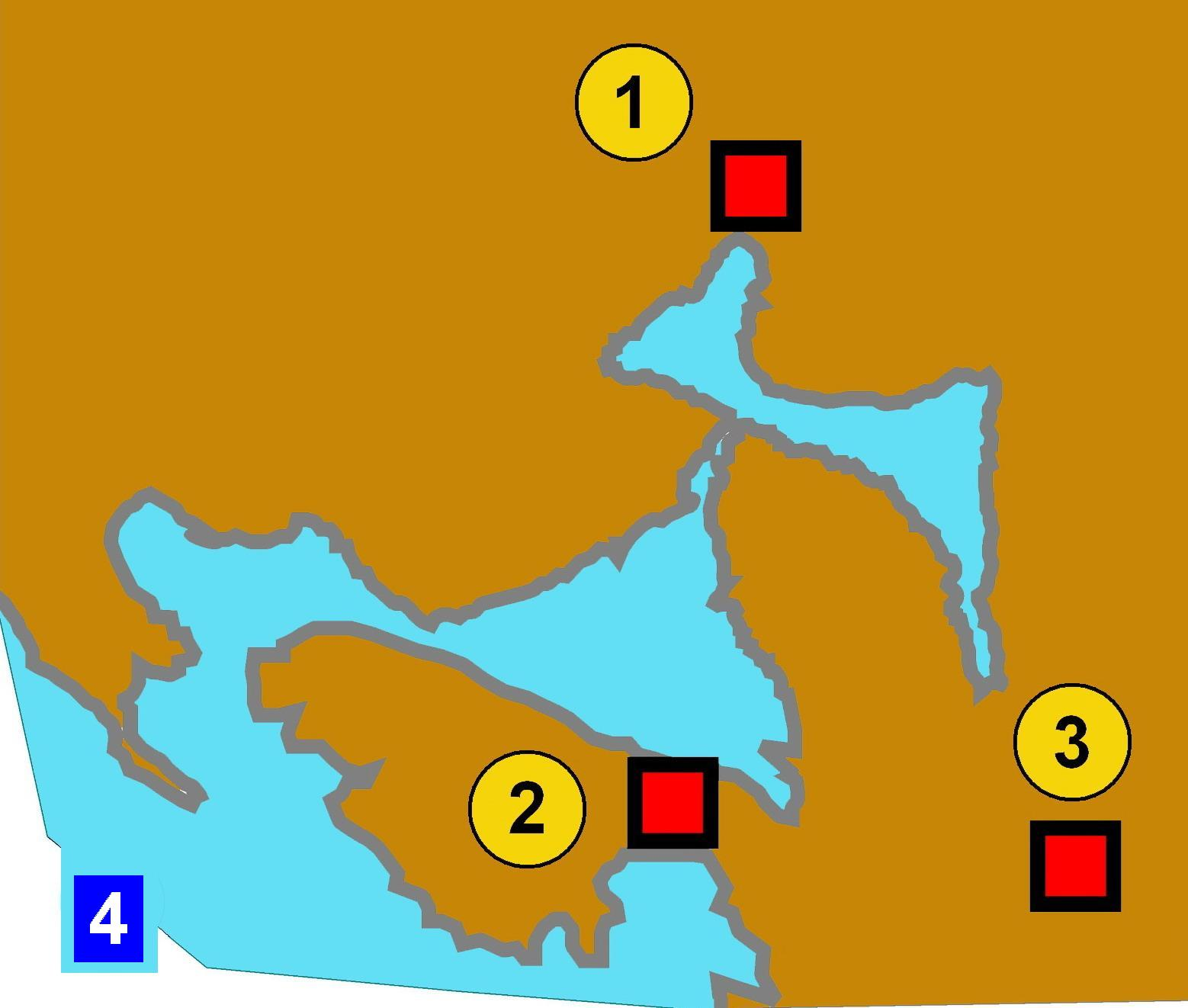
Bay of Kotor and Illyrian fortresses on the hills 1)Risan 2)Gosici 3)Kremalj (Mirac)

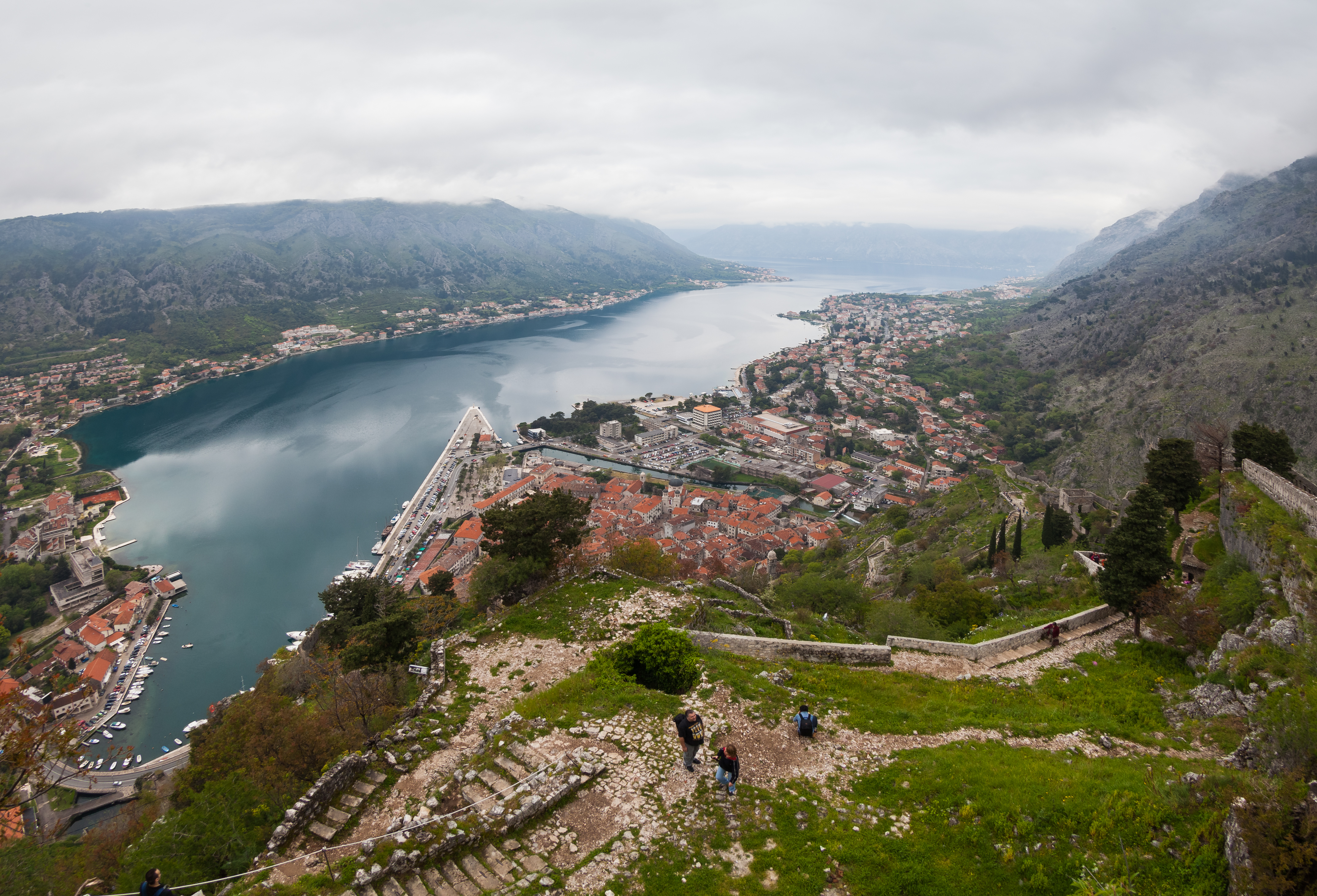
Kotor bay from St John Castle.

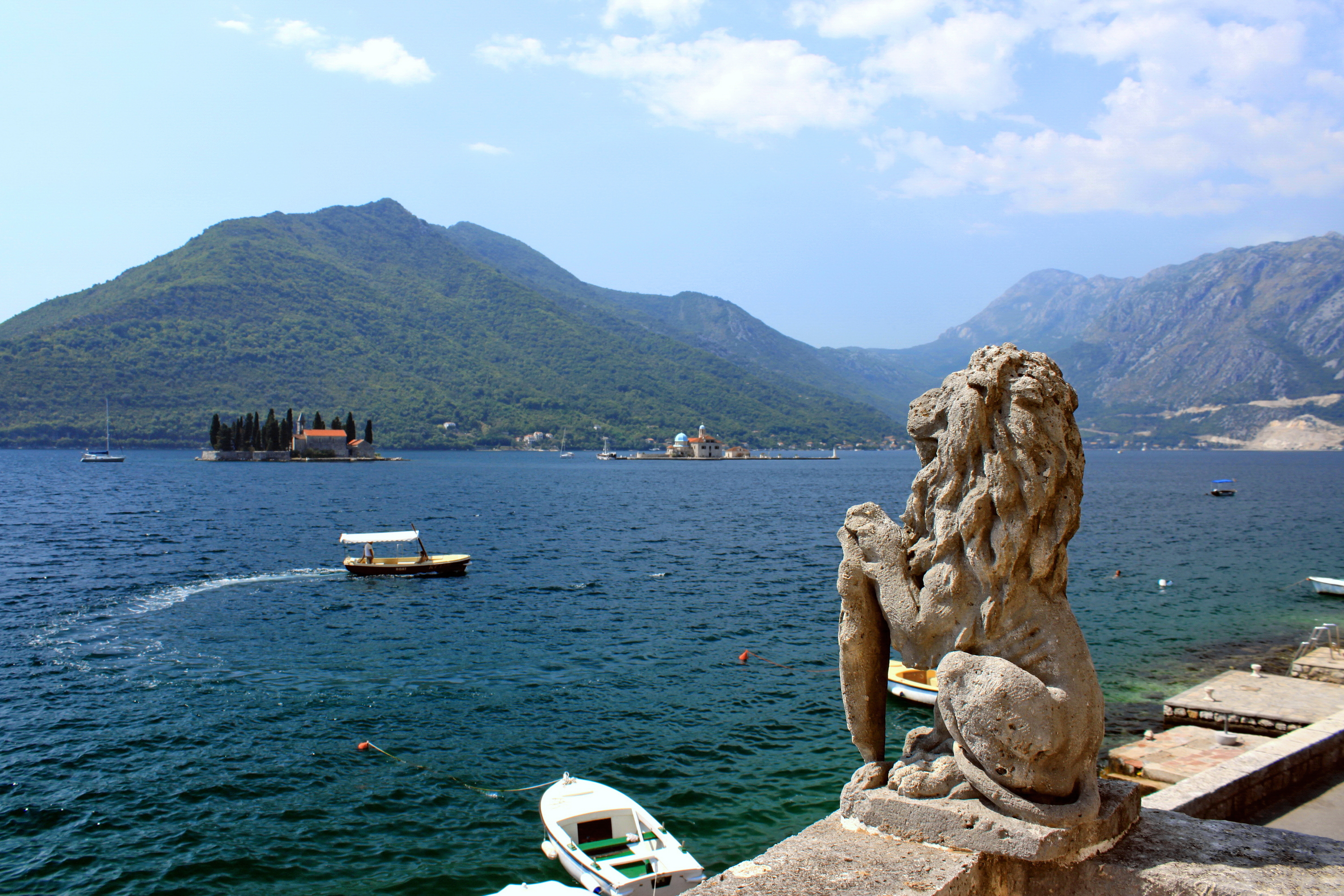
Stone lion and the Bay of Kotor. Perast, Montenegro.

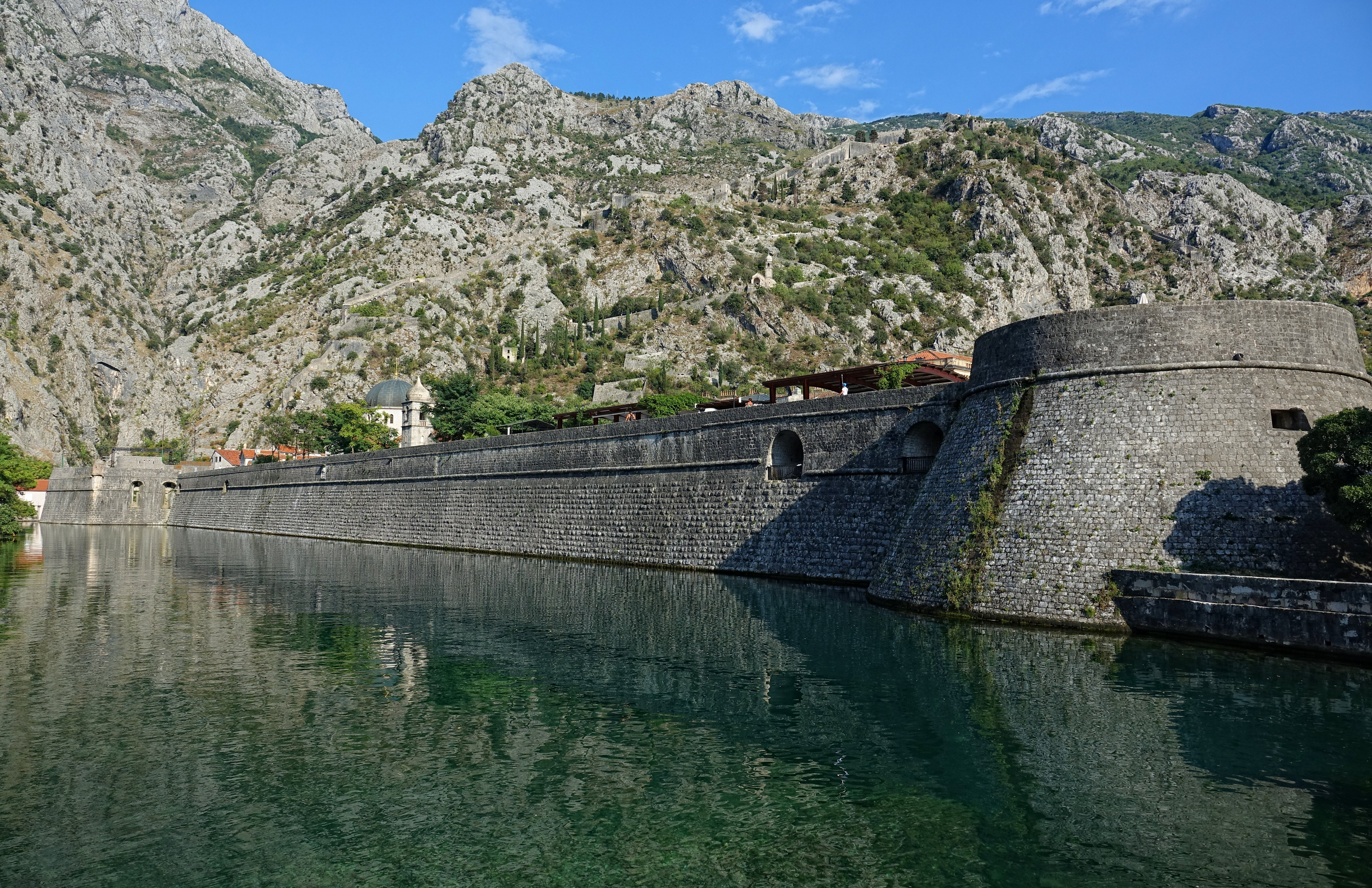
The ancient fortifications of Kotor

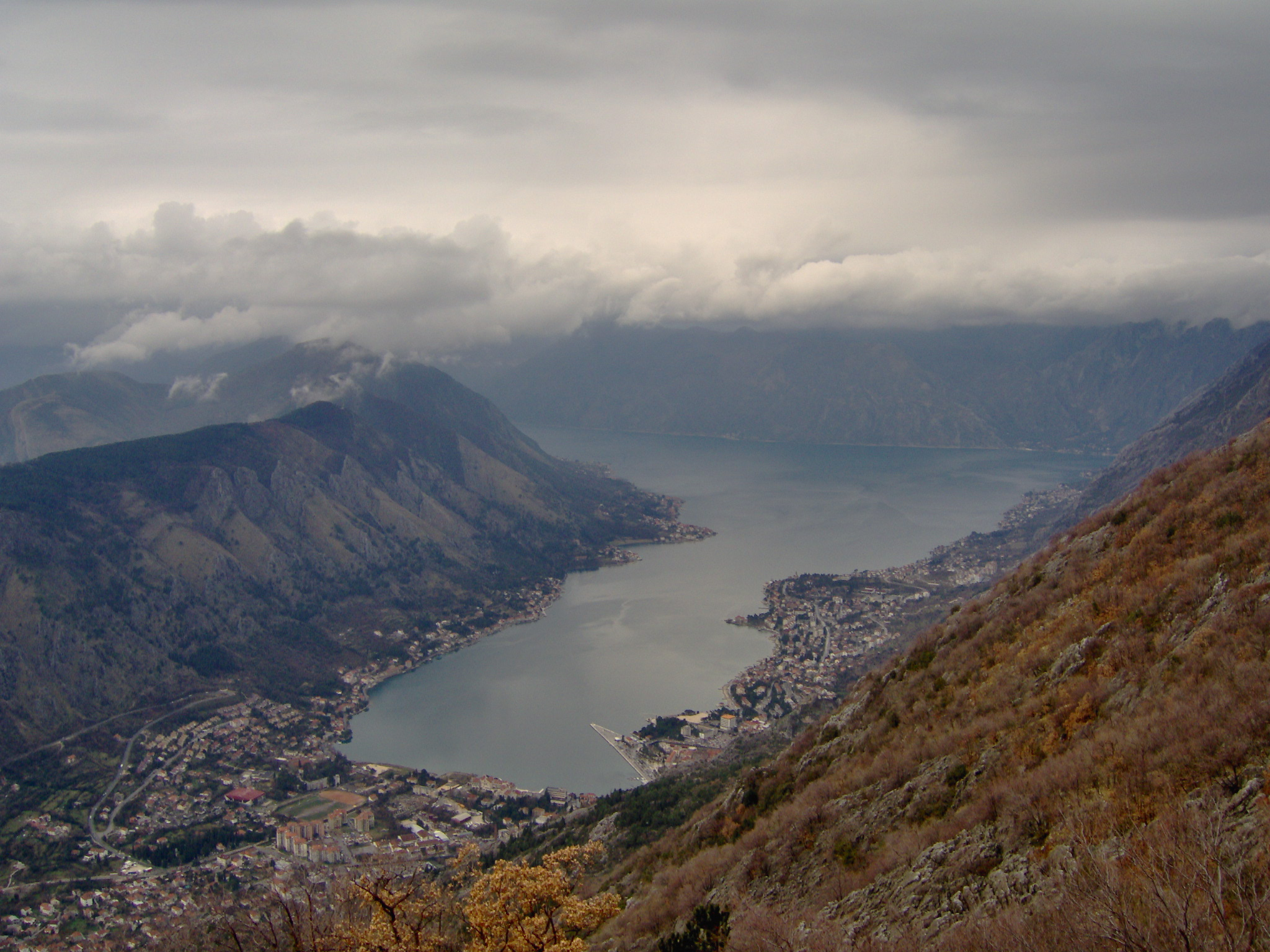
Panorama of the Bay of Kotor

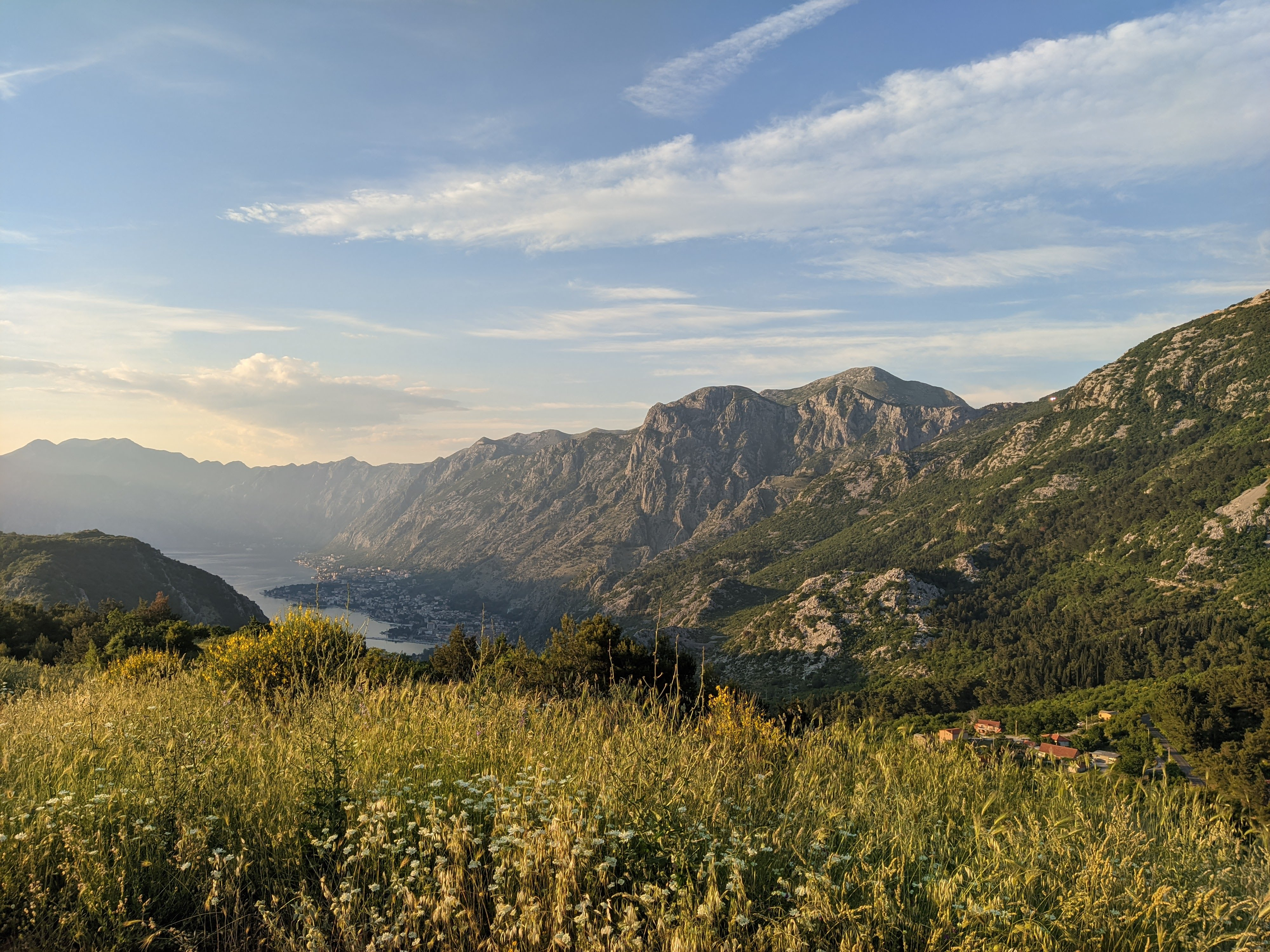
Kotor Bay, as seen from the Lovćen mountain.

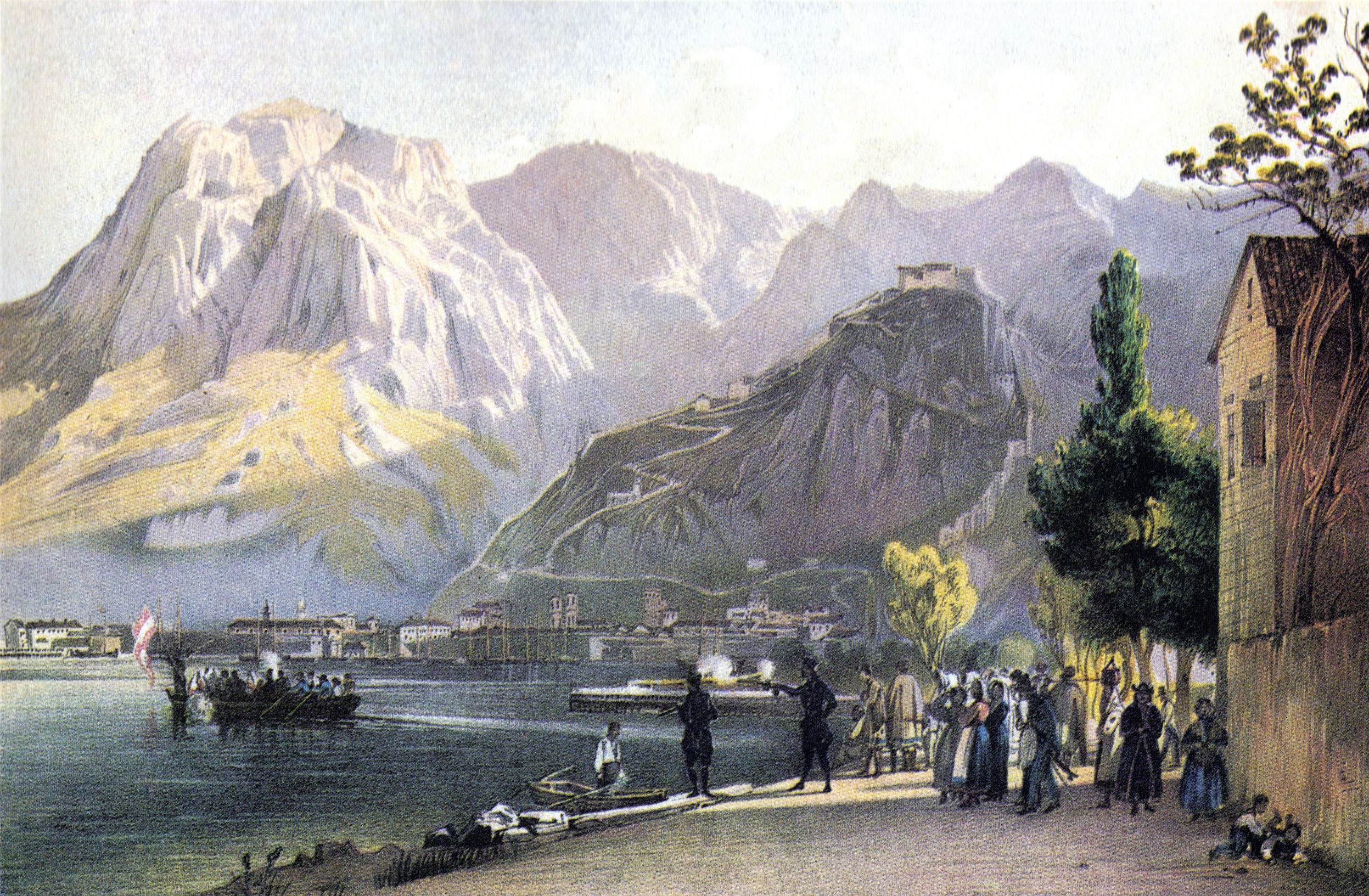
Kotor around 1840

== See also ==
- Albania Veneta
- List of deepest natural harbours
- Montenegrin Littoral

== Literature ==
- Ćirković, Sima (2004). The Serbs. Malden: Blackwell Publishing. ISBN 9781405142915.
- Fine, John Van Antwerp Jr. (1991) [1983]. The Early Medieval Balkans: A Critical Survey from the Sixth to the Late Twelfth Century. Ann Arbor, Michigan: University of Michigan Press. ISBN 0472081497.
- Fine, John Van Antwerp Jr. (1994) [1987]. The Late Medieval Balkans: A Critical Survey from the Late Twelfth Century to the Ottoman Conquest. Ann Arbor, Michigan: University of Michigan Press. ISBN 0472082604.
- Popović, Svetlana (2002). "The Serbian Episcopal sees in the thirteenth century (Српска епископска седишта у XIII веку)". Старинар (51: 2001): 171–184.
- Boka kotorska: Etnički sastav u razdoblju austrijske uprave (1814.-1918. g.), Ivan Crkvenčić, Antun Schaller, Hrvatski geografski glasnik 68/1, 51–72 (2006)
