= Carl Kassner =

German meteorologist (1864–1950)

Carl Julius Herrmann Kassner (1 November 1864 – 10 June 1950) was a German meteorologist . In 1891 he took the first photographic image of a flying person with a series of photographs showing Otto Lilienthal in the Derwitzer glider.

== Life ==
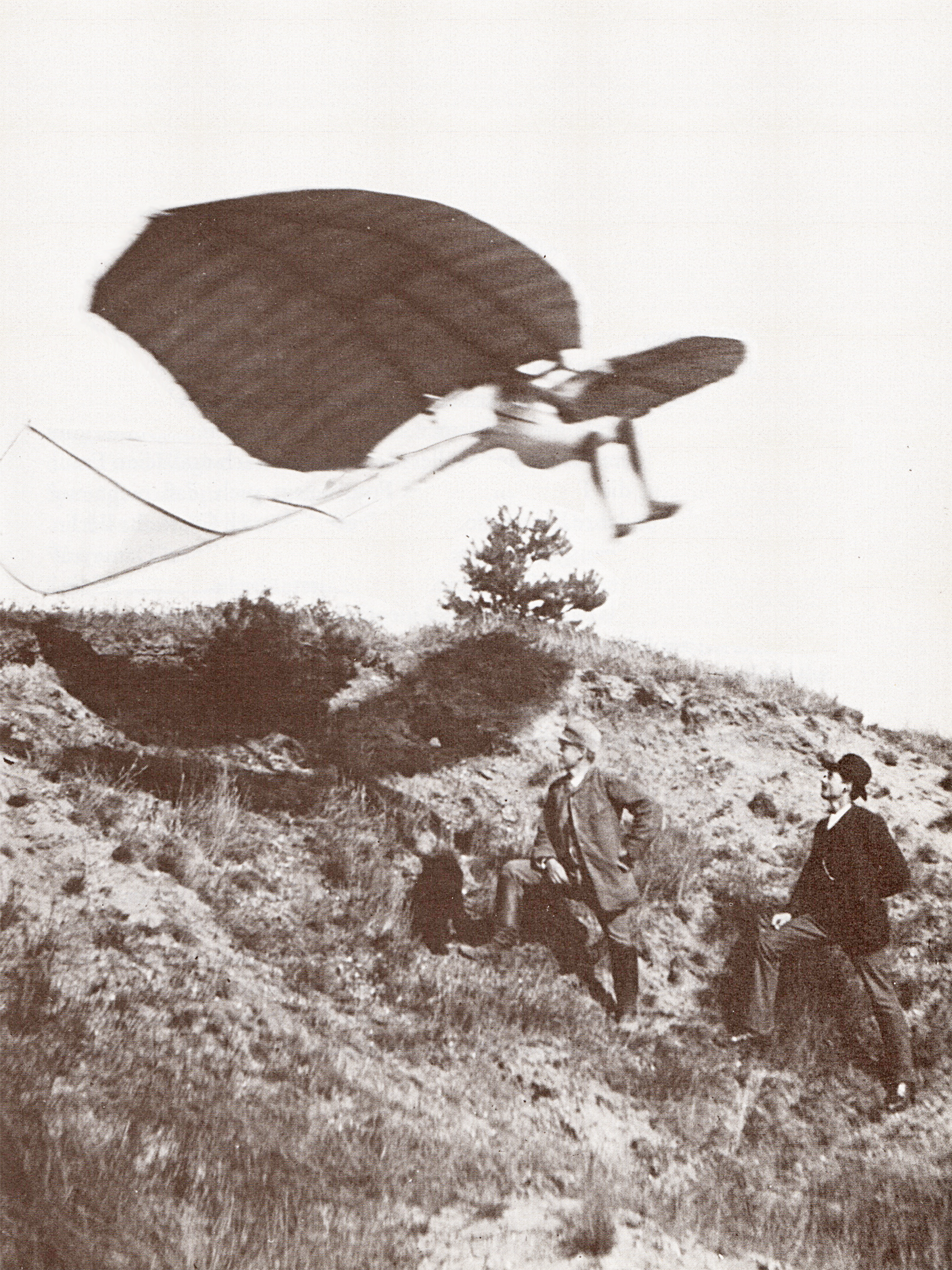
Lilienthal at Spitzen Berg between Derwitz and Krielow (photo by Carl Kassner,1891)

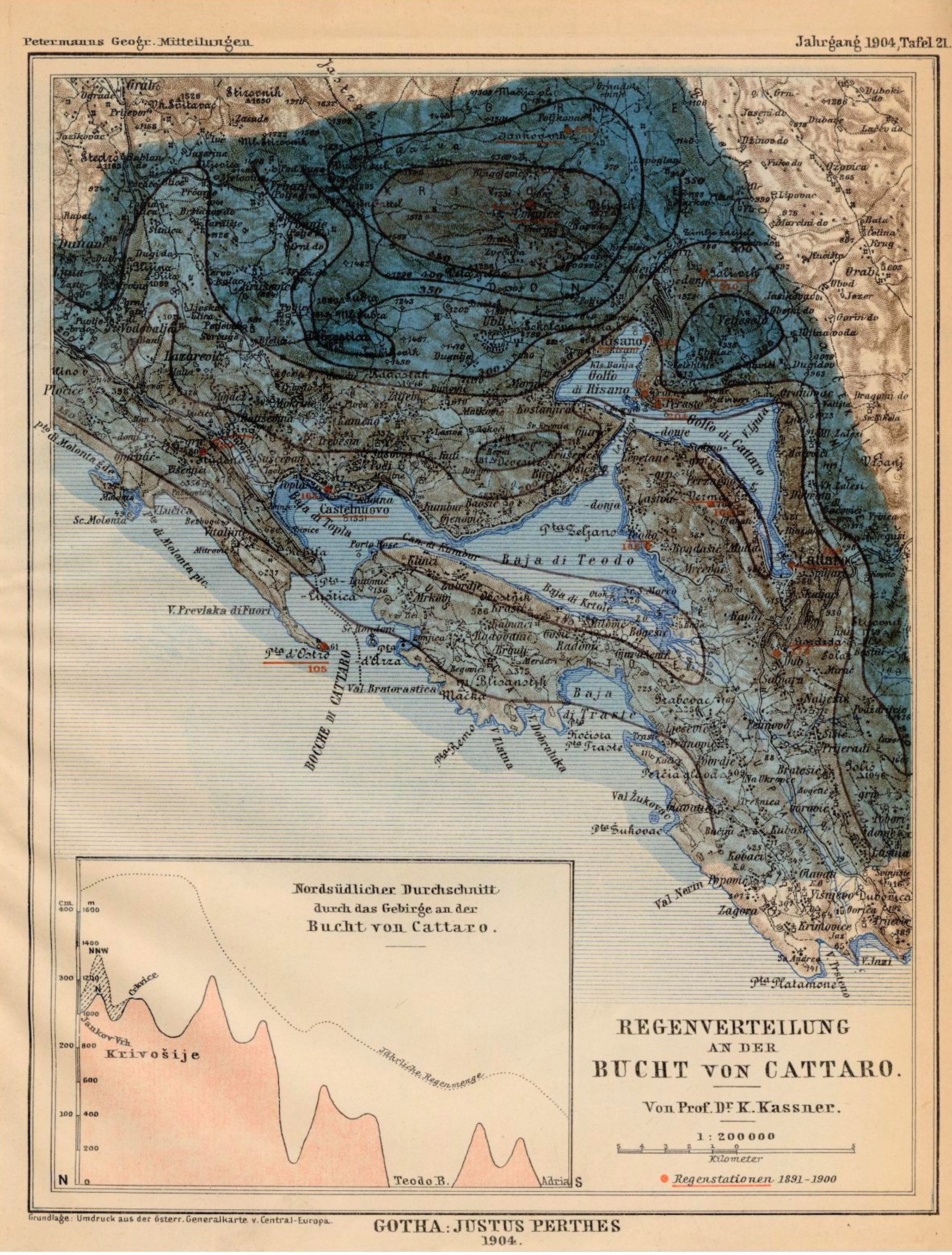
Precipitation contour map of Bay of Kotor by Carl Kassner, 1904

Carl was the son of Hermann Kassner and his wife Karoline, née Boxhammer. He attended the Königstädtische Real-Gymnasium in Berlin until 1883. After school, he enrolled in the Philosophical Faculty of the Friedrich Wilhelm University in Berlin, where he studied theology and philosophy until the seventh semester. He then took the subjects of mathematics, physics and astronomy.

Carl Kassner initially worked at the Urania and at the Royal Observatory in Berlin. From 1890 to 1925 he worked at the Prussian Meteorological Institute, and from September 1, 1909, as department head.

He became acquainted with Otto Lilienthal through the German Association for the Promotion of Aviation, where he gave a lecture on cloud photography and which he joined in January 1892. In the autumn of 1891 he accompanied Lilienthal to Derwitz and took a series of photographs of his gliding flights. Kassner was thus the first person to photograph a person floating freely in the air. Lilienthal used the photographs in a lecture at the association on November 16, 1891. Photos from 1891 show that Kassner himself also attempted to fly with one of Lilienthal's aircraft, which Lilienthal documented photographically. In the 1890s, Kassner took part in several scientific balloon flights organized by the Association for the Promotion of Airship Travel and took "sensational cloud photos".

Kassner received his doctorate in 1893 with his dissertation Über kreisähnliche Zyklonen at the Friedrich-Wilhelms University in Berlin. He worked on the cyclone track analyses carried out by van Bebber and in particular analyzed the van Bebber Vb track, taking into account weak and small-scale low-pressure areas. He also evaluated the station data from the Crkvice meteorological measuring station in what was then the southern Austrian coastal region in what is now Montenegro. Here, he found the rainiest place in Europe on the eastern slope of the Orjen Mountains from the precipitation data.

From 1901, in addition to his work at the Prussian Meteorological Institute, Kassner was a private lecturer at the Royal Technical University of Charlottenburg. Three years later, he was appointed professor of meteorology in the Department of Civil Engineering. From 1922, he was a non-tenured extraordinary professor of meteorology at the Faculty of General Sciences, Department of Physics.

After the outbreak of the First World War, Kassner was one of the signatories of the Declaration of the University Teachers of the German Empire of 16 October 1914. In 1915, he was one of the driving forces in the nationalist Germanization Commission, which was directed against everything French and English.

Between the turn of the century and the First World War, Kassner had travelled throughout almost all of Europe, Asia Minor and Algeria.

In 1915 he published a study of Bulgaria, which he had visited twelve times by then. When Bulgaria entered the war on the side of the Central Powers in the First World War, the Germans developed a great enthusiasm for the country, which was still hardly known to the wider community. Even after the war, Kassner was an important advocate for the Balkan state as deputy director and later honorary member of the German-Bulgarian Society, giving public lectures about the country and its people. He was a corresponding member of the Bulgarian Academy of Sciences and holder of the Officer 's Cross of the Bulgarian Order of Civil Merit with Crown.

In 1919, Kassner created the world's first weather film. This film showed the movement of Vb cyclones using weather maps.

From 1907 to 1922 he was the first secretary of the German Meteorological Society . He was also a member of the Geographical Society and the Gustav Adolf Society.

Kassner was married. The marriage to Antoinette Müller was concluded on 19 October 1893.

== Selected works ==
- Über kreisähnliche Zyklonen. Inaugural-Dissertation, Berlin 1893
- Über die Zugstraße Vb. In: Meteorologische Zeitschrift. Band 32, 1897, S. 219–222
- Das regenreichste Gebiet Europas. In: Petermanns Geographische Mitteilungen. Band 50, Nr. 4, 1904, S. 281–285
- Das Wetter und seine Bedeutung für das praktische Leben. Leipzig 1908
- Das Reich der Wolken und Niederschläge. Leipzig 1909 (Digitalisat)
- Die meteorologischen Grundlagen des Städtebaues. Berlin 1910
- Bulgarien. Land und Leute. Leipzig 1916
- Der Einfluß Berlins als Großstadt auf die Schneeverhältnisse. In: Meteorologische Zeitschrift. Band 34, 1917, S. 136–137
- Gerichtliche und Verwaltungs-Meteorologie. Das Wetter in der Rechtsprechung für Gerichte und Rechtsanwälte, Verwaltungen, Magistrate und Hausbesitzer, Berufsgenossenschaften und Versicherungsgesellschaften, für Gewerbe, Handel und Technik. Berlin und Leipzig 1921
- Geschichte der Deutschen Meteorologischen Gesellschaft 1883–1933 zur Feier des fünfzigjährigen Bestehens. Berlin 1933
