= Stefano Zannowich =

Montenegrin Serb writer and adventurer

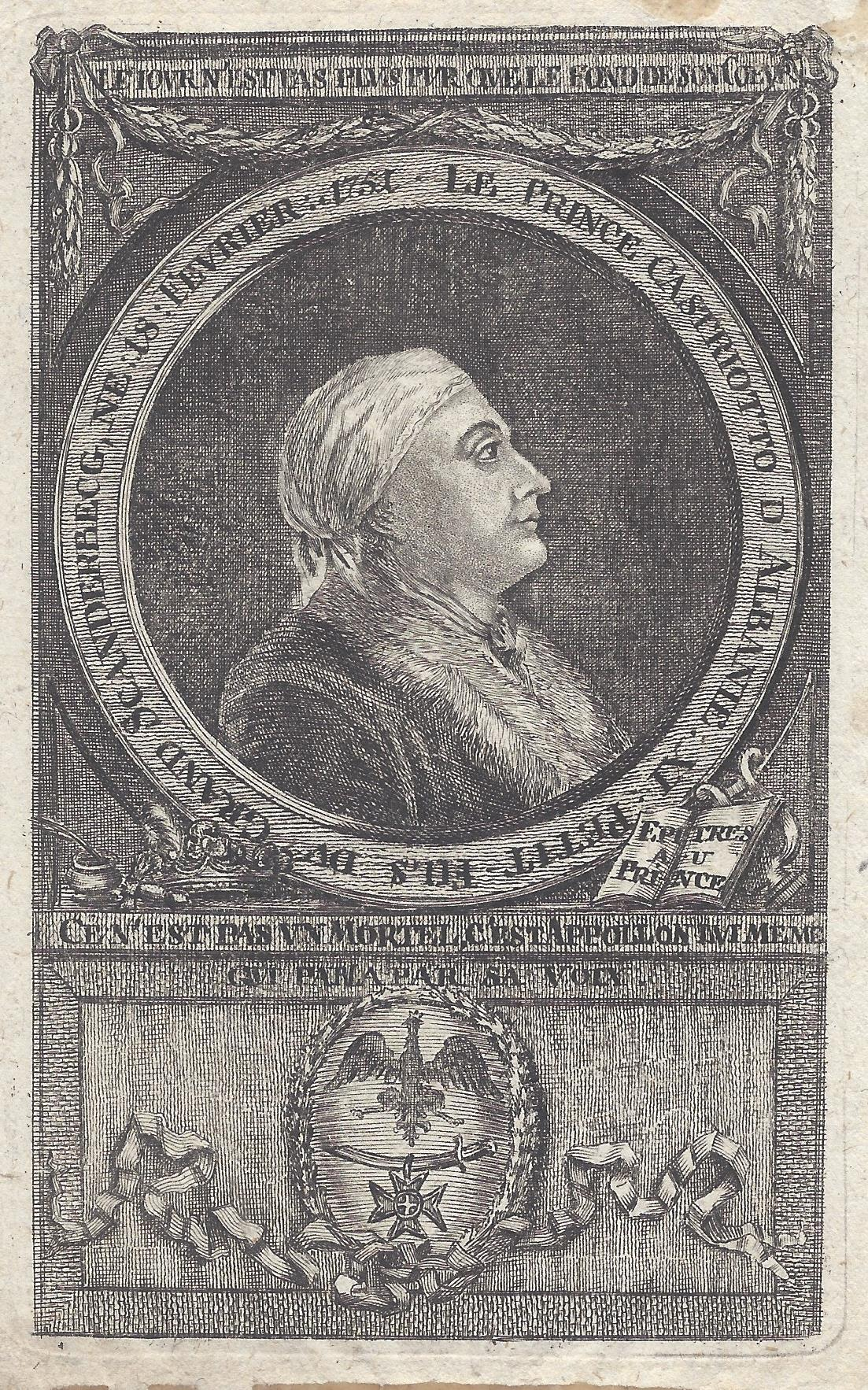
Stefano Zannowich, etching around 1780

Stefano Zannowich (Serbo-Croatian: Stefan or Stjepan Zanović, Стефан Зановић; Budva, Montenegro, 18 February 1751 – Amsterdam, Netherlands, then known as the Dutch Republic, 25 May 1786) was an adventurer from Budva (modern-day Montenegro) who achieved significant notoriety for his impersonation of royalty. His most notable published work was the 1776 "Turkish Letters".

== Biography ==
Zannowich's life is full of controversy, scarce on facts, and filled with fictional events that were most likely products of his own imagination. Various fragments were recorded by his acquaintances.

=== Birth ===
Zanović was born in 1751 in Budva, which was part of Venetia, now known as Montenegro. He was born in Paštrovići, the fourth child of Antun Zanović, a wealthy merchant and shoemaker, and his wife Franka (née Marković). His father was known as Budaljanin or Buduan in Venice, indicating his origin in Budva.

=== Siblings ===
He had older brothers named Marko (b. 1745), Primislav (b. 1747), and his namesake Stjepan (b. 1749), who died at an early age. After Stjepan, his parents had Vincislav (b. 1755) and Miroslav (1761-1834), as well as two daughters, Marija Jelisaveta (b. 1753) and Teresia Giustiniana (b. 1758).

The large number of siblings allowed them to constantly change identities, falsely impersonating one another, often creating confusion by allegedly appearing in two places at the same time. His oldest brother Marko went to Imperial Russia in 1781 and became a count, living on the estate of Serbian-Russian count Semyon Zorich in Shklow. In 1783, both Marko and Anibal, his brother, were arrested for their involvement in his brother's money counterfeiting operation. Anibal is not the same person as Stjepan; it is more likely that Primislav used the same alias. They were imprisoned in Siberia until 1788 when they were pardoned by Catherine the Great due to Zorich's intervention and Stjepan's fame in Western Europe, where he always glorified the Russian empress. After their release, they left for Arhangelsk and were not mentioned again.

His youngest brother Miroslav also adopted the title of count and became involved in politics as a staunch opponent of Venetian aspirations towards Dalmatia. He was a delegate of Budva at the unification assembly of Montenegro and Boka in 1813. He also published the book Thoughts and Sonnets and died at a very old age in 1834.

Among all his relatives, Stjepan, alongside Primislav, who was often his partner in con schemes, is perhaps the best known.

=== Early years ===
Apparently, at the age of 17, after committing a robbery, he escaped to Dalmatia and became a brigand leader. Stefan completed his education in Venice and Padua. He met Casanova through his brother Primislav in Florence, where he was part of the Accademia degli Apatisti, later known as the Accademia Fiorentina. In Florence, he made his first move by bankrupting an English lord in a card game, for which he was expelled. In 1769, both he and his brother were expelled from Venice, and the following year, they were expelled from Treviso for document forgery and false representation. Somewhere after 1772, he undertook a trip to London to collect his card winnings. During this voyage, he visited many parts of France, including Marseille, Aix-en-Provence, Lyon, and eventually Paris, where he moved in social circles around Encyclopédistes, thus meeting d'Alembert, Marmontel, and Rousseau. His first works Opera diverse and Poesie were printed in 1773 in Paris and Milan, respectively.

=== Attempts to gain power in Montenegro ===
Later, he came to Montenegro where, according to his own account, he presented himself as Russian Tsar Peter III and became the head of the country. Zannowich did visit Montenegro on 5 May 1774, with unclear motives. Obviously seeking to profit from the power vacuum after the death of Stephen the Little, the actual impostor of Peter III, he later assumed his identity and presented himself across Europe as the man who caused such political intrigue. It is widely regarded as true that he actually met Stephen, even writing a few words about him in 1784, in which he made a clear distinction between the two of them. In the passage, he mentioned himself as being one of Stephen's generals in the latter's battles against the Turks. After the supposed meeting, he left Montenegro for the first time in 1769 to go to Vienna, only to return five years later.

While in Vienna, he tried to gain support from local Orthodox deacons for his plan to seize power in Montenegro, and it is at this point that he began his quest to prove his noble heritage (he had claimed descent from Skanderbeg). He reported that the people of Montenegro, as well as Prince-Bishop Sava, were asking him to take over the country, but his adventurous spirit longed for something more. In reality, he was expelled by Montenegrins who wanted to avoid being deceived by yet another impostor. So, he left the country for the second time, accompanied by Archimandrite Petar I, who would later become metropolitan himself, and a group of Montenegrins. They reached Vienna through Rijeka, and once in Vienna, he parted ways with his traveling group.

=== 'Niarta' alias ===
Via Strasbourg and Frankfurt, he went to Poland. There, he took on the alias Niarta and became the protégé of Prince Michał Kazimierz Ogiński, whom he exploited financially. In 1775, he went to Dresden, where his works Opere Postume and Lettere turche were printed. The following year, he moved to Berlin, where he failed to gain the trust of Frederick the Great but grew increasingly close to Frederick William II, his heir. Johann Christian von Mannlich recounts how well he was received in Zweibrücken in 1778, only to be arrested and denied a residence permit after an incriminating letter against him arrived from Berlin. Spending some time under various false identities in Alsace and Lorraine, he arrived in Rome, where he started an affair with the Duchess of Kingston despite their age difference. The pair then left for Russia.

=== Return to Montenegro power grab plans ===
In 1780, he was in Groningen, and he moved to Amsterdam, eventually ending up in Antwerp. There, he befriended Charles-Joseph de Ligne, who dedicated a poem to Stefan and spent six months enjoying his hospitality at Château de Belœil. During his stay in Belgium, clearly unwilling to abandon his political ambitions involving Montenegro, he devised a plan to place the country under the protection of Joseph II, whose intervention saved him from prison in Vienna in 1778. He claimed to be able to assemble up to 10,000 Montenegrins ready to fight for the emperor's interests in the Austrian Netherlands. Stefan's plot collapsed while he was in Ath, from where he left once again for Frankfurt, where he resided from 19 March to 12 June in 1784. Living off various hoaxes and frauds, he collected 5,764 Dutch guilders from a bank in Amsterdam on 11 August 1784, using a false promissory note from the Duchess of Kingston.

=== Time at Frauenbrünnl Monastery ===
He arrived at Frauenbrünnl Monastery in Abbach near Straubing and presented himself as an exiled prince seeking sanctuary and peace. He spent some time there, making it his seat of operations. He regularly visited Augsburg, Regensburg, and Munich, establishing contacts with wealthy merchants and persuading them to enter the Dutch market where he had considerable influence. During his time in Frauenbrünnl, he rarely left his room and often made generous contributions to the poor locals. He also went by the name of Hanibal.

=== Stefano Zannowich in writing ===
He had pen pals such as Gluck, Pietro Metastasio, Voltaire, Jean le Rond d'Alembert, Jean-Jacques Rousseau, Catherine the Great, and Frederick William II of Prussia, to whom he dedicated a book of French verses translated from Italian, "L'Alcoran des Princes Destinés au Trone".

Giacomo Casanova mentions Stefano Zannovich, who "paid a visit to Vienna under the alias of Prince Castriotto d'Albanie. Under pressure from the authorities, he left at the end of July 1784" for Poland and later for the Netherlands (United Provinces).

=== Death ===
Stefano Zannowich died in Amsterdam, in the Dutch Republic.

== Work ==
He wrote in Italian, French, Latin, German, and Serbian.

The most important work was Lettere turche (lit. 'Turkish Letters'), first published in Dresden in 1776. Serbian literary historiography never treated them as a novelist. With the latest research and study, Zannowich's work now belongs to the genre of an epistolary novel, a form especially popular in the Age of Enlightenment.

- La Didone, scena drammatica. Ottava edizione (1772)
- Opere Diverse (1773)
- Pigmalione (1773)
- Riflessioni filosofiche-morali (1773)
- Lettere turche (1776)
- Le Grand Castriotto d' Albanie (Paris 1779)
- La poésie et la philosophie d'un Turc (1779)
- L'Horoscope politique de la Pologne, de la Prusse, de l'Angleterre, etc. (1779)
- L'Anima, poema filosofico (?)
- Epîtres pathétiques addressées à Frédéric-Guillaume, Prince-royal de Prusse (1780)
- Correspondence Littéraire Secrète (1786)
- Histoire de la vie et des aventures de la duchesse de Kingston (1789)

== Legacy ==
At the turn of the 20th century, Pavel Rovinski, a long-time expatriate in Montenegro, published a short monograph on Zanović. In 1904, Mirko Breyer included Zanović in his lexicon of Croatian literary and cultural history. In 1928, he wrote a monograph about the Zanović family, which was published by Matica hrvatska. This work proved to be a seminal piece that generated significant interest in Zanović, attracting attention from notable figures such as Vladimir Nazor, Milo Dor, Radoslav Rotković, Miroslav Pantić and Petar Džadžić.

There is a story about Stefano Zannowich in Alfred Döblin's 1929 novel Berlin Alexanderplatz.

In 1998, Budva High School organized an international assembly of literary critics dedicated to Zanović. The event was attended by Gojko Čelebić, Zlata Bojović, Ilona Czamańska, Bogusław Zieliński, Radomir V. Ivanović, and others.

The Croatian Encyclopedia describes him as a "Croatian writer and adventurer". Serbian historian Michael M. Petrovich traced the Zenović or Zenovich family from the Paštrović clan emigrating during or after the Napoleonic Wars to North America, first settling in Louisiana and later in California.

== See also ==
- Tomo Medin

== Sources ==
- Breyer, Mirko (1904). "O pustolovu Stjepanu Zanoviću, Budvaninu". Prilozi k starijoj književnoj i kulturnoj povjesti hrvatskoj (in Croatian). U nakladi vlastite knjižare. pp. 107–157.
- Žic, Nikola (1934). "Nepoznata pjesma Miroslava Zanovića". Narodna starina (in Croatian). 13 (33). Croatian State Archives: 101.
- Breyer, Mirko (2020) [1928]. Baljević, Mila; Ljubanović, Gordana; Simonović, Maja (eds.). Antun conte Zanović i njegovi sinovi (PDF). Budva: JU Narodna Biblioteka Budve.
- Jelušić, Božena (2020). "Kulturno-književni istoričar Mirko Breyer u traganju za Zanovićima" (PDF). In Baljević, Mila; Ljubanović, Gordana; Simonović, Maja (eds.). Antun conte Zanović i njegovi sinovi (by Mirko Breyer). Budva: JU Narodna Biblioteka Budve.
