= Vasos Mavrovouniotis =

Montenegrin Serb general

Vasos Mavrovouniotis Βάσος Μαυροβουνιώτης
- Васо Брајoвић
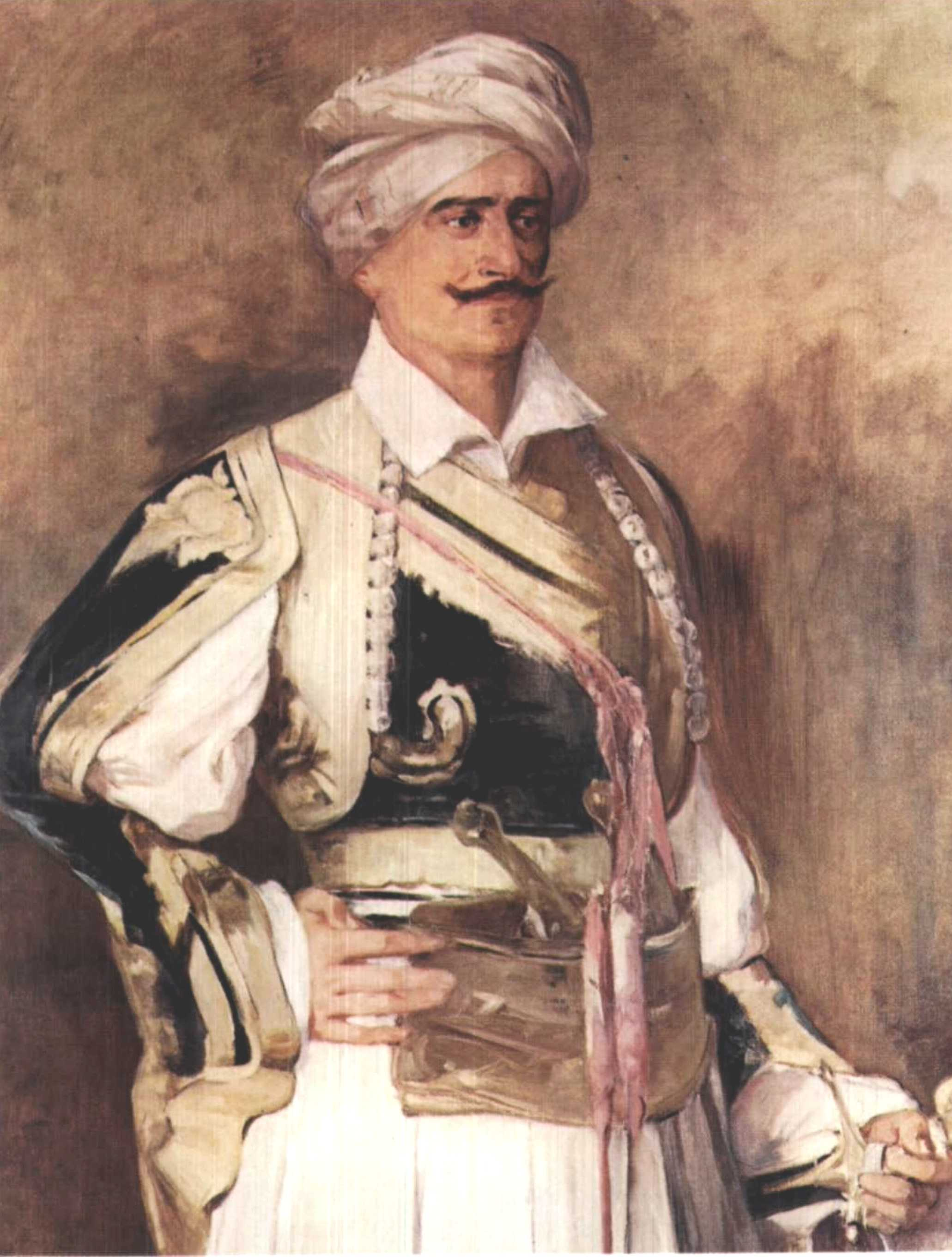
- Oil painting by Nikiforos Lytras
- Born: Vaso Brajović; 1797; Mojdež, Republic of Venice or Bjelopavlići (both in present-day Montenegro)
- Died: 9 June 1847 (aged 49–50); Athens, Kingdom of Greece
- Spouse: Eleni Vassou
- Children: Timoleon Vassos; Alexandros Vassos
- Military career
- Allegiance: First Hellenic Republic; Kingdom of Greece
- Branch: Greek Revolutionary Army; Hellenic Army
- Conflicts: Greek War of Independence: Greek civil wars of 1823-1825
- Other work: Member of the Privy Council; Adjutant to King Otto

Vasos Mavrovouniotis (Greek: Βάσος Μαυροβουνιώτης, literally "Vasos the Montenegrin"; 1797 – 9 June 1847), born as Vaso Brajović (Serbian: Васо Брајoвић), was a Montenegrin Serb general who played a significant role in the Greek revolution against the Ottoman Empire in 1821.

== Life ==
=== Origin and early life ===
Mavrovouniotis was born in either Mojdež or in the Bjelopavlići plain, (both in modern-day Montenegro), as Vaso Brajović. Virtually all the historians of the Greek War of Independence agree that he was of Slavic ancestry, although some of them state he had Greek roots. He was a member of the prominent military family of Brajović – and possessed military skills. He went to the maritime school in Herceg Novi, where he excelled.

He was given the nickname Mavrovouniotis or Mavrovouniota, "Montenegrin" (Васо Црногорац), in Greece.

=== Greek Revolution ===
In 1821, he led a force of 120 Montenegrins and Greeks, and joined the early stages of the Greek revolution. His first stop was in central Greece where he met with the Greek Nikolaos Kriezotis, an old time fellow warrior, leader of the Greek Revolution in Euboea, with whom he was a "Vlami" (a spiritual brother, an ancient Balkan practice of blood brotherhood). In 1822, he participated in the fight against the Turks in Athens where he showed bravery and was widely accepted as one of the best fighters of its period.

In 1824, a Greek civil war erupted and Mavrovouniotis joined forces with the government mainly composed of Greeks he knew since the early stages of the revolution. For his commitment to the side that finally won the domestic conflict he was assigned the rank of General and was given a force of 1,500 men; a considerable army at that period. In the period between 1826–27 he was one of the few guerilla fighters not to be defeated by the Egyptian forces led by Ibrahim Pasha, that nearly destroyed the Greek forces. He participated in a failed Greek expedition in Cyprus and Lebanon in March 1826 aiming at inciting a revolt in those areas.

=== Service in the Kingdom of Greece ===
In the newly established Greek state in 1830s he became a member of the elite that surrounded the first Greek King Otto, prince of Bavaria. He was both a member of the Privy Council and adjutant to King Otto. He died on 9 June 1847 and was widely admired by the Greek people as one of the leaders of the Cause and as one of the leading figures of the independent state. During his military career he had a leading role in thirty six battles and had suffered many injuries, including a penetrating wound in his chest.

A dagger belonging to Mavrovouniotis is displayed at the National Museum of Athens. The bayonet-like object on the left (charbi, χαρμπί) was used as knife sharpener or muzzleloader. The dagger on the right bears the inscription (in Greek): "Fighting holy battles for his friend Greece. Vassos Mavrovoniotes".

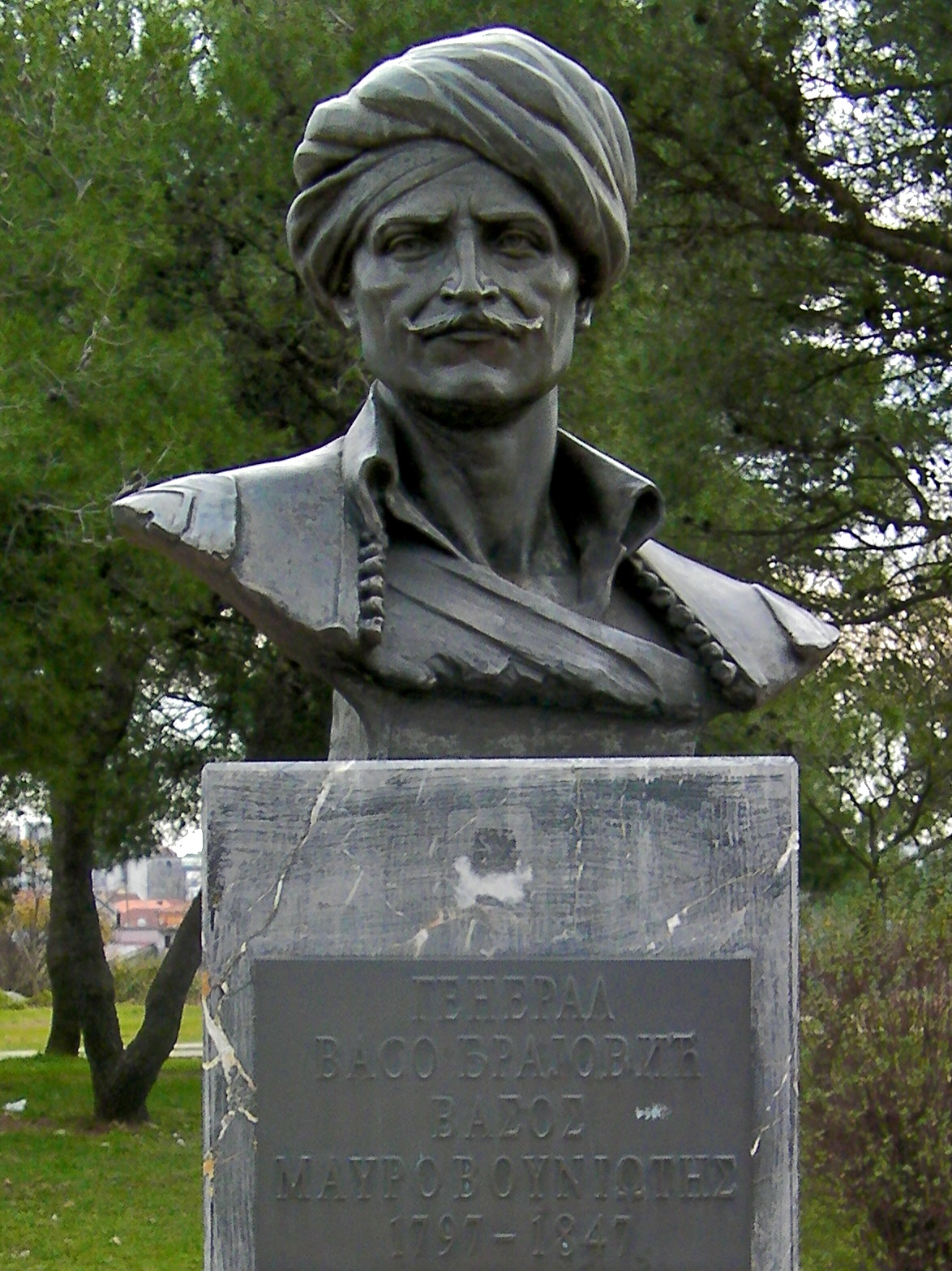
Monument to Vasos Mavrovouniotis in Podgorica.

== Family ==
Mavrovouniotis married Helena Pangalou from the well known Pangalos family, in 1826. Helena followed him throughout the harsh campaigns in the Greek mountains against the Turks. She died in 1891 and they had two sons, Alexandros and Timoleon, both of whom became generals in the Greek Army.

== See also ==
- Hadži Prodan Gligorijević, Serbian revolutionary in the First Serbian Uprising that joined the Greek War
- Giorgakis Olympios (1772–1821), fellow Greek revolutionary in the First Serbian Uprising and Greek War
- Serb volunteers in the Greek War of Independence
- Media related to Vasos Mavrovouniotis at Wikimedia Commons

== Sources ==
- Papageorgiou, Stefanos P. (2014). "Vasos Mavrovouniotes" (PDF). Mediterranea-ricerche Storiche (32): 463–488.
- Whitcombe, Thomas Douglas; Eliot, Charles William James (1992). Campaign of the Falieri and Piraeus in the Year 1827, Or, Journal of a Volunteer, Being the Personal Account of Captain Thomas Douglas Whitcombe. ASCSA. pp. 175–. ISBN 978-0-87661-405-1.
- Chrysologis, Athanasios (1876). "The Greek Fight: Vassos Mavrovouniotes, a talk given at the "Byron" Philologic Society, Athens, Jan. 8th, 1876".
