= Thirteenth of July Award =

Highest State Honor of Montenegro

- Native name: Trinaestojulska Nagrada
- Type: State Distinction
- Awarded for: Notable works in the fields of Science, Arts, Culture, Sports & Economy
- Date: Montenegro Statehood Day (13th of July)
- Country: Montenegro
- Eligibility: Citizens of Montenegro and Organizations based in Montenegro
- First award: 2005
- Final award: 2025

Highlights
- Total: 62

The Thirteenth of July Award (Montenenegrin:Trinaestojulska nagrada) is the highest state distinction in Montenegro and the most prestigious award of the country, awarded to individuals and organizations in the fields of Science, Art, Culture, Sports and Economy, conferred on the Montenegrin Statehood Day in July 13th.

== Award ==
The award is divided in 2 forms: The Annual Award, awarded every year to 3 individuals/organizations whose specific work (Books, Research) is deemed of exceptional importance to Montenegrin Culture, Art, Sports, Science or Economy, and the Lifetime Achievement Award, awarded to individuals whose entire body of work represents outstanding contributions to Montenegrin Culture, Art, Sport, Science or Economy.

The recipients of the awards are selected by a Jury Panel, which reviews a list of nominees across the fields of Science, Art, Culture, Sport and Economy. By Montenegrin law, no more than one award should be given per field in a given year.

== Recipients ==
Lifetime Achievement Award
Year	Recipient
2012	Marina Abramović
2014	Vojo Stanić
2016	Veljko Bulajić
2018	Vukić Pulević
2024	Dragan Koprivica

Annual Award
Year	Recipient 1	Recipient 2	Recipient 3
2005	Pero Lompar	Vukić Pulević	Žuvdija Hodzic
2007	Božidar Ivanović	Veljko Radović	Mladen Lompar
2009	Rajko Todorović	Team Of Authors Consisting on Goran Radović, Aleksandar Keković & Slavica Stamatović.	CID Publishing House
2010	Luka Lagator	Radoslav Rotković	Primorac Water Polo Club
2011	Slobodan Milatović	Žarko Mirković	Šerbo Rastoder
2012	Branko Baletić	Budućnost Women`s Handball Club	13th of July Vineyard
2013	Radul Knežević	Ilija Lakušić	Gojko Čelebić
2014	Gojko Kastratović	Aleksandar Čilikov	Niko Martinović
2015	Ljubomir Đurković	Vesna Kilibarda	Srđan Vukčević
2016	Mladin Šobić	Milorad Popović	Igor Đurović
2017	Miodrag Šćepanović	David Kalaj	Svetozar Savić
2018	Krsto Andrijašević	Aleksa Asanović	Adnan Čirgić
2019	Dragan Perović	Božidar Sekularac	Pavle Goranović
2020	Institute of Public Health of Montenegro	Ranko Lazović	Živko Andrijašević
2021	Tomo Pavićević	Srđan Bulatović	Darko Nikčević
2022	Jelena Tomašević	Senad Gačević	Andrei Nikolaidis
2023	Roman Simović	Naod Zorić	Predrag Uljarević
2024	Andrija Radulović	Branislav Sekulić	Nikola Marojević
2025	Miloš Karadaglić (Note: Karadaglic publicly rejected the award)	Bećir Vuković	Veljo Stanišić
