= Asanovic =

Asanović is a surname. Notable people with the surname include:

- Aleksa Asanovic (born 1945), Montenegrin musician
- Aljoša Asanović (born 1965), Croatian footballer
- Antonio Asanović (born 1991), Croatian footballer
- Krste Asanovic, American engineer
- Sreten Asanović (1931–2016), Montenegrin author
- Tihomir "Pop" Asanović (born 1948), Croatian keyboardist, Hammond organ player and composer
