= Andrija Radulović =

Andrija Radulović may refer to:

- Andrija Radulović (poet), Montenegrin poet (born 1970)
- Andrija Radulović (footballer), Montenegrin football player (born 2002)
