= Timoleon Vassos =

Greek Army officer and general

- Τιμολέων Βάσσος or Βάσος
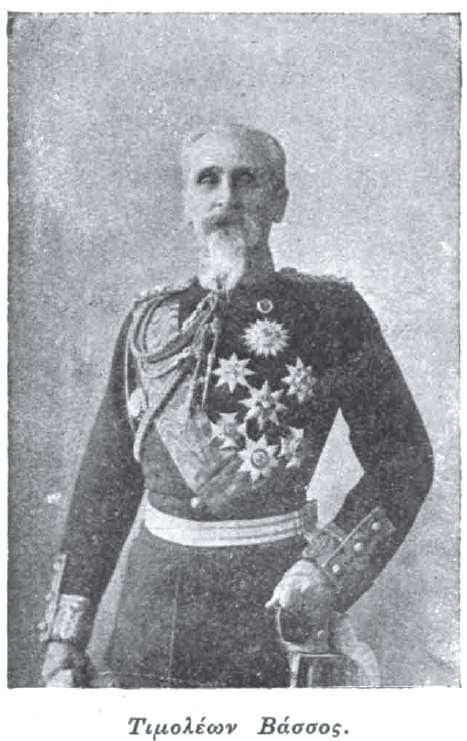
- Timoleon Vassos c. 1914
- Born: c. 1836; Athens, Kingdom of Greece
- Died: c. 1929 (aged 92–93); Athens, Second Hellenic Republic
- Alma mater: Hellenic Military Academy
- Relatives: Vasos Mavrovouniotis (Father); Alexandros Vasos (Brother)
- Military career
- Allegiance: Kingdom of Greece
- Branch: Hellenic Army
- Rank: Major General
- Commands: Garrison Commander of Athens
- Wars: Greco-Turkish War (1897); Cretan Revolt
- Other work: Aide-de-Camp to King George I

Timoleon Vassos or Vasos (Greek: Τιμολέων Βάσσος or Βάσος; c. 1836–1929) was a Hellenic Army officer and general.

He was born in Athens in 1836, the younger son of the hero of the Greek Revolution Vasos Mavrovouniotis. He studied at the Hellenic Military Academy and continued his studies in France before being appointed as aide de camp to King George I. In February 1897, as a colonel, he was sent at the head of an expeditionary force to Crete to assist the local Cretan revolt against the Ottoman Empire, an act which precipitated the outbreak of the Greco-Turkish War of 1897. He eventually reached the rank of Major General and garrison commander of Athens.

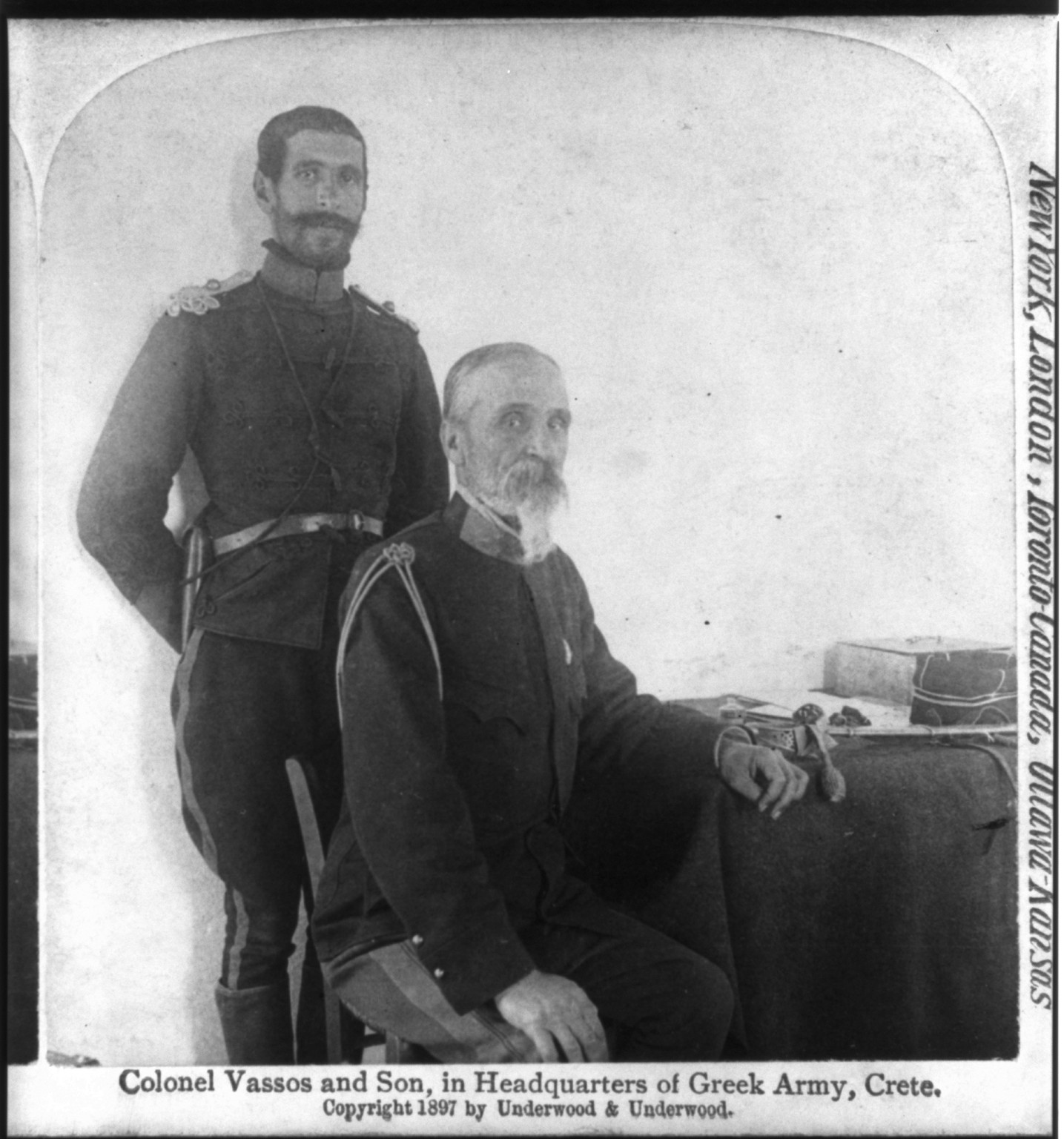
Timoleon Vassos and his son in Crete c. 1897

He died in Athens in October 1929.
