= Radoslav Rotković =

Montenegrin historian, philologist (1928–2013)

- Радослав Ротковић
- Born: 30 May 1928; Mojdež, Kingdom of Serbs, Croats and Slovenes
- Died: 8 September 2013 (aged 85); Risan, Montenegro
- Education: University of Zagreb; University of Belgrade
- Occupations: Historian, philologist, academician
- Known for: Montenegrin history
- Notable work: Flag of Montenegro; Montenegrin literary heritage (1976); Odakle su došli preci Crnogoraca (1995); A great conspiracy against Montenegro (2001); Njegoš and Croats (2011)
- Awards: Thirteenth of July Award (2010), Order of Labour with Golden Wreath (1984)

Radoslav Rotković (Montenegrin Cyrillic: Радослав Ротковић; 30 May 1928 – 8 September 2013) was a Montenegrin historian, philologist and academician. He is known for his works in Montenegrin history and literature.

== Biography ==
Rotković was born in the village of Mojdež in Herceg Novi in the year 1928. He graduated from the University of Zagreb in 1953. He started working in 1954 as a editor in the Pobjeda Newspaper. He worked multiple jobs after that, including as the editor-in-chief of Titograd TV between 1966 and 1980. In 1974, he graduated from the University of Belgrade, and in 1979, he received his doctorate from the University of Zagreb.

He was the director of the Department of Social Sciences of the Lexicographic Institute of Montenegro until 1990, and he served as a representative of the Liberal Alliance of Montenegro in parliament between 1992 and 1998. In 2010, he was awarded the Thirteenth of July Award for his book in linguistic studies.

He died in 2013 in Risan, Kotor, from an illness.

== Works ==
Work	Year
Montenegrin literary heritage	1976
Overview of Montenegrin literature from the earliest times to 1918	1979
Looking for Ljubiša	1982
Creation of Cetinje, sources and legends	1984
Contemporary drama and theater in Montenegro	1987
Where did the ancestors of Montenegrins come from	1995
A short or organized history of the Montenegrin people	1996
Montenegro and Dušan's empire	1997
Kingdom of Vojislavljević, collection of sources and legends	1999
Forms and ranges of bococcal representations	2000
Battle of Vučje dol	2000
A great conspiracy against Montenegro	2001
Linguistic studies	2010
Theater without a house	2011
Njegoš and Croats: on the occasion of the 200th anniversary of the birth of Petar II Petrović Njegoš	2011
History of Montenegrin literature, volume 2, From the beginning of literacy to 1852.	2012
