= Miloš Karadaglić =

Classical guitarist from Montenegro

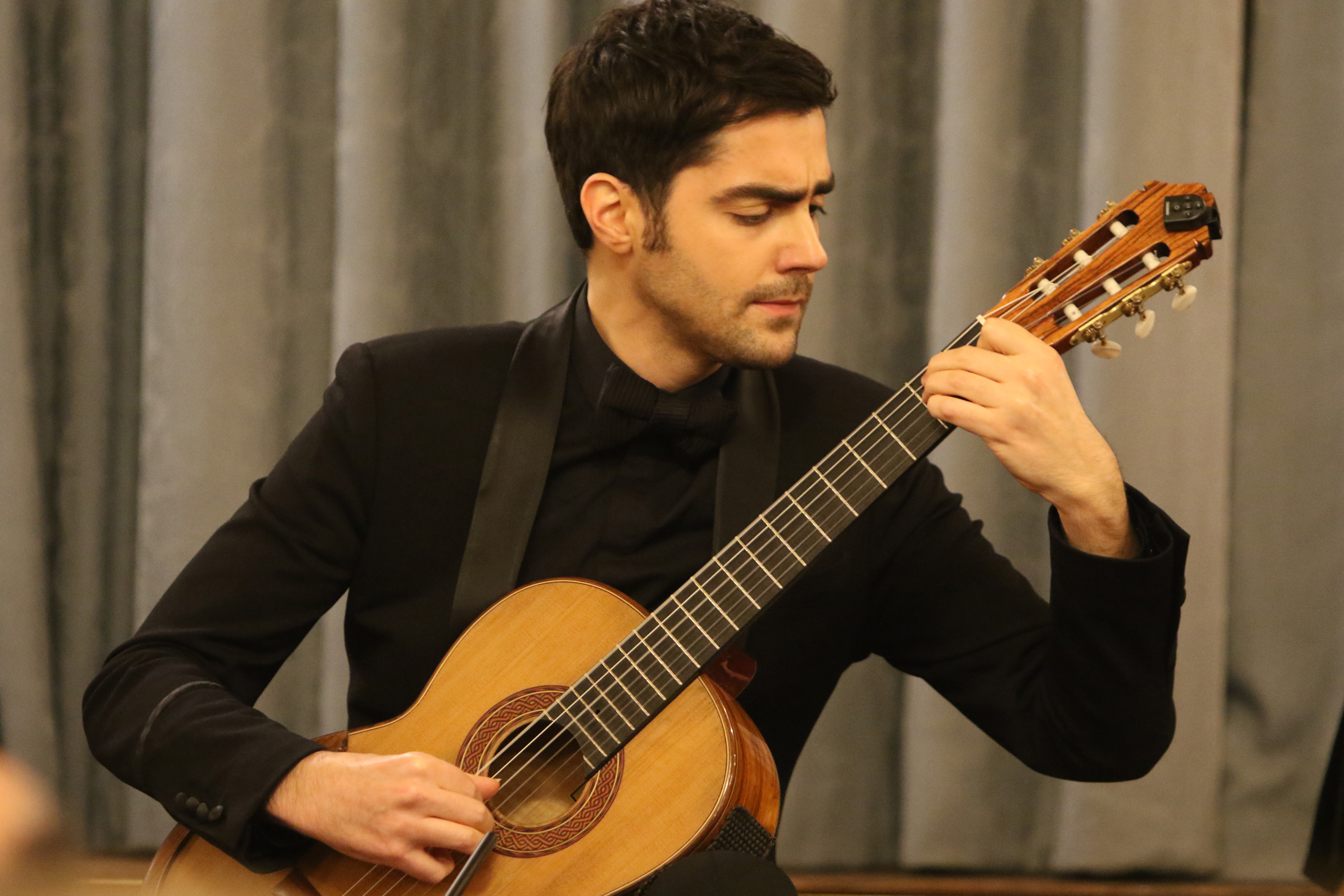

Background information
- Born: Miloš Karadaglić; 23 April 1983 (age 43); SR Montenegro, SFR Yugoslavia
- Genre: Classical guitar
- Occupation: Musician
- Instrument: Guitar
- Years active: 2011–present
- Labels: Deutsche Grammophon; Decca; Sony Classical
- Website: milosguitar.com

Miloš Karadaglić (Cyrillic: Милош Карадаглић, born 23 April 1983), sometimes known mononymously as Miloš, is a Montenegrin classical guitarist and Sony Classical recording artist. He was born in Montenegro and currently lives and works in the United Kingdom.

== Biography ==
Karadaglić first started playing the guitar at the age of eight. By the time he was a teenager, the Yugoslav Wars were raging and, although Montenegro was spared from direct conflict, its citizens were isolated from the rest of Europe. When he was 17 years old, Karadaglić successfully applied for a scholarship at the Royal Academy of Music by sending a video tape he recorded at home. He moved to London in September 2000, where he has continued to live ever since.

Kara (dark) dağ (mountain) means Montenegro in Turkish. Karadaglić is the Slavic form of the Turkish surname (Karadağlı) meaning a person from Montenegro. In public, Karadaglić is most commonly referred to by his first name alone.

== Career ==
Karadaglić signed an exclusive recording contract to Deutsche Grammophon in 2010. His career began its meteoric rise in 2011 with the release of his debut album Mediterráneo (titled The Guitar for the UK market), topping the classical charts around the world and turning him into "classical music's guitar hero" (the Telegraph). The album stayed #1 in the UK classical chart for 28 weeks. That same year he won the prestigious Gramophone Young Artist of the Year and Echo Klassik Newcomer of the Year awards.

Gramophone, reviewing the record, commented: "Karadaglić is a guitarist of superior musical and technical gifts who allows his personality to sing through the music with taste and intelligence". Geoffrey Norris of The Daily Telegraph said: "The playing is lithe, subtle of timbre and transcendentally beautiful."

In 2012, he was named Classic BRIT MasterCard Breakthrough Artist of the Year for his second release of Latin American solo guitar music titled Latino.

2012 was a breakthrough year on the concert stage for Karadaglić, with sold-out performances and tours in the UK, France, Netherlands, Switzerland, USA, Canada, Korea, Japan, Hong Kong and Australia.

"Part of the reason Karadaglić has such a large following" commented The West Australian, "is his ability to straddle both hardcore classical and pop classical camps." This was echoed by the London press following his celebrated Royal Albert Hall debut about which The Guardian commented: "More extraordinary by far, however, was the way a single guitarist, playing an intimate and understated set, and equipped with a single microphone and some clever lighting, could shrink the Hall's cavernous space into something so close." The Independent wrote: "Defying its many critics to offer a dramatic and rounded evening of classical music, the guitar itself was the breakout star here – a sleight of hand that makes Karadaglić not only a magician, but a serious and accomplished musician".

The success of Latino/Pasión led to a new 2013 release entitled Latino Gold featuring thirty minutes of newly recorded tracks from a wealth of Latin America-inspired music. Sergio Assad created arrangements for some of the key tracks on the album.

The 2014 Deutsche Grammophon recording titled Aranjuez, with Joaquin Rodrigo's two most famous guitar concertos, Concierto de Aranjuez and Fantasia para un Gentilhombre, conducted by Yannick Nezet-Seguin and the London Philharmonic Orchestra had the Sunday Times calling him "The King of Aranjuez".

"Blackbird- the Beatles Album" was released in 2016. Recorded in the famous Abbey Road Studio 2, it features classic Beatles songs performed in innovative new arrangements by Sérgio Assad and includes collaborations with the jazz legend Gregory Porter, pop singer Tori Amos, cellist Steven Isserlis and sitar superstar Anoushka Shankar.

In 2016 BBC Music Magazine included Miloš in their list of Six best classical guitarists. He was featured on the cover of the BBC Music Magazine in the same year.

Karadaglić describes his 2019 Decca Classics album Sound of Silence as, 'a personal scrapbook of popular music that will always have a special meaning to me.'

The Moon & the Forest was released in 2021, also on Decca Classics, and features world premiere recordings of Howard Shore and Joby Talbot's concertos for guitar written especially for him. Talbot concerto was premiered at the BBC Proms Festival at the Royal Albert Hall in August 2018.

Karadaglić has appeared as a soloist with some of the world's greatest orchestras: London and LA Philharmonics, Atlanta Symphony, Philadelphia Orchestra, Chicago Symphony, Cleveland Orchestra, Orquesta Nacional de España, Santa Cecilia Rome, NHK Tokyo, Munich Philharmonic, Oslo Philharmonic, Detroit Symphony.

Karadaglić returned to the Royal Albert Hall post-pandemic in June 2022, playing "in the round" to a full capacity audience. He was a soloist with the Frankfurt Radio Symphony in August 2023 for their annual Europa Open Air, playing Concierto de Aranjuez before more than sixteen thousand people, broadcast live on German national television. His international stage debut happened in 2008, at the Luzern Festival.

In 2025, he was nominated for the prestigious Montenegrin Thirteenth of July award, but he refused to receive it for political reasons.

=== Sony Classical ===
In 2022 Karadaglić signed a new long term exclusive contract with Sony Classical, signalling the beginning of a new chapter in his career.

Baroque, Karadaglić's seventh studio album and first for Sony, was released in October 2023 to universal acclaim. The track list is a carefully curated selection of baroque works especially transcribed and arranged for the guitar, both solo and in collaboration with Jonathan Cohen and his ensemble Arcangelo. Gramophone Magazine said, "'Baroque' is … Miloš' most virtuosic album to date…. He asks the famous question, 'Sonata, what do you want of me?' and listens for an answer before communicating it to us in the clearest, most elegant and most moving fashion."

=== Philanthropy ===
Karadaglić is a patron of numerous charities supporting young musicians in the UK and abroad, including the London Music Fund and the charity Young Sounds UK.^{[13]}

He recently launched the "Miloš Foundation". Based in Porto Montenegro, this philanthropic organisation aims to act as a regional hub of influence by empowering artistic excellence though various educational opportunities, partnerships and close mentorship.

=== Publishing ===
In 2018, Schott Music published a new series of 4 classical guitar books, titled "Play Guitar with Miloš", where he teaches classical guitar using the pieces he has played and enjoyed throughout his career.

=== Personal life ===
Karadaglić lives in Battersea, London. He keeps close ties to his homeland, Montenegro. He plays on a 2017 Greg Smallman guitar.

== Discography ==
Year	Album	Credits	Peak positions							Certification
Year	Album	Credits	BEL (Fl)	BEL (Wa)	DEN	FR	NED	SWI	UK	Certification
2011	Mediterráneo	Miloš / Deutsche Grammophon	–	–	–	29	99	45	49	
2012	Latino	Miloš / Deutsche Grammophon	198	155	–	89	–	57	64	
2013	Aranjuez	Miloš Karadaglić / London Philharmonic Orchestra / Yannick Nézet-Séguin Decca	36	102	15	55	–	41	53	
2016	Blackbird: The Beatles Album	Miloš / Decca / Mercury Classics	106	200	–	78	–	–	47	

Others

- Latino Gold (2013)
- Miloš (2013)
- Canción (2013)
- Sound Of Silence (2019)
- The Moon & The Forest (2021)
- Baroque (2023)
