= Tomo Medin =

Montenegrin Serb adventurer and author (1725–1788)

- Born: 1725; Petrovac, Republic of Venice (modern-day Montenegro)
- Died: 1788 (aged 62–63); London, England
- Occupations: Adventurer, author, translator
- Writing career
- Notable works: Italian translation of Voltaire's Henriade (1774); translation of Claudian's The Abduction of Proserpina

Tomo Medin, also known as count Tommaso Medini (1725–1788) was a Montenegrin Serb adventurer and author, translator of Voltaire's Henriade into Italian. He achieved prominence in high society by rubbing shoulders with Stefano Zannowich, Count of St. Germain, Chevalier d'Eon, Alessandro Cagliostro, André-Robert Andréa de Nerciat and Giacomo Casanova with whom he had two duels.

== Biography ==
He was born in 1725 in Petrovac, near the coastal town of Budva at the time under the jurisdiction of the Republic of Venice, today in Montenegro. Unlike his Montenegrin predecessors, Tomo Medin preferred to study the laws and letters instead of joining a foreign military, a common practice among the young at the time. After a decade of unregulated life (1746-1756), he found shelter in the court of Maria Teresa in Vienna, where he remained until 1765, when the empress elected him captain of justice in Mantua, where he remained until 1768. But the passion of gambling beckoned him again, and perhaps because of his bad habit of gambling and making debts, he had to leave his post, abandoning himself to a stray, frantic and shameful life in Germany and Italy. Giacomo Casanova writes that Tomo Medin (who Casanova calls Count Tommaso Medini) died in London in 1788 in prison, incarcerated for failing to pay his debts. Biographers view it as slander because in the criminal archives of London there is absolutely no trace of him. Casanova himself admits in his memoirs that Count Medini and Zannovich were career gamblers like himself. Furthermore, the "Medini" Casanova mentions in his memoirs was, in fact, an extremely talented man of letters. In fact, Frances Burney, who was in Vienna in September 1772, that is, while Medin was in Germany, after having spoken of him with Metastasio, wrote: "Metastasio seems very passionate about the writings of Count Medini; whose poetic compositions are, as far as he claims, superior to those of any other living writer ".

He translated Voltaire's Henriade in 1774 and The Abduction of Proserpina by Claudian to Italian, which were published after the death of the author.

Also, Medin wrote: "Per il felicissimo giorno di nome di sua Altezza Serenissima l'Elittrice di Baviera Principessa reale di Polonia" (Monaco, 1773).

Medin died in London in 1788.

== See also ==
- Stefano Zannowich
