= Andrej Nikolaidis =

Montenegrin-Bosnian writer (born 1974)

- Андреј Николаидис
- Born: May 7, 1974 (age 52); Sarajevo, SFR Yugoslavia
- Other name: Ανδρέας Νικολαΐδης
- Citizenship: Montenegro, Bosnia and Herzegovina
- Occupations: Writer, Political Adviser
- Notable work: Sin (The Son)
- Spouse: Sanja Martinović
- Awards: European Union Prize for Literature (Winner Montenegro 2011), Thirteenth of July Award

Andrej Nikolaidis (Montenegrin Cyrillic: Андреј Николаидис; Greek: Ανδρέας Νικολαΐδης; born May 7, 1974) is a Montenegrin-Bosnian novelist, columnist, and political adviser. His novel Sin (The Son) won the European Union Prize for Literature in 2011. The English translation was published in 2013 by Istros Books in the United Kingdom.

From October 2009 to February 2014 he was adviser to Ranko Krivokapić, speaker of the Montenegrin Parliament. He is courrently columnist of Montenegrin internet portal CDM.

== Biography ==
Nikolaidis was born and raised in Sarajevo, SR Bosnia and Herzegovina, SFR Yugoslavia into a mixed Montenegrin/Greek family. In 1992, following the breakout of the Bosnian War, Nikolaidis's family moved to the Montenegrin town of Ulcinj, his father's hometown, where he owns a summer house. An ardent supporter of Montenegrin independence, anti-war activist and promoter of human rights, especially minority rights, Nikolaidis initially became known for his political views and public feuds, appearing on local television and in newspapers with his razor-sharp political commentaries. His writings for Monitor and Slobodna Bosna aroused controversy and he "received threats, including death threats, after publishing several articles about “facing the past.” During a talk show on Radio Antena M, one of the listeners, while on air, said that he would kill Nikolaidis."

Nikolaidis has published four novels in Montenegro and Croatia: Mimesis (Durieux, OKF, 2003), Son (Durieux, 2006), The Coming (Algoritam, 2009) and Till Kingdom Come (Algoritam, 2012) as well as collections of short stories The Cathedral in Seattle, Why Mira Furlan?, A Short History of Madness and a cultural theory book "Homo Sucker: The Poetics of Apocalypse". In 2012, two of his novels ('The Coming' and 'The Son') were published in English by the UK publisher Istros Books. In 2014, a German edition of "The Coming", "Die Ankunft", was published by Voland & Quist. His first critically acclaimed novel "Mimesis" was very well received in Croatia, Bosnia and among liberal Montenegrin intellectuals, where local independent media compares his expression and attitude to the one of Thomas Bernhard. He wrote columns for pro-independence Montenegrin publications such as Vijesti daily newspaper, Monitor weekly newsmagazine (from 2002 until 2009), and Crnogorski književni list weekly newspaper, as well as Bosnian weekly newsmagazine Slobodna Bosna. He now resides in Ulcinj, Montenegro.

On October 15, 2009, it was announced that Nikolaidis accepted a job as the adviser to politician Ranko Krivokapić, who was the speaker of the house in Montenegrin Parliament since 2003 and the honorary president of SDP CG party, a minor liberal party without parliamentary representatives. The announcement came couple of weeks after Krivokapić publicly supported Nikolaidis while criticizing the Montenegrin Supreme Court's final ruling in Kusturica vs. Nikolaidis case. Nikolaidis resigned in February 2014.

== Controversy ==
=== Emir Kusturica ===
On May 28, 2004, Nikolaidis's highly charged piece titled "Dželatov šegrt" (Executioner's Apprentice) was published as part of his regular column in Monitor weekly magazine. In it, he targeted film director Emir Kusturica, denouncing him, among other things, as one of the "biggest media stars of the time when Milošević's war propaganda propped people who had something stupid but patriotic to say and created news for people who were insensitive to human suffering, blind to their own guilt, and finally stupid enough to believe in their own righteousness".

Nikolaidis was subsequently sued by Kusturica for libel. After the trial in November 2004, primary court (Osnovni sud) in Podgorica under presiding judge Evica Durutović awarded Kusturica €5,000 in damages. However, on appeal, the verdict against Nikolaidis had been overruled by the higher court (Viši sud) in December 2005 and the case was returned to the lower court for a re-trial.

In late November 2007 the primary court (Osnovni sud) confirmed the previous verdict following a re-trial. Nikoladis again appealed the primary court verdict and the case was heard for the second time by the higher court (Viši sud) in April 2008 and this time it upheld the primary court verdict, ordering Nikolaids to pay the damages. In reaction to the verdict, Nikolaidis received individual support from Bosnia and Herzegovina where actor Emir Hadžihafizbegović and journalist Šemsudin "Šeki" Radončić raised funds to pay the Nikolaidis's fine.

=== Republika Srpska ===
In a January 11, 2012 article titled "What is Left of Greater Serbia," Nikolaidis wrote: "What would be, in B&H, in this case, true civilized step? Obviously, to global, uber-state, and uber-national institutions put justice ahead of pragmatism and ethics of profit, and conduct abolition, if needed by force, of Republika Srpska. [...] Civilised step would be if Bole used dynamite and rifles which he hid in the ballroom in which leaders, spiritual people, and artists celebrated 20th anniversary of existence of Republika Srpska."

== Awards and honors ==
- 2011: European Union Prize for Literature, winner Montenegro, Sin (The Son)
- 2022: Thirteenth of July Award, Montenegro.

== Published works ==
- Mimesis (2003)
- Sin (2006). The Son, trans. Will Firth (Istros Books, 2013)
- Balkanska Rapsodija (2007). Balkan Rhapsody
- Mimesis i drugi skandali (2008). Mimesis and Other Scandals
- Dolazak (2009). The Coming, trans. Will Firth (Istros Books, 2012)
- Homo Sucker : Poetika Apokalipse (2010)
- Odlaganje. Parezija (2012)
- Mala enciklopedija ludila (2013). The Small Encyclopedia of Madness
- Devet (2014). Till Kingdom Come, trans. Will Firth (Istros Books, 2015)
- Smjena straže (2015). The Changing of the Guard
- Mađarska rečenica (2017). The Hungarian Sentence
- Anomalija (2022). Anomaly, trans. Will Firth (Peirene Press, 2024)

=== Compilations in English ===
- The Olcinium Trilogy (Istros Books, 2019). Collects The Son, The Coming and Till Kingdom Come.
