= Mirko Breyer =

- Born: 23 October 1863; Varaždin, Austro-Hungarian monarchy, (now Croatia)
- Died: 29 December 1946 (aged 83); Zagreb, SFR Yugoslavia, (now Croatia)
- Relatives: Marko Breyer (father); Ema Breyer (mother)

Mirko Breyer (23 October 1863 – 29 December 1946) was a known Croatian writer, bibliographer and antiquarian.

== Early life and education ==
Breyer was born in Varaždin, Croatia on 23 October 1863. He was raised in a Jewish family. His father, Marko Breyer was banker and manager of the "Križevačka dionička štedionica" (Križevci equity savings), longtime representative of the Križevci City Assembly and municipal prefect deputy. Breyer spent his early childhood in Varaždin. He finished elementary school in Križevci and attended high school in Varaždin, Zagreb and Trieste.

== Career ==
After high school, Breyer worked in Trieste as an apprentice in a renowned trading company, Binenfeld. The company sent him to Aden, Yemen, which at the time was the important trading center of the East India Company in Arabia. There he started to learn foreign languages, including Arabic.

Upon his return from Aden, Breyer pursued higher education in Trieste, Vienna, Leipzig, Munich and Hamburg. He studied commerce. In 1890, he returned to Križevci. From 1890 to 1893 he wrote poems for "Narodni list" Zadar (Peoples daily).

Breyer moved to Zagreb in 1903. He spent his free time reading and collecting antiquities. In 1903, Breyer founded the educational publishing and antique bookstore "Slavenski znanstveni antikvarijat" (Slavic research antique store) in Zagreb. He sold the educational publishing bookstore in 1920, which was then renamed to "Jugoslavenska znastvena knjižara d.d." (Yugoslav research bookstore). Breyer kept his antique bookstore until 1928, when it is liquidated. From 1929 to 1940 he was the general manager of a publishing company "Obnova" (Renewal). Under Breyer's leadership "Obnova" published works of a prominent Croatian writers such as Vladimir Nazor and Antun Gustav Matoš.

== Assimilation, persecution and World War II ==
Breyer was a supporter of a Jewish assimilation in Croatia, and a longtime member of the Israelites Zagreb community (now Jewish community Zagreb). In 1922 he founded the society "Narodni rad - društvo židovskih asimilanata i anticionista u Hrvatskoj" (Peoples work - Society of Jewish assimilates and anti Zionists in Croatia). Breyer's aim was to gather all Croatian and Yugoslav Jews regardless of political view. On numerous occasions he called for Croatian Zionists to join him, and objected them on their lack of Croatian and Yugoslav patriotism. In 1924, on a second anniversary of a society, Breyer again called all the Croatian and Yugoslav Jews to join them in their society. Some of society notable members were; Samuel David Alexander, Šandor Alexander and Vladimir Šterk. During World War II Breyer was imprisoned, as a Jew, at Stara Gradiška concentration camp for six months. Later he was imprisoned two more times. During his incarceration he wrote a poem "U sabirnom logoru" (In the internment camp). Independent State of Croatia officials excluded Breyer from wearing the star of David Yellow badge. He managed to survive the Holocaust and after the war he worked as a bibliographer at the "Hrvatski nakladni zavod" (Croatian publishing bureau). Despite this well-known fact, during the time of communist Yugoslavia he was falsely put on the list of the Stara Gradiška concentration camp victims killed by Ustaše as a part of communist anti-Croatian propaganda. This false information was also accepted by the United States Holocaust Memorial Museum during a massive unchecked import of data.

== Antiquities and donations ==
From an early age Breyer collected antiquities. While in Aden he directed several shipments of ethnographic antiquities to Zagreb museums. Breyer donated to Croatian Academy of Sciences and Arts around 80 autographs of notable Croats from 18th and 19th century. He also donated Museum of Arts and Crafts, Zagreb and Croatian National Theatre in Zagreb. After Breyer's death, his heirs donated to National and University Library in Zagreb 353 books and a large number of vintage magazines.

== Death ==
Breyer died in Zagreb on 29 December 1946. He was buried at the Mirogoj Cemetery.

== Bibliography ==
- Goldstein, Ivo (2005). Židovi u Zagrebu 1918 - 1941. Zagreb: Novi Liber. ISBN 953-6045-23-0.
- Goldstein, Ivo (2001). Holokaust u Zagrebu. Zagreb: Novi Liber-Židovska općina Zagreb. ISBN 953-6045-19-2.
- Kraus, Ognjen (1998). Dva stoljeća povijesti i kulture Židova u Zagrebu i Hrvatskoj. Zagreb: Židovska općina Zagreb. ISBN 953-96836-2-9.
