= Andrija Radulović (poet) =

Montenegrin poet (born 1970)

- Aндрија Радуловић
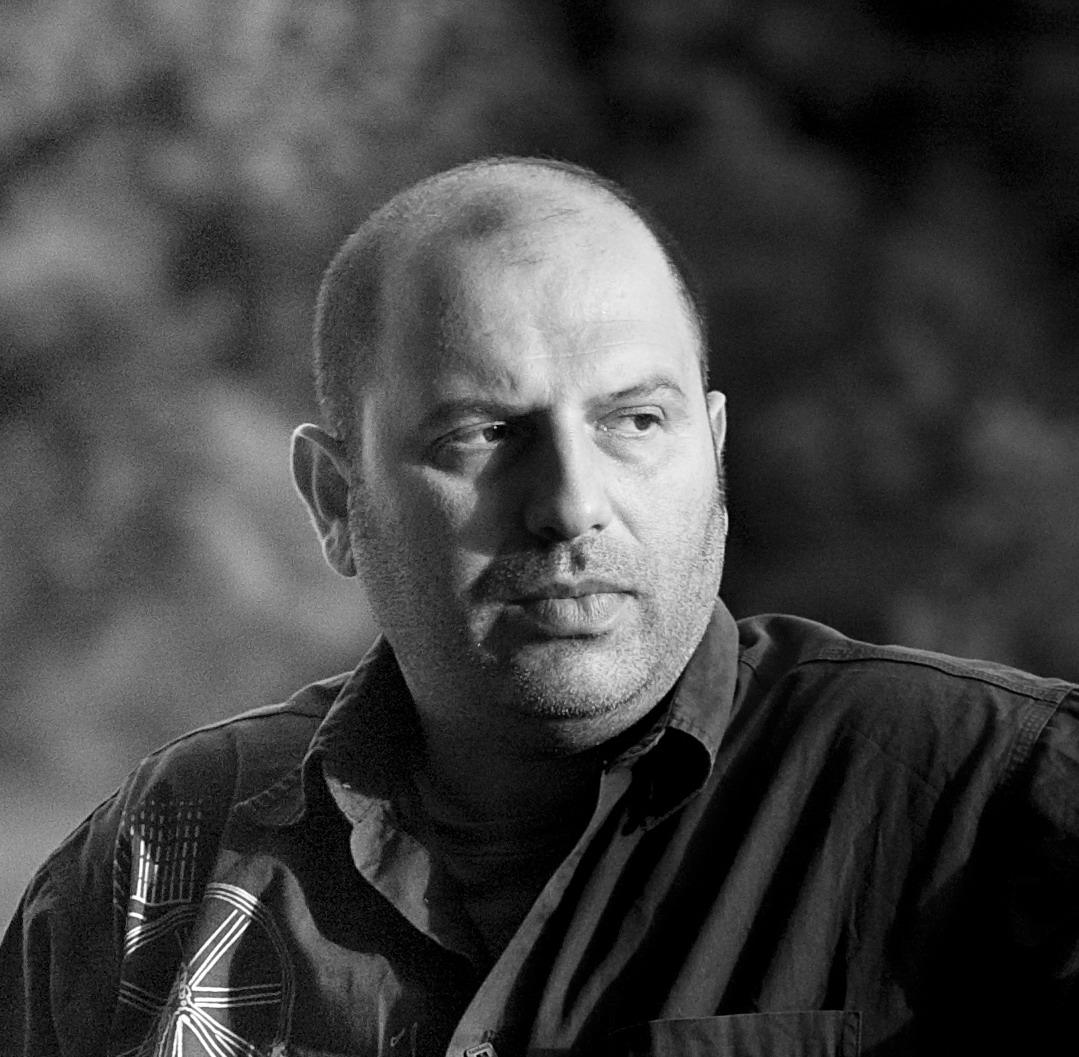
- Born: February 3, 1970 (age 56); Titograd, Socialist Republic of Montenegro, SFR Yugoslavia
- Education: University of Montenegro, University of Novi Sad
- Occupation: Poet

Andrija Radulović (Montenegrin Cyrillic: Aндрија Радуловић; born 3 February 1970) is a prominent Montenegrin poet. He studied history at the Faculty of Philosophy at University of Montenegro and graduated as professor of education from Faculty of education, University of Novi Sad. He writes poetry, literary criticism, essays and translates from the Russian language. His poetry is presented in several national and international anthologies, while his literary work has been translated into twenty four languages. He lives in Podgorica. Radulović was one of the editors of two literary magazines of the Association of Writers of Montenegro, "Square" and "Literary Record".

Radulović received a number of national and international awards for his prose and poetry, most notable being:

- I nagrada Vidovdanskog sajma knjiga, Podgorica, Montenegro, 2003, (for poetry)
- Gramota, Sofia, Bulgaria, 2003, (for poetry)
- Nosside,(UNESCO, World Poetry Directory), Reggio Calabria, Italy, 2005
- Aninoasa, Trgoviste, Romania 2006, (for poetry and cultural achievements)
- Božidar Vuković Podgoričanin, Podgorica, Montenegro 2008
- Kočićevo pero, Banja Luka, Bosnia and Hercegovina, 2008
- Zlatna značka KPZ Srbije, Belgrade, Serbia 2008, (for literature and editorial work)
- Vukova povelja, Loznica, Serbia, 2008, (for distinguished achievements in national culture)
- Marko Miljanov, Podgorica, Montenegro, 2009, (for poetry, Montenegrin Writers Association)
- Золотое перо Руси, Moscow, Russia, 2009, (Laureate for poetry and for its translated poems in Russian)
- Naji Naaman, Lebanon, 2010, (Creativity Prize)
- Tverska Gramota, Tver, Russia, 2011
- Boris Kornilov, Sankt Peterburg, Russia, 2012
- Balkanika, Braila, Romania, 2012
- Simo Matavulj, Belgrade, Serbia, 2014
- Pečat varoši sremskokarlovačke, Sremski Karlovci, Serbia, 2021
- Radoje Domanović, Serbia, 2022
- Trinaestojulska nagrada, Montenegro, 2024

== Published works ==
- Pogled s mosta (A view of the bridge), Podgorica, 1994
- Znak u pijesku (A sign in the sand), Herceg Novi, 1995
- Ponoć na Donu (Midnight at Don), Podgorica, 1997
- Ognjeno rebro (Fire Bone), Andrijevica, 1998
- Riječ sa juga – Слово с Юга (A word from the South), in Serbian and Russian, Podgorica, 2000
- Anđeo u pšenici (Angel in the wheat), Podgorica, 2002
- Oгнено ребро (Fire Bone), in Bulgarian, Sofia, 2003
- Coasta de foc (Fire Bone), in Romanian, Targoviste, 2006
- Sniježna azbuka (Snow alphabet), Podgorica, 2007
- Zvono (Bell), Podgorica, 2008
- Bivše kraljevstvo (The Former Kingdom), Podgorica, 2010
- Снежня азбука, ( Snow alphabet ), in Russian, Tver, 2011
- Snežna azbuka ( Snow alphabet ), in Slovenian, Ljubljana, 2013
- Bijela pčela Volta Vitmena ( White Bee of Walt Whitman), Podgorica-Beograd, 2015
- Kad bih plakao kao vinograd ( If I Could Cry as a Vineyard), Podgorica-Beograd, 2018
- General i lasta (General and Swallow), Podgorica, 2021
