= Gojko Čelebić =

Montenegrin writer

- Born: 1958 (age 67–68); Titograd, Socialist Federal Republic of Yugoslavia
- Education: University of Novi Sad Faculty of Law
- Writing career
- Notable awards: Thirteenth of July Award

Gojko Čelebić (Cyrillic: Гојко Челебић) (born 1958) is a Montenegrin writer and diplomat.

Čelebić was born in Podgorica, Montenegro (at that time part of the Federal Republic of Yugoslavia). He finished high school in Cetinje, Montenegro. Čelebić went on to study at the University of Novi Sad Faculty of Law, Serbia and Podgorica, Montenegro. He then graduated from DAMU (Prague, in that time Czechoslovakia) in 1989 with a degree in dramaturgy. During the dissident movement in East Europe, through which Čelebić build himself as a creator of similar works, beginning in the 1980s he directed numerous theatrical pieces of dissident writers and began to publish dramas, poetry, short stories and novels. He also spent some time as a Prague student in Schauspielhaus, Berlin in 1987 as he participated in a seminar on Bertolt Brecht. In 1989 he received a master's degree in Prague through his thesis on Vsevolod Meyerhold.

Čelebić's political career began with a position as the minister of culture in Montenegro, in the government of Prime Minister Milo Đukanović, a mandate that lasted from 1993 to 1996. Following which he served as the ambassador of Federal Republic of Yugoslavia to Argentina for the period between 1998 and 2002, (submitted credentials to President Carlos Saúl Menem on the August 12, 1998). During the same period, Čelebić also served as a non-residing ambassador to Uruguay, (submitted credentials to President Julio Maria Sanguinetti on the November 11, 1998). In addition, he served as a non-residing ambassador to Paraguay during the same time, (submitted credentials to the President Raúl Cubas Grau on February 9, 1999). Following these mandates, he was appointed minister-counselor at the Embassy of Serbia and Montenegro in Japan from 2005 until Montenegro's Independence in 2006. Currently Čelebić serves as a Deputy Permanent Representative of Montenegro to the United Nations in New York.

By a literary vocation, Čelebić is a novelist, channeling the traditional European philosophical novel. Nevertheless, his literary historical interests are linked to European baroque, and aspects related to south Slavic languages and culture, especially things dealing with medieval and baroque Kotor. The most significant influence on his literary development, which became evident in his work, was the American (and later European) Hippie movement. In addition, the dissident literature such as that of Milovan Djilas and Vladimir Nabokov as well as numerous writers of his own generation in Poland, Germany, and Russia have been very significant in the process of his artistic creation.

In the beginning of the 1990s, Čelebić founded and directed two anthological projects. The first was a collection of novel published in twenty volumes, which presents the anthology of Montenegrin novels in the 20th century. The second, of which he is also the creator, is a complete anthology of the Montenegrin literature that has been in development for the last thousand years. These works were created in four languages: Latin, Italian, Serbian and Church Slavonic. It has also been published by his conduct in twenty-three volumes in a collection entitled Literature of Montenegro 12th to 19th century. Čelebić is a polyglot (fluent in English, French, Czech, Russian, and Spanish).

== Selected works ==
Čelebić's works, that is special publishings of his books, translations, essays, dramas, criticism, political pieces, translations of his work in numerous languages, newspaper articles, reviews, etc. written between 1976 and 2004 total 416 titles.

Year	Title	Type
1983	A Heroic Novel about Women's Tears (Viteski roman o ženskim suzama)	Novel
1988	The Murder of A.G. W and Persecution (Ubistvo A. G. W. i gonjenje)	Novel
1989	Mature Herta (Zrela Herta)	Novel
1994	Pseudo	Novel
1995	City Club	Novel
1997	Spiders (Pauci)	Novel
2003	Lightening (Grom)	Novel
2004	Twins (Blizanci)	Novel
2004	Twins (Blizanci)	Novel
2006	Buried, Listen (Pokopani, čujte)	Novel
1992	A Farewell from the King (Oproštaj od kralja)	Short Story
2001	The Atlantic Waves (Valovi Atlantika)	Short Story
2003	Candidacy (Kandidatura)	Short Story
2004	Dust in Love (Zaljubljeni prah)	Short Story
2007	Bohemian Season (Boemska sezona)	Short Story
1982	Lira in Purgatory (Lira u čistilištu)	Poetry
1995	Baroque (Barok)	Drama
2004	Selected works of Gojko Čelebić 1–10 (Odabrana djela Gojka Čelebića I – X)	Anthology

== General references ==
- Pseudo Theatrical Novel-4th edition—Novi Sad: Prometej; Belgrade: Prosveta, 1997. Pg. 324 (Novels/Gojko Čelebić). Notes on the writer pg. 321. In Ah, Marija (Sofija)—Year 9, number 2. (1996) pg. 299–308. Translated by: Aleksandra Liven.
- Baroque – Theatrical piece—Sremski Karlovci: Krovovi: Culture Center “Karlovci’s art workshop” 1995. (Apatin—Novi Sad: King of Whiteness) –pg. 164. (Library of modern literature) Notes on the writer pg. 162.
- IL FUCILE In: Orme sull’ Adriatico: Poesia del-la Puglia e del Montenegro/ Scelta degli autori montenegrini: Steve Kordić; traduzioni in italiano e dall/ italiano: Dragan Mraović—Nikšic: Univerzitetska riječ; Bari: La valissa, 1990, pg. 62. Songs.
- The Welcoming in the name of the City In: Anthology of modern Montenegrin stories/ prepared by: Slobodan Kalezić and Vojislav D. Nikčević—Cetinje: Obod; Podgorica: Pobjeda, 1996, pg. 431–444.
- Reservist In: Sovremenaya (Moscow) Number 2 (1996), pg. 131–153. Drama—Translated by: Natalija Vagapova.
- BORHES & Zmajević In: Jorge Luis Borges: Works of international literature and science meeting dedicated to H.L. Borges held on the 24 and 25 September in 1996, in Belgrade and other texts. Prepared by: Radivoje Konstantinović, Filip Matić, Marko Nedić—Belgrade: Institute for textbooks and other teaching material: Serbian cooperative for literature: Partnership of Yugoslavia and Latin America, 1997 pg. 161–166.
- Intolerance In: New Macedonia –(1997). Selections from the novel “Pseudo”.
- Literature Montenegro: (krimipovidka) In: Souvislosti (revue pro kŕestanství a kulturu). –Number 3-4 (1997), pg. 277–289. Translated by: Lenka Blechova
- City Club: Literárni text. In: Literarni noviny (Czech) Edition 11, Number 40 (2000), Pg.10. Translated by: Lenka Blechova.
- The Atlantic Waves In: Montenegrin Erotic Stories. Editor: Jovan Nikolaidis—Ulcinj:Plima, 2000, pg. 33–51. Story.
- Symbols in Poetry of Joseph Brodsky In: Pobjeda—Edition 26, Number 5329 (4.X 1980), pg. 12. Notes on the element of darkness in literary songs “Station in the desert”
- I’m an intellectual, but that is a matter of reading. In: Pobjeda, Edition 42, Number 7208 (29.XII 1985), pg.11. The talk with the Czech author Bohumil Hrabal was led by Gojko Čelebić.
- Nabokov In: Ovdje (Here)—Edition 21, Number 244-245(1989), pg.40 In his own creativity
- Word of the word In: Pobjeda: Edition 47, number 9935 (31. VII 1993), pg. 7. On the fifth century anniversary of Montenegrin press
- Karel Čapek In: Kompozitor Foltin/Karel Čapek—Belgrade; Rad, 1990, pg.111–115. About the makings of K. Čapek
- Short history of Montenegro In: Royal Theatre “Zeta Hall”, Cetinje, 1996 pg.2–10.
- Draperies In: Stvaranje— Edition 52. Number 11-12 (1997), pg.1185–1186. About the artist Savo Braunović
- Milovan Djilas: Un destino disidente. In: Revista diplomatica Placet—Number 117 (2001).
- Review of the American Drama In: Pobjeda, Edition 45, Number 8443 (3. VI 1989), pg.13. About the music festival “Prague Spring” and the current cultural happening is Prague.
- MEYERCHOLOMASCHINE The culture of totalitarianism In: Stvaranje, Edition 44 Number 1 (1990) pg. 97–125. “Hrestomatija uz Mejerholjdova ‘Revizora’”
- EGZEKUTORI In: Grand Theater Budva 1987—1996 First 10 years. Prepared by: Jovan Cirilov, Feliks Pašić--Budva, Grand Theater 1998, pg.72. Performance based on the work of Harold Pinter. Directed by Gojko Celebic in the Montenegrin National Theater. (1993)
- PARK In: The Gran Theater Budva 1987–1996, first 10 years. Prepared by Čirilov, Feliks Pašić—Budva, Grand Theater, 1998, pg.56. Performance based on Skeaksear’s “Dream of a summer night” directed by Gojko Čelebić, and ran by the Herzegovian National Theater. (1990)
- SEIFERT, Jaroslav Songs/ Jaroslav Seifert In: Ovdje—Edition 17, Number 189 (1985) pg. 11. Contains the following songs: The tomb of mister Casanova, The ring of king Otakar I, Compound source, Cashmere scarf. Translated by: Gojko Čelebić.
- ECO, Umberto Simiotica insenacije/ Umberto Eco In: Stvaranje—Edition 44, Number 1 (1989), pg.74–82. Translated from French by: Gojko Čelebić.
- Bolica, Ivan Bona, Description of Ivan Bona Bolica. In: Pobjeda—Edition 52, Number 11083 (19.X1996), pg.15. In the seventh volume edition of “Literature of Montenegro XII-XIX century” first time in the adoption of Gojko Čelebić, you will find the poem of a Kotor poet from the 16th century.
- Creando en una de las esquinas del mundo. In: Lecturas de los Domingos—Edition 3, Number 162 (30. IV 2000), pg.8–9. Con Gojko Čelebić, escritor y embajador Yugoslavo (interview).
- Pavkovic, Vasa. Evil and tittup of stories/Vasa Pavković. In: Politika—Edition 60, Number 28686 (21. VIII 1993), pg.16. About Gojko Čelebić's novel, “A farewell from the king”.
- Ćirilov, Jovan. When the minister writes.../Jovan Ćirilov In: Politika—Edition 61, Number 28996 (9. VII 1994), pg.14. With regard to the works of Gojko Čelebić.
- Jerkov, Aleksandar. Minister—Novel/ Aleksandar Jerkov. In: Borba—Edition 72, Number 220 (11. VIII 1994) addition to World book, pg.3. About the novel “Pseudo”.
- Pavković, Vasa Fishes Plamičak Čirak/ Vasa Pavković. In: Pobjeda—Edition 51, Number 10393 (12. XI 1994), pg.11. Novel in Montenegro: Gojko Čelebić.
- Brajović, Tihomir. Traveling at the end of an illusion/ Tihomir Brajović. In: NIN, Number 2347(22. XII 1995), pg. 43. About Gojko Čelebić's book “City Club”.
- Pavić, Milorad Notes accompanying Čelebić's theatrical novel/ Milorad Pavić. In: Pobjeda—Edition 52, Number 10998 (25. VI 1996), pg. 10. Also in: Stvaranje—Edition 51, Number 8-12 (1996), pg. 899–900.
- Vagapova, Natalija V plenu svoey sudby/ Natalija Vagapova. In:Pobjeda—Edition 52, Number.11105 (9. XI 1996), pg.130. Regarding the dramas of Gojko Čelebić.
- Popović, Branko. Gojko Čelebić: “City Club”, Belgrade, 1995/ Branko Popović. In: Leyopis Matice Srpske. Edition 173, book 459, Number 1-2 (1997), pg. 180–186.
- REĐEP, Draško, A never ending sail/ Drasko Ređep. In: Luča (Nikšic)—Edition 6, Number 6-7 (1997), pg. 11–13. About the novel “Morder of A.G.W. and persecution”.
- Stojkovska, Gordana Pseudo-Marker na granicnoto iskustvo/ Gordana Stojkovska. In: New Macedonija—(1997). Kon deloto na Gojko Čelebić.
- Asumieron los embajadores de Italia, Yugoslavia y Rumania. In: La Revista Diplomatica—Edition 20, Number 87 (1998), pg.7. Yugoslavia-Gojko Čelebić.
