= Mojdež =

Village in Herceg Novi, Montenegro

Mojdež Мојдеж
- Village
- Location within Montenegro
- Coordinates: 42.485145°N 18.490666°E
- Country: Montenegro
- Region: Coastal
- Municipality: Herceg Novi

Population (2011)
  - Total: 264
- Time zone: UTC+1 (CET)
  - Summer (DST): UTC+2 (CEST)

Mojdež (Montenegrin: Мојдеж) is a village in the municipality of Herceg Novi, Montenegro.

== Demographics ==
According to the 2011 census, its population was 264.

Ethnicity in 2011
Ethnicity	Number	Percentage
Serbs	141	53.4%
Montenegrins	49	18.6%
other/undeclared	74	28.0%
Total	264	100%
