= Aleksa Asanovic =

Montenegrin music educator (born 1945)

Aleksa Asanovic is a professor of cello and a solo cellist, teacher, conductor, director and founder of the first school of music for strings in Montenegro.

== Early life ==
Asanovic was born on 14 May 1945, in Podgorica (Montenegro). He graduated from the Music Academy in the class of Victor Jakovčić in Belgrade and then in the class of André Navarra in Skopje.

== Career as musician ==
He has worked as a leader of symphonic orchestras, and was the director of "Music Production RTCG" and "Symphony Orchestra RTCG." He has performed with more than 40 renowned pianists and conductors in Europe and America. Records for the purpose of broadcasting centers. He has received over 100 "Golden Lira", "December awards liberation Podgorica", "Oktoih-a", "Legion of Honor" medal "Knight of literature and the arts" and others. Asanovic has been a guest soloist with the UCO Symphony Orchestra. In April 2013 he performed several pieces at the Podgorica Spring Time Chamber Music Festival, celebrating the 20th anniversary of the Andre Navarra Music School.
