= Miloš Vušković =

Montenegrin painter (1900–1975)

Miloš Vušković (Serbian Cyrillic: Милош Вушковић; 1900–1975) was a Montenegrin painter, illustrator, caricaturist and professor of visual arts, member of CANU (Montenegrin Academy of Sciences and Arts) and ULUCG (Association of the Visual Artists of Montenegro).

== Biography ==
Vušković studied visual arts in Belgrade (1920–1922) and Vienna, where he graduated in 1924. In 1935 he became the co-founder of the satirical journal Ošišani Jež and worked on it together with Beta Vukanović, Pjer Križanić, Branislav Nušić, Stanislav Vinaver, Branko Ćopić and other famous artists and writers from the period.

Vušković was a member of Serbian artistic group Oblik and the author of political caricatures and humor cartoons about lala Moce and Montenegrin Krcun, the most popular fictional characters ever published by the journal Jež.

After Second World War Vušković had to relocate to Montenegro and 1948 became director of the School of Arts in Herceg Novi. In 1950 he became director of the Heritage museum Pljevlja and in 1952 also of the National Art Gallery in Cetinje.

The artist had several solo exhibitions and participated in all most important domestic and international manifestations organized by the associations of visual artists of Montenegro, Serbia and ex Yugoslavia. In 1944 he participated in a group exhibition in Belgrade with Jovan Bjelić, Stojan Aralica, Beta Vukanović and Nedeljko Gvozdenović. Vušković's works were also exhibited alongside the paintings of Petar Lubarda, Milo Milunović, Risto Stijovic and other famous Montenegrin artists. His portraits, landscapes, compositions and other works make part of the collection of the National Museum of Montenegro.
