= Ilija Kolarić =

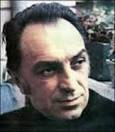
- Ilija Kolarić, around 1979.
- Born: January 27, 1926; Novi Sad, Kingdom of Serbs, Croats and Slovenes
- Died: December 3, 2004; Novi Sad, Serbia, Serbia and Montenegro
- Known for: Landscape, Still life, Interior
- Movement: Neorealism

Ilija Kolarić was a Serbian painter.

== Biography ==
Ilija Kolarić was born in Novi Sad on January 27, 1926. He began his career as a painter at a military technical institute and then worked in the studios of Petar Lubarda, Milo Milunović, Đorđe Ilijić, and Anton Huiter. Later, he worked as a freelance artist. In his youth, he was trained to be a pilot. He held several exhibitions throughout the former Yugoslavia, as well as in other countries such as Moscow, Paris, Brussels, Warsaw, Munich, Philadelphia, and others. He spent over 50 years of his life married to his wife Ljubica, who outlived him. He left behind a personal legacy in the town of Mošorin. His works are included in many museums and private collections. He mainly painted landscapes, still lifes, and interiors, and his style is characterized by a realistic approach to the subject, with a particular attention to light and color. He died on December 3, 2004, in Novi Sad.^{NB}

== Style and genre inclinations ==
Ilija Kolarić's paintings are dominated by pastoral motifs and attempts to convey the role of the atmosphere in different ways. His main inspiration was the Vojvodina landscape, which he returned to throughout his life. From an early age, and particularly during his youth, he was interested in oriental themes (Baghdad's Lullaby), and especially in oriental rugs. During his pilot career, Kolarić begins to deal with the theme of aviation, which will later often take an important place in his work (Icarus).

In Kolarić's works, the technique of sfumato is the dominating one, in which critics often compared him to Flemish masters.

== Contribution ==
=== Notable paintings and cycles ===
- "Baghdad's Lullaby"
- "Icarus"
- "Silence"
- Cycle "Man and Space"
- Cycle "Amazon Women"

=== Documentary films about Kolarić ===
- "All Kolarić's Loves" (1992)
- "Dancing in the Frame" (2001).

== See also ==
- Petar Lubarda
- Milo Milunović

== Notes ==
^^{NB} Various sources on the internet incorrectly state that Kolarić passed away in 2003.
