= Danica Đurović =

Montenegrin painter (1925–2001)

Danica Đurović (1925 – 2001), sometimes Danja, was a Montenegrin painter.

Born in Cetinje, Đurović was first educated at the Academy of Applied Arts at the University of Zagreb, the art school of Herceg Novi, and the Pedagogical Academy in Nikšić; her first career was as a teacher. She took painting lessons in the studio of the Ministry of Culture in Cetinje, and later worked with Milo Milunović in his studio. Milunović influenced her early choice of subjects, such as still lifes, but she soon moved in a more expressionistic direction stylistically. This phase concluded with a further turn towards abstraction, in which recognizable forms are simplified and rearranged. She returned to early themes in her later painting. Đurović is represented in the collection of the Art Museum of Montenegro. She died in Podgorica in 2001.
