= National Library of Montenegro =

Coordinates: 42.39438°N 18.91536°E

National Library of Montenegro "Đurđe Crnojević"
- Nacionalna biblioteka Crne Gore "Đurđe Crnojević"
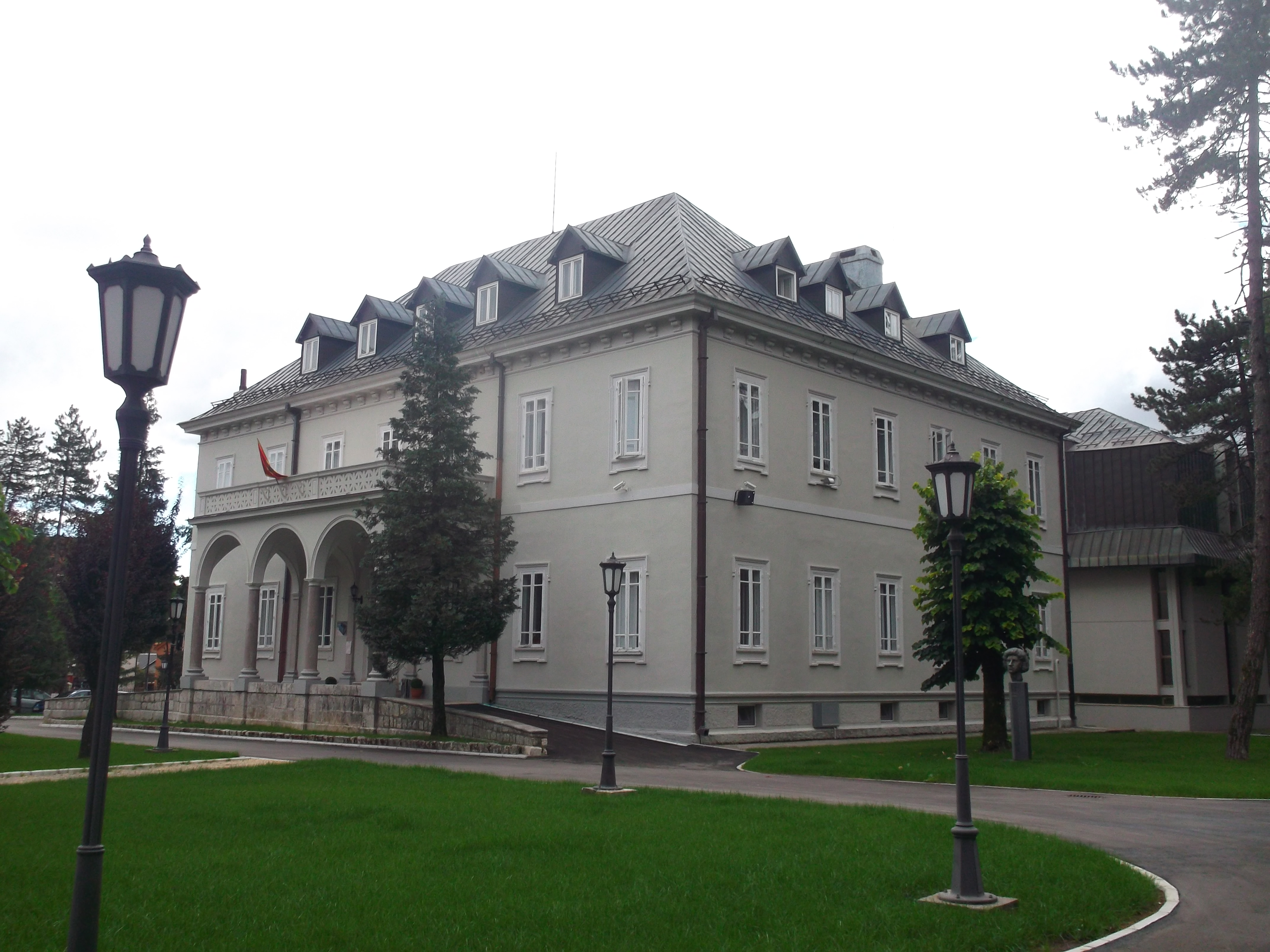
- Location: Cetinje, Montenegro
- Established: 1893 (133 years ago)

Collection
- Items collected: books, newspapers, magazines, manuscripts, geographical and historiographical maps, atlases, printed music, postcards and photographs, albums, catalogs, audio and video materials, micrographic forms
- Size: 2,000,000

Other information
- Director: Dragica Lompar
- Website: nb-cg.me

The National Library of Montenegro "Đurđe Crnojević" (NLM) is a public institution that preserves the written, printed and publications in other media published in Montenegro and abroad. As part of its own publishing production, NLM publishes retrospective and current Montenegrin national bibliography. NLM is the parent library to all libraries in Montenegro and the National Agency for the assignment of ISBN, ISSN, ISMN and other international bibliographic numbers, and for Cataloguing in Publication (CIP) for publishers in Montenegro. NLM "Đurđe Crnojević" was named after the 15th century ruler of Montenegro, who in 1493 established the first state printing house in the world and the second Cyrillic printing house in Europe. Since 2004, Jelena Djurovic has been the Director of the National Library.

== History ==
- 1592-1593 – 42 books listed in the Cetinje Monastery during the reign of the dynasty Crnojević. These are the earliest preserved book inventories in Montenegro.
- 1838 – Montenegrin ruler, bishop and poet, Petar II Petrović-Njegoš, separated religious from secular books among the books that he and his predecessor, Petar I, procured for the Cetinje Monastery, and transferred them to his residence – the Billiard House. His library served as the state library.
- 1893 – On the occasion of 400th anniversary of the Crnojević printing house, Prince Nikola I Petrović-Njegoš founded the Public Library.
- 1896 – The Law of the Principality-Montenegrin Library was adopted and the Public Library was entrusted with the task of collecting "all works, in all languages, related to Montenegro," and books of the other Yugoslav and Slavonic people. The title of State Librarian was established. The library was housed in the premises of the Royal Theatre Zetski dom along with the Museum, where it remained until the end of World War II.
- 1905 – By the Law on Printing in the Principality of Montenegro, the Library was entitled to obtain the three obligatory copies "of each printed issue" in the territory of Montenegro, which significantly increased the library fund.
- 1918 – Almost the entire library fund of the Royal Library was destroyed in the war.
- 1927 – The National Museum Library in Cetinje took over the role of the Central Scientific Library of Montenegro which until the 1941 served as the depository library for Montenegro. It was mainly created from the remaining holdings of the former Royal Library. It collected books from the royal libraries in Bar, Podgorica and Nikšić and it was organized and run by Dušan Vuksan, Božo Đukić and Risto Dragičević.
- 1944 – After the liberation of Cetinje, the National Museum Library functioned as the Central Library in People's Republic of Montenegro serving as the depository library for Montenegro and one of depository libraries of Yugoslavia.
- 1946 – The Ministry of Education of the People's Republic of Montenegro established the National Central Library in Cetinje on March 26.
- 1951 – Library got the building of the former French Embassy in Cetinje.
- 1964 – Due to the significant increase of the library holdings, the former Italian Embassy building became the headquarters of the Library.
- 1964 – Library was renamed to Central National Library "Đurđe Crnojević".
- 1981 – The library was provided with a central depot for the accommodation of library holdings, on the area of 4500 m2, which is located within the complex of the former Italian Embassy.
- 2012 – Central National Library of Montenegro "Đurđe Crnojević" was renamed the National Library of Montenegro "Đurđe Crnojević".

== Buildings ==
NLM "Đurđe Crnojević" is located at two sites in Cetinje, in two significant historical mansions built in 1910 for the Italian and French diplomacies in the Kingdom of Montenegro (1910-1918). The former Italian Embassy was built according to the project designed by the Italian architect Corradini, while the former French embassy was designed by renowned French architect Paul Gaudet.

== Collections ==
The library collection of NLM "Đurđe Crnojević" consists of about 2,000,000 (two million) books, newspapers, magazines, manuscripts, geographical and historiographical maps, atlases, printed music, postcards and photographs, albums, catalogs, audio and video materials, micrographic forms and other library materials. Library material is arranged into three sections: Basic Holdings, Special Collection and Museum Holdings.

The general collection consists of books and serial publications (magazines and newspapers) from all scientific fields, in various languages. Special collections consists of manuscripts and documentary materials, a collection of old and rare books, a map collection, a collection of music and audiovisual holdings, and a graphic & artistic collection.

The museum holdings consist of the national collection "Montenegrina" or "Černogorika" (Montenegrin books and periodicals), and Legacies.

=== General collection ===
The general collection contains all publications acquired by legal deposit, purchase, gift and international exchange. This fund counts about 800.000 books, 13. 000 newspaper titles and 11.300 journal titles, European, international, and Montenegrin.

=== Special collections ===
Collection of manuscripts and documentary materials: The oldest manuscripts, mainly written by former rulers and prominent persons in Montenegro, date from the eighteenth and nineteenth centuries. This collection also holds some personal documents, reports, verdicts. Some of the most valuable manuscripts are: Pismo Ugnjanima written by Bishop Sava in 1774; Pismo Vladike Petra I Petrovića Njegoša Bjelici iz Majina from 1794; Crnogorcima na brodu Porto Roze 1817; and poems of Petar II Petrović Njegoš.

The Old and Rare Books Collection contains about 10,000 library items, including incunabula, postincunabula, old books (Cyrillic books printed before 1868, and Latin to 1800), rare editions and miniatures. Among the most valuable Cyrillic manuscript is Otočnik from the end of the fourteenth century. Among printed books, the oldest ones in the collection are Noctes Atticae, printed in typography of Andrija Paltašić-Kotoranin (Venice, 1477), and Epistolae sancti Hieronymi (Venice, 1496.; printer John Varcelens). Among periodicals from the late eighteenth and nineteenth centuries Orfelin's Slaveno serbskij magazine, the first Serbian journal from 1768, stands out for its rarity.

The Cartographic Collection consists of more than 500 geographical atlases and 2,500 geographic maps. The oldest and most valuable atlas in the Montenegrin National Library collection originates from 1764. It is the first Mediterranean atlas, Carte de la mer Mediterranée, by celebrated French hydrographer Joseph Raux. The collection also includes 42 800 postcards, of which the oldest ones (from the end of the nineteenth century) can be a very important material for studying the life of the former residents of Cetinje and Montenegro, who recorded their impressions of the great European and world cities, as well as the events from their private lives on these postcards.

The Music and Audiovisual Holdings contain about 27,000 library items, that is about 19,000 audio-visual materials and 8,000 printed music, among which Album Černogorski, 70 narodniuh pisni of Ludvik Kuba from 1890, and Motifs from Montenegro, the concert for Violin and piano by Antun Pogacar have a special value. Among other items, this collection has about 7,500 single records, 7,000 LP records, 4100 audio cassettes, more than 200 video cassettes and 1,000 CDs.

The Artistic and Graphic Collection contains about 74 000 posters of all kinds, of which 17 000 Montenegrin - political, film, concert, exhibition, theatrical, educational, tourism, commercial. Special for their rarity and artistic value are the posters made for the plays performed at the Royal Theatre "Zetski dom" in Cetinje, from the end of the nineteenth and the beginning of the twentieth century.

=== Museum holdings ===
The National Collection Montenegrina was formed and enriched on the basis of three criteria, on which the Montenegrin national bibliography is based. It includes publications whose authors (actual authors, translators, anthology editors, illustrators, photographers…) were born in Montenegro or originating from Montenegro; the publications published/issued or printed within the territory of Montenegro – independent of the authorship and theme; the publications thematically related to Montenegro – regardless of the authorship, language and place of publication.

The Montenegrina collection contains more than 40,000 books, many of them being unique and rare, and about 1,300 magazines and newspapers, with about 85,000 issues, among which unique and rare are Grlica (1835), Orlić (1865), Crnogorka (1871), Crnogorac (1871), Glas Crnogorca (1873) and Prosvjeta (1889). Old Montenegrin periodicals collection includes 175 titles, or more than 12,000 issues. Modern / current magazines and newspapers include titles since 1946, to date.

The Legacies NLM "Đurđe Crnojević", special or gift libraries of prominent Montenegrin creators, have the status of national cultural heritage. They consist of books, archive materials, and personal belongings of seven contributors: Dr Pero Soc (1884-1966, Doctor of Literature, Historian, Minister for Foreign Affairs in the Kingdom of Montenegro), Nikola Djonovic (1885-1974, lawyer, politician and publicist), Dr Pavle Mijovic (1914-1996, Art Historian, Doctor of Historical Sciences, publicist, member of the Montenegrin Academy of Sciences and Arts), Dr Niko S. Martinovic (1914-1975, lawyer, writer, philosopher, journalist, editor of the daily newspaper Pobjeda (1947-1948), Director of Historical Institute of Montenegro (1948-1949), Director of NLM "Djurdje Crnojevic" (1957-1973), member of the Serbian Academy of Arts and Sciences), Dušan Gvozdenovic (1917-1993, mathematician, university professor, publicist, author of textbooks in geometry and algebra for elementary schools and faculties), Radivoje-Lola Djukic (1923-1995, television, theater and movie director and humorist, writer and journalist, painter, one of the founders of the Belgrade TV), and Dr Dusan J. Martinovic (1933-2010, Doctor of Geography, writer, member of the Montenegrin Academy of Sciences and Arts (CANU), bibliographer, publisher, director of high school in Cetinje (1963-1973), Director of NLM "Djurdje Crnojevic" (1976-1991), chief editor of "Crnogorska bibliografija 1494-1994").

== Virtual library of Montenegro ==
The electronic catalog of NLM "Đurđe Crnojević" contains more than 220,000 bibliographic records, including books, serial publications, articles from journals and newspapers, and publications from special collections. The electronic catalog is available on the Internet at: http://vbcg.vbcg.me/cobiss/

== Digital library ==
NLM "Đurđe Crnojević", as a member of the Conference of European National Librarians (CENL), installed its own electronic catalog, as the common catalog of Montenegrin libraries, and a part of its digitized collections on the web portal of European national libraries - TEL (The European Library).

Digital collections are available at http://dlib.me/.
