= Biljarda =

Building in Cetinje, Montenegro

Coordinates: 42°23′15.9″N 18°55′23.5″E

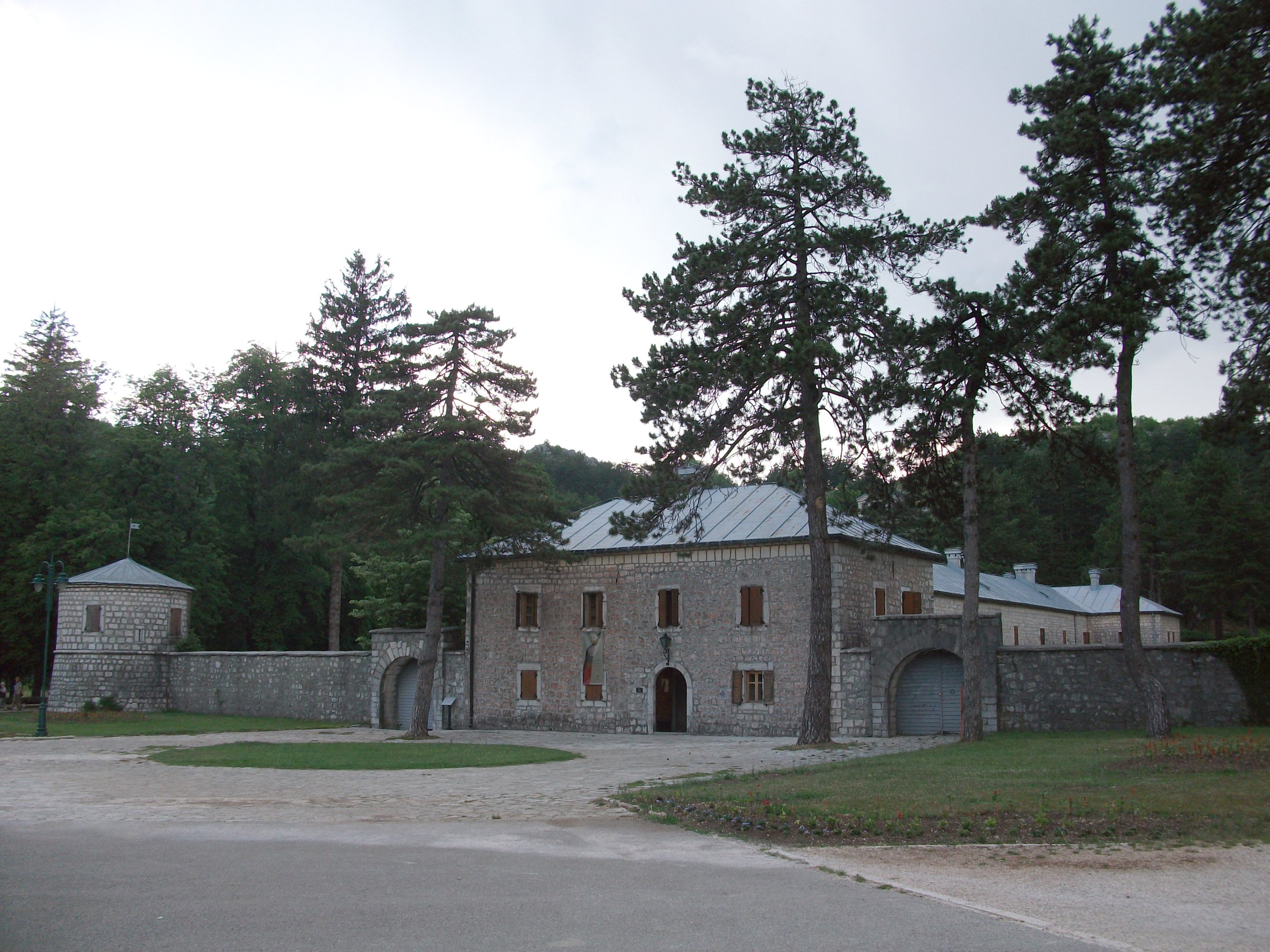
Biljarda

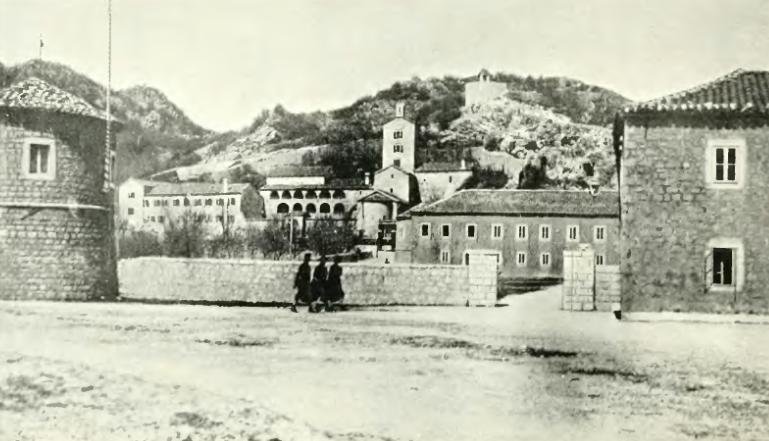
Biljarda and the Cetinje monastery at the start of the 20th century

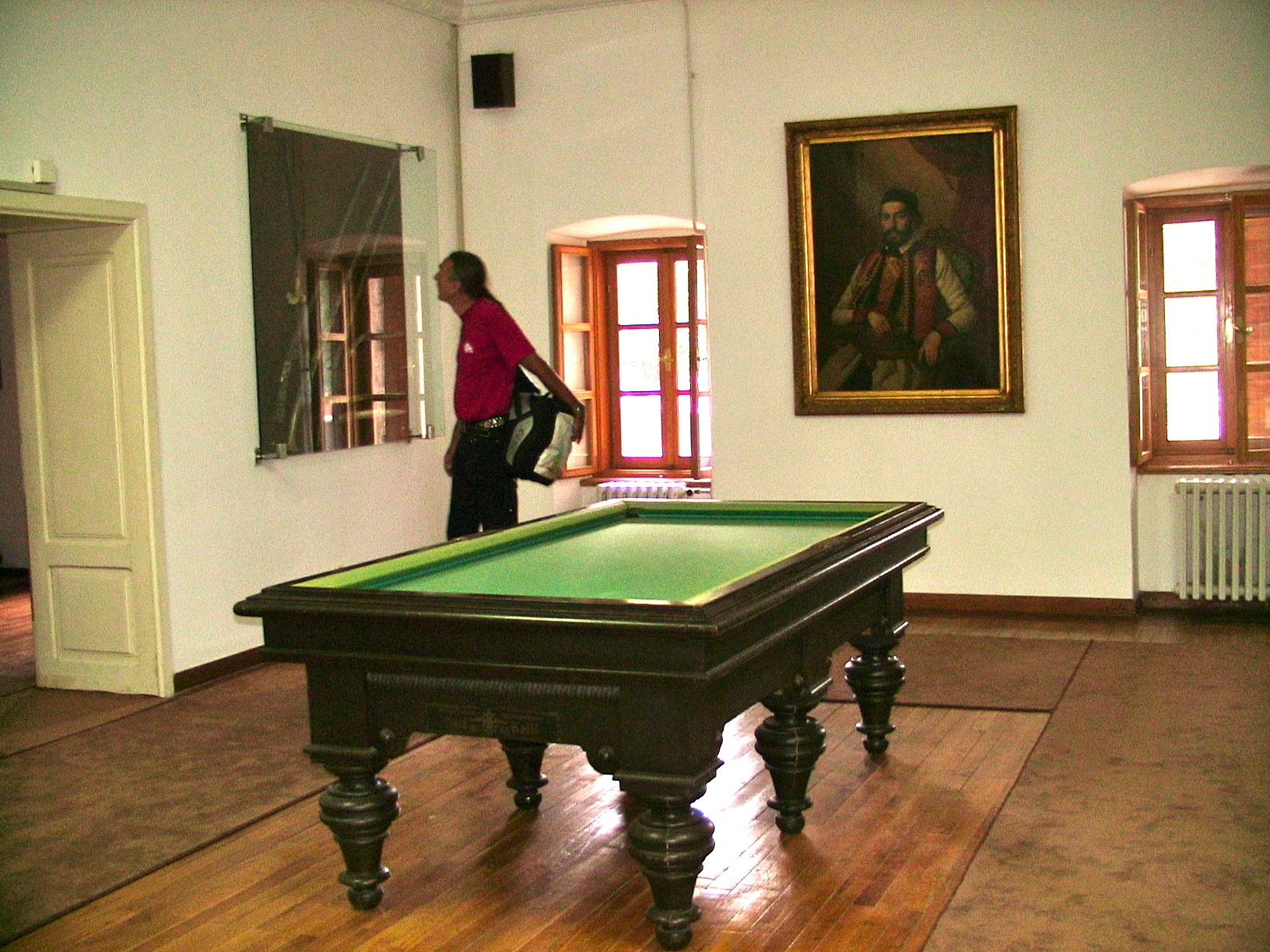
The pool table inside the palace

Biljarda (Serbian and Montenegrin Cyrillic: Биљарда) is a former royal residence in Cetinje, the historic capital of Montenegro. The palace is located in the historic center of Cetinje, near the Cetinje Monastery.

== History ==
Prince-Bishop Petar II Petrović-Njegoš started the building of the palace on 29 March 1838. Initially, it was called the 'New House', but soon it got its new name 'Biljarda' (Billiard House) after the central room on the first floor which contained a billiard table, the prince-bishop's favorite game.

Designed by the Russian Lieutenant Colonel Jakov Nikolaevich Ozeretskovsky, the Biljarda palace has the appearance of a medieval fortified feudal castle: a rectangular two-storied stone building, covered with lead, enclosed by a high stone wall with four defensive towers on the corners. At the time of its construction, it was an impressive building, over 70 metres in length and 7.5 metres wide. It contains eleven rooms on the ground floor and 14 rooms on the first floor.

The palace was not only the home of the prince-bishop, but also provided accommodation to the Senate and other state authorities as well as being a guest house for important visitors.

The palace served as a royal residence for Danilo I, Prince of Montenegro and his wife, Princess Darinka until 1860, for his nephew Nicholas I until 1867, when the Montenegrin royal family moved to King Nikola's Palace, previously designed to be home for Darinka, Princess Dowager of Montenegro and her daughter, Princess Olga. At the start of the 20th century, it housed various ministries and the two world wars it was used by the military. Currently, it is part of the National Museum of Montenegro.

== Bibliography ==
- Dušan D. Vuksan, »Biljarda vladike Rada«, Zapisi : glasnik Cetinjskog istorijskog društva, knj. 25., 1-2, Cetinje, 1941., str. 15.,
- Risto J. Dragićević (6. rujna 1901. - 15. prosinca 1980.), »Njegoševa biljarda«, Istoriski zapisi : organ Istoriskog društva Narodne Republike Crne Gore, God. I., br. 3. — 4., Cetinje, 1948., str. 113. — 138.
- Jevto Milović, »Njegoševa „Biljarda”«, Istoriski zapisi : organ Istoriskog društva Narodne Republike Crne Gore, ISSN 0021-2652, God. IV., knj. VII., br. 1–3, Cetinje, 1951., str. 1. – 15.,
