= Petar Lubarda =

Serbian painter (1907–1974)

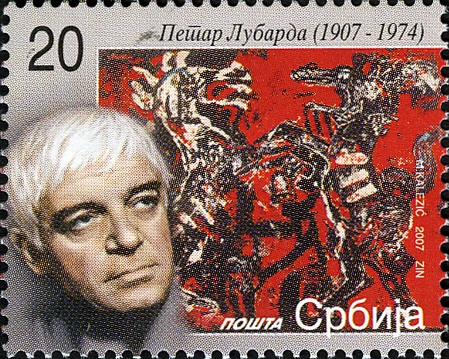
- Petar Lubarda on a 2007 stamp issued by Serbian Post
- Born: 27 July 1907; Ljubotinj, Principality of Montenegro
- Died: 13 February 1974 (aged 66); Belgrade, SR Serbia, Yugoslavia

Petar Lubarda (Serbian Cyrillic: Петар Лубарда; 27 July 1907 – 13 February 1974) was a Serbian painter.

== Biography ==
Letter by Petar Lubarda; he requested that the biographical information written in the letter be used in all of his future biographies.

He was born in Ljubotinj, near Cetinje, Principality of Montenegro. Lubarda's father was an officer of the Royal Yugoslav Army who was killed by the Yugoslav Partisans, which left a mark on Lubarda's career and upbringing. He spent a part of the war years in a German prison camp. Lubarda self-declared as a Serb and sent a letter demanding that this information be included as a part of his biography in upcoming art catalogues as well as demanding that his work be presented as a part of Serbia's pavilion.

He studied painting in Belgrade and Paris. From 1932 until his death he lived in Belgrade, with exception of period 1946–1950 when he was a professor at an art school in Herceg Novi. His work is inspired by Serbian history and Montenegrin landscape.

His most preferred subject was the historic 1389 Battle of Kosovo, which Lubarda painted in various formats in more than 30 versions.

Lubarda won numerous awards including the prestigious Herder Prize, Medal of Honour by Calcutta Art Society in 1968 and many other awards in Europe, Brazil, New York City and Tokyo Biennale.

The house used by Petar Lubarda and his wife Vera located in Senjak, Belgrade, was turned into an art gallery featuring notable works by Lubarda and personal items.

== Exhibitions ==
- Gymnasium, Nikšić, 1925
- Casa dell' Arte Moderna Bragaglio, Rome, 1929
- French club, Belgrade, 1933
- Art pavilion, Belgrade, 1934
- Art gallery ULUS, Belgrade, 1951
- Galerie Yougoslavie, Paris, 1952
- Galerie Michel Warren, Paris, 1954
- Leicester Galleries, London, 1955
- Art pavilion, Podgorica, 1958
- Small gallery, Ljubljana, 1959
- Gallery of, Belgrade, 1961
- Galleria Penelope, Rome, 1962
- Gallery of House of JNA, Belgrade, 1962
- Rabotnički university, Skopje, 1963
- Gallery of House of JNA, Belgrade, 1964
- Museum of Contemporary Art, retrospective, Belgrade, 1967
- Contemporary Art Museum of Macedonia, Skopje, 1967
- Art Gallery "Josip Bepo Benković", Herceg Novi, 1967
- Art pavilion, Podgorica, 1968
- Art museum SR Montenegro, Cetinje, 1968
- National museum, Kragujevac, 1968
- Art gallery of Belgrade Cultural Centre, 1968
- SANU Gallery, Belgrade, 1969
- House of culture "Olga Petrov", Opovo, 1969
- City museum, Sombor, 1970
- Art gallery, House of culture in Vrbas, 1970
- Art gallery of Belgrade Cultural Centre, Belgrade, 1971

Posthumous

- National museum, Belgrade, 1974
- Commemorative Exhibition, Skopje, 1974
- Lubarda's atelier, commemorative exhibition, Belgrade, 1974
- Collegium artisticum, retrospective, Sarajevo, 1978
- Modern gallery, Budva, 1978
- Modern gallery, retrospective, Ljubljana, 1978
- Museum of contemporary art, Belgrade, 1984
- Gallery of art of non-aligned countries "Josip Broz Tito", Podgorica
- Modern gallery, Budva, 1985
- Forum gallery, Nikšić, 1986
- Art Gallery "Josip Bepo Benković", Herceg Novi, 1989
- Biljarda, Cetinje, 1994
- Contemporary Art Museum of Macedonia, Skopje, 1998
- Gallery "Nikola I", Nikšić, 2000
- Palace of Nikola I, Bar, 2000
- Galeria Lorber, Shenkar College of Engineering and Design, Ramat-Gan, Israel, 2004
- Gallery of Radio Television of Serbia, Belgrade, 2007
- Belgrade gallery, Belgrade, 2007
- Heritage house, Belgrade, 2014

== Awards ==
- Grand Prix, World exhibit, Paris, 1937
- I award at an international exhibition, The Hague, 1939
- I federal award of Yugoslavia, Belgrade, 1948
- I state award of SR Montenegro, Cetinje, 1948
- I state award of SR Montenegro, Цетиње, 1949
- International award, Biennale, São Paulo, 1953
- Biennale award, Tokyo, 1955
- October award of city of Belgrade, Belgrade, 1955
- National award - Guggenheim, New York City, 1956
- 7 July award, Belgrade, 1964
- Order of brotherhood and unity, Belgrade, 1965
- Order of merit for the people with golden wreath, Belgrade, 1965
- AVNOJ award, Belgrade, 1966
- I award of gallery „13th November“, Cetinje, 1967
- Diploma of city of Belgrade, Belgrade, 1969
- Medal of Honour "Tagore" by Calcutta Art Society, Kolkata, 1970
- Herder Prize, Vienna, 1973
- Honorary citizen of Slovenj Gradec
- Honorary citizen of Kragujevac
