= Cetinje =

Town in Montenegro

Cetinje Цетиње
- Town and municipality
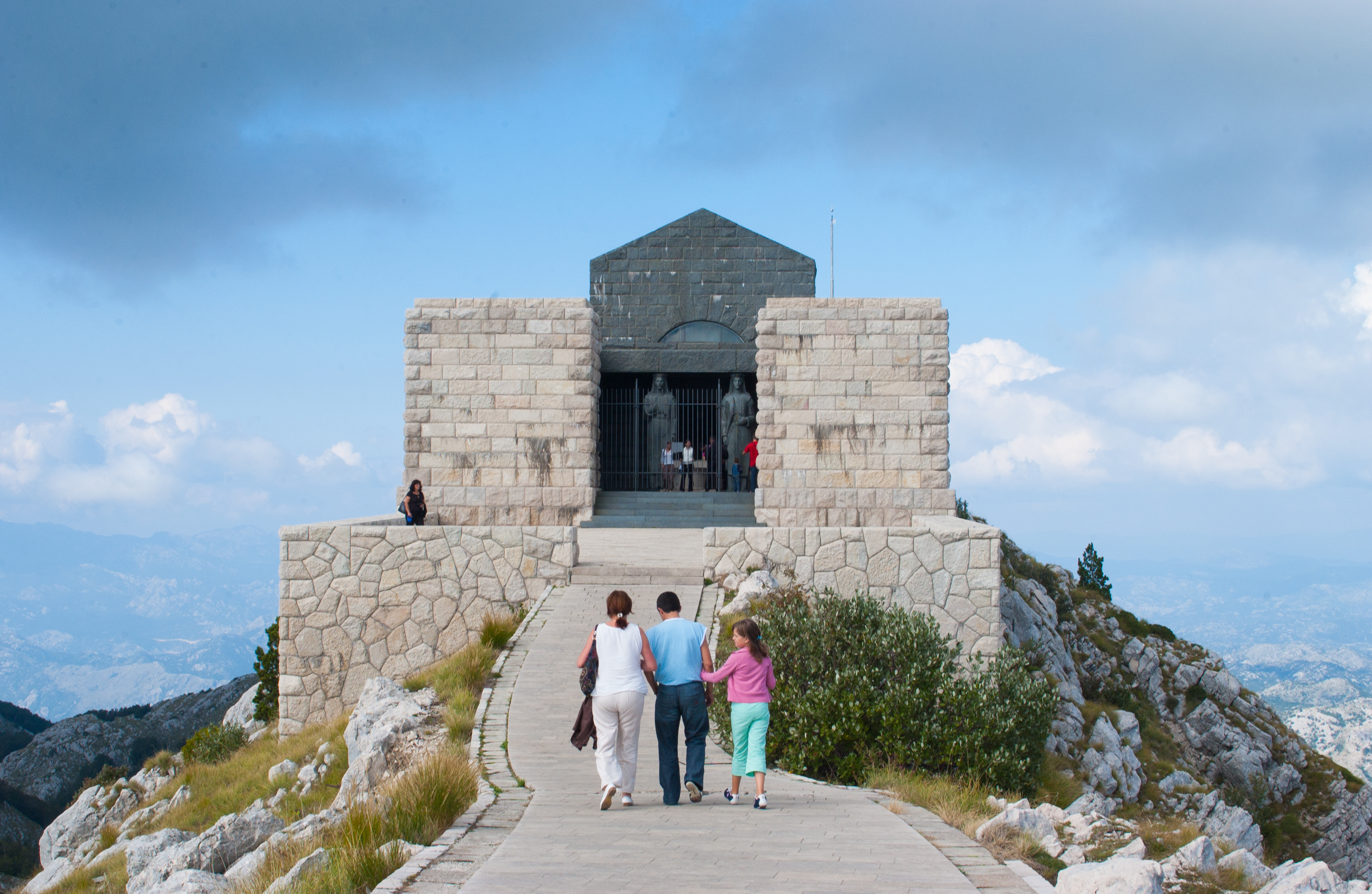
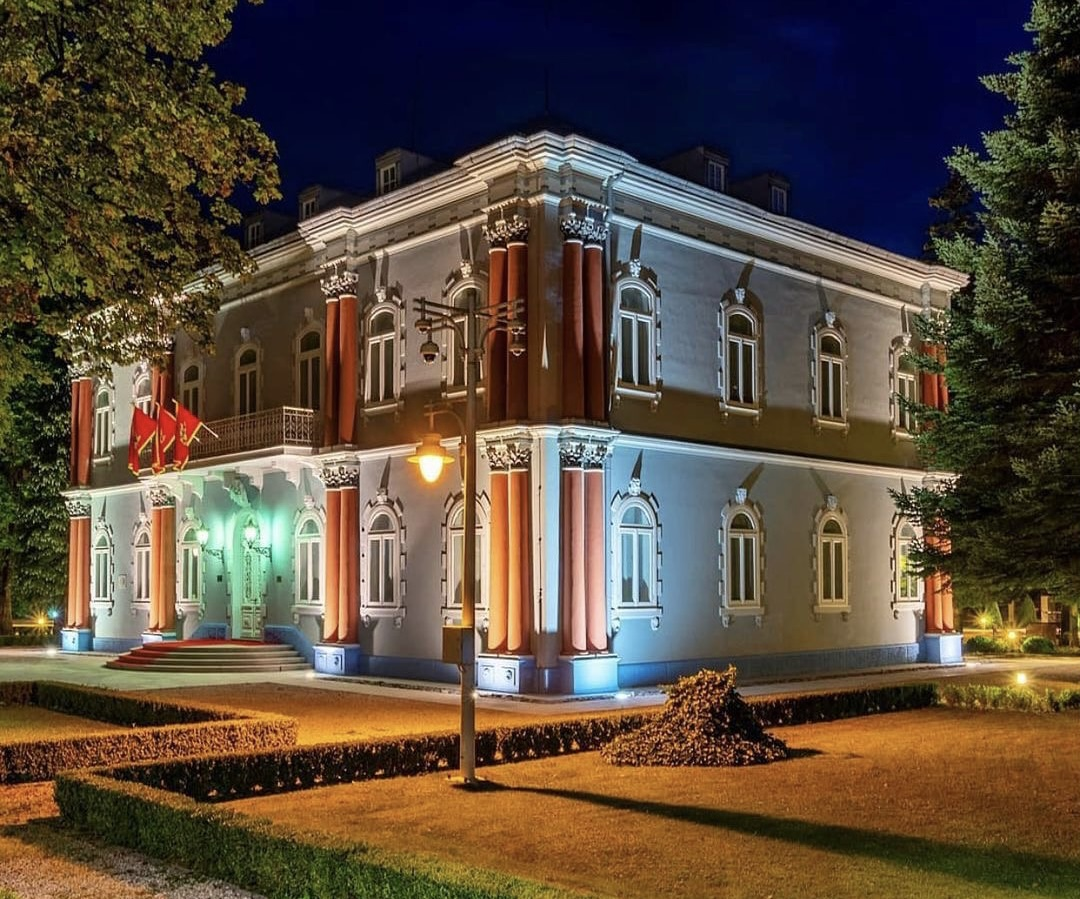
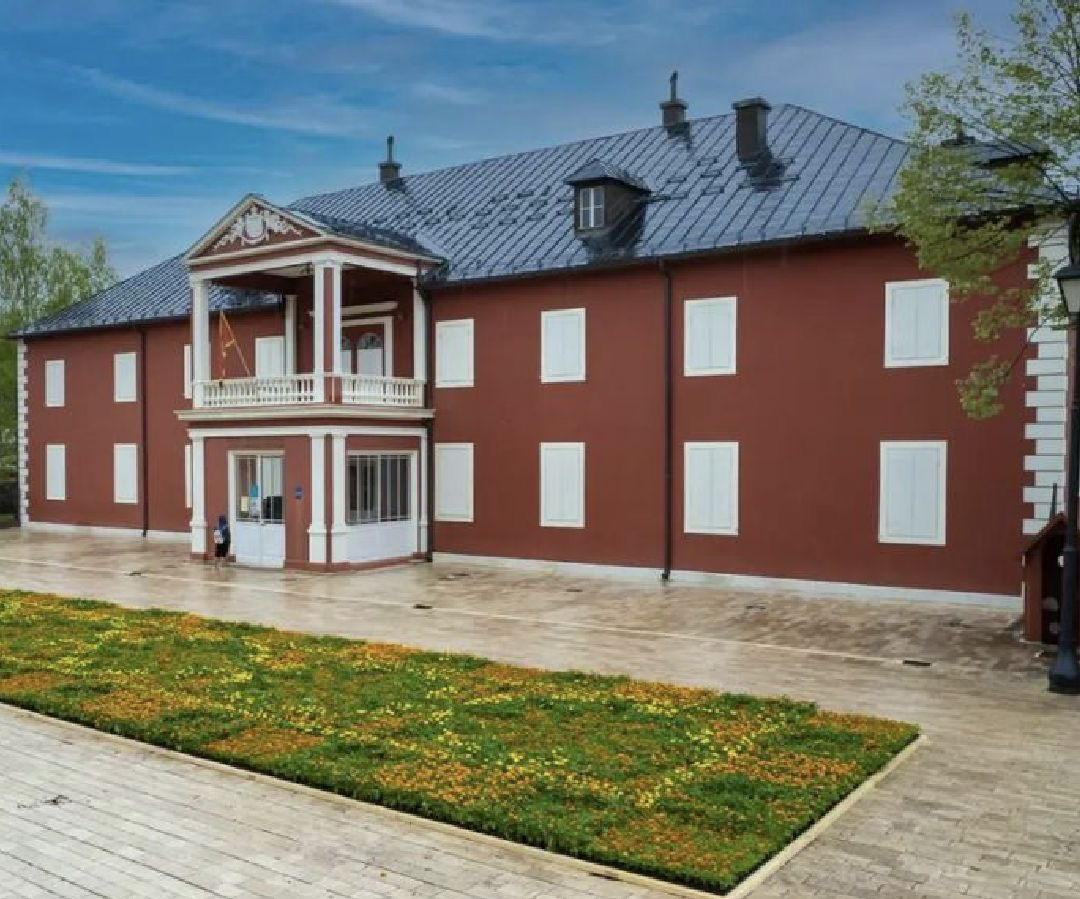
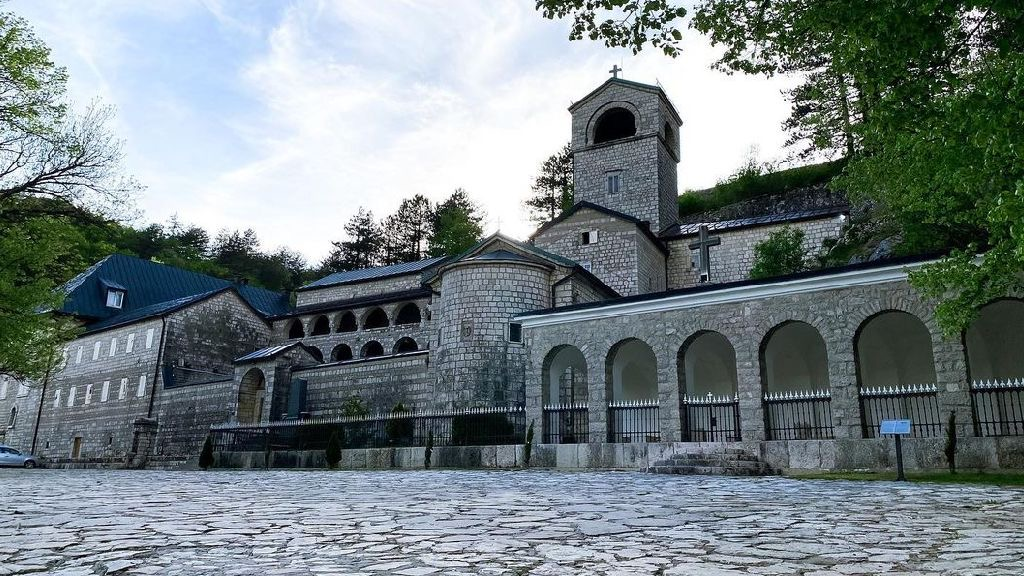
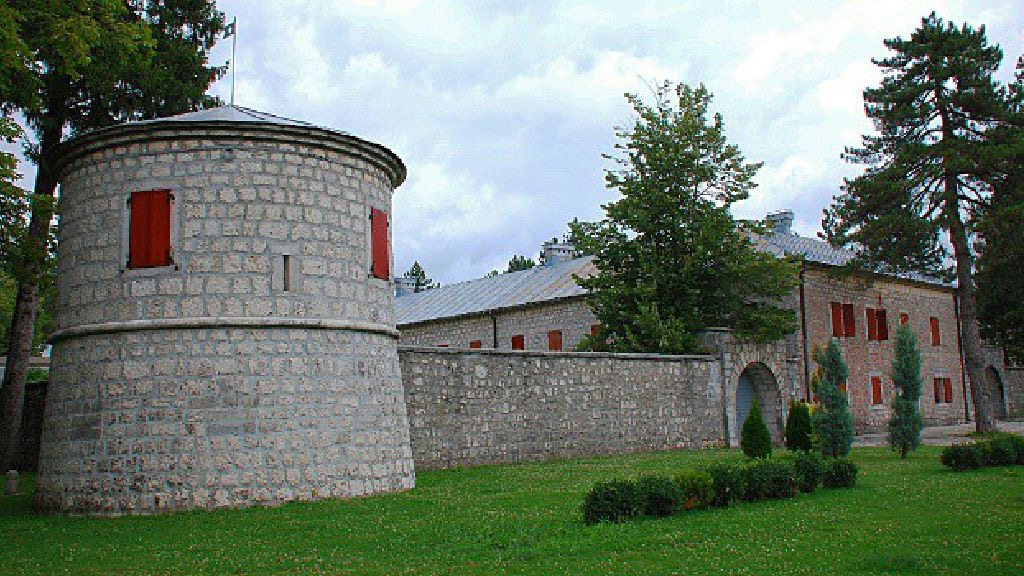
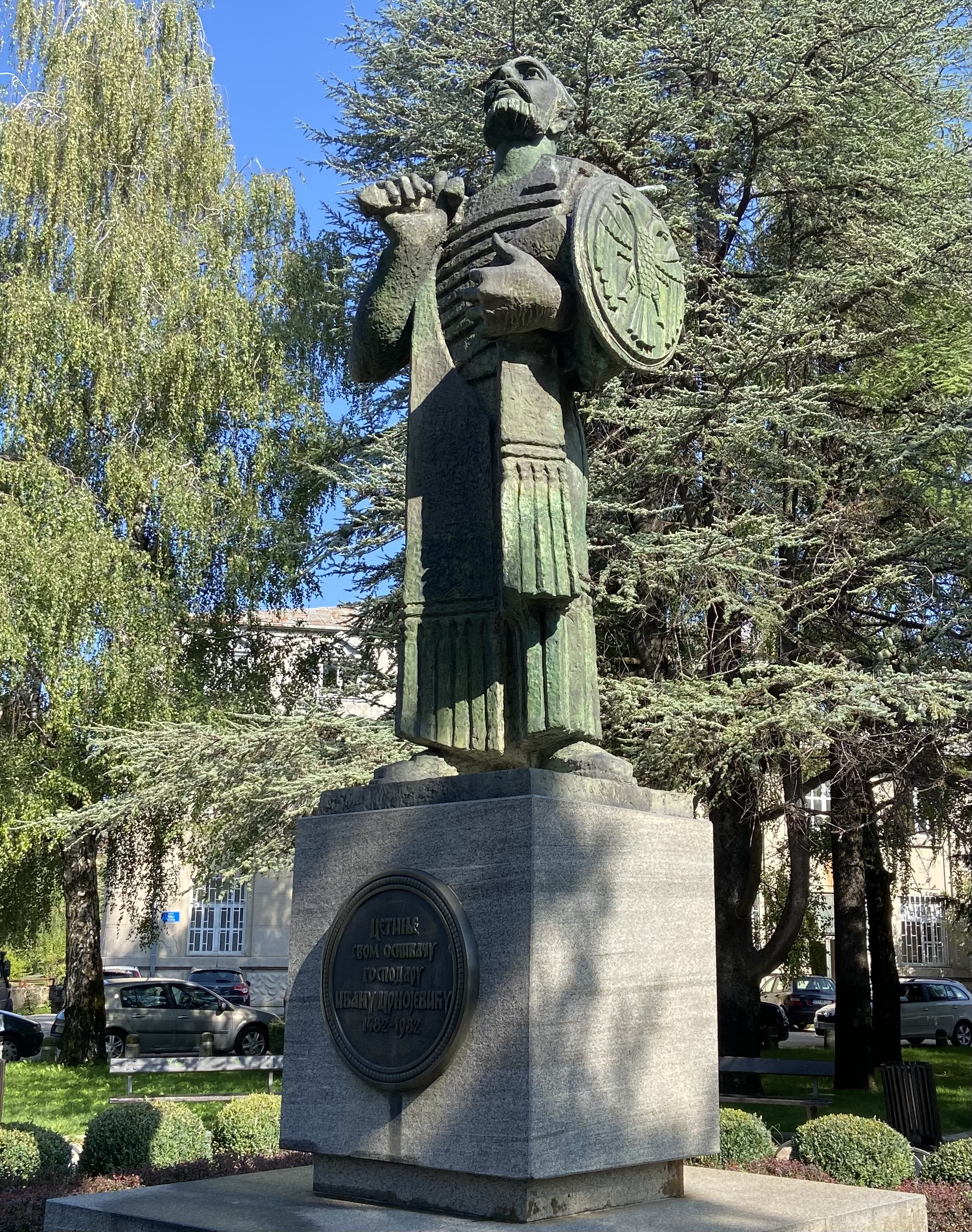
- Clockwise from top: Mausoleum of Petar II Petrović-Njegoš, King Nicholas Museum, Biljarda, Monument of Ivan Crnojević, Cetinje Monastery and Blue Palace.

- Flag Coat of arms
- Nickname: Valley of the Gods
- Location of Cetinje Cetinje (Europe)
- Coordinates: 42°23′22″N 18°55′29″E
- Country: Montenegro
- Region: Central
- Municipality: Old Royal Capital Cetinje
- Founded by Ivan Crnojević: AD 1482; 544 years ago
- Settlements: 94

Government
  - Type: Mayor-Assembly
  - Lord Mayor: Nikola Đurašković (SDP)

Area
  - Town and municipality: 910 km^{2} (350 sq mi)
- Elevation: 650 m (2,130 ft)

Population (2023 census)
  - Rank: 15th in Montenegro
  - Density: 20/km^{2} (52/sq mi)
  - Urban: 12,460 ▼
  - Rural: 2,005 ▼
  - Municipality: 14,465 ▼
- Demonym: Cetinjan
- Time zone: UTC+1 (CET)
  - Summer (DST): UTC+2 (CEST)
- Postal code: 81250
- Area code: +382 41
- ISO 3166-2 code: ME-06
- Car plates: CT
- Climate: Cfb
- Website: www.cetinje.me

Cetinje (Montenegrin Cyrillic: Цетиње, pronounced [t͡sětiɲe]) is a town in Montenegro. It is the former royal capital (Montenegrin: prijestonica / приjестоница) of Montenegro and is the location of several national institutions, including the official residence of the president of Montenegro.

According to the 2023 census, the town had a population of 12,460 while the Cetinje Municipality had 14,465 residents. Cetinje is the centre of Cetinje Municipality. The city rests on a small karst plain surrounded by limestone mountains, including Mount Lovćen, the legendary mountain in Montenegrin historiography. Cetinje was founded in the 15th century and became a cradle of the culture of Montenegro. Its status as the honorary capital of Montenegro is due to its heritage as a long-serving former capital of Montenegro.

== Name ==
In Montenegrin it is known as Cetinje (Цетиње; archaically Цетинѣ (Cetině)); in Italian as Cettigne; in Greek as Κετίγνη (Ketígni); in Turkish as Çetince (means toughly); and in Albanian as Cetina.

According to the written data, by the end of the 17th century, down the plain flowed the River Cetina, so that part of the town was called by that river Cetinjsko polje (The field of Cetinje). In Cetinjsko polje, at that time there used to be a small inhabited village, by which the later newly created town got name Cetinje. In the historical documents, Cetinje is mentioned for the first time in 1440.

== History ==
Timeline of Cetinje
Historical affiliations

Principality of Zeta, 1482–1496
Ottoman Empire, 1496–1528
Montenegro vilayet, 1528–1697
Prince-Bishopric of Montenegro, 1697–1852
Principality of Montenegro, 1852–1910
Kingdom of Montenegro, 1910–1916
Austria-Hungary 1916–1918
Kingdom of Yugoslavia, 1918–1941
Kingdom of Italy, (Italian governorate of Montenegro) 1941–1943
German Reich, (German-occupied territory of Montenegro) 1943–1944
Democratic Federal Yugoslavia 1944–1946
Socialist Federal Republic of Yugoslavia (Socialist Republic of Montenegro) 1946–1992
Federal Republic of Yugoslavia (Republic of Montenegro) 1992–2003
Serbia and Montenegro (Republic of Montenegro) 2003–2006
Montenegro, 2006–present

=== Founding ===
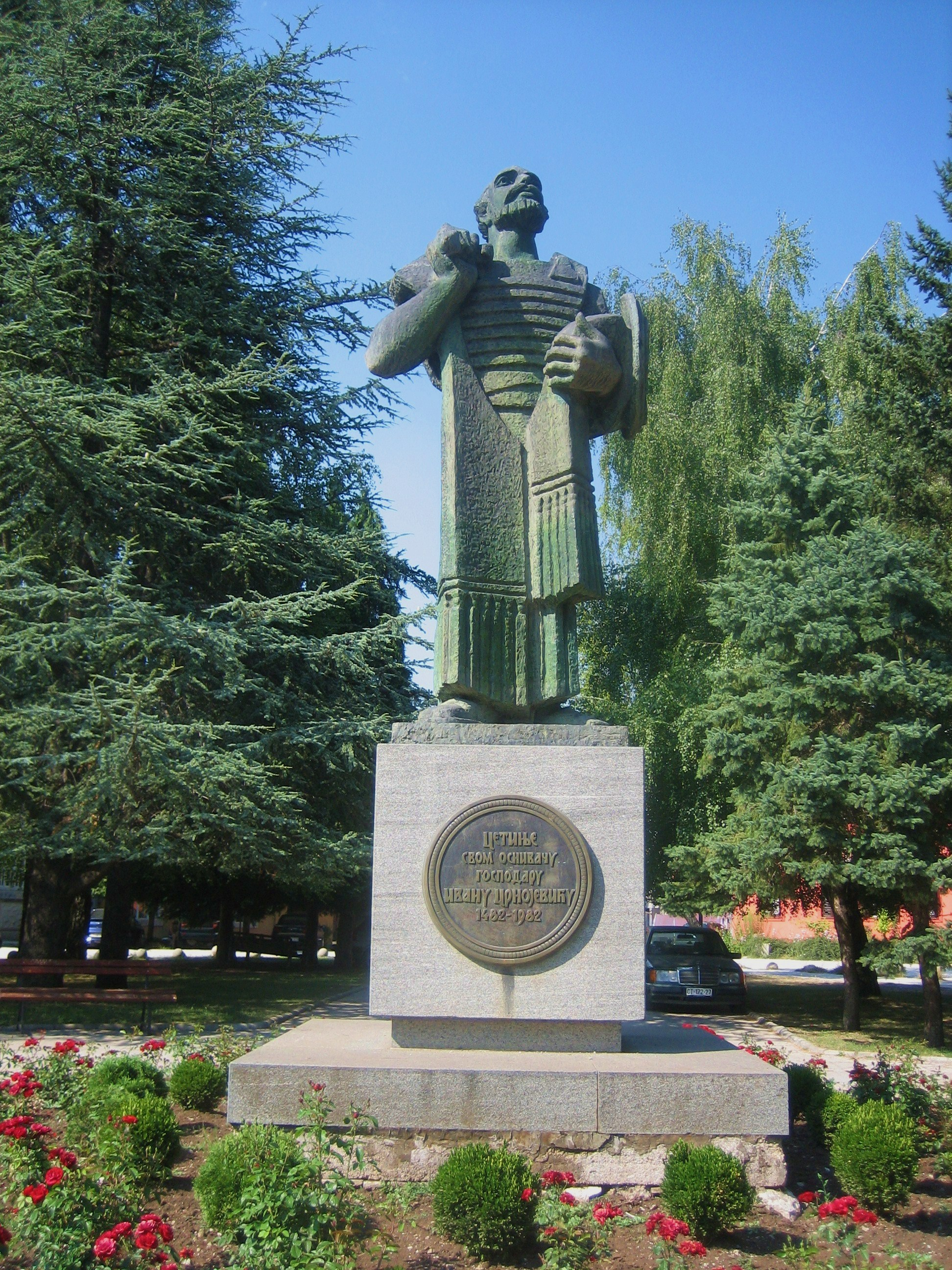
Statue of Ivan Crnojević

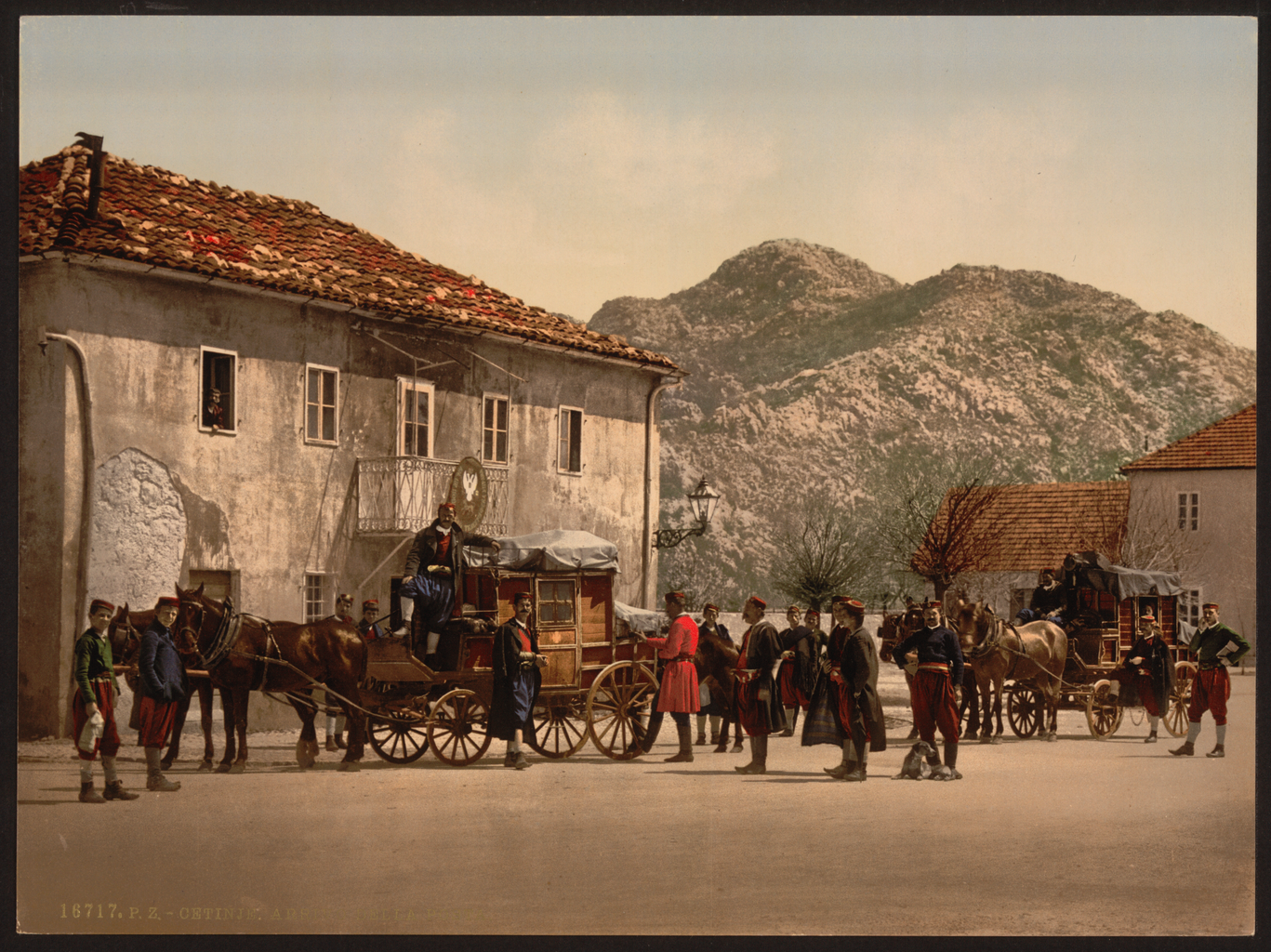
Arrival of the Post Cetinje

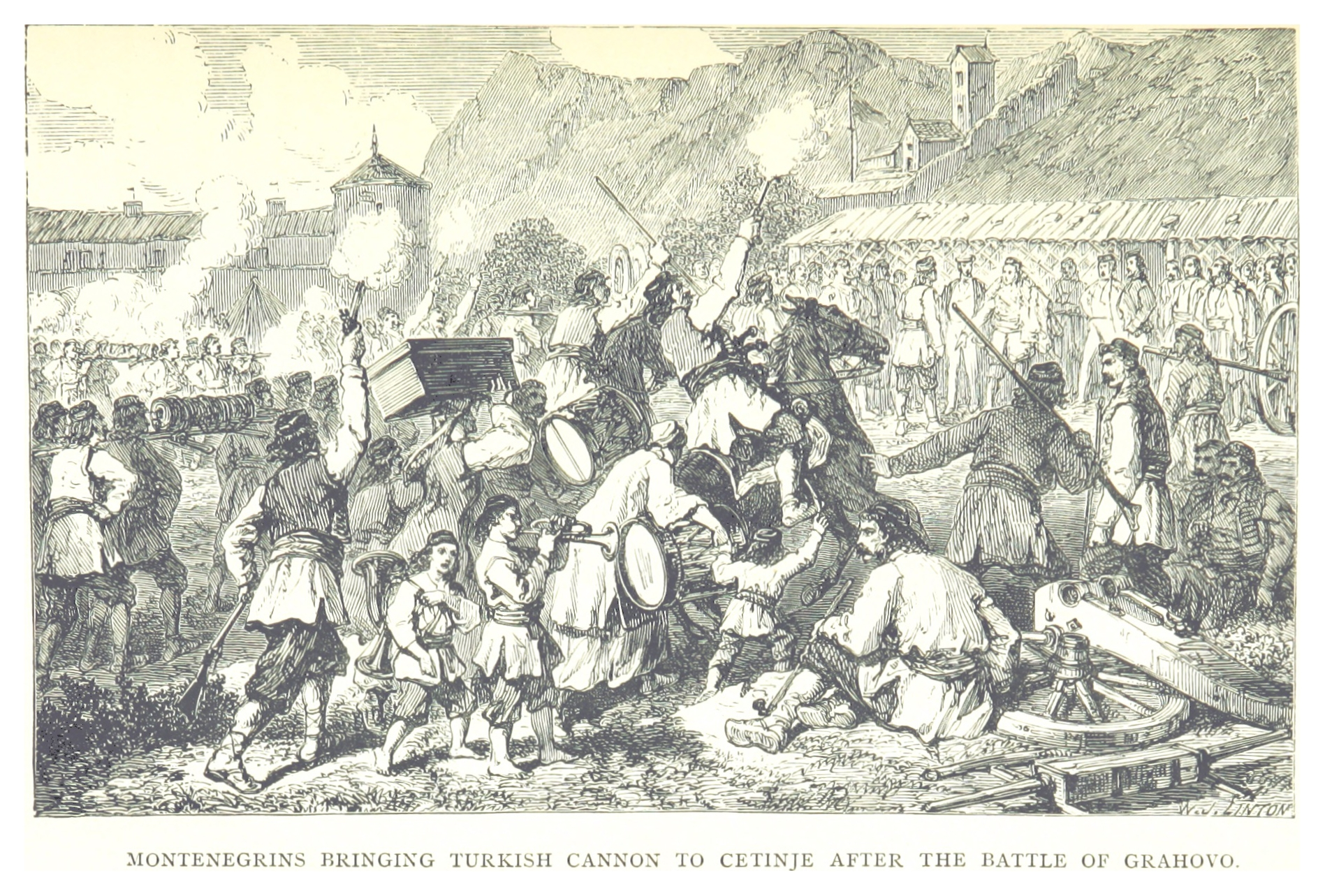
Mackenzie (1877) after the battle of Grahovo

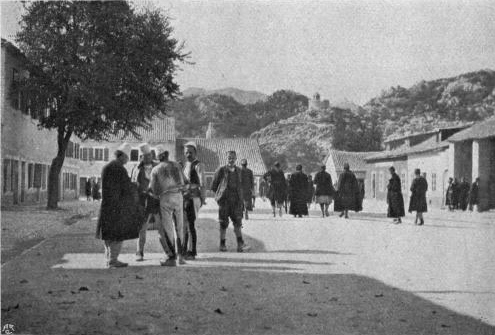
Albanians in Cetinje, 1906

Cetinje was founded in 1482, when Ivan Crnojević moved his capital from Obod above the Crnojević River to deeper into the hills to a more easily defended location in a field at the foot of Mount Lovćen. He had his court built at the new location that year and also founded a monastery (dedicated to the Mother of Christ) as a personal endowment in 1484. His court and the monastery are the first recorded renaissance buildings in Montenegro. Crnojević was forced to move the seat of the Eparchy of Zeta from Vranjina to Cetinje due to the Ottoman invasions, in 1485. The town was named after the Cetina river.

The bishopric of Zeta was elevated to a metropolitanate in Cetinje. It was later to play an important part in both the religious and national life. The Crnojević printing house, the first printing house in southeastern Europe, was active between 1493 and 1496 in Cetinje. Zeta was first put under Ottoman rule in 1499, then annexed by the Ottomans in 1514, organized into the Sanjak of Montenegro.

=== Early modern period ===
In the next two centuries, the development of Cetinje stagnated. It was very often subject to attack by Venice and the Ottomans. The city therefore endured many privations in the course of the 16th and 17th centuries.

During this period the court and the monastery of the Crnojevići dynasty were destroyed. It was only at the end of the 17th century, in 1697, that Cetinje began to flourish again under the rule of the Petrović dynasty, refounded by Danilo Petrović.

=== Modern period ===
Leading the wars of liberation and strengthening the unity in the country occupied Danilo and his successors, so they were unable to devote enough effort to the further development of Cetinje. It was only during the rule of Petar II Petrović Njegoš that far greater progress was made. In 1838 his new royal residence called Biljarda (Billiard house) was built. Cetinje was enlarged by building new houses that gradually led to genuine urbanization.

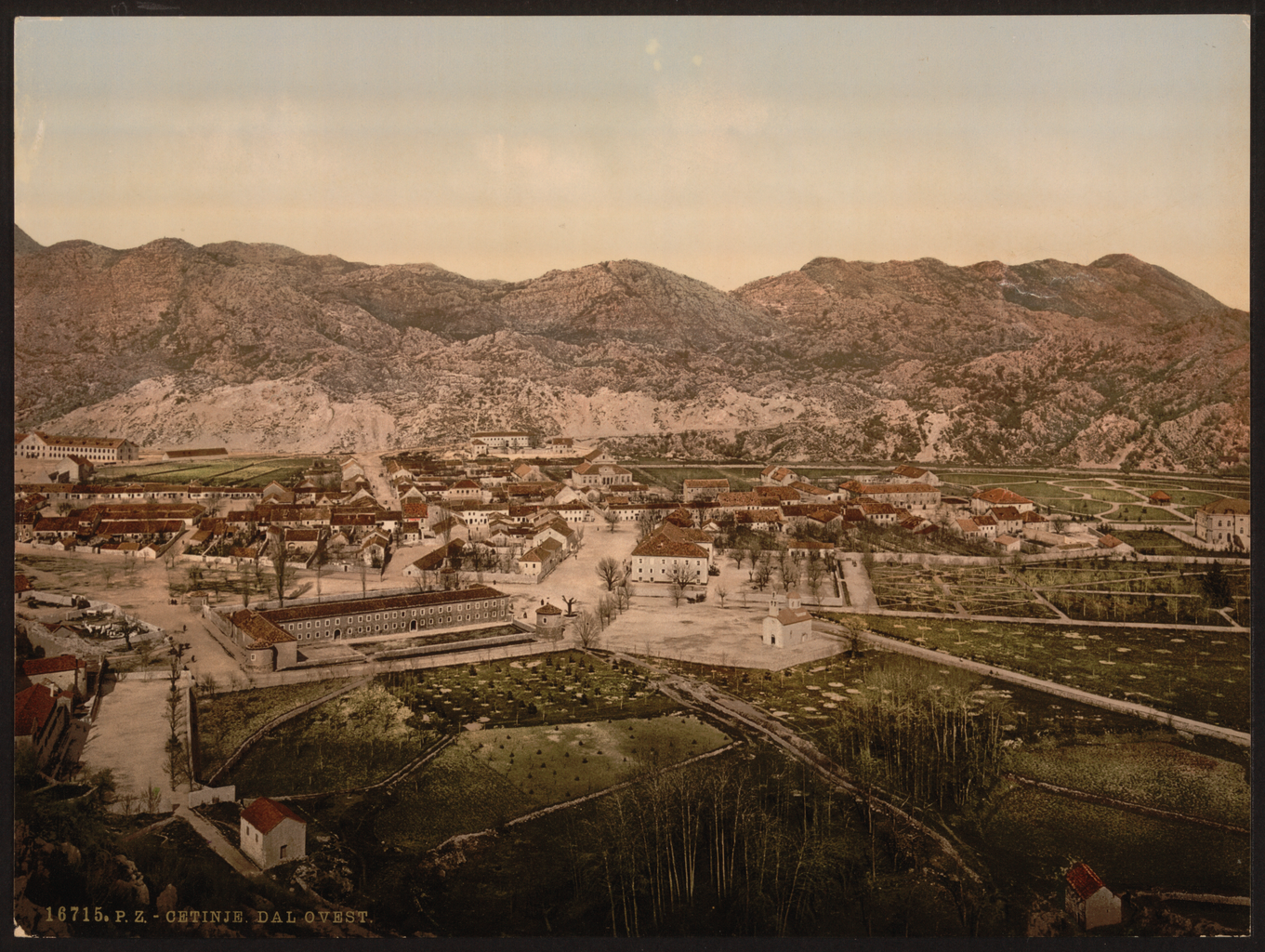
Cetinje

Many modern buildings designed for foreign consulates were built due to the newly established relations with various European countries, including the French, Russian, British, Italian and Austro-Hungarian consulates.

Cetinje made great progress under the rule of Prince Nikola I Petrović when numerous public edifices were built. Those include the first hotel, called 'Lokanda', then the new Prince's palace, the Girls' Institute and the hospital. This period also saw the first tenancy houses. In the 1860 census Cetinje had 34 households. After initially holding off Ottoman incursions in 1852 and 1853, Cetinje was captured by Ottoman Omar Pasha's forces during the Montenegrin–Ottoman War of 1861–62. Ottoman rule over Montenegro did not last much more than a decade however, as 14 years later the "Great War", the third successive contest between the two nations, ended in Montenegrin victory, with most previously-Montenegrin territory returning to their control.

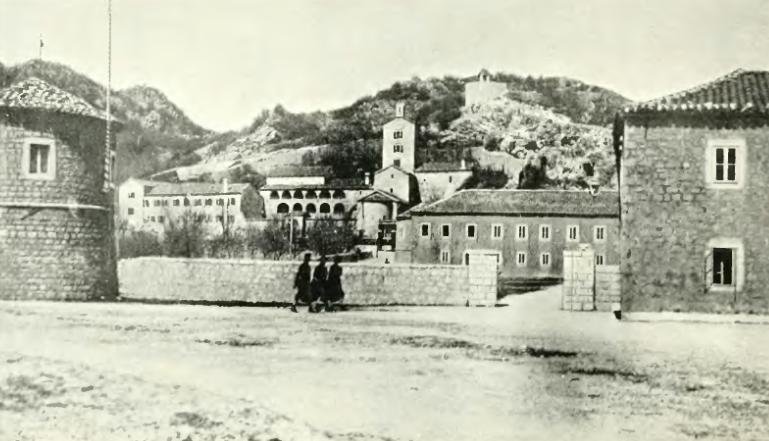
Cetinje Monastery

Montenegrin independence was recognized at the Congress of Berlin of 1878 and consequently Cetinje became the capital of a European country. Between 1878 and 1914 Cetinje flourished in every sense. Many renowned intellectuals from other South-Slavic parts came to stay there and made a contribution to the cultural, educational and every other aspect of life. Montenegro was proclaimed a kingdom in 1910. This had a great effect on Cetinje's development. At this time the Government House, the symbol of state power, was built. The population census from the same year recorded a massive growth in the world's smallest capital, registering 5,895 inhabitants.

In the Interwar period, Cetinje expanded its territory, as it was now a centre of the Zeta region. But when it was decided by the Parliament of Montenegro that the administrative organs should be located in Titograd (previously and currently Podgorica), Cetinje went through a harsh crisis. By building certain industrial sections and at the same time neglecting the development of the city's traditional and potential cultural and tourist capacities, the chance to create a strong basis for more solid prosperity was lost.

When Communist forces captured Cetinje in November 1944 the only population that stayed in the town were people who believed they have no reason to fear or hide from anybody. Still, as soon as Communists captured Cetinje, in the night of 13 November 1944, they shot without any trial 28 citizens of Cetinje. They were all summarily executed at "New Cemetery" of Cetinje in Humci.

On 12 August 2022, a mass shooting occurred in Cetinje, in which eleven people died, including the perpetrator, and six others were injured.

On 1 January 2025, another mass spree shooting occurred in Cetinje, in which fourteen people, including the perpetrator, were killed and three others were injured. The two mass shootings that have occurred in the same town are the deadliest in Montenegro's history.

== Administration ==
Cetinje is governed by the Lord Mayor and the Old Royal Capital Government. Since December 2021, the lord mayor of the Old Royal Capital Cetinje is Nikola Đurašković (SDP).

=== National institutions ===
Although Podgorica is the capital of Montenegro, Cetinje is the seat of numerous national institutions of Montenegro. The official residence of the president of Montenegro is in Cetinje, called the Blue Palace owing to the colour of its walls. Cetinje is the seat of the National Museum of Montenegro, Montenegro's National library and the State Archives of Montenegro.

=== Administrative and operational bodies ===
Administrative and operational bodies of local administration are secretaries, administrations, directorates, managements and services. There are six secretariats in the Old Royal Capital Cetinje: The Secretariat for Local Government, the Secretariat of Finance and Enterprise Development, the Secretariat of Spatial Planning and Environment Protection, the Secretariat for Utilities and Transport, the Secretariat for Culture and Sport and The Secretariat for Social Affairs and Youth. Other administrative bodies are Management of public revenue, Directorate for Property, Directorate of Investment and Development and Center for Information System. Operational bodies are Mayor's Service, Service of Chief Administrator, the City Manager's Service, Public relations Bureau, Common Affairs Service, Protection service and Communal Police.

== Municipal Parliament (2021–2025) ==
Skupština Prijestonice Cetinje is the Parliament of Old Royal Capital Cetinje. Local parliament is made up of 33 deputies, or odbornici (councillors) in Serbian. It is elected by universal ballot and is presided over by a speaker called the Predsjednik Skupštine (President of Parliament).

The composition of the parliament as of 2021 is as follows:

Party / Coalition	Seats	Local government
DPS	10 / 33	Opposition
SDP	8 / 33	Government
URA	4 / 33	Support
ZEP	4 / 33	Opposition
DCG	3 / 33	Support
SGLSCG	3 / 33	Government
SD	1 / 33	Opposition

=== Local subdivisions ===
There are two city settlements in the Old Royal Capital – Cetinje and Rijeka Crnojevića.

Old Royal Capital Cetinje is divided into 23 local community bodies (mjesne zajednice) in which the citizens participate in decisions on matters of relevance to the local community.

=== Settlements ===
The prijestonica of Cetinje is divided into two urban settlements: Cetinje and Rijeka Crnojevića, and 92 rural settlements: Bajice, Barjamovica, Bijele Poljane, Bjeloši, Bobija, Boguti, Bokovo, Češljari, Čevo, Dide, Dobrska Župa, Dobrsko Selo, Dodoši, Donja Zaljut, Donje Selo, Dragomi Do, Drušići, Dubovik, Dubovo, Dugi Do, Dujeva, Đalci, Đinovići, Erakovići, Gađi, Gornja Zaljut, Gornji Ceklin, Grab, Gradina, Građani, Izvori, Jankovići, Jezer, Kobilji Do, Kopito, Kosijeri, Kranji Do, Kućišta, Lastva, Lipa, Lješev Stub, Majstori, Malošin Do, Markovina, Meterizi, Mikulići, Milijevići, Mužovići, Njeguši, Obzovica, Očinići, Oćevići, Ožegovice, Pačarađe, Pejovići, Petrov Do, Poda, Podbukovica, Prediš, Prekornica, Prentin Do, Prevlaka, Proseni Do, Radomir, Raičevići, Resna, Riječani, Rokoči, Rvaši, Ržani Do, Smokovci, Šinđon, Štitari, Tomići, Trešnjevo, Trnjine, Uba, Ubli, Ublice, Ugnji, Ulići, Velestovo, Vignjevići, Vojkovići, Vrba, Vrela, Vuči Do, Zabrđe, Začir, Zagora, Žabljak Crnojevića and Žanjev Do.

== Geography ==
Cetinje is situated in the karst field (Cetinje field) of about 7 km^{2} (2.7 sq mi), with average height above sea level of 671 m (2,201 ft). It is 12 km (7.5 mi) of airline far from Adriatic Sea and 15 km (9.3 mi) from Skadar Lake. Now, it is on the main road Podgorica-Cetinje-Budva, which makes it open to the interior of Montenegro and the Montenegrin coast.

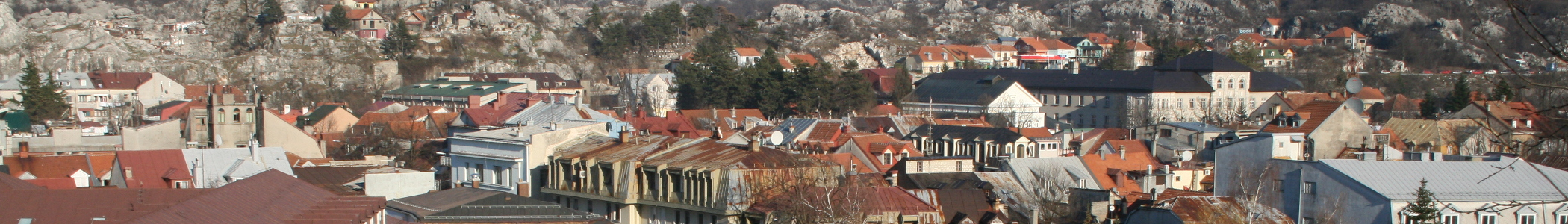
Cetinje panoramic view.

=== Climate ===
Cetinje has an oceanic climate (Köppen climate classification: Cfb), with relatively dry and warm summers, and mild and wet winters.

Cetinje is well known for its plentiful precipitations, and is one of the rainiest towns in Europe with around 3,300 mm (130 in) of precipitation annually. Although abundant in precipitation, the Cetinje field and its surroundings do not have water flows on the surface and water sources are scarce. This is a consequence of the karst configuration and its geologic structure.

Climate data for Cetinje (1961–1990, extremes 1946–present)
Month	Jan	Feb	Mar	Apr	May	Jun	Jul	Aug	Sep	Oct	Nov	Dec	Year
Record high °C (°F)	19.1 (66.4)	22.8 (73.0)	23.2 (73.8)	27.8 (82.0)	31.4 (88.5)	35.1 (95.2)	38.2 (100.8)	39.0 (102.2)	36.0 (96.8)	29.6 (85.3)	25.1 (77.2)	18.5 (65.3)	39.0 (102.2)
Mean daily maximum °C (°F)	6.4 (43.5)	7.3 (45.1)	10.6 (51.1)	14.7 (58.5)	20.0 (68.0)	23.7 (74.7)	27.2 (81.0)	27.1 (80.8)	23.2 (73.8)	17.9 (64.2)	12.2 (54.0)	8.0 (46.4)	16.5 (61.8)
Daily mean °C (°F)	0.6 (33.1)	1.6 (34.9)	4.6 (40.3)	8.9 (48.0)	13.8 (56.8)	17.2 (63.0)	19.7 (67.5)	18.9 (66.0)	14.8 (58.6)	9.8 (49.6)	5.7 (42.3)	2.1 (35.8)	9.8 (49.7)
Mean daily minimum °C (°F)	−4.0 (24.8)	−2.9 (26.8)	−0.4 (31.3)	3.2 (37.8)	7.3 (45.1)	10.2 (50.4)	12.0 (53.6)	11.4 (52.5)	8.4 (47.1)	4.0 (39.2)	1.0 (33.8)	−2.3 (27.9)	4.0 (39.2)
Record low °C (°F)	−22.8 (−9.0)	−19.9 (−3.8)	−15.4 (4.3)	−9.0 (15.8)	−1.5 (29.3)	0.5 (32.9)	4.0 (39.2)	4.5 (40.1)	−2.9 (26.8)	−9.3 (15.3)	−12.3 (9.9)	−20.4 (−4.7)	−22.8 (−9.0)
Average precipitation mm (inches)	429.5 (16.91)	351.1 (13.82)	368.9 (14.52)	277.3 (10.92)	157.4 (6.20)	100.6 (3.96)	66.3 (2.61)	112.3 (4.42)	191.0 (7.52)	293.0 (11.54)	499.9 (19.68)	455.8 (17.94)	3,303.1 (130.04)
Average precipitation days (≥ 0.1 mm)	13	13	14	13	11	10	7	7	7	11	15	15	136
Average relative humidity (%)	84	84	80	77	76	75	70	72	80	83	86	87	80
Source: Hydrological and Meteorological Service of Montenegro

== Demographics ==
According to the Montenegro statistical office, in 2023 in the town of Cetinje lived 12,460 inhabitants. According to the number of inhabitants, Cetinje is one of the medium units of local government in Montenegro. Cetinje Municipality has a population of 14,465.

Historical population
Year	Pop.	±%
1948	9,038	—
1953	9,102	+0.7%
1961	9,359	+2.8%
1971	11,876	+26.9%
1981	14,088	+18.6%
1991	15,946	+13.2%
2003	15,137	−5.1%
2011	13,918	−8.1%
2023	12,460	−10.5%

=== Ethnicity ===
Ethnicity	Number	Percentage
Montenegrins	12,705	91.3%
Serbs	539	3.9%
Albanians	37	0.3%
Croats	37	0.3%
Roma	28	0.2%
other and undeclared	572	4.1%
Total	13,918	100%

=== Language ===
Language	Number	Percentage
Montenegrin	11,656	83.8%
Serbian	1,426	10.2%
Serbo-Croatian	226	1.6%
other and undeclared	610	4.4%
Total	13,918	100%

=== Religion ===
Source: Statistical Office of Montenegro – MONSTAT, Census 2011

Religion	Number	Percentage
Eastern Orthodoxy	12,844	92.28%
Atheism	233	1.67%
Catholicism	133	0.95%
Islam	103	0.74%
Other	178	1.27%
not declared	364	2.61%
Total	13,918	100%

== Economy ==
=== Public works ===
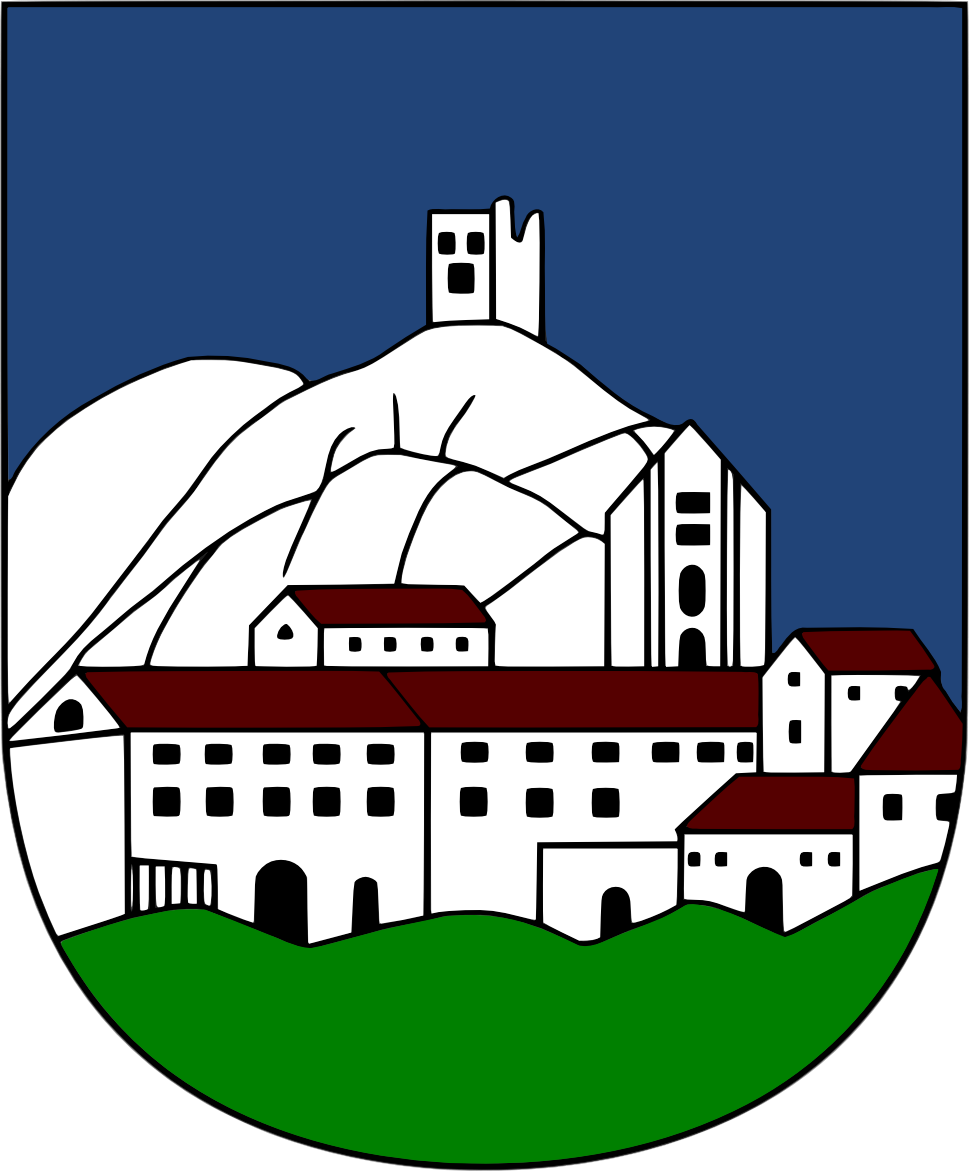
Coat of arms of Cetinje until 1945.

After the decades of stagnation, the new city government began a lot of projects with the intention to revitalise the infrastructure, business and to gain a higher promotion of Cetinje in cultural, touristic and other parts. Some of that projects were the reconstruction of Cetinje Historical Core (Main Street – Njegoševa, Main Town Square, Students' Square), Beautiful Cetinje (first energy-efficiency project in Montenegro), reconstruction of the City Market, valorisation of Lipa Cave, renovation of the first hospital building in Montenegro, building a completely new utilities system, construction of a new main road at the entrance to the town, the largest fine arts university complex in the region etc. During the past period, Cetinje became first Montenegrin city which is covered by the free wi-fi signal.

=== Promotion ===
To promote Cetinje as not only cultural and artist capital of Montenegro but the whole region too, during 2012 and 2013 the city government organized events in which participated globally famous artists such as Pierce Brosnan, Marina Abramović, Gerard Depardieu, Nicholas Lyndhurst and Rem Koolhaas, who were guests of Cetinje during that period.

The most significant project for the future is a cable-car from Kotor to Cetinje, and tender was launched in August 2016.

== Transport ==
Cetinje is connected to Podgorica and Budva through three-lane motorways. Both towns are about 30 km (19 mi) away from Cetinje. Another road to Podgorica is built on the coast of Skadar lake.

There is also a historic old road from Cetinje to Kotor, which is not of premium quality, but which overlooks the Bay of Kotor. As of Spring 2018, this was being upgraded.

Previously there was a railway line from Cetinje to Bar along the banks of Lake Skadar, which transported both passengers and cargo. There are no remains of this railway line.

Tivat Airport is 50 km (31 mi) away, and there are regular flights to Belgrade and Zürich, and dozens of charter planes land daily at Tivat airport during the summer season.

Podgorica Airport is 38 km (24 mi) away, and it has regular flights to major European destinations throughout the year.

== Culture ==
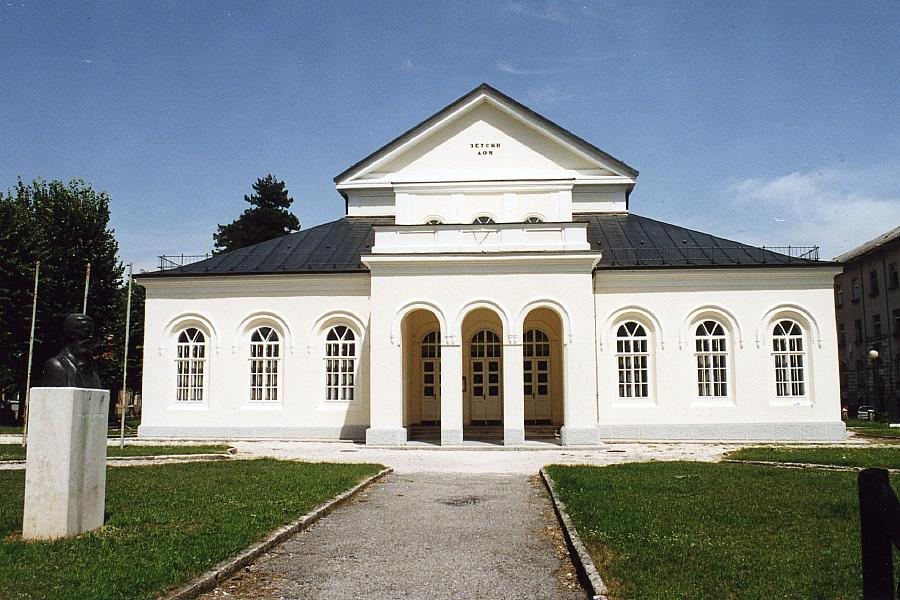
"Zetski Dom" Theatre

Cetinje has been the cultural and educational centre of Montenegro for five centuries. There are five republic institutions: Đurđe Crnojević Central National Library, the National Museum of Montenegro, the Archives of Montenegro, the Republic Institute for Preserving Cultural Heritage and the Zetski Dom Montenegrin Royal National Theatre. All these institutions keep, process, and provide public access to enormous literary treasure, and protect both mobile and immobile cultural monuments throughout Montenegro. The oldest – and for a long time the most important – cultural institution in the town is the monastery of Cetinje. Cetinje is recognized as a "Design City" by UNESCO's Creative Cities Network.

=== Architecture and urban heritage ===
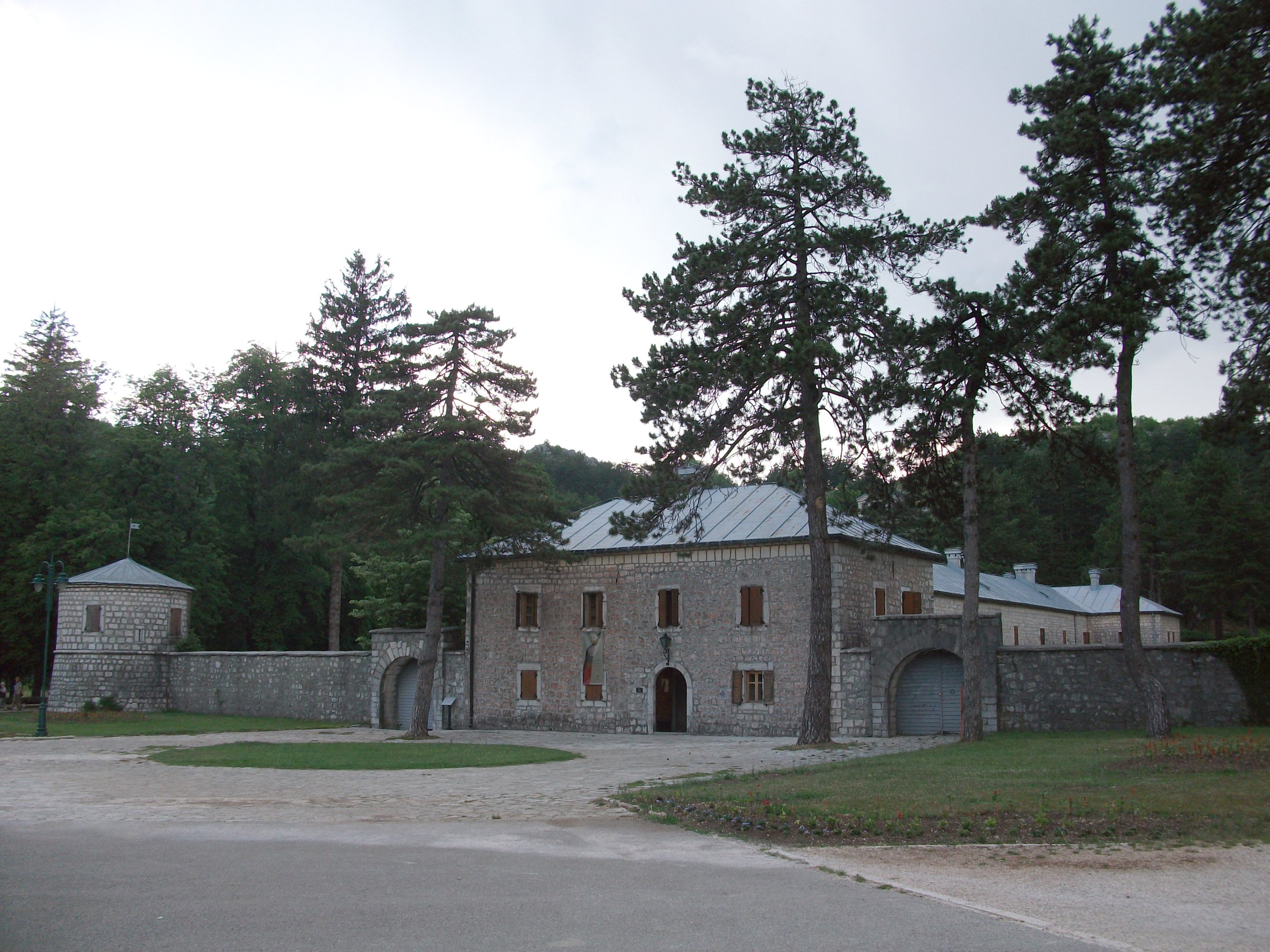
Biljarda – Museum of Petar II Petrović-Njegoš

The onset and development of Cetinje, as a relatively young city, with its old historical core draws a lot of attention to urban and architectural heritage, on its construction and development influenced stormy historical, social and economic events in the country.

Cetinje as a settlement has existed for 500 years, which is a relatively short period of time compared to the development of the coastal agglomeration of the ancient period in the immediate surroundings. However, these five centuries comprise the whole history of a people, who, through the development of city recorded moments of their origin, ascent, stagnation and downs.

Cetinje as an urban agglomeration can be said to have formed suddenly, which makes it very specific. In fact, since the 1870s, for almost fifty years, there was, in the urban context, designed and typological characteristic areas formed with urban-type residential home ground floors and multi-storey houses with developed attics, created and developed in closed urban blocks, in a street – house – garden layout.

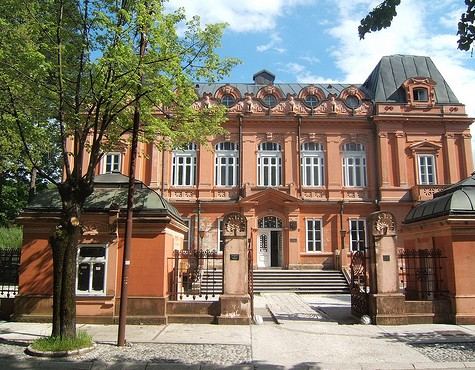
Former Russian embassy in Cetinje

Along with the development of this type of urban city blocks and residential buildings, the city has developed substantial public architecture, which was built under the influence of foreign builders with the application of various architectural styles, and which then and now is a representative architectural backbone of the city.

Between the two world wars, characterized by the loss of Montenegrin statehood and noticeable stagnation of the architectural development of the city, Cetinje continues the tradition of formed, then already traditional type of urban residential houses and closed urban blocks, but they built the first modern multi-storey residential buildings for collective housing, and modern public institutions necessary for the then social life.

In the fastest and most important period of the development of Cetinje, since the 1870s until the First World War, which was then the smallest European old capital, was created and developed city on the principles the European metropolises of that time in whose architectural activity of the city was engaged many foreign architects, engineers, builders and craftsmen.

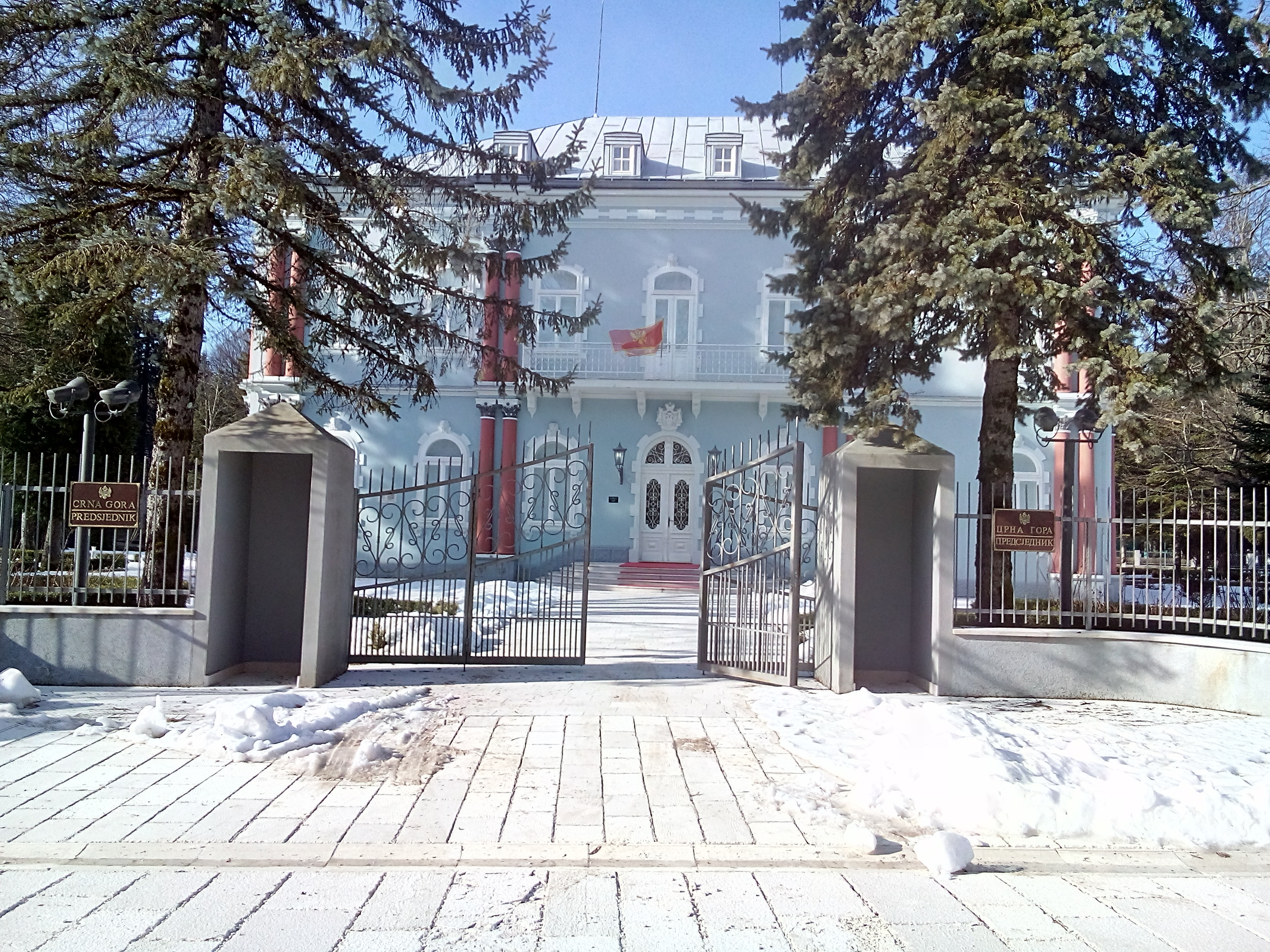
The Blue Palace, where the president of Montenegro resides.

The development of Cetinje in this period was followed by many important historical and social events. So the second half of the nineteenth century in the development of Cetinje marked a period of state power and its pursuit of European culture and international recognition. The recognition of Montenegro as an independent state, at the Berlin Congress in 1878, on the basis of which it greatly expanded, began a period of rapid creation of a national, economic, social, cultural, societal and spatial superstructure which caused an increase of economic power and the reorganization and improvement of the state apparatus and the authorities. During this period, Cetinje, as the old royal capital, gained even greater national and international significance and experienced rapid socio–economic, institutional, and urban development.

Cetinje occupies an important place in the social and urban transformation of other cities in Montenegro between the second half of the nineteenth century and the First World War. Due to its relatively good state of preservation, Cetinje has been recognised for its significant architectural heritage.

=== Printing houses in Cetinje ===
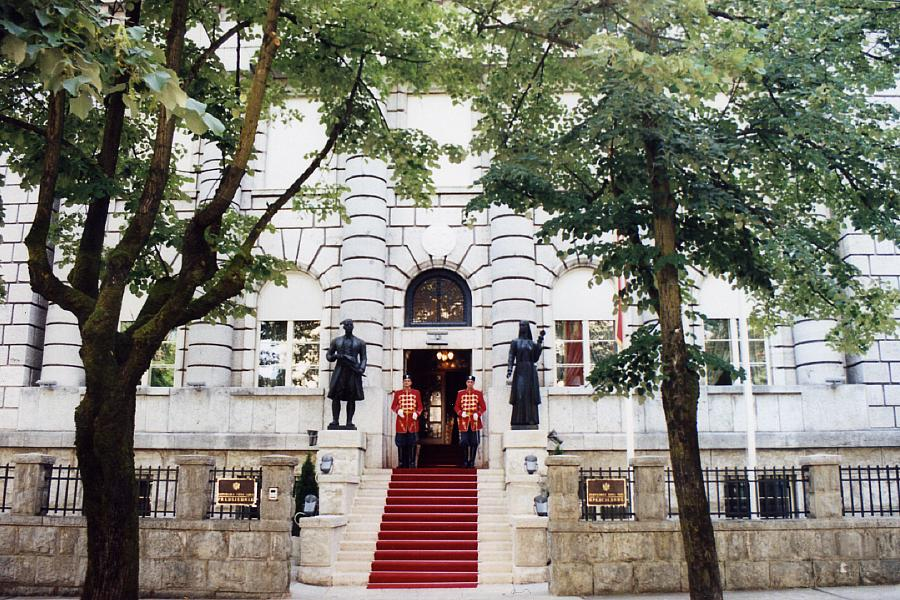
Montenegro Ministry of culture

Cetinje has a rich publishing and printing tradition. The Printing House of Crnojevići (1492–1496) and the books published there are of great importance for Montenegrin culture and history as well as for the culture of other Orthodox peoples of Southeastern Europe. Its greatest contribution refers to spreading Cyrillic type. Thus, it represents an important link in a chain of world culture. There were a number of printing houses that continued this great printing tradition. These are: Njegoš Printing House, which operated between 1833 and 1839 and the State Printing House which was founded in 1858. It was renamed in 1952. Since then it has been known as Obod.

Since their foundation to the present day, Cetinje printing houses have published over 3,000 books, a major contribution to the Montenegrin cultural heritage. The first Montenegrin literary and scientific annual, Grlica (Turtledove), was published in 1835, while the first Montenegrin newspaper, 'The Montenegrin', was established in 1871. Since then, sixty different newspapers and over thirty magazines have been published. In 1914, as a town of fewer than 6,000 inhabitants, Cetinje supported six different daily newspapers.

=== Libraries ===
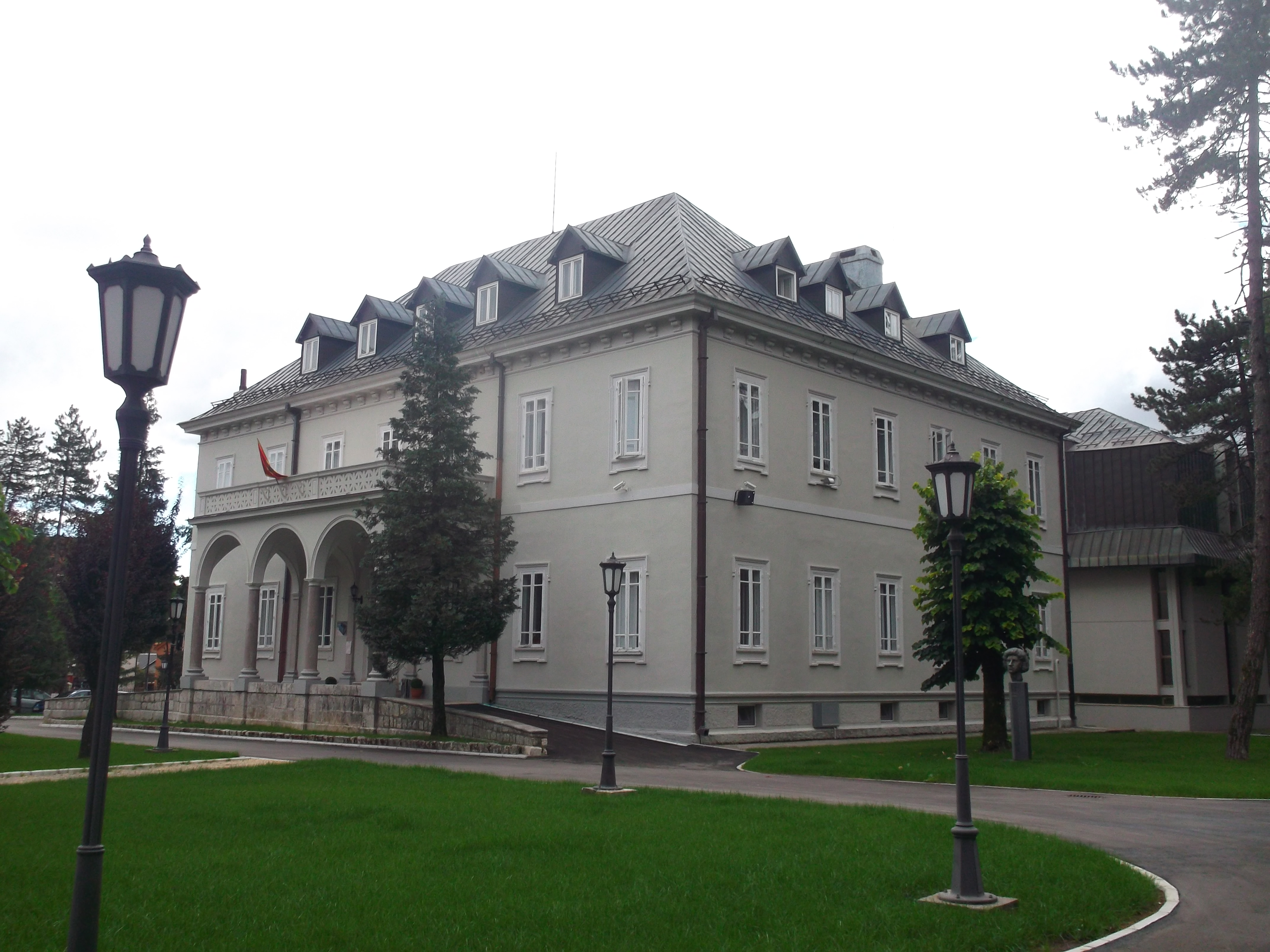
National Library of Montenegro

The oldest libraries of Montenegro, where the oldest books and documentation of great value are preserved, are located at Cetinje. This makes Cetinje internationally recognized as well. The oldest library among these is the Library of Cetinje Monastery, which was founded by the end of the 15th century at the time when the Printing House of Crnojevići started operating. Today, seventy-five old manuscripts written in Cyrillic, then four incunabula, and many old liturgical books are kept there.

The first public reading room in Montenegro known as The Reading Room of Cetinje was founded in 1896. Since its founding it has been the cultural centre of Montenegro. The fruitful activity of this reading room was continued by the Town Library and the Njegoš reading room, which offers over 63,000 books and volumes of periodicals.

The school libraries of Cetinje also have a long tradition. The library of the oldest school at Cetinje today known as Njegoš Elementary School dates back to 1834, the library of the clerical college and the Carica Marija Girls' Institute dates back to 1869, and the library of the Cetinje Gymnasium to 1880.

=== Museums ===
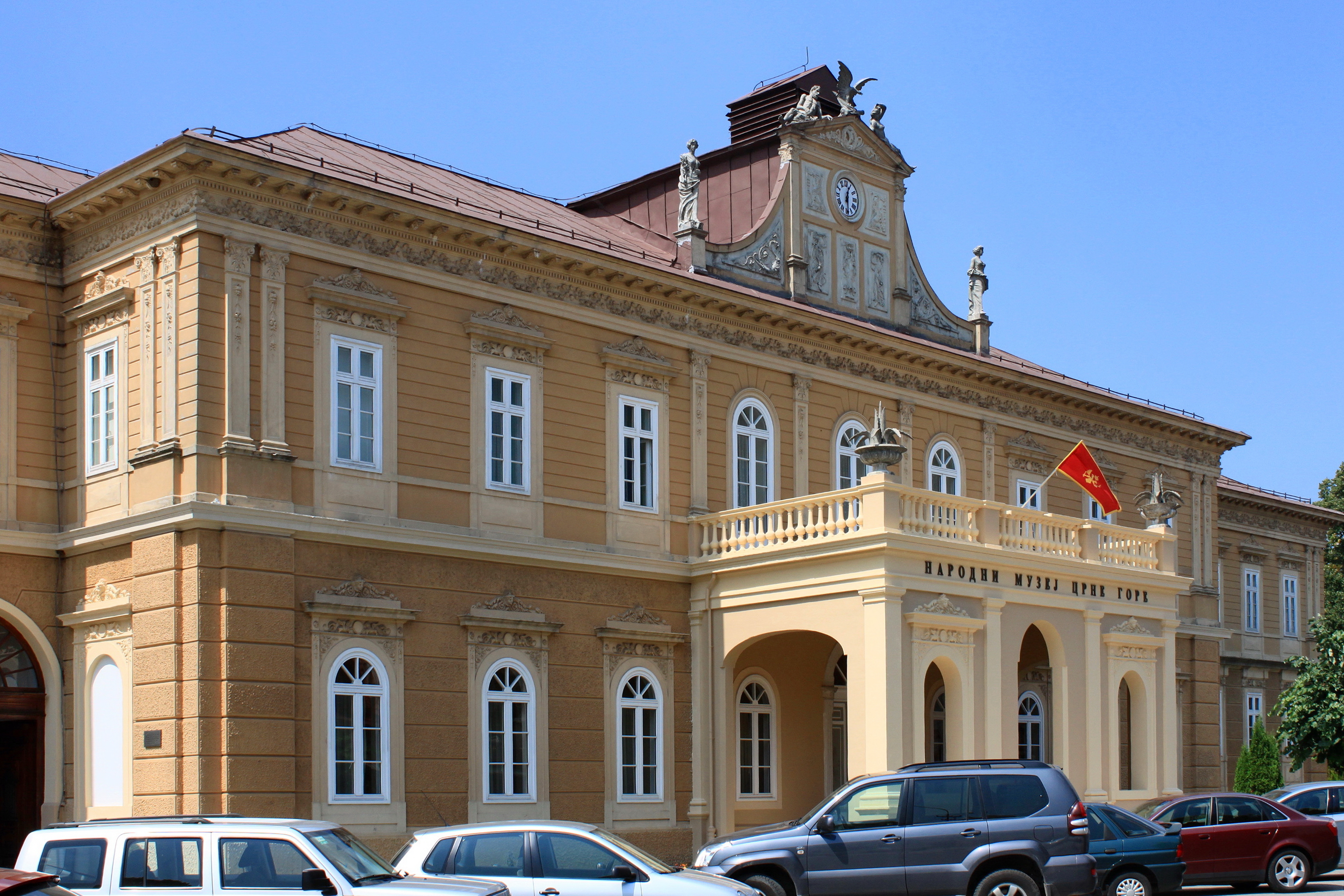
Art Museum and Historical Museum.

Museums in Cetinje include:

- Museum of the Cetinje Monastery
- State Museum
- "Petar Petrovic Njegoš" Museum
- Ethnographic Museum
- Electric Industry Museum
- History Museum
- Art Museum
- Money Museum

All these except the Museum of the Cetinje Monastery, the Money Museum and Electric Industry Museum are integrated in one institution called the National Museum of Montenegro. Numerous museums and the huge fund of museum items that are kept there established Cetinje's reputation as a museum town.

Cetinje has always been a cultural centre. Every second year the international art exhibition called Cetinje Biennial is held there. Its founder is Prince Nikola Petrović, great-grandson to King Nikola I.

=== Main sights ===
Cetinje has a number of attractions, including Cetinje Monastery, Vlaška church (built in 1450, with its fence made out of barrels of captured enemy rifles), Biljarda, several museums, Zetski dom royal theatre and historic foreign embassies. Many of the old embassies and other administrative buildings are now schools of various kinds, and the town has many young people.

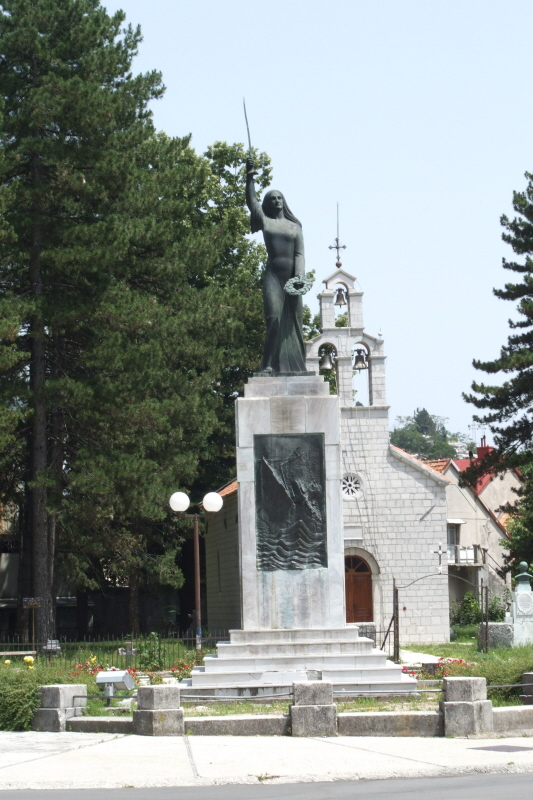
Vlaška Church

Close to Cetinje (about 5 km (3.1 mi)) the Lipa cave (Lipska pecina) is situated, one of the biggest caves in the former Yugoslavia. Its entrance is located in the village of Lipa and it ends in the mountains directly over the Adriatic Sea. After project of Municipality of Cetinje and company 'Lipa Cave', the cave is restored and opened for public in July 2015. Today the cave is one of the biggest tourist attractions in Cetinje and Montenegro, similar to Postojna Cave in Slovenia.

One of the most visited destinations of Cetinje is the mausoleum of Petar II Petrović-Njegoš on the mountain Lovćen. The mausoleum is accessible by car from Cetinje, which is 13 km (8.1 mi) away. Apart from the surrounding natural environment of beech, oak and linden tree forests, there is a unique freshness of Lovćen national park. The mausoleum is situated at the Jezerski vrh (Jezerski peak), in the height of 1,660 m (5,450 ft), and it officially represents the highest mausoleum in the world.

In the past few years there has been a plan of enlisting the old historic core of the city of Cetinje as a UNESCO world heritage site. With this, Cetinje hopes to rebuild and restore the old historic core and the façades of its buildings. Cetinje is becoming more and more popular with tourists so the locals started painting their houses in vivid colors, the local government started quite a number of projects to restore the buildings, the markets and façades of the city of Cetinje.

=== Religion ===
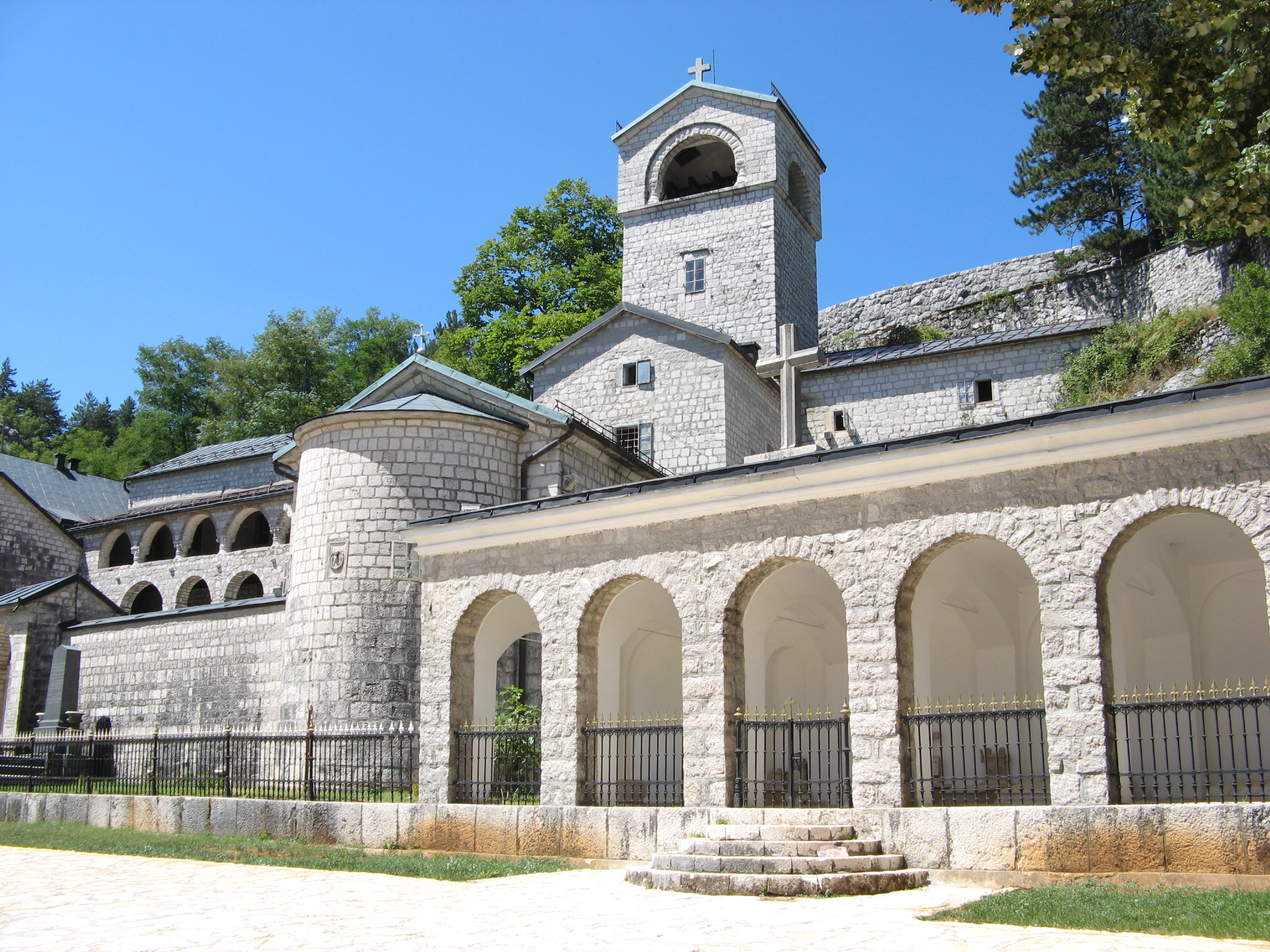
Cetinje Monastery.

Cetinje is also the seat of the Eparchy of Montenegro and the Littoral of the Serbian Orthodox Church, and Montenegrin Orthodox Church.

Seat of the Eparchy of Montenegro and the Littoral is situated in Cetinje Monastery. Seat of the Montenegrin Orthodox Church is situated in the Chapel in Gruda quarter.

=== Festivals ===
Today, Cetinje is home of one of the most popular cultural events in Montenegro – 'Summer at the Old Royal Capital'. It is the artist festival with almost 100 events, which held yearly, from June to September. During that period, visitors can attend the gigs of regional artist stars at the most significant city locations, but in the villages too. During the 'Summer at the Old Royal Capital', there are festivals like 'Royal Fest' (hard rock, alternative), 'Cetinje Jazz Fest', 'Espressivo' (classical music), 'Cucka jeka' (Kobilji Do), 'Riječka noć' (Rijeka Crnojevića), 'Njeguško ljeto' (Lovćen and Njeguši), 'Folklor' etc. Events during the 'Summer at the Old Royal Capital' attend about 50,000 visitors.

There are more festivals and events during the whole year, like 'Christmas Concerts' (7/8 January), Independence Day event (21 May), 'MIT Fest' (alternative theatre festival) etc.

== Sport ==
The most popular sports in Cetinje are football, handball and basketball.

=== Football ===
Football in Cetinje has a very long tradition associated with FK Lovćen Cetinje, oldest football club in Montenegro. FK Lovćen was founded on 20 June 1913. It is one of the most successful football clubs in Montenegro.

The best results in the past were achieved before WW2, when they won few Montenegrin Championships, and in 1956 in qualifications for the first national league. In 1947, Lovćen was juvenile club champion. FK Lovćen now competes in the Montenegrin Second League. During the season 2013/14, Lovćen won second place. On 21 May 2014, Lovćen won the Montenegrin Cup, which was the first national trophy in the club's history.

Another club from Cetinje is FK Cetinje, formed in 1975. They play in the Montenegrin Third League and share the Stadion Sveti Petar Cetinjski with Lovćen.

=== Handball ===
Formed at 1949, Handball club "Lovćen" is among oldest handball clubs in Montenegro. During the decades, especially from 80's until today, Lovćen became most successful Montenegrin men's handball club, but the most trophied team from Old Royal Capital Cetinje. There is huge number of great Montenegrin, Yugoslav and European players which produced handball school of Lovćen.

From the 1988 until today, Lovćen played 23 seasons in the First Handball League of SFR Yugoslavia, FR Yugoslavia and Montenegro. Five times, club from Cetinje won the champions' title – in the seasons 1999/00, 2000/01, 2006/07, 2011/12 and 2012/13.

Most trophies in the club history, Lovćen won in the national Cup. Club from Cetinje holds 2 winner titles in the Cup of FR Yugoslavia and five in the Montenegrin Cup. Lovćen hold Cup trophies from the seasons 2001/02, 2002/03, 2008/09, 2009/10, 2010/11, 2011/12, 2012/13.

Lovćen is member of Regional SEHA League since its inception. Today, Lovćen is the only SEHA League member from Montenegro. In their first SEHA League season, Lovćen made surprising result, with final placement on 6th position. Year after that, Lovćen finished season on the same table position. In the season 2013/14, because of new SEHA League criteria, SRC Lovćen hall was reconstructed, with changing capacity from 1,500 to 2,020.

Handball club Lovćen is permanent member of European handball competitions since 1997. The greatest result Lovćen made during the EHF Champions League 2000/01 when they participated in the quarterfinals against THW Kiel. Until today, Lovćen played 65 games in European Competitions.

"B" team of Lovćen is HC Cepelin-Lovćen, which in past competed in First league. Today, Cepelin-Lovćen is playing in Second league.

=== Basketball ===
Basketball club Lovćen is one of the oldest sport clubs in Cetinje. It was founded in 1947. The best results were achieved in 1997/98 season, when it was scored at the 6th place of the National basketball league. This provided participation at international competition "Radivoje Korac Cup." Today, it competes in the first A league of Montenegro. Second club is BC Cetinje, formed in 1997.

=== Other sports ===
During the past, in Cetinje existed Volleyball club "Lovćen". It competed in Republic League and was among best Montenegrin clubs in that sport. VC "Lovćen" is not active anymore.

Today, there are dozens of active clubs. Table-tennis club "Lovćen" is among two most successful table tennis clubs in Montenegro during last four decades. Other clubs are Racing team "Lovćen", Judo club "Crnogorac", Karate club "Lovćen", Boxing club "Lovćen", Women basketball club "Lovćen" and others.

=== Venues ===
Cetinje has a number of sporting venues. The main sporting venues on Cetinje are:

- Stadion Sveti Petar Cetinjski, with capacity of 5,192 seats.
- Sports Center Cetinje, a multi functional indoor sport facility. It has a capacity of 2,020 seats.
- New small football field of FK Lovćen, with capacity of 1,000 seats with lights for night games.

== Notable people ==
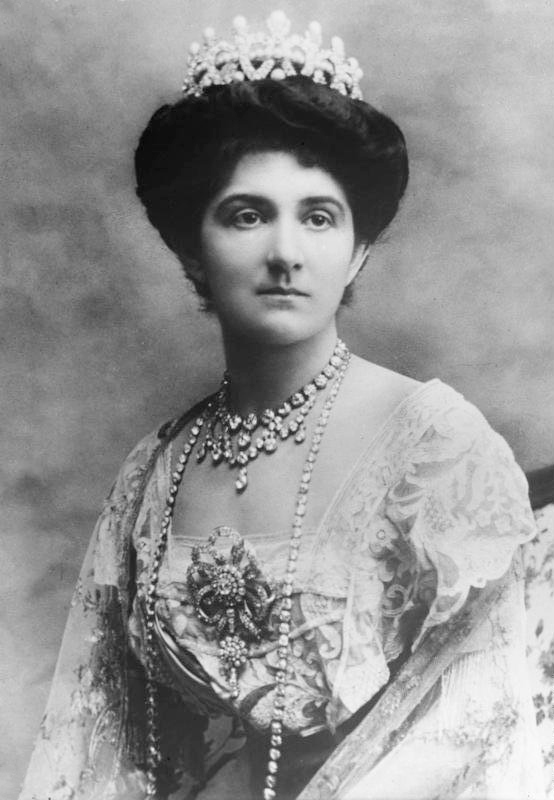
Elena of Montenegro

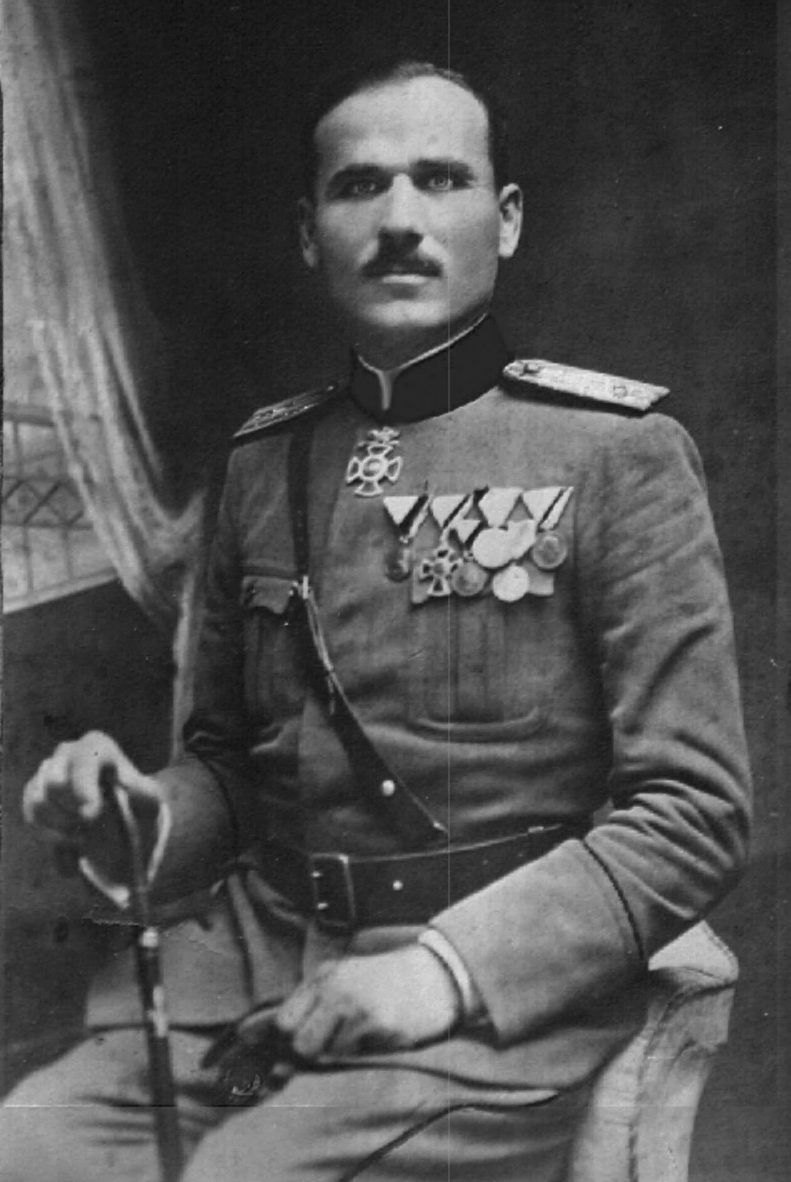
Krsto Zrnov Popović

- Ivan Crnojević – Lord of Zeta and the founder of Cetinje
- Đurađ Crnojević – last Montenegrin medieval Lord of Zeta
- Arsenije III Crnojević, Patriarch of Peć
- Danilo I Petrović-Njegoš – Metropolitan of Cetinje and the founder of the House of Petrović-Njegoš
- Sava Petrović – Prince-Bishopric of Montenegro
- Arsenije Plamenac – Metropolitan of Cetinje
- Petar I Petrović-Njegoš – Prince-Bishopric of Montenegro
- Petar II Petrović-Njegoš – Prince-Bishop of Montenegro, poet and philosopher
- Prince Danilo I – Prince of Montenegro
- Nikola I Petrović-Njegoš – King of Montenegro
- Milena of Montenegro – Queen of Montenegro
- Elena of Montenegro, Queen of Italy
- Princess Milica of Montenegro
- Princess Anastasia of Montenegro
- Danilo II, Crown Prince of Montenegro
- Princess Anna of Montenegro
- Prince Mirko of Montenegro
- Princess Zorka of Montenegro
- Princess Xenia of Montenegro
- Princess Vjera of Montenegro
- Mirko Petrović-Njegoš – was a Montenegrin military commander, politician and poet
- Krsto Zrnov Popović, officer of the Montenegrin Army
- George, Crown Prince of Serbia
- Alexander I of Yugoslavia
- Branko Kostić – Yugoslav politician, businessman, university professor
- Dado, painter
- Petar Lubarda, painter
- Milo Milunović, painter
- Dimitrije Popović, painter, sculptor, philosopher
- Miloš Vušković, painter, illustrator and caricaturist
- Dragoljub Đuričić, percussionist
- Žarko Laušević, actor
- Frédéric Rossif – French film and television director
- Slavko Perović, politician
- Miodrag Perunović, boxer, European amateur champion
- Goran Vujević, Yugoslav volleyball player and Olympic champion
- Milutin Pajević, former football player and manager
- Nikola Jovanović, former football player
- Mirko Stojanović, former football player
- Balša Sekulić, football player
- Veselin Vujović, former handball player
- Vuko Borozan, handball player, National Team Montenegro, Vardar
- Veselin Vujović, former handball player, Olympic and World champion, IHF World Player of the Year
- Veljko Uskoković, water polo player, Olympic bronze medalist and European champion
- Žarko Marković, handball player
- Draško Mrvaljević, handball player
- Aleksandar Bogdanović – politician
- Petar Kapisoda, handball player
- Filip Kapisoda, male model and celebrity
- Milica Dabović, basketball player, Olympic bronze medalist and European champion
- Miloš Karadaglić – classical guitarist
- Ana Dabović, basketball player, Olympic bronze medalist and European champion
- Miloš Nikić, volleyball player and European champion
- Danka Kovinić – tennis player
- Marija Vuković – athlete specializing in the high jump

== Twin towns – sister cities ==
Cetinje is twinned with:

- Alba Iulia, Romania
- Gaeta, Italy
- (Turkey) Gaziantep, turkey
- Dijon, France
- Dubrovnik, Croatia
- Kharkiv, Ukraine
- Kostroma, Russia
- Larnaca, Cyprus
- Mali Iđoš, Serbia
- Maribor, Slovenia
- Nafplio, Greece
- Novo Sarajevo (Sarajevo), Bosnia and Herzegovina
- Nürnberg, Germany
- Rijeka, Croatia
- Santa Severina, Italy
- Shkodër, Albania
- Sinaia, Romania
- Split, Croatia
- Spoleto, Italy
- Velika Kladuša, Bosnia and Herzegovina
- Veliko Tarnovo, Bulgaria
- Visegrád, Hungary
- Vranje, Serbia
- West Achaea, Greece
- Siena, Italy

== See also ==
- List of former national capitals
