= Cetinje Royal Palace =

Building in Cetinje, Montenegro

Coordinates: 42°23′15″N 18°55′28″E

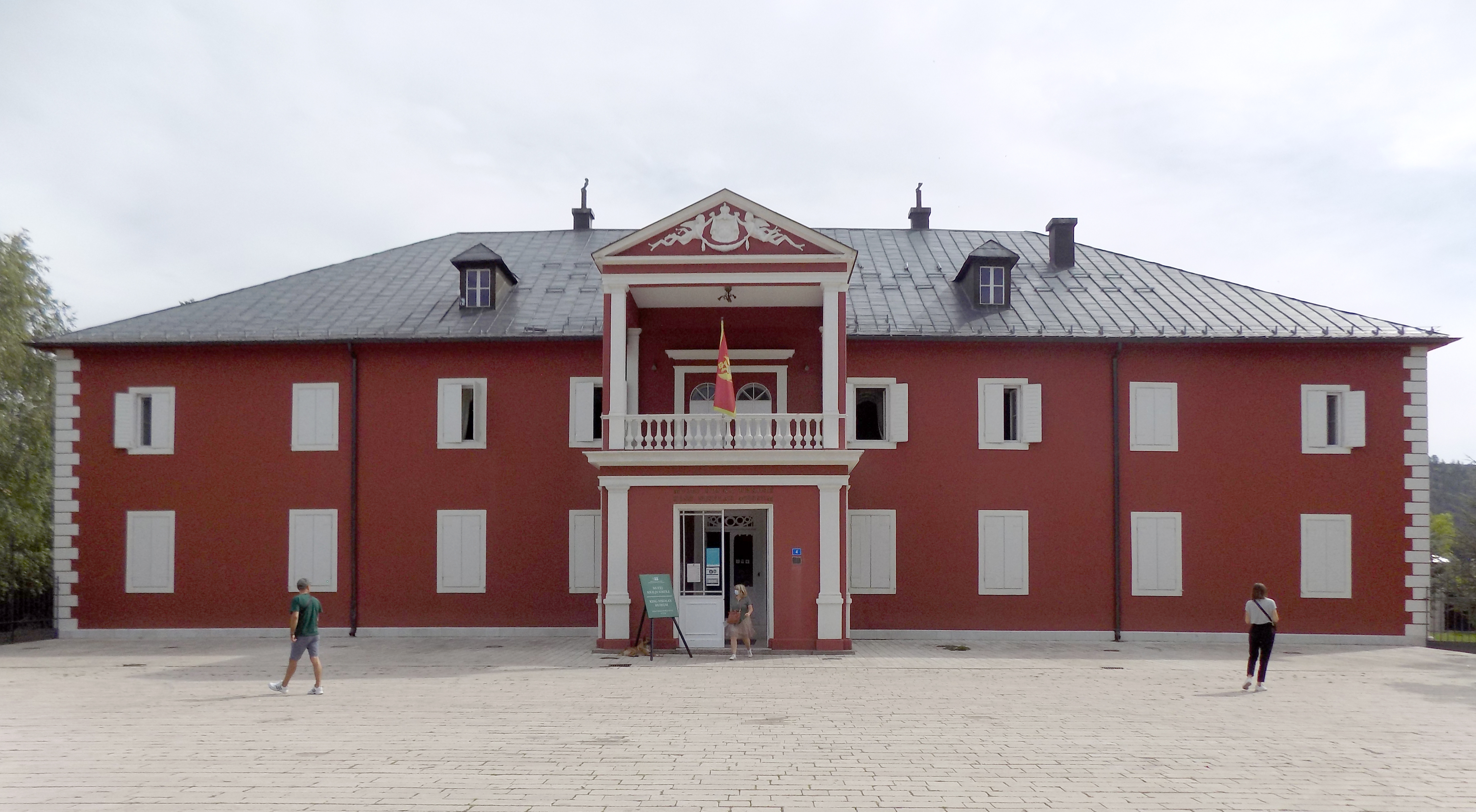
- Cetinje Royal Palace
- Interactive map of the Cetinje Royal Palace area

General information
- Architectural style: Neoclassicism
- Location: Cetinje, Montenegro
- Construction started: 1863
- Completed: 1867

The Cetinje Royal Palace (Serbian: Краљевски двор Цетиње) is located in Cetinje, Montenegro, and for more than 50 years served as the seat of the Montenegrin Royal family. In 1926, it became a museum and from 1980, it was one of the departments in the National Museum of Montenegro.

== History ==
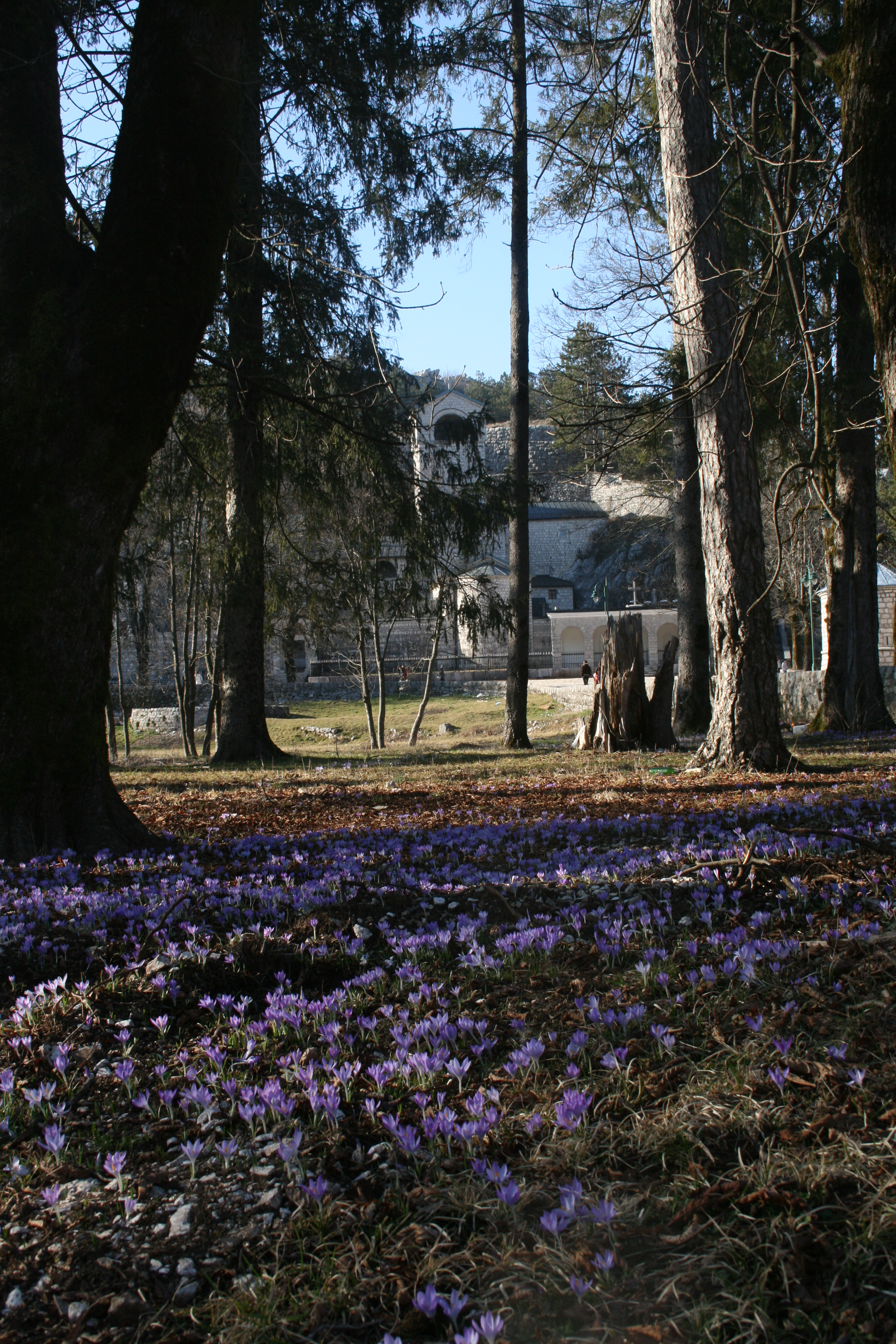
Cetinje Palace Royal garden; view to Cetinje monastery

The small palace was built from 1863 to 1867 as a permanent residence for Darinka, Princess of Montenegro, widow of Danilo I of Montenegro, and their infant daughter, Princess Olga. It was built in a simple style typical of Cetinje houses with certain elements of neoclassicism. The interiors were designed in style of Historicism and Art Nouveau. Architects and engineers alternate - the Austrian Wolfgang Pakler, the Italian E. Sale, Marko Đukanović and Andrija Radović (the first Montenegrin architects).

According to a report by the Russian consul in Dubrovnik, the construction of their palace was quite costly (up to that point 110,000 Austrian guldens), and to satisfy their whims, its completion was financed with funds from grain aid Russia had sent to Montenegro, later sold by Prince Nicholas and his father Mirko.

After their exile from Montenegro to Venice in 1867, the palace became home of King Nicholas I, his wife Queen Milena and their growing family.

After Darinka's exile from Montenegro to Venice in 1867, the palace became home of her nephew, Nicholas I of Montenegro, his wife Milena of Montenegro and their growing family. The court was partially redecorated and extended on several occasions, and the final adaptation took place in 1910 for the proclamation of the Kingdom of Montenegro with the architect Fernando Balak.

In the entrance hall are exposed the Montenegrin crown jewels, which are the most popular exhibition of the National Museum of Montenegro.

The Royal Garden was built in 1870 as a pine alley. The Gardens were refurbished in 1971. There are many flower beds with crocuses, geraniums, tulips and rose and jasmine bushes.

In the back of garden there is a cedar grove with dominant villa with a small summer-house, which served as a guest house for foreign royal visitors.

== See also ==
- Petrović-Njegoš dynasty
