= National Museum of Montenegro =

Museum in Cetinje, Montenegro

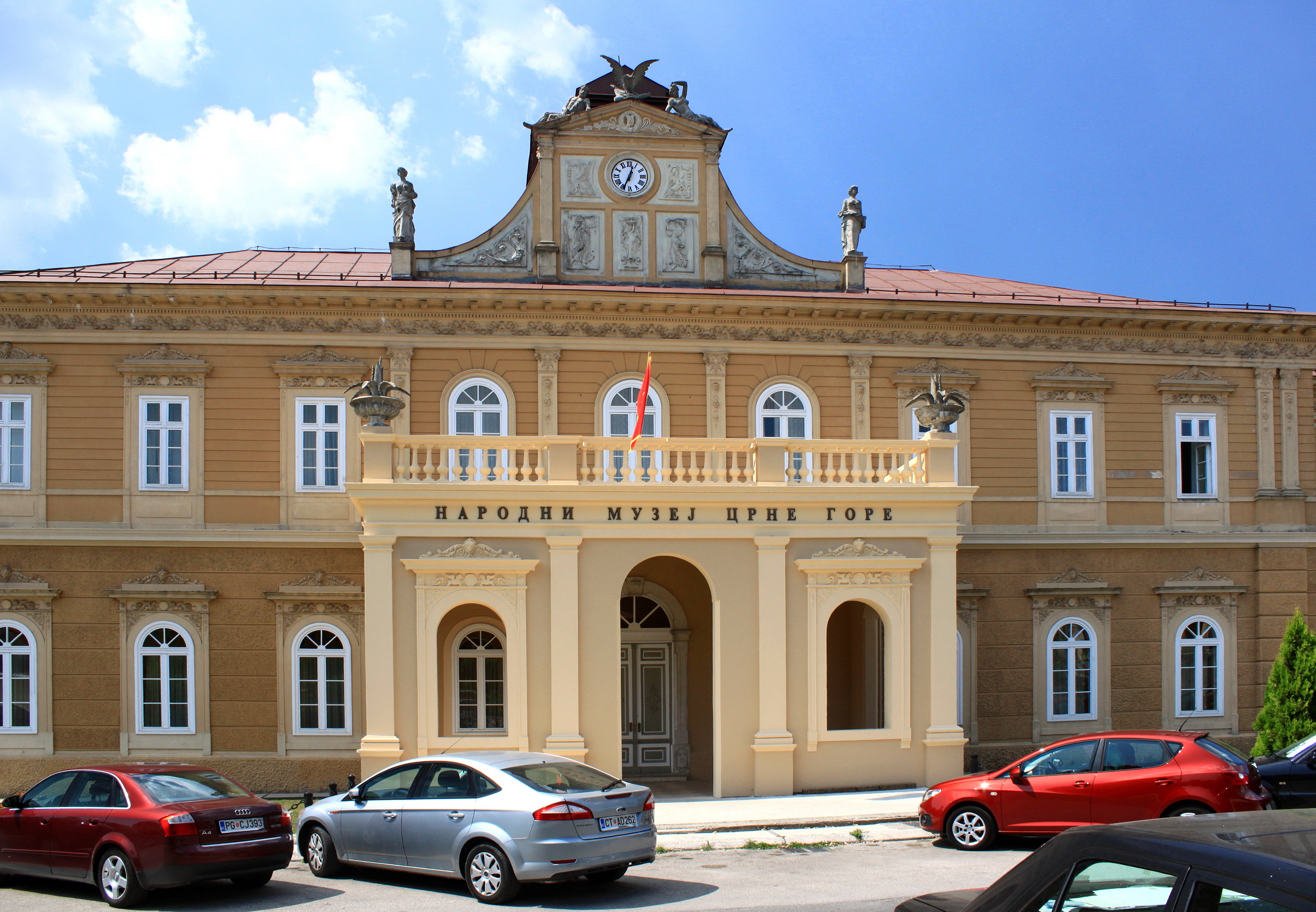
- Location: Cetinje, Old Royal Capital Cetinje, Montenegro
- Website: Official website

The National Museum of Montenegro (Montenegrin: Народни музеј Црне Горе, romanized: Narodni muzej Crne Gore) is the largest museum in Montenegro. The museum was established in 1896 and is located in Cetinje, Montenegro.

== Departments ==
The museum is divided into five departments:

- Historical Museum of Montenegro
- Ethnographic Museum of Montenegro
- Artistic Museum of Montenegro
- King Nikola's Palace
- Biljarda, Museum of Petar II Petrović Njegoš

== Possessions ==
The museum possesses the Oktoih Prvoglasnik, a significant printed work from the late 15th century. It also host the original icon of Our Lady of Philermos, which had been in the possession of the Order of St. John since the Crusades.

More precise documentation in the museum has been maintained since 1976.

Around 3000 artifacts owned by the museum cannot be located and they are presumed to have been stolen over the years.

== Bibliography ==
- de Giorgio, Cynthia (2007). St John's Co-Cathedral – Valletta. Santa Venera: Heritage Books (a subsidiary of Midsea Books Ltd). ISBN 9789993271710.
