= Milo Milunović =

Montenegrin painter (1897–1967)

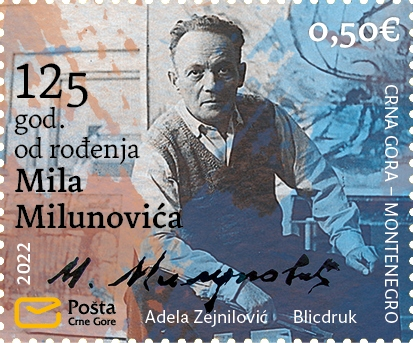
Milunović on a 2022 stamp of Montenegro

Milo Milunović (Cyrillic: Мило Милуновић; Born 6 August 1897 – 11 February 1967) was a Montenegrin painter. He dabbled in both Impressionism and Cubism.

== Biography ==
Milunović was born in Cetinje, Montenegro, but was educated in Shkodër, Monza, Florence (under the apprenticeship of Augusto Giacometti), and later in Paris. He joined the Montenegrin army in World War I, and from 1919 to 1922 lived in Paris, where he became acquainted with the works of Cézanne. He spent 1923 in Prčanj, where he painted frescoes in the local church. From 1924 to 1926 he lived in Zagreb, Paris, and later Belgrade, where with two colleagues he founded the Academy of Arts, Belgrade. He painted his most successful works between 1926 and 1932, most of which were impressionist.

Among his pupils were the painters Danica Đurović and Nikola Gvozdenović Gvozdo.

== Painting ==
His works were characterized by a rationalistic approach, both to composition and space. Anti-illusionistic devices were used in the representation of space. Milunović's art can sometimes be seen as abstract, other times as impressionistic, and even sometimes as Fauvist.
