= List of Montenegrins =

List of Montenegrins is a list of notable people who were Montenegrin by their personal or ancestral ethnicity.

== Architecture ==
- Svetlana Kana Radević

== Literature ==
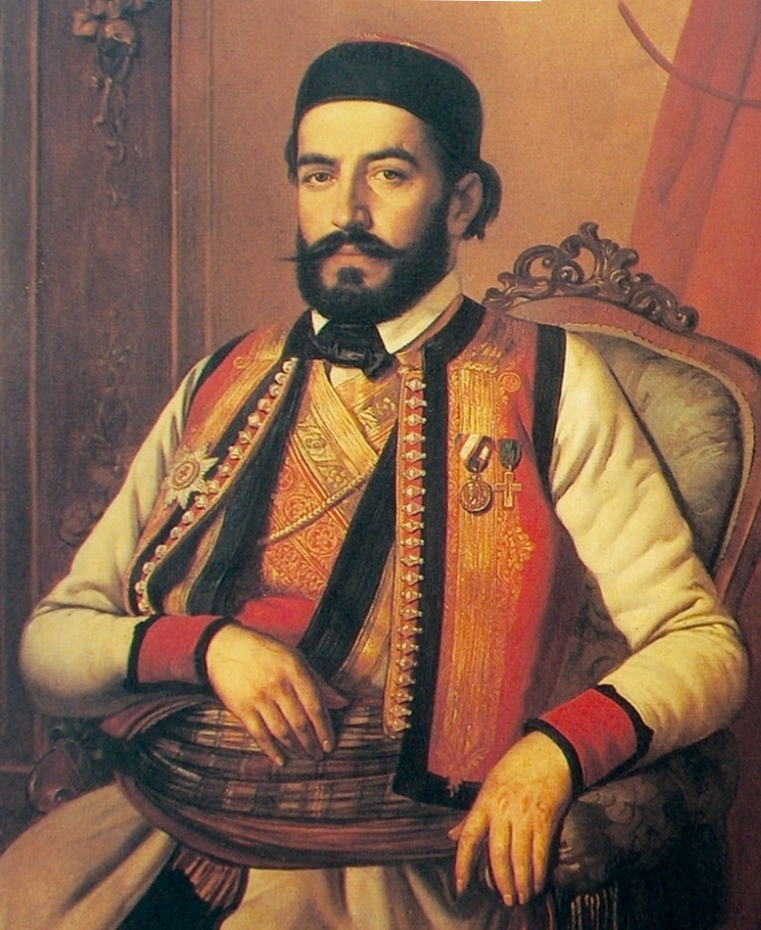
Petar II Petrović-Njegoš

=== Writers ===
- Čedo Vuković
- Mihailo Lalić
- Milisav Popović
- Elijah Monte Radlovic
- Petar II Petrović-Njegoš
- Mirko Kovač
- Radovan Zogović
- Marko Miljanov Popović
- Andrija Paltašić
- Milovan Đilas
- Dejan Stojanović
- Novak Kilibarda
- Dragan Radulović
- Borislav Jovanović
- Sreten Asanović
- Nikola Petanović
- Andrija Paltašić, writer, editor and publisher
- Željko Milović

=== Poets ===
- Tanja Bakić
- Giovanni Bona Boliris (Ivan Bolica or Ivan Bunić)
- Mariano Bolizza
- Aleksandar Bečanović
- Stjepan Mitrov Ljubiša
- Marko Miljanov
- Petar II Petrović Njegoš
- Mirko Petrović-Njegoš
- Vitomir Vito Nikolić
- Ivan Paltašić
- Andrija Radulović
- Lena Ruth Stefanovic
- Dejan Stojanović
- Jovan Sundečić
- Dragana Tripković
- Andrija Zmajević
- Radovan Zogović
- Mirko Banjević

=== Historians ===
- Živko Andrijašević
- Miomir Dašić
- Zoran Lakić
- Šerbo Rastoder
- Radoje Pajović
- Srđa Pavlović
- Draško Šćekić
- Nikola Vukčević

== Journalists ==
- Puniša Perović
- Andrej Nikolaidis
- Dragan Radulović
- Jelena Đurović

=== Chroniclers ===
- Nikola Bošković

== Art ==
=== Painters ===
- Jovan Zonjić
- Miodrag "Dado" Đurić
- Uroš Tošković
- Petar Lubarda
- Milo Milunović
- Andrija Paltašić
- Miloš Vusković
- Gojko Berkuljan
- Vojo Stanić
- Mario Maskareli

=== Sculptors ===
- Vojo Stanić
- Risto Stijović
- Yevgeny Vuchetich

=== Photographers ===
- Rizo Šurla

== Film and theatre ==
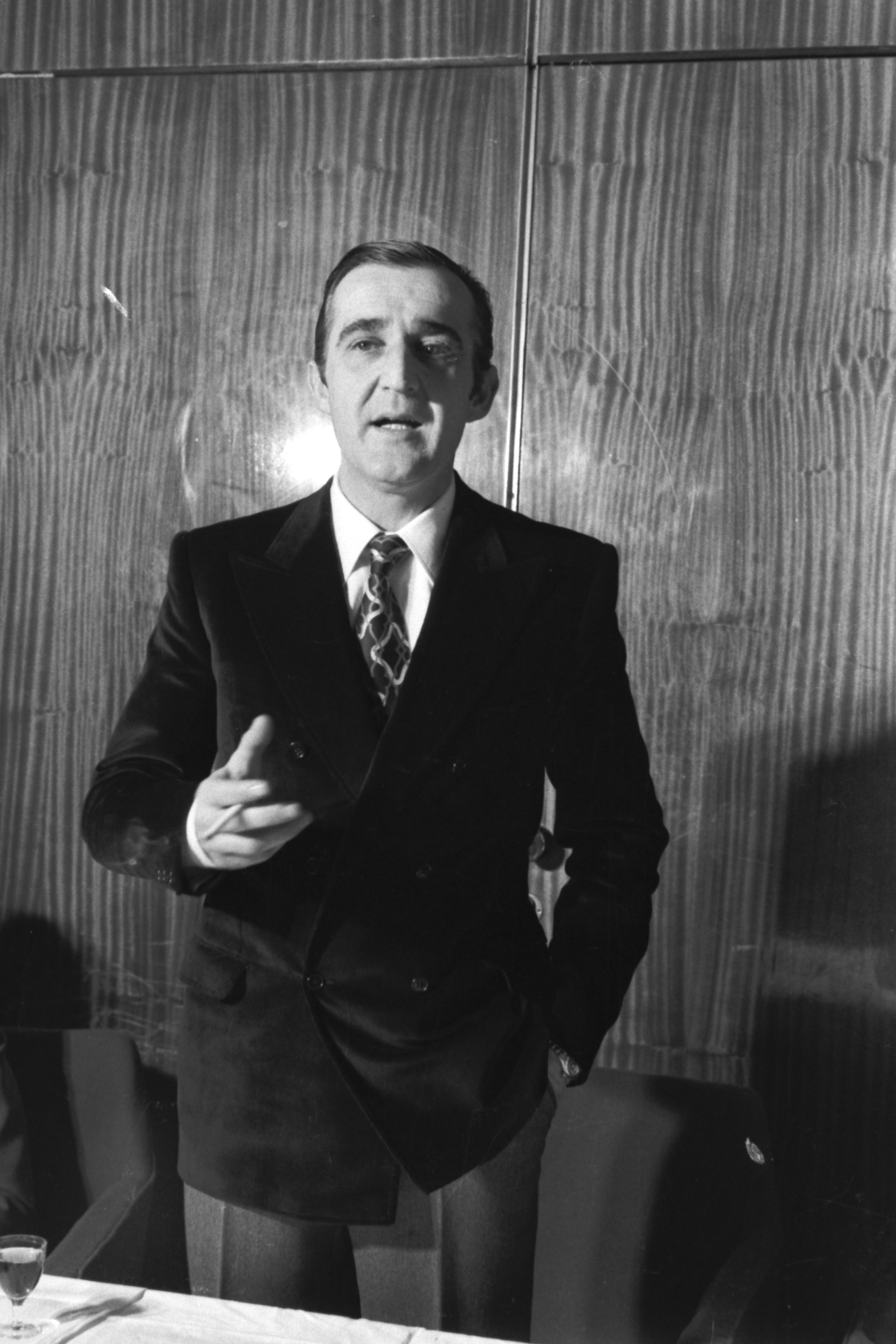
Veljko Bulajić

=== Actors/actresses ===
- Branimir Popović
- Dubravka Vukotić
- Izudin Bajrović
- Momčilo Otašević
- Moamer Kasumović
- Stefan Kapičić
- Milutin Karadžić
- Slavko Labović
- Veljko Mandić
- Vladimir Popović
- Sasha Montenegro

=== Film directors ===
- Živko Nikolić
- Veljko Bulajić
- Ivan Kraljević
- Željko Sošić

=== Cartoonists ===
- Dušan Vukotić

=== Cinematographers ===
- Bojan Bazelli

== Music ==
=== Classical ===
- Miloš Karadaglić
- Nastasja Vojinović
- Janko Nilović
- Ratimir Martinović
- Jovo Ivanišević
- Milivoje Mićo Božović
- Danijel Cerović
- Dušan Obrenović
- Simo Šišević
- Roman Simović

=== Pop ===
- Andrea Demirović
- Knez
- Slavko Kalezić
- Vanja Radovanović
- Vladana Vučinić
- Nina Žižić
- Tamara Živković
- Sergej Ćetković
- Danijel Alibabić
- Marko Prentić
- Bojan Marović
- Bojan Marović
- Stefan Filipović
- Nina Petković
- Stevan Faddy
- Daniel
- Marinko Pavićević

=== Rock ===
- Miladin Šobić
- Dragoljub Đuričić

=== Jazz ===
- Rambo Amadeus

=== Hip-Hop ===
- Noyz
- Niggor
- Senidah
- Dvorska Luda

=== Folk ===
- Božo Vrećo

== Fashion models ==
- Karnela Scekic
- Marija Vujović
- Filip Kapisoda
- Tara Emad

== Military ==
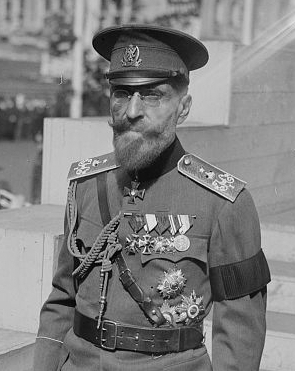
Anto Gvozdenović

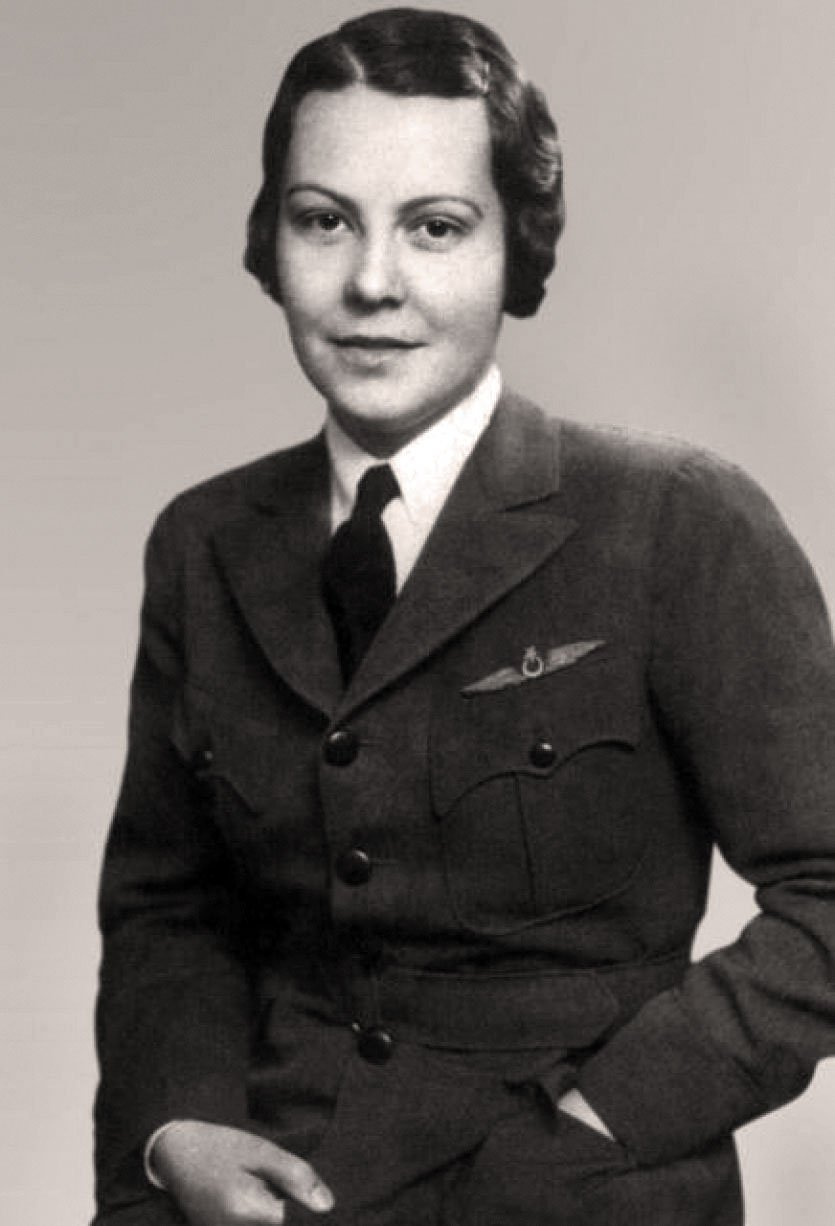
Sabiha Ćorović Gökçen

=== Admirals ===
- Matija Zmajević
- Vladimir Barović

=== Captains ===
- Krsto Zmajević

=== Commanders ===
- Sava Kovačević
- Peko Dapčević
- Vlado Dapčević
- Radola Gajda
- Marko Popović

=== Generals ===
- Anto Gvozdenović
- Krsto Zrnov Popović
- Janko Vukotić
- Veljko Kovačević
- Ivan Milutinović
- Bogdan Vujošević
- Đuro Lončarević

=== Majors ===
- Krsto Zrnov Popović
- Marko Popović

=== Pilots ===
- Sabiha Gökçen

=== Seamen ===
- Matija Zmajević

=== Explorers ===
- Ivan Visin

=== Voivodes ===
- Novica Cerović
- Mirko Petrović-Njegoš
- Marko Miljanov Popović
- Gavro Vuković

=== Others ===
- Vukašin Marković
- Dušan Mugoša
- Miladin Popović
- Novica Radović
- Boro Vukmirović
- Stana Tomašević

== Politicians ==
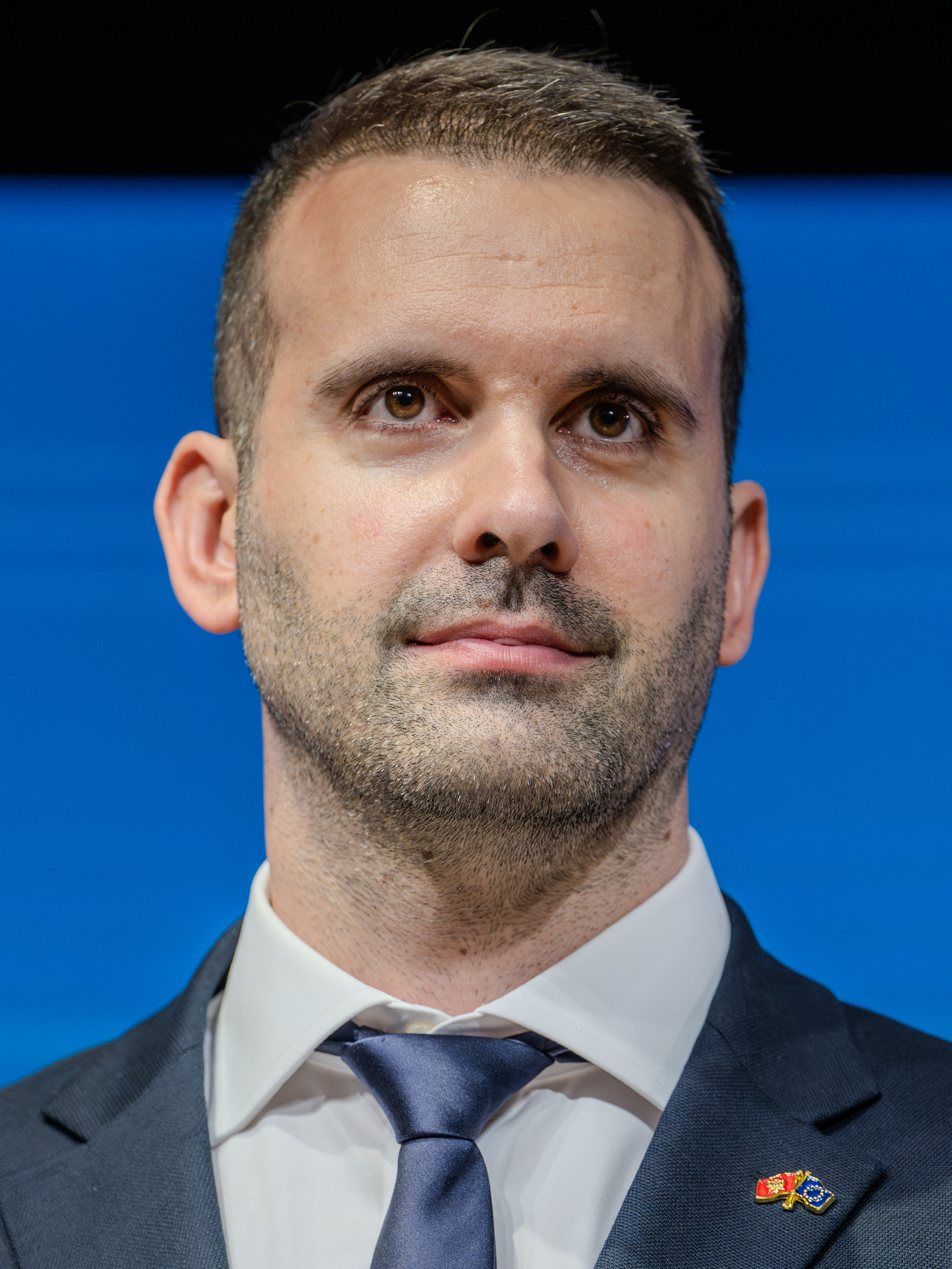
Milojko Spajić

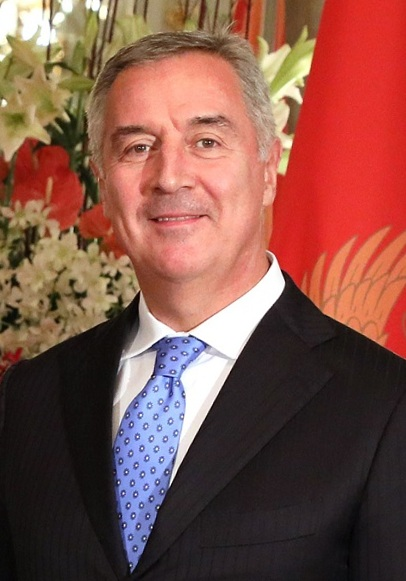
Milo Đukanović

=== Prime Ministers ===
- Milojko Spajić
- Duško Marković
- Igor Lukšić
- Milo Đukanović
- Filip Vujanović
- Jovan Plamenac
- Anto Gvozdenović
- Evgenije Popović
- Lazar Mijušković
- Andrija Radović
- Milutin Vučinić
- Marko Orlandić
- Blažo Jovanović
- Filip Bajković

=== Presidents ===
- Niko Miljanić
- Nikola Kovačević
- Blažo Jovanović
- Filip Bajković
- Veljko Milatović
- Vidoje Žarković
- Veselin Đuranović
- Marko Orlandić
- Miodrag Vlahović
- Branislav Šoškić
- Radivoje Brajović
- Božina Ivanović
- Branko Kostić
- Milo Đukanović
- Filip Vujanović
- Jakov Milatović

=== Other ===
- Aleksandar Bogdanović
- Jorge Capitanich
- Slavko Perović
- Andrija Popović
- Milica Pejanović-Đurišić
- Predrag Bošković
- Nikola Janović
- Dragiša Burzan
- Dragan Đurović
- Draginja Vuksanović
- Ranko Krivokapić
- Ivan Brajović
- Svetozar Vukmanović
- Novak Kilibarda
- Sekula Drljević
- Žarko Bulajić
- Radivoje Brajović
- Momčilo Cemović
- Milovan Djilas
- Veselin Đuranović
- Božina Ivanović
- Jovo Kapičić
- Jovana Marović
- Vidoje Žarković
- Svetozar Vukmanović
- Ratko Vujović
- Veljko Vlahović

== Foreign figures of Montenegrin descent ==
People with Montenegrin ancestry but high-ranked officials of other countries:

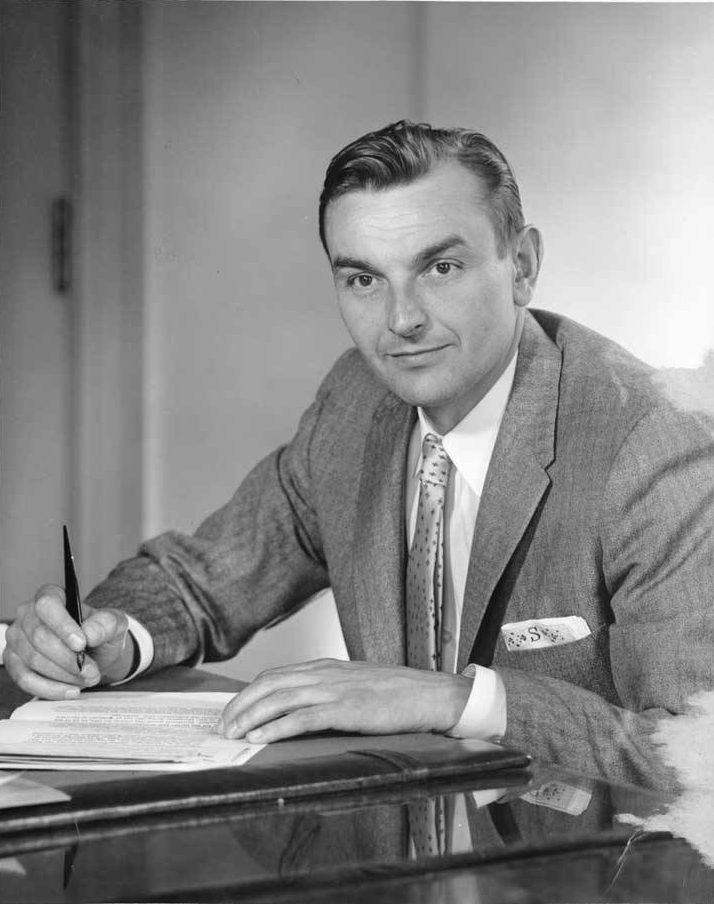
Michael Anthony Stepovich

- Jorge Milton Capitanich, Argentinian Senator
- Michael Anthony Stepovich, Governor of Alaska
- Melissa Bean Luburic, Democratic Party representative in the United States of America House of Representatives
- Mark Brnovich, Attorney General of Arizona
- Oliver Vujović, Secretary General SEEMO; Austria

=== Senators ===
- Novica Cerović

== Businesspeople ==
- Aco Đukanović
- Duško Knežević
- Vitalik Buterin
- Samih Sawiris
- Slobodan Šaranović

== Royalty ==
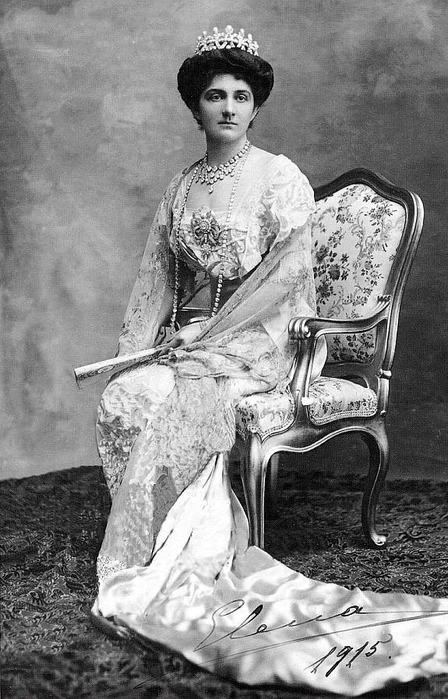
Queen Elena of Montenegro

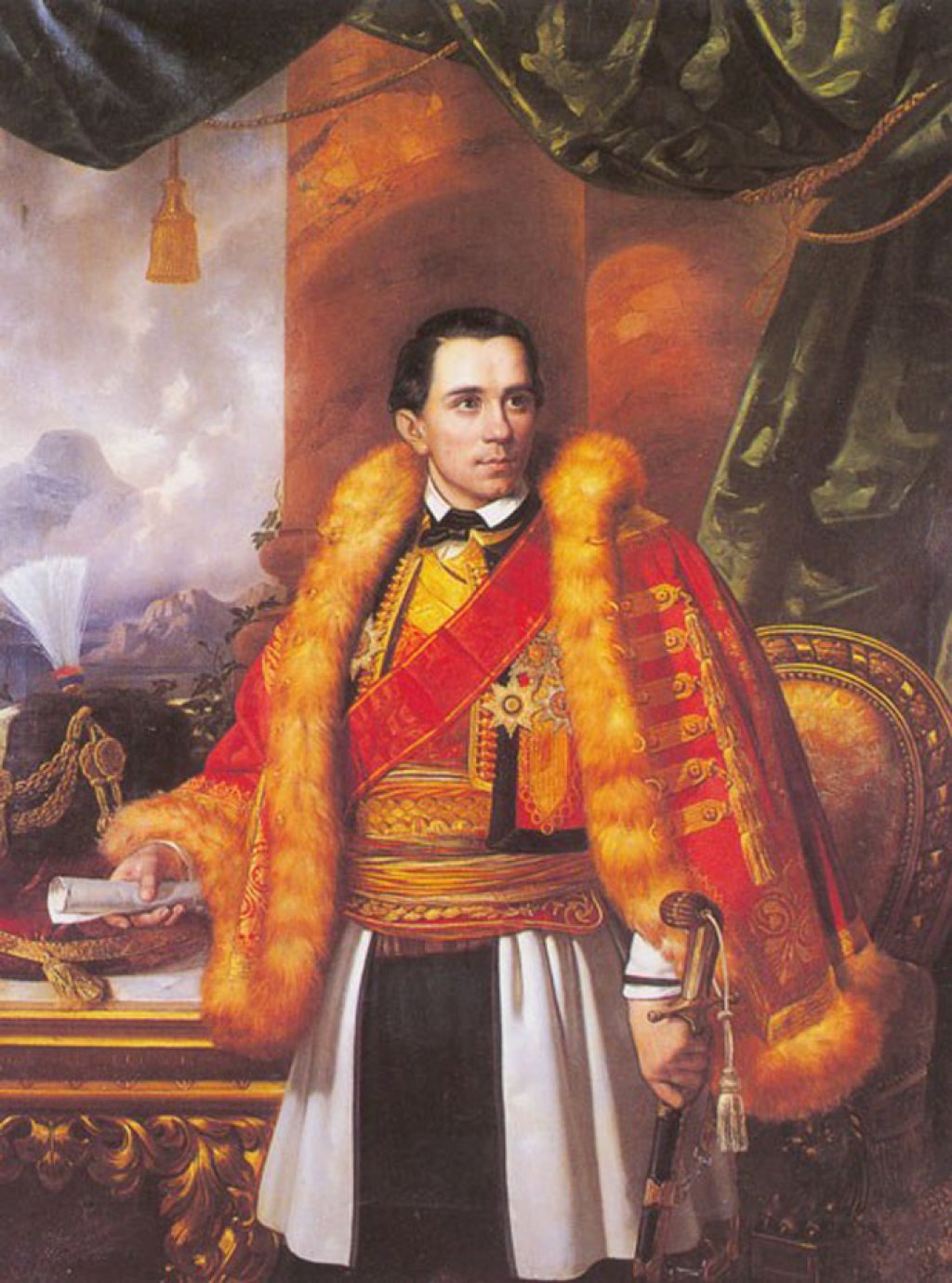
Danilo I Petrović-Njegoš

=== Balšić ===
- Balša I
- Đurađ I
- Balša II
- Đurađ II
- Balša III

=== Crnojević ===
- Đurađ III Crnojević
- Stefan I Crnojević
- Ivan I Crnojević
- Đurađ IV Crnojević
- Đurađ V Crnojević
- Staniša Crnojević
- Arsenije III Crnojević

=== Petrović-Njegoš ===
- Danilo I Petrović-Njegoš
- Petar I Petrović Njegoš
- Petar II Petrović Njegoš
- Nicholas I of Montenegro

=== Princes ===
- Prince Boris I Petrović-Njegoš of Montenegro
- Crown Prince Danilo I Aleksandar Petrović-Njegoš of Montenegro
- Prince Michael I Petrović-Njegoš of Montenegro
- Prince Milo Petrović-Njegoš of Montenegro
- Prince Mirko Dimitri Petrović-Njegoš of Montenegro
- Prince Nikola II Petrović-Njegoš of Montenegro

=== Princesses ===
- Princess Altinaï of Montenegro
- Princess Anastasia Petrović-Njegoš of Montenegro/Grand Duchess Anastasia Nicholaievna of Montenegro
- Princess Milica Petrović-Njegoš of Montenegro/Grand Duchess Militsa Nicholaievna of Montenegro
- Princess Jelena Petrović-Njegoš of Montenegro/Queen Elena of Italy
- Princess Ljubica (Zorka) Petrović-Njegoš of Montenegro/ Ljubica (Zorka) of the Kingdom of Serbs, Croats, and Slovenes
- Princess Anna Petrović-Njegoš of Montenegro
- Princess Ksenija Petrović-Njegoš of Montenegro

== Religion ==
=== Saints ===
- Petar I Petrović-Njegoš/Saint Peter of Cetinje
- Petar II Petrović-Njegoš/Saint Peter II of Cetinje
- Saint Vasilije Ostroški
- Saint Jovan Vladimir
- Saint Stefan Štiljanović
- Saint Stefan of Piperi

=== Religious figures ===
- Andrija Zmajević
- Vicko Bujović
- Leopold Mandić (Saint)
- Ozana of Kotor (beatified)

== Sports ==
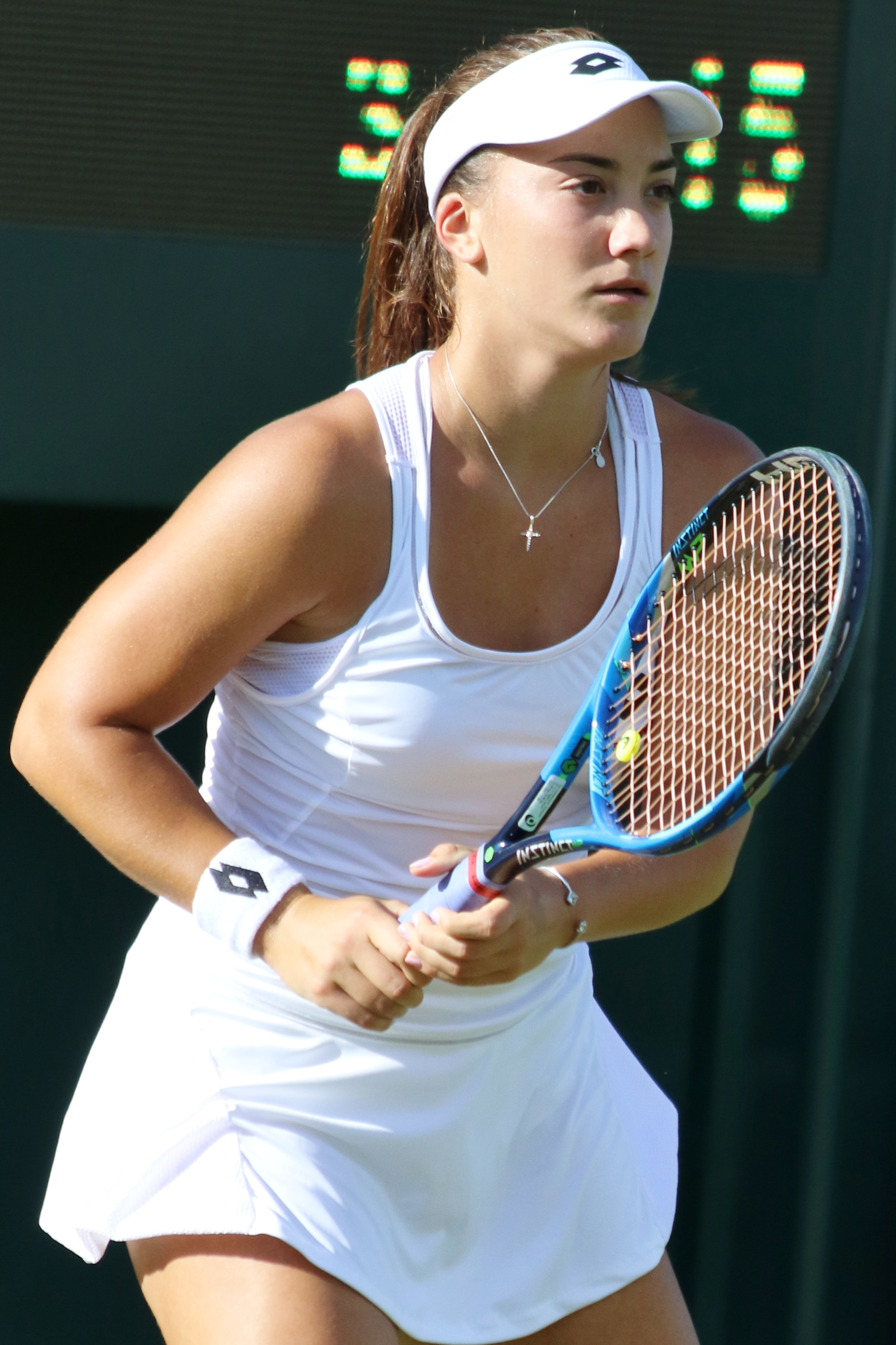
Danka Kovinić

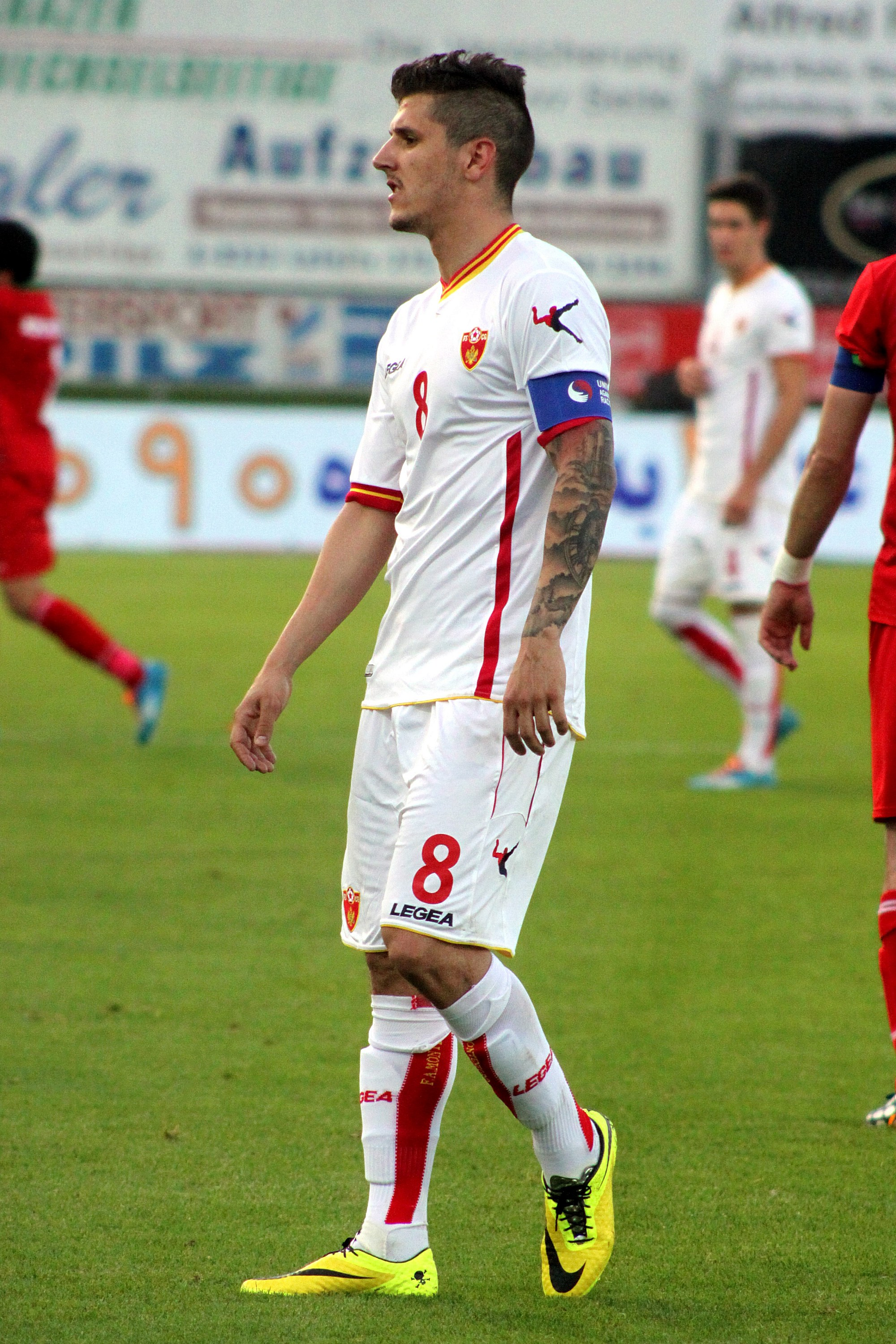
Stevan Jovetić

=== Football ===
- Adam Marušić
- Aleksandar Boljević
- Andjelo Rudović
- David Mirković
- Dejan Damjanović
- Dejan Savićević
- Predrag Mijatović
- Sead Hakšabanović
- Mirko Vučinić
- Marko Vešović
- Nikola Vukčević (footballer, born 1991)
- Stevan Jovetić
- Nikola Krstović
- Luka Đorđević
- Danijel Petković
- Marko Baša
- Stefan Savić
- Stefan Mugoša
- Simon Vukčević
- Vasilije Adžić
- Viktor Đukanović
- Vladimir Jovović
- Žarko Tomašević
- Mirsad Huseinović
- Refik Sabanadzovic

=== Basketball ===
- Blagota Sekulić
- Boris Bakić
- Bojan Dubljević
- Miloš Borisov
- Marko Simonović (basketball, born 1999)
- Nikola Ivanović
- Marko Todorović
- Nemanja Đurišić
- Nikola Mirotić
- Nikola Vučević
- Halil Kanacević
- Nikola Pavličević
- Nikola Peković
- Nemanja Radović
- Ognjen Čarapić
- Predrag Drobnjak
- Taylor Rochestie (born 1985), American-Montenegrin player in the Israel Basketball Premier League
- Velibor Radović (born 1972), Montenegrin-Israeli professional basketball player
- Zoran Nikolić

==== Coaches ====
- Gregg Popovich
- Dejan Radonjić
- Zvezdan Mitrovic
- Vlado Scepanovic

=== Handball ===
- Armelle Attingré
- Petar Kapisoda
- Alen Muratović
- Katarina Bulatović
- Majda Mehmedović
- Jovanka Radičević
- Milena Raičević
- Bojana Popović
- Marina Rajčić
- Đurđina Jauković
- Vuko Borozan
- Sonja Barjaktarović
- Maja Savić
- Anđela Bulatović
- Marija Jovanović
- Ema Ramusović
- Radmila Miljanić-Petrović
- Andrea Klikovac
- Žarko Marković
- Vasko Ševaljević
- Vladan Lipovina
- Stevan Vujović

=== Hockey ===
- Lynden Lakovic
- Scott Perunovich

=== American Football ===
- Novo Bojovic

=== Baseball ===
- George Vukovich
- Babe Martin

=== Water Polo ===
- Nikola Janović
- Mlađan Janović
- Veljko Uskoković
- Vladimir Gojković
- Aleksandar Ivović
- Draško Brguljan
- Filip Klikovac
- Jovan Vavic (lived in Montenegro)

=== Tennis ===
- Miloš Raonić
- Danka Kovinić

=== Martial Arts ===
==== Boxing ====
- Dejan Zlatičanin
- Vukašin Dobrašinović
- Boško Drašković
- Milorad Gajović
- Miodrag Perunović
- Janko Vučinić
- Milorad Žižić

==== Kickboxing ====
- Arian Sadiković
- Ivan Strugar
- Goran Radonjić

==== Judo ====
- Srđan Mrvaljević
- Dragomir Bečanović
- Nicholas Delpopolo

=== American football ===
- Novo Bojović

== Scientists ==
=== Physics ===
- Dragan Hajduković
- Sanja Damjanović

=== Chemistry ===
- Paul L. Modrich

=== Computer science ===
- Nenad Medvidović

=== Electrical engineering ===
- Ljubiša Stanković

=== Linguists ===
- Vojislav Nikčević

== Other ==
- Nero Wolfe, fictional detective created by American writer Rex Stout
- Darinka Mirković Borović, nurse during World War I and a bearer of the Albanian Commemorative Medal
