= Socialist Republic of Montenegro =

Federated state of Yugoslavia (1945–1992)

Coordinates: 42°47′N 19°28′E

People's Republic of Montenegro (1945–1963) Народна Република Црна Гора (Serbo-Croatian) Socialist Republic of Montenegro (1963–1991) Социјалистичка Република Црна Гора (Serbo-Croatian) Republic of Montenegro (1991–1992) Република Црна Гора (Serbo-Croatian)
- 1944–1992
- Flag Emblem

- Location of Montenegro in Yugoslavia
- Status: Constituent republic of Yugoslavia
- Capital: Titograd
- Common languages: Serbo-Croatian (Serbian standard); Albanian
- Government: 1944–1990: Unitary communist state 1990–1992: Unitary parliamentary republic
- Leader of the LCM
  - 1945–1963: Blažo Jovanović (first)
  - 1989–1991: Momir Bulatović (last)
- Head of state
  - 1945–1946: Niko Miljanić (first)
  - 1990–1992: Momir Bulatović (last)
- Head of government
  - 1945–1953: Blažo Jovanović (first)
  - 1989–1992: Radoje Kontić (last)
- Legislature: People's Assembly
- History
  - ZAVNOCGB: 15 December 1944
  - End of WWII: 8 May 1945
  - Constitutional Amendment: December 1992

Population
  - 1991 census: 615,035
- ISO 3166 code: ME
Preceded by	Succeeded by
German occupied territory of Montenegro	Federal Republic of Yugoslavia; Republic of Montenegro

The Socialist Republic of Montenegro (Serbo-Croatian: Socijalistička Republika Crna Gora / Социјалистичка Република Црна Гора), commonly referred to as Socialist Montenegro or simply Montenegro, was one of the six republics forming the Socialist Federal Republic of Yugoslavia and the nation state of the Montenegrins. It is a predecessor of the modern-day Montenegro.

Socialist Montenegro was a non-nationalist state and Serbo-Croatian was its official language. Prior to its formation, Montenegro was part of Zeta banovina administrative unit of Kingdom of Yugoslavia.

Between 1945 and 1963, the Montenegrin government embarked on a program of rapid industrialization, nationalization of private property, and collectivization of agriculture, following the wider Yugoslav socialist development strategy. Political control was exercised through the League of Communists of Montenegro, the local branch of the LCY, which played a central role in governance and ideological supervision.

The 1963 Constitution marked a shift by renaming the republic and modestly redefining its status within the federation. A more significant transformation occurred after the 1974 Yugoslav Constitution, which granted Montenegro and other republics increased autonomy, particularly in governance, foreign relations, and economic planning. Nonetheless, Montenegro remained loyal to federal unity, often aligning closely with Belgrade's political direction.

Montenegrin politics during this era were relatively stable but tightly controlled. Dissent was minimal until the 1980s, when a broader liberalization across Yugoslavia led to increasing national expression and the emergence of reformist voices. These shifts, combined with the federation's deepening political and economic crisis, culminated in the collapse of the socialist regime. In 1991, Montenegro began its transition toward multiparty democracy, formally ending decades of communist rule.

== History ==
On 7 July 1963, the People's Republic of Montenegro (Serbo-Croatian: Narodna Republika Crna Gora / Народна Република Црна Гора) was renamed the "Socialist Republic of Montenegro" (a change ratified both by the Federal Constitution and the newly created Montenegrin Constitution in 1963) with Serbo-Croatian as the official language. In 1991, as the League of Communists of Montenegro changed its name to Democratic Party of Socialists of Montenegro after the first multi-party elections, the adjective "Socialist" was erased from the republic's title (ratified by the Constitutional Amendment LXXXIV of August 2, 1991). Montenegro joined the Federal Republic of Yugoslavia on 27 April 1992 after a referendum was held on 1 March on the question of whether Montenegro should remain a part of Yugoslavia or pursue independence. The flag and emblem were changed in December 1993.

== Demographics ==
1971 census:

- Montenegrins: 355,632 (67.15%)
- ethnic Muslims: 70,236 (13.26%)
- Serbs: 39,512 (7.46%)
- Albanians: 35,671 (6.74%)
- Yugoslavs: 10,943 (2.07%)
- Croats: 9,192 (1.74%)
- Total: 529,604 inhabitants

1981 census:

- Montenegrins: 400,488 (68.54%)
- ethnic Muslims: 78,080 (13.36%)
- Albanians: 37,735 (6.46%)
- Yugoslavs: 31,243 (5.35%)
- Serbs: 19,407 (3.32%)
- Croats: 6,904 (1.18%)
- Roma: 1,471 (0.25%)
- Macedonian: 875 (0.15%)
- Slovenes: 564 (0.1%)
- Hungarians: 238 (0.04%)
- Germans: 107 (0.02%)
- Russians: 96 (0.02%)
- Italians: 45 (0.01%)
- other: 816 (0.14%)
- No response: 301 (0.05%)
- Regional affiliation: 1,602 (0.27%)
- Unknown: 4,338 (0.74%)
- Total: 584,310 inhabitants

1991 census:

- Montenegrins: 380,467 (61.86%)
- ethnic Muslims: 89,614 (14.57%)
- Serbs: 57,453 (9.34%)
- Albanians: 40,415 (6.57%)
- Yugoslavs: 26,159 (4.25%)
- Croats: 6,244 (1.02%)
- Roma: 3,282 (0.53%)
- Macedonians: 1,072 (0.17%)
- Slovenes: 369 (0.06%)
- Hungarians: 205 (0.03%)
- Germans: 124 (0.02%)
- Russians: 118 (0.02%)
- Italians: 58 (0.01%)
- other: 437 (0.07%)
- No response: 1,944 (0.32%)
- Regional affiliation: 998 (0.16%)
- Unknown: 6,076 (0.99%)
- Total: 615,035 inhabitants

== Heads of institutions ==
=== President ===
- President of the Montenegrin Anti-Fascist Assembly of National Liberation
  - Niko Miljanić (15 November 1943 – 21 November 1946)
- Presidents of the Presidency of the People's Assembly
  - Miloš Rašović (21 November 1946 – 6 November 1950)
  - Nikola Kovačević (6 November 1950 – 4 February 1953)
- Presidents of the People's Assembly
  - Nikola Kovačević (4 February 1950 – 15 December 1953)
  - Blažo Jovanović (15 December 1953 – 12 July 1962)
  - Filip Bajković (12 July 1962 – 5 May 1963)
  - Andrija Mugoša (5 May 1963 – 5 May 1967)
  - Veljko Milatović (5 May 1967 – 6 October 1969)
  - Vidoje Žarković (6 October 1969 – April 1974)
  - Budislav Šoškić (April 1974 – 5 April 1974)
- Presidents of the Presidency
  - Veljko Milatović (5 April 1974 – 7 May 1982)
  - Veselin Đuranović (7 May 1982 – 7 May 1983)
  - Marko Orlandić (7 May 1983 – 7 May 1984)
  - Miodrag Vlahović (7 May 1984 – 7 May 1985)
  - Branislav Šoškić (6 May 1985 – 6 May 1986)
  - Radivoje Brajović (6 May 1986 – 6 May 1988)
  - Božina Ivanović (6 May 1988 – 13 January 1989)
  - Slobodan Simović (acting) (13 January 1989 – 17 March 1989)
  - Branko Kostić (17 March 1989 – 23 December 1990)
  - Momir Bulatović (23 December 1990 – December 1993)

=== Prime minister ===
- Minister for Montenegro (in the central Yugoslav government)
  - Milovan Đilas (7 March 1945 – 17 April 1945)
- Prime Minister of Montenegro
  - Blažo Jovanović (17 April 1945 – 4 February 1953)
- Presidents of the Executive Council
  - Blažo Jovanović (4 February 1953 – 16 December 1953)
  - Filip Bajković (16 December 1953 – 12 July 1962)
  - Đorđije Pajković (16 December 1962 – 25 June 1963)
  - Veselin Đuranović (25 June 1963 – 8 December 1966)
  - Mijuško Šibalić (8 December 1966 – 5 May 1967)
  - Vidoje Žarković (5 May 1967 – 7 October 1969)
  - Žarko Bulajić (7 October 1969 – 6 May 1974)
  - Marko Orlandić (6 May 1974 – 28 April 1978)
  - Momčilo Cemović (28 April 1978 – 7 May 1982)
  - Radivoje Brajović (7 May 1982 – 6 June 1986)
  - Vuko Vukadinović (6 June 1986 – 29 March 1989)
  - Radoje Kontić (29 March 1989 – 15 February 1991)
  - Milo Đukanović (15 February 1991 – December 1993)
