= Goričani =

Goričani may refer to the following places:

- Goričani, Čačak, village in the municipality of Čačak, Serbia
- Goričani, Montenegro, village in Podgorica Capital City, Montenegro
