= Miodrag Vlahović =

Miodrag Vlahović may refer to:

- Miodrag Vlahović (politician, born 1924) (1924–2006), president of the Presidency of the Socialist Republic of Montenegro
- Miodrag Vlahović (politician, born 1961), Montenegrin politician and diplomat
