= Bečanović =

Bečanović (Serbian: Бечановић) is a surname. Notable people with the surname include:

- Aleksandar Bečanović (born 1971), Montenegrin poet, translator and critic
- Dragomir Bečanović (born 1965), judoka
- Miladin Bečanović (born 1973), Montenegrin footballer
- Stefan Bečanović (born 1990), sprinter
