= Nikola Petanović =

Montenegrin writer

Nicholas Petanovich, born Nikola Petanović (Serbian Cyrillic: Никола Петановић; 1892 – 29 January 1932), also known under the alias Naiad, was an American Montenegrin emigrant, philosopher, writer, political publicist and fighter for Montenegro's sovereignty and independence. He was one of the very few amongst the Montenegrin diaspora to achieve higher-level education.

== Early life ==
Nikola Petanovic was born in 1892 in the village of Podgor in Crmnica, Principality of Montenegro. In 1912, he emigrated to the United States of America at the invitation of his brother Mitar Petanovic, who had already settled there and become a US citizen. Young Nikola studied English in Butte, Montana, the then-largest Montenegrin emigration colony in the United States and quickly became prolific in it. To support himself he worked on ranches during the season, having little time for his studies in the libraries. For his nickname he chose "The Naiad", referring the mythological nymph that had the power of precognition, implying that he would do the same for Montenegro. Later he moved to California and started his literary publicist career. In 1923, he published in San Francisco in Serbo-Croat his first work, the "Ponos života" ("Pride of Life"), a poetic philosophical novel. He was plagued by extreme poverty to the end of his life.

== Political work ==
Upon hearing about the 1918 unification of Montenegro with the Kingdom of Serbia, Nikola was gravely worried. Maintaining that Montenegro's sovereignty had been unjustly extinguished, from 1924 he organized the growing post-World War I Montenegrin emigration's intelligentsia in North America. He went forth publishing brochures and holding lectures about facts about Montenegro, attempting to inform and unite the Montenegrin diaspora on the West Coast. In 1927, he formed a "Board for a Sovereign and Independent Montenegro" and met with a member of the House of Petrović-Njegoš with the same Montenegrin sovereigntist ideas, Milo Petrović-Njegoš. He became the Editor-in-Chief of the Board's political magazine, the "Montenegrin Mirror", which spread the word in English advancing the creation of an independent Montenegro, separate from the Kingdom of Serbs, Croats and Slovenes. He chose the name as an ironic protest to one of the major works of the Montenegrin writer Petar II Petrović-Njegoš, the "Serb Mirror" (Огледало српско). In 1929, Nikola expanded cooperation with Prince Milo Petrović-Njegoš forming with him, freedom fighters Krsto Zrnov Popović and Marko Zekov Popović, and former regent Evgenije Popović the "Montenegrin National Committee" in Geneva bent on uniting the whole Montenegrin emigration. The Committee published the brochure "The Greatest Crime in History," determining that there had been never a greater crime in the history of mankind than the annexation of Montenegro by Serbia. Petanovic saw in Prince Milo Petrović-Njegoš a possible new monarch of a restored Montenegrin kingdom and dedicated to him a poem: "The Royal Heritage will be Restored; The Sun shall Smile upon Montenegro once again".

Petanovic attempted to use influential people to affect American public opinion and authorities to liken the idea of a sovereign Montenegro, which would have the status of a US protectorate. Nikola had already perceived the United States' future as one of the leading nations in world. The US State Department never heeded his calls however, because it considered the unification legal, legitimate, and irrevocable. Petanovic's aspiration to conduct a free democratically held referendum in the territories of the erstwhile Montenegrin realm that would decide if it would stay in Yugoslavia or regain independence on the basis of the popular in the Western World, self-determination, in this case that of the Montenegrin People, gained no support.

During this period, his most important work was the "Troslavia and five small Slavic nations", an ironic depiction of the Yugoslavian kingdom supporting the proposals of the Kingdom of Italy for breakup of the South Slavic country and establishment of several Slavic mini-nations at the coast of the Adriatic Sea under Italian influence. Nicholas was one of the few who already also depicted the Macedonians as a distinct people as well. His other significant works were "Without Homeland", referring to the Montenegrin people, the "Naiad" and "Dayan". Petanovic saw the origins of Montenegro in ancient Doclea and claimed that the specific ethno-genetic makeup in the ethnogenesis of Illyrian blood, which allegedly made the Slavs living in what was once Montenegro far closer to the Albanians, was sufficient for them to be proclaimed as a distinct ethnic group, akin but not identified directly with the Serbs themselves – in this claim laid as the basis for Petanovic's desire to ask for national self-determination of the Montenegrins. Although not essentially a historian, Nikola touched the historical subjects claiming that the Slavic people appeared in the territories of Montenegro only in the 9th century in its ethnic form and through mixing with the local populations, claimed that a distinct mix identity was born in Montenegro.

== Death and legacy ==
In 1931, Nicholas Petanovich withdrew from public life and abandoned his activities on promoting Montenegro's independence, claiming he was fighting a completely lost cause. He died on 29 January 1932 in his 40th year due to poor health caused by his unhealthy lifestyle, never marrying nor having children because of his virtually non-existent social life. With his death the Montenegrin Mirror stopped being published and the Montenegrin Committee was disbanded. He was buried at the Colma cemetery just outside San Francisco, California.

Nikola Petanovic was completely an unknown person to the public eye and his works never widespread until the sovereigntist and pro-independence movements emerged in the late 20th century with Montenegro promoting and justifying its secession from its state union with the Republic of Serbia. An example is the Montenegrin Matrix, which published the work of Gordan Stojović "Nikola Petanović – Crnogorsko Ogledalo" (Nikola Petanovich – The Montenegrin Mirror) that revealed the first facts about this historical figure to the Montenegrin public.

== Works ==
- Ponos Života (The Pride of Life), San Francisco (1923)
- Troslavia and Five Small Slavic Nations
- Naiad
- Dayan
