= Borislav Jovanović =

Borislav Jovanović may refer to:

- Borislav Jovanović (writer) (born 1941), Montenegrin writer, poet and literary critic
- Borislav Jovanović (footballer) (born 1986), Serbian football player
