= Brajović =

Brajović is a surname of South Slavic origin. Notable people with this surname include:

- Ivan Brajović (born 1962), Montenegrin politician
- Radivoje Brajović (born 1935), Montenegrin politician and former prime minister
- Vojislav Brajović (born 1949), Serbian actor
