= Milisav Popović =

Montenegrin author (born 1978)

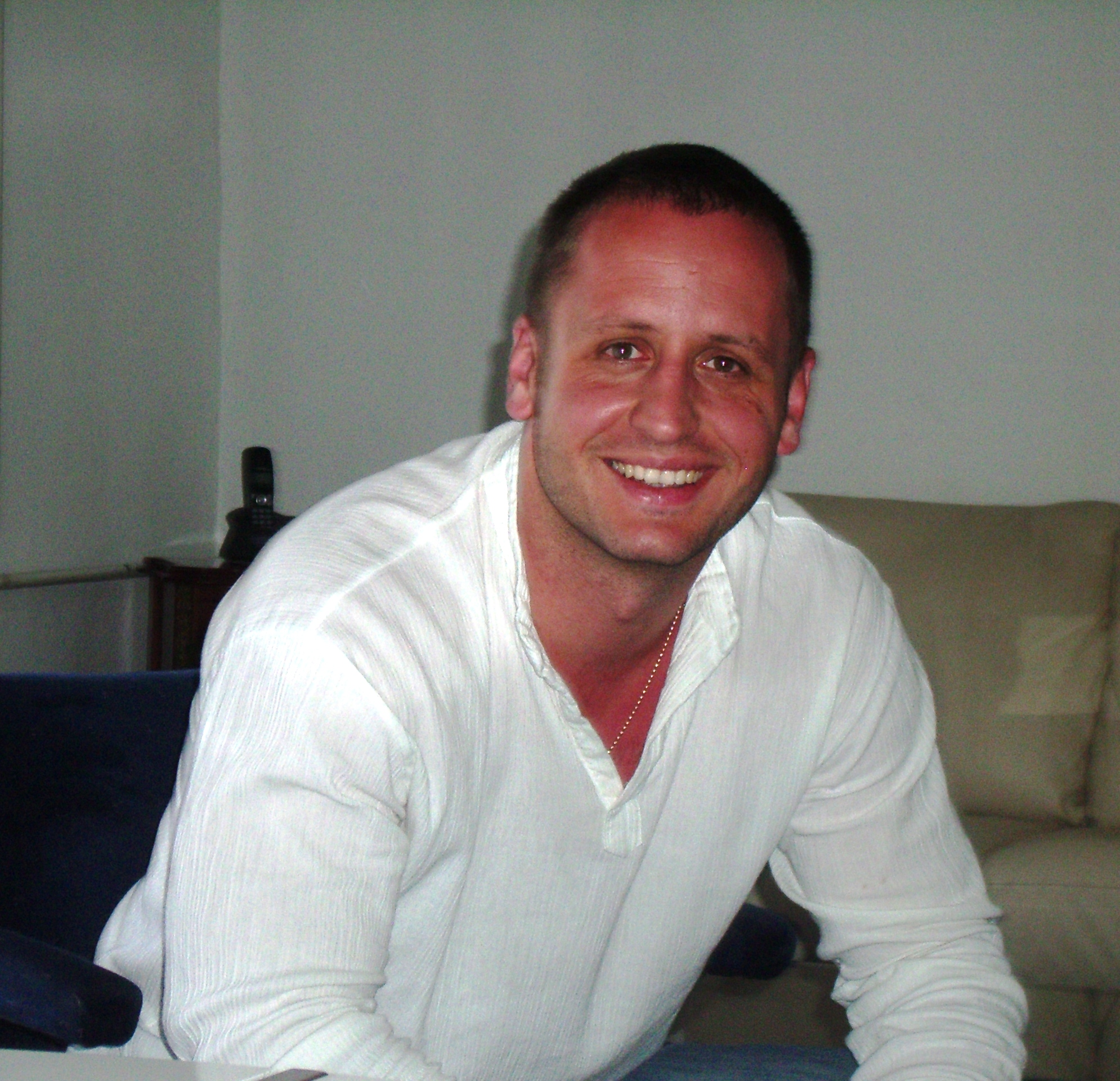
- Born: 23 July 1978 (age 48); Nikšić, SR Montenegro, SFR Yugoslavia
- Occupation: Author
- Writing career
- Genre: Fantasy
- Notable work: Forgotten Mountain

Milisav Popović (born 23 July 1978) is a Montenegrin author who specializes in fantasy. His books include Forgotten Mountain, the first fantasy novel about mythical creatures of the Balkans, and the bestselling book After Sleep.

== Biography ==
Popović was born on 23 July 1978 in Nikšić, Montenegro. After elementary and secondary education, he continued his education at the Belgrade Faculty of Political Science, University of Belgrade, and in 2003 he received his political science diploma for international relations.

After his studies, on the level of Balkan universities, he was chosen to attend a special pilot program in Belgrade in the domain of "rigid and applied psychology". A year later he became the first profiler in the area of what was then Serbia and Montenegro, being qualified for both descriptive and explicative analysis of human behaviour. When he was 24, he returned to Montenegro and started to work, first in the Ministry of Foreign Affairs, and later as a European Integration counsellor for the mayor of Podgorica, Miomir Mugoša.

== Life as an author ==
In July 2008, he published his novel "Forgotten Mountain", the first fantasy novel about mythical creatures of the Balkans, which became a bestseller in Montenegro and Serbia in only two months.

In November 2008, he received the "Lyre of Orpheus", the first place prose award, on an international literature manifestation organized by the Academy of European Culture, that was held in November 2008, in Sofia and Krumovgrad, Bulgaria.

In February 2009, he received an award for the "Best Book" in an event organised with the goal of promoting individuals and events in 2008 in Montenegro; nine authors received their laureates. Action lasted for a month, and media coverage was done by RTV Atlas.

Popović's essay on Montenegro was published in a specialized edition of National Geographic Traveler - "50 Places of Lifetime" in October 2009. This edition is published once in 10 years and represents one of the most important advertisers of tourism development in the world. Popović's essay brought renown to Montenegro for the fact that the cover page of the magazine was a motif of (Sveti Stefan). Popović was invited because of his success with "Forgotten Mountain"

Early 2010, Popović was awarded author of the year national "Wild Beauty" award by the Montenegrin president Filip Vujanović. His weekly newspaper column "Food for Your Soul", which is published by the "DAN" newspaper, quickly became the most read newspaper column in Montenegro.

Early 2011, the American Comparative Literature Association published a compilation of the most important novelists from Montenegro. Next to three historically renowned names was Milisav Popović. The justification for choosing him was his columns and its unusual content that gained attention beyond Montenegro. The columns soon became widely read, and with a publisher's help, some of them reached an overseas audience. A significant part of his columns was translated by enthusiasts, not certified interpreters. The quality of those translations, and of the columns alone, attracted the attention of specialized literary organizations from the USA.

In June 2011, Popovic was elected as a director of the new National Library in Podgorica, the capital of Montenegro. Mayor Mugosa entrusted him with a mandate for one year to establish a new library system and other cultural offices by European standards "as soon as possible." Until June 2012, the library recorded a large number of visitors, developed intensive international cooperation, regional connectivity and offered a non-specific attractive facilities. Ambassadors of foreign countries elected Popovic institution for "hot spot for international connection" (a hot spot for good international cooperation). Popovic was named the Best Manager in the culture for the year 2012. In early June 2012, followed by a call from the Mayor, Popovic returned to the cabinet.
