= Pobjeda =

Montenegrin daily newspaper

- Pobjeda issue on 6 June 2006
- Type: Daily newspaper
- Format: Berliner
- Owner: Media Nea Group
- Founder: Communist Party of Yugoslavia
- Publisher: Nova Pobjeda d.o.o.
- Editor: Nenad Zečević
- Founded: 24 September 1944; 82 years ago
- Political alignment: Centre-left; Democratic Party of Socialists; Montenegrin nationalism
- Language: Montenegrin
- Headquarters: 19. decembra br. 5, Podgorica
- Country: Montenegro
- Circulation: Print - est. 2.600 (2019); Online - 796.550/month
- ISSN: 0350-4379
- Website: pobjeda.me

The Pobjeda (Cyrillic: Пoбjeдa, pronounced [pôbjeda], lit. 'The Victory') is the Montenegrin national daily newspaper. Having been published for 80 years, it is the oldest Montenegrin newspaper still in circulation, as well as the oldest Montenegrin active publication. Until September 1997, it was the only daily newspaper printed in Montenegro. On 21 May 2010, the newspaper dropped the Cyrillic script in favour of the Latin script.

== History ==
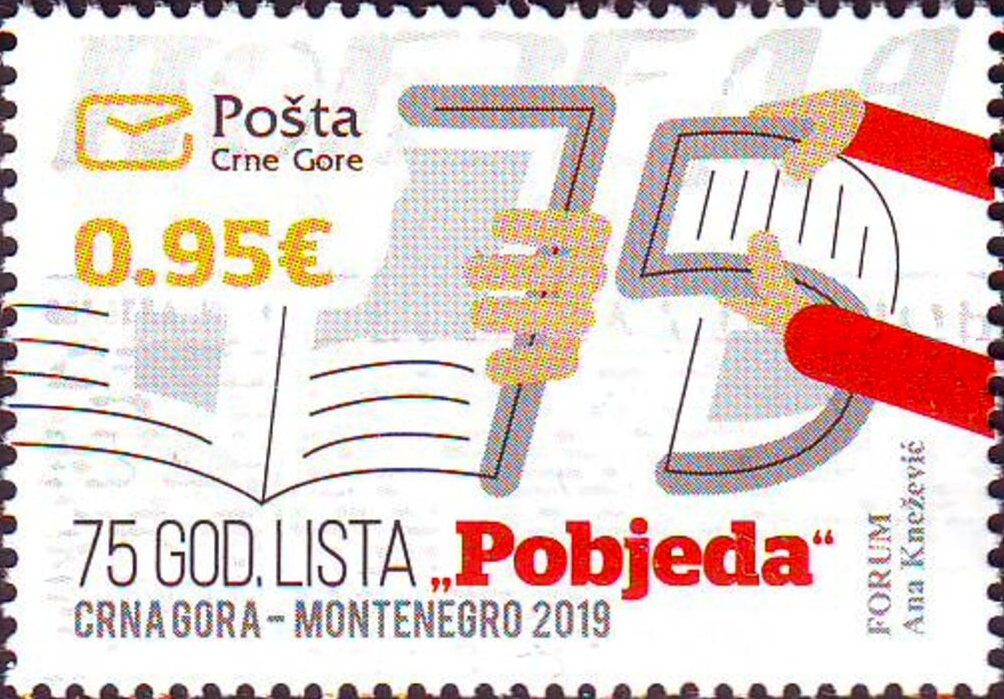
A 2019 stamp of Montenegro dedicated to the 75th anniversary of Pobjeda

The first issue of Pobjeda was published on 24 October 1944 in Nikšić as a part of the National liberation front of Montenegro (Narodnooslobodilački front Crne Gore). Three more issues came out before Pobjeda began to be published in Cetinje, which would remain Pobjeda's home until 1954, when it moved to Podgorica.

The first editorial team were: Puniša Perović (editor-in-chief), Branko Drašković (deputy editor-in-chief), Jovan Vukmanović (editor of the NOB column), Mirko Banjević (culture column editor), Erih Koš (foreign policy column editor), Aleksandar Obradović (internal column editor) and Radovan Đuranović (editor of NOF column). The first editorial was written by Blažo Jovanović. He also gave the name to the newspaper. One of the first couriers was Vito Nikolić, who later became journalist of the same newspaper.

Pobjeda was a bi-weekly and weekly newspaper until 1 January 1975 when it switched to daily frequency. The change happened when the headquarters of Pobjeda moved from old location (Graphic institute building, at the Ribnica river bank) to the new building, in the new city quarter (Bulevar Revolucije 11).

For many decades in the SFR Yugoslavia, Pobjeda was sold on news stands in Belgrade, Sarajevo, Split, Zagreb and other large cities in Bosnia and Herzegovina, Croatia, Macedonia, Serbia and Slovenia. Many news stands in Montenegro were owned by Pobjeda.

After the breakup of Yugoslavia, copies of Pobjeda were sold in Montenegro and Serbia. Pobjeda also published several magazines; today Arena is the first sports newspaper in Montenegro. Pobjeda's books and publications have received awards at many prestigious events. Pobjeda's mainly Montenegrin readership was diluted following the establishment of two other newspapers - Vijesti and Dan.

Until 1997 Pobjeda was the only print medium published in Montenegro, but from 1997 competition from daily newspapers, together with the complex and sometimes chaotic media situation in Montenegro, made Pobjeda financially vulnerable, and caused the company to go into bankruptcy. In November 2007, the Montenegrin government announced its intention to sell 51% of its stake in Pobjeda (thus keeping the remaining 25.7% for itself "in order to be able to influence strategic decision of the new owner") and opened a tender for qualifying offers to do so. By the tender's closing on March 4, 2008, no offers had been made. In early May 2008, the government announced that it would open another tender by the end of May 2008. The government also let it be known that in order to make the entity more appealing to potential buyers, it was considering writing off Pobjeda's €2.2 million debt to the State through personal income taxes and contributions. In late June 2008, Pobjeda posted a loss of €3.75 million for the calendar year 2007.

Besides the daily newspaper, Pobjeda also publishes a number of periodical magazines such as Objektiv, a weekly journal devoted to cinema and popular culture; and, since 2005, Arena, a Podgorica-based weekly (formerly daily) sports journal.

Pobjeda was privatised in December 2014, and is now owed by Media Nea group. For the first time, the company was in 2015 listed on the State Tax Authority's “White list of taxpayers”, reporting a profit for the first time in its history.

== Notable persons ==
=== Editors-in-chief ===
1. Puniša Perović (1944-1944)
2. Branko Drašković (1945-1945)
3. Jovan Vukmanović (1946-1946)
4. Niko Simov Martinović (1947-1947)
5. Pavle Aleksić (1948-1948)
6. Božidar Đurović (1949–1951)
7. Budislav Šoškić (1951–1953)
8. Veljko Milatović (1953–1954)
9. Ante Slovinić (1954-1954)
10. Veselin Velizarov Đuranović (1954–1958)
11. Vladimir Popović (1958–1965)
12. Miodrag Đukić (1965-1965)
13. Mirko Vraneš (1965–1970)
14. Milo Kralj (1970–1974)
15. Svetozar Durutović (1974–1978)
16. Marko Špadijer (1978–1982)
17. Petar Bošković (1982–1984)
18. Miodrag Bošković (1984–1985)
19. Zoran Popović (1985–1987)
20. Savić Jovanović (1987–1989)
21. Momir Škuljić (1989-1989)
22. Šćepan Vuković (1990–1989)
23. Vidoje Konatar (1989–1990)
24. Nikola Ivanović (1992–1994)
25. Slobodan Vuković (1994–2002)
26. Milorad Rašović (2002-2002)
27. Slobodan Vuković (2002–2003)
28. Saša Knežević (2003–2004)
29. Andrija Racković (2004–2009)
30. Srđan Kusovac (2009–2013)
31. Vesna Šofranac (2013–2014)
32. Draško Đuranović (2014–2024)
33. Nenad Zečević (2024-)

=== Journalists ===
- Aleksandar Leso Ivanović,
- Erih Koš
- Jovan Nikitović
- Mirko Banjević
- Mihailo Lalić
- Miodrag Ilić Tuč (photojournalist)
- Radomir Bato Tomić
- Ratko Vujošević
- Vito Nikolić
- Zagorka Berkuljan
- Živko Đurović (caricaturist)

=== Associates ===
- Darko V. Ribnikar, Serbian journalist
- Radovan Zogović, Montenegrin poet
- Marko Vešović, Bosnian and Montenegrin poet
- Veljko Vlahović, Montenegrin politician

== List of awards won by Pobjeda ==
- Order of the brotherhood and unity with golden wreath by Josip Broz Tito (SFR Yugoslavia, 1974)
- Order of the Labour by Svetozar Marović (State Union of Serbia and Montenegro, 2004)
