= Puniša Perović =

Yugoslav partisan (1911–1985)

- Born: 5 May 1911; Danilovgrad, Kingdom of Montenegro
- Died: 27 March 1985 (aged 71); Belgrade, SR Serbia, Yugoslavia
- Occupations: politician, journalist, poet

Puniša Perović (Serbian Cyrillic: Пуниша Перовић; 5 May 1911 – Belgrade, 27 March 1985) was a Yugoslav politician, journalist, poet. He was one of the founders of Pobjeda, the oldest Montenegrin daily.

== Biography ==
He was born on May 5, 1911, in Šobaići near Danilovgrad. He finished high school in Nikšić, where he started writing poetry during his studies. He studied in Belgrade. He first entered the Faculty of Philosophy and then the Faculty of Law.

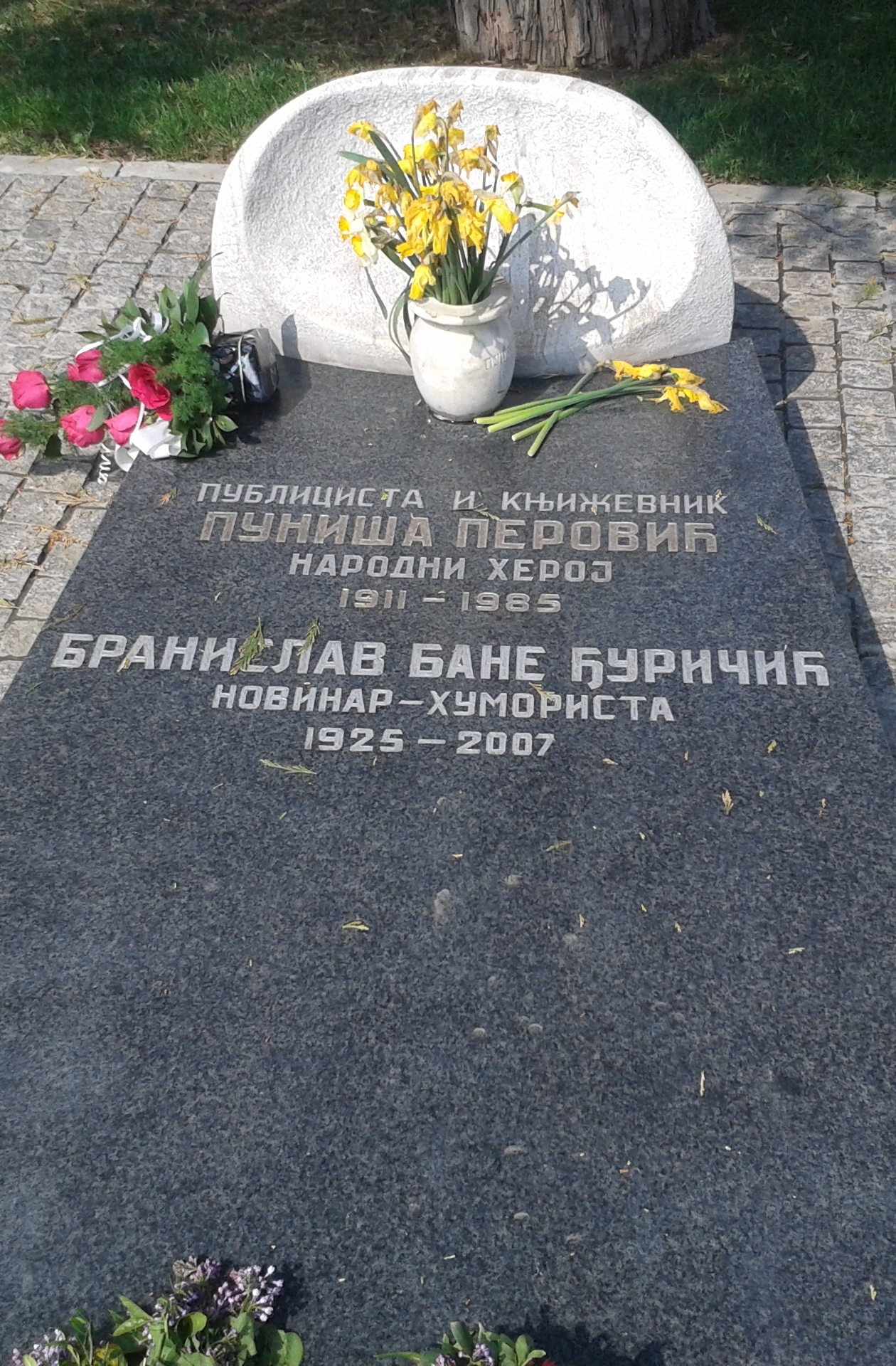
Perović's grave in Belgrade

As a student, he joins the student movement. At the age of twenty, in 1933 he joined the illegal Communist Party of Yugoslavia. He was targeted by the gendarmerie and the Special Police in Belgrade, which dealt with members of the Communist Party. He was detained twice. Beaten in Glavnjača prison and in the prison on Ada Ciganlija. Both times he was acquitted due to lack of evidence. Until 1941, he was one of journalists of the newspaper Student in Belgrade.

He is one of the organizers of the Thirteenth of July Uprising, political leader of the proletarian brigades, creator of the partisan press and deputy of the Montenegrin Anti-Fascist Assembly of National Liberation. The party entrusted him with the most complex and demanding tasks, including the expansion of the partisan movement in Herzegovina.

When Montenegrin Anti-Fascist Assembly of National Liberation was transformed into the National Assembly of Montenegro in April 1945, and its presidency into the Presidency of the Assembly, the Law on the Formation of the People's Government was adopted by which the first government was appointed. Its president was Blažo Jovanović, and Puniša Perović was appointed as the first minister of education. He was the first Minister of Education of Montenegro after World War II.

He was also the first editor-in-chief of the newspaper Pobjeda, editor-in-chief of the newspaper Borba, vice-president of the Federal Conference of the SSRNJ and a member of the Yugoslav Council of the Federation.

He died in Belgrade on 27. March 1985.

== Awards ==
After World War II, Perović was awarded many high-profile Yugoslav orders, the biggest one of them being the Order of the People's Hero, which he was awarded on 27 November 1953.

1st Row	Order of the People's Hero		
2nd Row	Order of National Liberation	Order of merits for the people	Order of Brotherhood and Unity
3rd Row	Order of Bravery	Commemorative Medal of the Partisans of 1941	—
Note: All Yugoslav decorations are now defunct.

== Works ==
- Četnička izdanja u svjetlosti dokumenata (Nikšić, 1944)
- Sava Kovačević Mizara – narodni heroj, koautor (Cetinje, 1946)
- Статии на клеветничките обвиненија против КПЈ (with Vlajko Begović) (Skopje, 1948)
- Sa srpskim proleterima (Belgrade, 1953)
- Na teme dana (Belgrade, 1957)
- Savremeni međunarodni radnički pokret (Belgrade, 1959)
- Julske vatre (Belgrade, 1961)
- Ratni motivi – članci i zapisi (Cetinje, 1962)
- Problemi saradnje u međunarodnom radničkom pokretu (Zagreb, 1964)
- Pregled istorije međunarodnog radničkog pokreta – stoljeće borbe za socijalizam (1–2) (Belgrade, 1978)
- Crveno sjeme, pesme (Titograd, 1979)
- Razgovori o književnosti – članci i eseji (Cetinje, 1984)
