= Milorad Žižić =

Montenegrin boxer

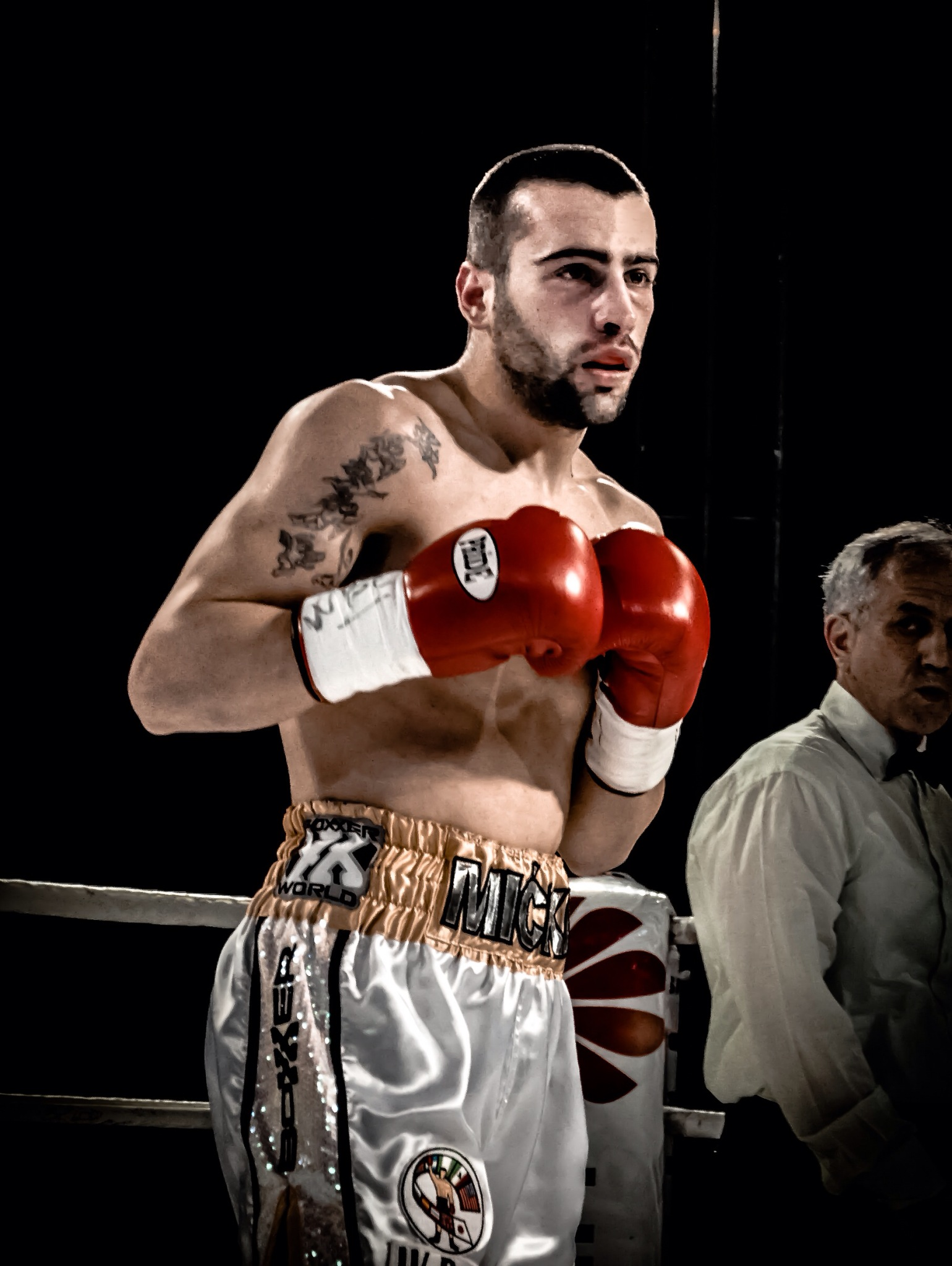

Personal information
- Nickname: Mićko
- Nationality: Montenegrin
- Born: Milorad Žižić; 1 December 1986 (age 39) Nikšić, SR Montenegro, Yugoslavia
- Height: 5 ft 10 in (1.78 m)
- Weight: Middleweight
- Children: 2
- Parent: Veselin Žižić

Boxing career
- Reach: 72 in (183 cm)
- Stance: Orthodox

Boxing record
- Total fights: 13
- Wins: 12
- Win by KO: 6
- Losses: 1
- Draws: 0
- No contests: 0

Milorad Žižić (born 1 December 1986), nicknamed Mićko, is a Montenegrin boxer.

== Professional career ==
Zizic made his professional boxing debut on May 20, 2011 when he beat Croatian boxer Renato Gogošević in Belgrade. In 2012 he became the IBF World Junior Champion. In 2013 he won the WBC Mediterranean title.

In 2014 he signed an exclusive deal with the former four-division world champion Roy Jones Jr.

== Professional boxing record ==
12 Wins (6 Knockouts), 1 Loss, 0 Draws
Res.	Record	Opponent	Type	Rd., Time	Date	Location	Notes
Win	12-1	(Azerbaijan) Rahman Mustafa Yusubov	TKO	8	2015-05-30	El Paso County Coliseum, El Paso, Texas, United States	
Loss	11-1	(United States) Louis Rose	TKO	6 (8)	2015-03-13	We Ko Pa Casino, Fort McDowell, Arizona, United States	vacant NABF Junior middleweight title
Win	11-0	(United States) Dennis Sharpe	UD	6	2014-12-06	Convention Center, North Carolina, United States	
Win	10–0	(Germany) Mehmet Karaka	TKO	1 (6), 1:48	2014-06-07	ASV Halle, Dachau, Germany	
Win	9–0	(Italy) Francesco Basile	KO	2 (12)	2013-04-13	Topolica Hall, Bar, Montenegro	Won WBC Mediterranean Middleweight title.
Win	8–0	(Czech Republic) Michal Pechacek	TKO	8 (10), 2:57	2012-11-18	(Serbia) Universal Hall, Berlin, Germany	Won IBF Youth Light-Middleweight title.
Win	7–0	(Senegal) Mamadou Thiam	UD	8	2012-09-22	Hall of Sports, Niksic, Montenegro	
Win	6–0	(Romania) Mugurel Sebe	UD	6	2012-05-18	Hall of Sports, Belgrade, Serbia	
Win	5–0	(France) Youssouf Doumbia	UD	6	2012-03-24	Hall of Sports, Niksic, Montenegro	
Win	4–0	(Bulgaria) Valentin Stoychev	KO	1 (4)	2011-11-26	Moraca Hall, Podgorica, Montenegro	
Win	3–0	(Bulgaria) Rumen Kostov	UD	4	2011-10-22	Gusenhalle, Gallneukirchen, Austria	
Win	2–0	(Slovakia) Julius Rafael	UD	4	2011-09-09	Stadium, Niksic, Montenegro	
Win	1–0	(Croatia) Renato Gogosevic	KO	1 (4)	2011-05-20	Sport Hall Sumice, Belgrade, Serbia	Zizic's professional debut.
