= Milivoje Mićo Božović =

Montenegrin composer

Milivoje Mićo Božović (born September 3, 1957) is a Montenegrin composer. Born in Goričani, he attended the Faculty of Music in Belgrade. He is currently a professor of music at Vasa Pavić High School for Music in Podgorica. His compositions have been performed across Europe in Montenegro, Serbia, Austria, Italy, Albania, Spain, England, and Germany, among other places.

His most important works include

- Concerto for Clarinet and Orchestra (Koncert za klarinet i orkestar)
- Concerto for Violin and Orchestra (Koncert za violinu i orkestar)
- The second concerto for violin and orchestra (Drugi koncert za violinu i orkestar)
- Concerto for trumpet and orchestra (Koncert za trubu i orkestar)
- Concerto for Horn and Orchestra (Koncert za hornu i orkestar)
- Concerto for Flute and Orchestra (Koncert za flautu i orkestar)
- Concerto for Oboe and Orchestra (Koncert za obou i orkestar)
- Concerto for Cello and Orchestra (Koncert za violončelo i orkestar)
- The third concerto for violin and orchestra (Treći koncert za violinu i orkestar)
- Ends Concert for Piano and Orchestra (Završava koncert za klavir i orkestar)

Other works include

- Two miniatures for piano (Dvije minijature za klavir)
- Four miniatures for piano "Seasons" (Četiri minijature za klavir „Godišnja doba“)
- Simfonijeta
- Jesenje inpresije
- Miniatures for Flute and Orchestra (Minijatura ta flautu i orkestar)
- Miniatures for Trumpet and Orchestra (Minijatura za trubu i orkestar)
- Miniatures for Violin and Orchestra (Minijatura za violinu i orkestar)
- Singing and playing the violin and solo (Pjesma i igra za violinu i solo)
- Five Sketches for Strings (Pet skica za gudače)
