= Vuko Vukadinović =

Politician

Vuko Vukadinović (Cyrillic: Вуко Вукадиновић; 11 August 1937 – 3 November 1993) was a member of the League of Communists of Montenegro and the President of the Executive Council of the Socialist Republic of Montenegro from 1986 to 1989.

Preceded by Radivoje Brajović	President of the Executive Council of Montenegro; 6 June 1986–29 March 1989	Succeeded by Radoje Kontić
