= Erih Koš =

Yugoslav writer (1913–2010)

- Born: 15 April 1913; Sarajevo, Austro-Hungary
- Died: 25 May 2010 (aged 97); Belgrade, Serbia
- Occupations: Journalist, writer and translator

Erih Koš (Erich Kosch; Serbian Cyrillic: Ерих Кош) (April 15, 1913 – May 25, 2010) was a Yugoslav politician, journalist, writer and translator. He was one of the founders of Pobjeda, the oldest Montenegrin daily.

== Biography ==
He was born in Sarajevo, Bosnia and Herzegovina (then a condominium in Austria-Hungary). He graduated from the University of Belgrade's Law School and was active as a lawyer from 1935. In 1941, he participated in the resistance fight and held many different political-cultural positions during and after the Second World War in communist Yugoslavia. In Nikšić in 1944, he was one of the founders and one of the first journalists working for the Pobjeda. As a journalist, he was also associated with Oslobođenje.

Koš wrote mainly novels and narrations, which treat topics of the resistance or problems in Yugoslav society. In addition to his writing, Koš translated Goethe and Chamisso into Serbo-Croatian. In 1967, he won the NIN Prize for his novel Mreža (The Net).

In 1978, he was elected as a member of Serbian Academy of Sciences and Arts in the Department of Language and Literature.

== Works ==
- U vatri - narrations 1947
- Tri hronike - narrations 1949
- Zapisi o mladim ljudima - 1950
- Vreme, narrations 1952
- Čudnovata povest o Kitu Velikom takođe zvanom Veliki Mak, novel 1956
- Il tifo, a novel 1958
- Kao vuci, narrations 1958
- Sneg i led, a novel 1961
- Novosadski pokolj, a novel 1961
- Vrapci Van Pea, a novel 1962
- Prvo lice jednine, narrations 1963
- Imena, a novel 1964
- Taj prokleti zanat spisateljski, essays 1965
- Mreža, a novel 1967
- Satire, 1968
- Mešano društvo, narrations 1969
- Zašto da ne 1971
- Dosije Hrabak, a novel 1971
- Cveće i bodlje, narrations 1972
- The best years, narration dt. 1972
- Na autobuskoj stanici, narrations 1974
- U potrazi za Mesijom, 2 Bde., a novel 1978
- Bosanske priče, narrations 1984
- Satira i satiričari, essays 1985
- Šamforova smrt, novel 1986
- Pisac govora, 1989
- Uzgredne zabeleške, Aphorisms 1990
- Miševi, novel 1991

== Links ==
- "Ерих Кош". Српска Академиjа Наука и Уметности. Archived from the original on 2016-03-05.
