= Romani people in Montenegro =

Romani people in Montenegro Romane manusha ando Montenegro Romi u Crnoj Gori Роми у Црној Гори
Total population
- 5,629 (2023 census)

Regions with significant populations
- Berane Municipality (2.20%); Podgorica Municipality (1.91%); Ulcinj Municipality (1.26%); Tuzi Municipality (0.91%)

Languages
- Balkan Romani, Albanian, Montenegrin

Religion
- Sunni Islam, Eastern Orthodoxy

The oldest settled group are the Kovači (Blacksmiths), a subgroup of the Arlije, who have lived there since the Middle Ages and who converted to Islam during the Ottoman period, they do not speak Balkan Romani, but rather Montenegrin language or Albanian language, they live especially in the towns of Bar and Ulcinj. They do not want to be called Roma and distance themselves from other Roma groups. They have no Roma traditions. They call themselves only as Muslims.

There are also the Gurbeti who belong to the Čergarja group, they were once nomadic. In the 1960s they became sedentary. Most of them have the Christian faith of the Eastern Orthodox Church.

Then there are Muslim Roma, Ashkali and Balkan Egyptians refugees, who came to Montenegro during the Kosovo War in 1999.

The Romani population in Montenegro faces heightened susceptibility to human trafficking and exploitation through prostitution, pornography and forced begging. Within Montenegro, adolescents of Romani descent have frequently engaged in commercial sexual work, with documented evidence indicating that a number of these individuals have experienced sex trafficking victimization. A 2007 report from Montenegro indicated that Romani children were trafficked to engage in theft and forced stealing.
