= Mirko Banjević =

Montenegrin journalist and poet (1905–1968)

- Born: 28 March 1905; Pješivci, Kingdom of Montenegro,
- Died: 6 September 1968 (aged 63); Belgrade, SR Serbia, Yugoslavia
- Occupations: journalist, poet

Mirko Banjević (Cyrillic: Мирко Бањевић; 28 March 1905 — 6 September 1968) was a Montenegrin journalist and poet. He was one of the founders of Pobjeda, the oldest Montenegrin daily.

== Biography ==
He was born in Pješivci in 1905. He studied high school in Nikšić and Trebinje. After graduating from the Faculty of Philosophy in Belgrade, he worked as a journalist and editor of the newspaper Pobjeda and the magazine for literature and culture Svaranje in Podgorica. Until World War II, Banjević was a professor in Gospić and Paraćin. Also, he was a journalist for newspaper Pravda in Belgrade. He worked as an editor in the Belgrade publishing company Rad. He retired as editor of Tanjug.

In Nikšić, there is a literary community "Mirko Banjević". The literary community "Mirko Banjević" was founded in 1979. The "Mirko Banjević" literary award was also established, which is awarded for poetry and prose at the level of the state of Montenegro.

== Works ==
- Pobune uma (Nikšić, 1930)
- Šume, Nikšić (1930)
- Ognjena jutra (Paraćin, 1940)
- Njegošev spomenik (Cetinje, 1947)
- Zemlja na kamenu (Beograd, 1950)
- Zvjezdani voz (Zagreb, 1951)
- Bezdani (Cetinje, 1956)
- Sutjeska (Cetinje, 1961)
- Do iskapi (Beograd, 1964)
- Roždanici (Cetinje, 1968)
