= Montenegrin Anti-Fascist Assembly of National Liberation =

Political organ of the resistance in Montenegro during World War II

The State Anti-fascist Council for the National Liberation of Montenegro and Boka (Serbo-Croatian: Zemaljsko antifašističko vijeće narodnog oslobođenja Crne Gore i Boke, ZAVNOCGB, Земаљскo aнтифашистичко виjеће народног ослобођења Црнe Горe и Бокe, ЗABHOЦГиБ) was formed as the highest governing institution of the anti-fascist resistance movement in Montenegro, in the former Kingdom of Yugoslavia.

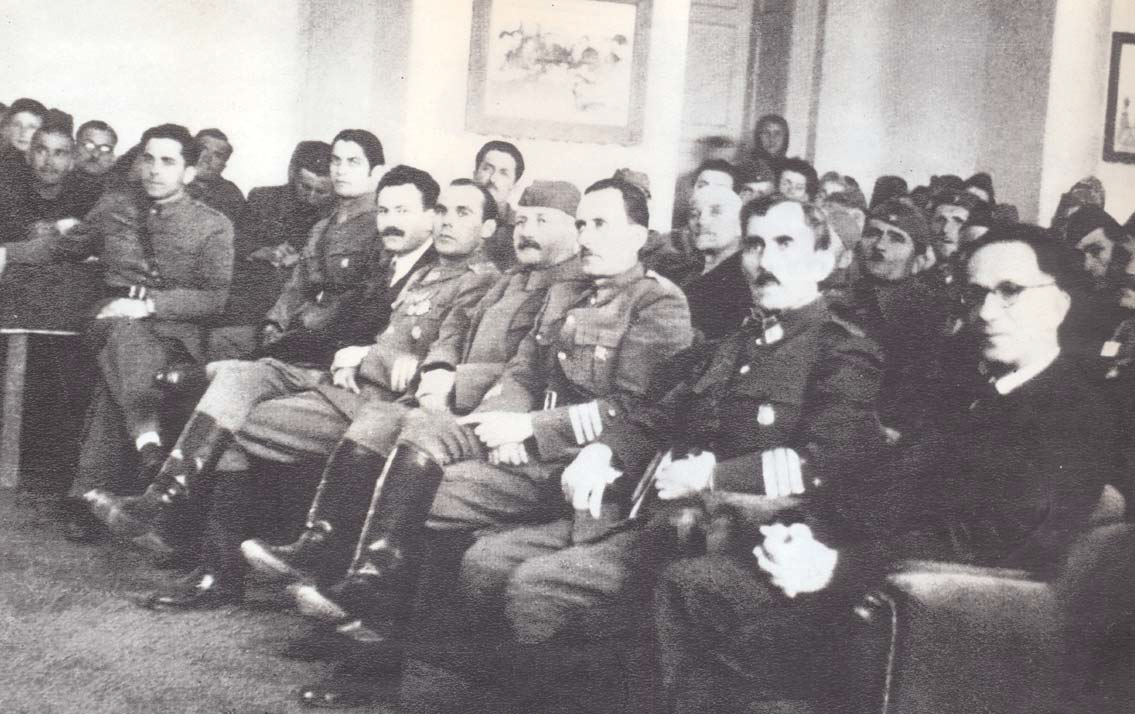
Political and military leaders at the session of CASNO on April 18, 1945.

The National Anti-Fascist Council of the Peoples Liberation of Montenegro and Boka was formed in Kolašin on 15 and 16 November 1943. On its second session on June 14, 1944, it changed its name to Montenegrin Anti-Fascist Assembly of National Liberation (CASNO) (Crnogorska Antifašistička Skupština Narodnog Oslobođenja).

During World War II it developed to be the leadership of the Socialist Republic of Montenegro. Its president was dr. Nikola "Niko" Miljanić.

In 1945 at the end of the war, it transformed to the National Parliament of Montenegro.
