= Marko Orlandić =

Montenegrin politician (1930–2019)

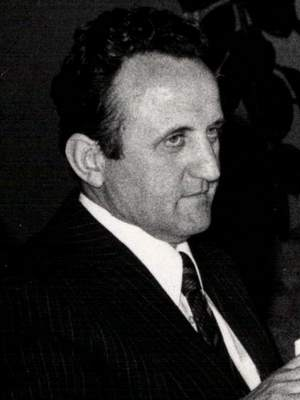
- Orlandić in 1975

10th President of the Presidency of Montenegro
- In office 7 May 1983 – 7 May 1984
- Preceded by: Veselin Đuranović
- Succeeded by: Miodrag Vlahović

7th President of the League of Communists of Montenegro
- In office 1 July 1982 – May 1984
- Preceded by: Vidoje Žarković
- Succeeded by: Miljan Radović

8th President of the Executive Council of Montenegro
- In office 6 May 1974 – 28 April 1978
- Preceded by: Žarko Bulajić
- Succeeded by: Momčilo Cemović

Personal details
- Born: 28 September 1930 Seoca, Kingdom of Yugoslavia
- Died: 20 December 2019 (aged 89) Podgorica, Montenegro
- Party: League of Communists of Yugoslavia

Marko Orlandić (Cyrillic: Марко Орландић; 28 September 1930 – 20 December 2019) was a high-ranking Montenegrin politician in the Socialist Federal Republic of Yugoslavia (SFRY) during the 1970s and '80s. He was born in Seoca, Yugoslavia (now in Montenegro).

For two terms, 1969–1971 and 1971–1974, Orlandić was a member of the Federal Executive Council of SFRY. He was the President of the Executive Council of the Socialist Republic of Montenegro from May 1974 to May 1978. From 1978 to 1982, he served as Ambassador of SFRY in Soviet Union (USSR).

He was the President of Montenegro from May 1983 to May 1984. From July 1984 to April 1986, he was the President of the Presidency of the Central Committee of the League of Communists of Montenegro and a member of the Presidency of the Central Committee of the League of Communists of Yugoslavia (LCY). In 1986, he was again elected as a member of the Presidency of the LCY. He held the post until his resignation on 1 February 1989. His resignation came after a series of demonstrations in Montenegro in the second half of 1988 and January 1989, orchestrated by the Serbian leader Slobodan Milošević and his followers. The demonstrations resulted in a collective resignation of the party and government leadership of Montenegro and Montenegrin representatives in the highest bodies of the Yugoslav government and party.

After the breakup of SFR Yugoslavia and the creation of a new Yugoslavia consisting only of Serbia and Montenegro, Orlandić promoted full independence for Montenegro. He authored three books in Serbo-Croatian: U vrtlogu (1997), U predvečerje sloma (2002), and Crnogorsko posrtanje (2005).

Orlandić died in Podgorica, Montenegro on December 20, 2019, at the age of 89.

Political offices
Preceded by Žarko Bulajić	President of the Executive Council of Montenegro; 6 May 1974–28 May 1978	Succeeded by Momčilo Cemović
Preceded by Veselin Đuranović	President of the Presidency of Montenegro; 7 May 1983–7 May 1984	Succeeded by Miodrag Vlahović
