= Žarko Bulajić =

Montenegrin politician (1922–2009)

Photo of Žarko Bulajić

Žarko Bulajić (22 July 1922 in Vilusi, Nikšić, Montenegro – 1 January 2009) was the President of the Executive Council of the Socialist Republic of Montenegro from 7 October 1969 to 6 May 1974.

| Preceded by Vidoje Žarković | President of the Executive Council of Montenegro; 7 October 1969 – 6 May 1974 | Succeeded by Marko Orlandić |
