= Momčilo Cemović =

Montenegrin politician

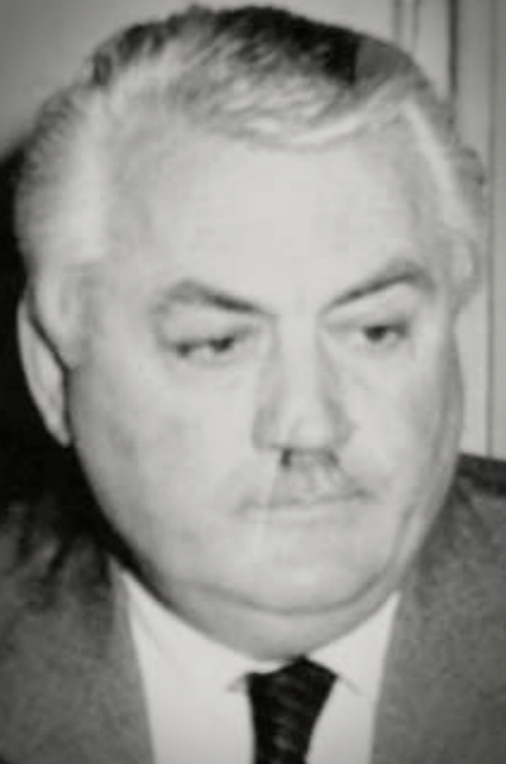
Momčilo Cemović

Momčilo Cemović (Cyrillic: Момчило Цемовић; 21 May 1928 – 27 December 2001) was a Montenegrin politician.

== Political career ==
He served as the President of the Executive Council of the Socialist Republic of Montenegro from 1978 until 1982. Cemović was a member of the League of Communists of Montenegro and League of Communists of Yugoslavia. He was also a Finance Minister of Yugoslavia from 1974 to 1978.

Preceded by Marko Orlandić	President of the Executive Council of Montenegro; 28 April 1978 – 7 May 1982	Succeeded by Radivoje Brajović
