= Karnela Scekic =

Montenegrin model

- Born: May 8, 1985 (age 41); Bijelo Polje, Montenegro
- Occupation: Model
- Years active: 2003-present
- Modeling information
- Height: 1.78 m (5 ft 10 in)
- Hair color: Blonde
- Eye color: Brown

Karnela Scekic (Serbian Cyrillic: Карнела Шћekић, born on May 8, 1985, in Bijelo Polje, Montenegro, she lives in Ulcinj) is a Montenegrin model. She was the 2008 Miss Globe Montenegro Winner, the 2008 Miss Globe Contestant; the 2009 Miss 7 Continents Contestant: 3rd Runner Up Miss 7 Continents, Miss Bikini Miss 7 Continents, Best in Figure and Face of Ararat Hall; the 2009 The Look Of The Year Contestant. Besides she still works as a model, she became a national director and manager for Miss Globe Montenegro and Balkan manager of The Look Of The Year. Karnela also works as a Correspondent, Show Presenter and Coordinator of the Miss Globe in Tirana, Albania since 2021.

== Professional career ==
When she was 16, in 2003, Karnela became a model of Elite Model Look Agency in Serbia and Montenegro and continued working many Fashion Weeks ( Verica Rakocevic, Marina Banovic Nikolic, Aleksandra Cicmil, Jelena Djukanovic, Rocco Barocco, Vuica, Kara, Anton Giulio Grande, Fahrad Re, Conti Taguali, Renato Balestra and many others). She represented Montenegro in many beauty contests: Year Face Montenegro 2007, Miss of Public 2007, Miss Adriatic Europe 2008 in Croatia, Miss Globe Montenegro 2008, Miss Globe 2008 in Tirana - Albania, Miss 7 Continents 2009 in Yerevan - Armenia, The Look Of The Year 2009 in Taormina - Sicily. After these competitions Karnela has gotten the licence to become national director and manager of the Miss Globe Montenegro (from January 1, 2010). Another licence is given by the president of The Look Of The Year Competition, Ivana Triolo. Karnela also works as a Correspondent, Show Presenter and Coordinator of the Miss Globe in Tirana, Albania since 2021.
