= Branislav Šoškić =

President of Montenegro

Branislav Šoškić (Serbian Cyrillic: Бранислав Шошкић; 19 November 1922 – 4 April 2022) was a Montenegrin politician who served as the President of the Socialist Republic of Montenegro's Presidency from 1985 to 1986. He was a member of the League of Communists of Montenegro.

== Life ==
Šoškić was born in Gusinje, Kingdom of Serbs, Croats and Slovenes, on 19 November 1922. A noted economist, he was member of the European Academy of Sciences and Arts and the Montenegrin Academy of Sciences and Arts, and served as its President from 1981 to 1985. He ultimately resided in Belgrade, Serbia.

Šoškić died on 4 April 2022, at the age of 99.

== Sources ==
- CANU biography

| Preceded by Miodrag Vlahović | President of the Presidency of Montenegro; 6 May 1985 – 6 May 1986 | Succeeded by Radivoje Brajović |
