= Paltašić family =

- Current region: Kotor, modern-day Montenegro
- Members: Jakov, Radelja, Andrija, Nikola, Mihailo, Jovan and Miloje Paltašić

The House of Paltašić was a late medieval noble family from Kotor, modern-day Montenegro.

== History ==
Their nobility is connected with Venetian take over of Kotor when several members of Paltašić family managed to gain considerable wealth and a respectable reputation.

== Andrija Paltašić ==
Andrija Paltašić was the son of Jakov Paltašić and the grandson of Radelja Paltašić. Andrija was a Venetian printer and publisher who was active from 1477 to 1499. He was born in Kotor and moved to Venice in the 1470s where he became one of the first printers. He died in Venice in ca. 1500. Paltašić is the first known South Slavic printer. Hieromonk Makarije learned printing skills from Andrija.

== Nikola and Mihailo Paltašić ==
Nikola and Mihailo Paltašić were Andrija's uncles and wealthy noble men of Kotor. Mihailo and Nikola Paltašić were among noblemen from Kotor who bought land from Bogdašić family. In 1431 Nikola made a contract to build a house in Kotor for certain Ivanko. He was also a merchant who rented boats and traded with wheat. Although there were many boats in Kotor, their rent was not always competitive, so he sometimes rented foreign boats, as he did in November 1442, when he rented a Ragusan boat to transport wheat from Lješ to Venice. Mihailo was also the owner of one large ship (Latin: navis magna).

Nikola's correspondence with Venetian authorities regarding some community issues is documented in 1454. He had a son Božo who was rector of the Kotor Gymnasium.

== Other members ==
Jovan Paltašić (in some works mentioned as Ivan) was mentioned in one document of 6 December 1440 as archdeacon in Kotor. He was described as one of the most reputable priests of Kotor bishopric. Before 1456 he visited king of Bosnia as Pope's acolyte.

In 1470 another member of Paltašić family, Miloje Paltašić, also moved to Venice.
