= Draško Šćekić =

Montenegrin Historian & Novelist

- Born: September 21, 1931 (age 95); Berane, Kingdom of Yugoslavia
- Occupations: Novelist, Historian

Draško Šćekić (Berane, Montenegro, 21 September 1931) is a Montenegrin novelist and historian.

His early education he completed in his native town and Teacher's College in Banja Luka and Travnik. He graduated from the Faculty of Political Science in Sarajevo. He entered the world of literature through the doors of anonymous book contests. His first published novels were Planina (Mountain) and Zlatne legende (Golden Legends) as well as a collection of poems for children entitled Radio kljun (Radio Beak). His book—Travels Through Montenegro—was reprinted multiple times and was translated into Russian and English. He now lives and works in Podgorica.

== Works ==
- Putujući Crnom Gorom (Traveling Through Montenegro)
- Panti ih narod i istorija
- Istorijske istine i legende o opstanku naroda srpskog
- Sorabi
- Planina
- Priće o domovini
