= Barska Stoka =

Hip-hop group from Montenegro

Barska stoka
- Also known as: Barska 100ka BR 100ka Obala smora Los Grehos
- Origin: Bar
- Genres: Rap, hip hop
- Members: Dvorska Luda; Darzee; Joe Shua Kizz; 2JNK Demolythron

Barska Stoka (English: Livestock from Bar) is a Montenegrin hip-hop group.

The current lineup of Barska Stoka is Dvorska Luda, Darzee, Joe Shua Kizz, and 2JNK Demolythron.

== Discography ==
- Stočarski manifest (2008)
- Transplantacija (2009) - with Bachi Rimu Trupa

=== Singles ===
- Fantastična četvorka (2009) - with Noyz
