= Božina Ivanović =

Montenegrin anthropologist and politician (1931 – 2002)

- Божина Ивановић

1st President of Matica crnogorska
- In office 22 May 1993 – 23 January 1999
- Preceded by: Position established
- Succeeded by: Branko Banjević

14th President of the Presidency of SR Montenegro
- In office 7 May 1988 – 13 January 1989
- Preceded by: Radivoje Brajović
- Succeeded by: Slobodan Simović (Acting); Branko Kostić

Personal details
- Born: 31 December 1931 Podgorica, Kingdom of Yugoslavia
- Died: 10 October 2002 (aged 70) Podgorica, Montenegro, FR Yugoslavia
- Party: League of Communists of Yugoslavia (SKJ)

Božina Ivanović (Montenegrin Cyrillic: Божина Ивановић; 31 December 1931 – 10 October 2002) was a Montenegrin anthropologist and politician. He served as General Secretary of the Montenegrin Academy of Sciences and Arts and President of Matica crnogorska. He was a professor at the Faculty of Science and Mathematics, University of Montenegro.

== Early life and education ==
Božina Ivanović was born on 31 December 1931 in Podgorica, where he graduated from elementary school, as well as lower and higher gymnasium. He graduated from the Higher Pedagogical School in Cetinje in 1952, studying in biology and chemistry. After that, Ivanović graduated in biology at the Faculty of Philosophy in Sarajevo in 1958. He received his doctorate in biology from the Faculty of Science in Sarajevo in 1964 and his doctorate in philosophy (in physical anthropology) from Charles University in Prague in 1974.

== Political career ==
Ivanović joined the Communist Party of Montenegro in 1949. He steadily moved up the ladder in the Montenegrin branch of League of Communists of Yugoslavia. Originally a teacher, Ivanović became Director of the Biological Institute in Titograd. From 1974 to 1982, he served as Education Secretary in SR Montenegro. He served as General Director of RTV Titograd.

From 1988 to 1989, he was the President of Presidency of SR Montenegro. He was forced out of power in January 1989 in the wake of the Anti-bureaucratic revolution.

== Later life and death ==
Following his fall from power, Ivanović became the first President of Matica crnogorska in May 1993. He was a professor at the Faculty of Science and Mathematics at the University of Montenegro.

Ivanović died on 10 October 2002 in Podgorica.

== Selected works ==
- Vuković, Tihomir; Ivanović, Božina (1971). Slatkovodne ribe Jugoslavije. Sarajevo: Zemaljski muzej BiH.
- Ivanović, Božina M. (1985). Ontogenetski razvoj i antropološke karakteristike omladine Crne Gore. Titograd: Crnogorska akademija nauka i umjetnosti.
- Ivanović, Božina M. (1987). Durmitorci – antropoekološke osobine. Titograd: Univerzitetska riječ.
- Ivanović, Božina M. (1990). Morfološke osobine jugoslovenskih naroda. Belgrade: Odeljenje za etnologiju Filozofskog fakulteta.
- Ivanović, Božina M. (1992). Dinasti Petrović-Njegoš – antropološko-kulturološki okvir. Cetinje: Citadela.
- Ivanović, Božina M. (1994). Antropomorfološke sobine Petra II Petrovića Njegoša. Podgorica: Crnogorska akademija nauka i umjetnosti.
- Ivanović, Božina M. (1996). Antropologija I – antropomorfologija. Podgorica: Unireks.
- Ivanović, Božina M. (1998). Ćipur – cetinjska nekropola i skeletna populacija. Podgorica: Univerzitet Crne Gore.
- Ivanović, Božina M. (2002). Njegoš – antropološki atlas. Podgorica: Univerzitet Crne Gore.

Preceded by Radivoje Brajović	President of the Presidency of Montenegro; 6 May 1988–13 January 1989	Succeeded by acting Slobodan Simović
