= Borislav Jovanović (writer) =

Borislav Jovanović (Montenegrin Cyrillic: Борислав Јовановић, born 1941 in Danilovgrad) is a Montenegrin writer, poet, essayist and literary critic.

During the 1990s and after Jovanović was an influential columnist for the daily newspaper Pobjeda. He championed a pleiad of young Montenegrin writers. He wrote about 200 bibliographic units.

Considered to be "the most important interpreter of recent trends in Montenegrin literary practices", Jovanović's collection of essays titled The Montenegrin literary urbanity, is today qualified even beyond Montenegro as the most quoted literary critical view of contemporary Montenegrin literature.

He was an active participant in a sharp public struggle for constitutional recognition of Montenegrin as the mother tongue of Montenegrins.

His literary works have contributed to the modern understanding of cultural and political heritage of the Montenegrins. His works on these subjects are mostly consolidated in the books "Libroskopija" (2002) and "Montenegrin literary urbanity" (2005).

A shortened version of the introductory text for the book "Montenegrin literary urbanity" was released as a preface to the book "Sons – view of contemporary Montenegrin fiction" which was published in 2006 by Antibarbarus from Zagreb, the Plima from Ulcinj and the association of Sa(n)jam knjige from Pula.

He also authored the text "New Montenegrin novel – deconstruction, personal poetics, discontinuity" which was published in the book "Voices of Montenegrin fiction: literary-historical selection and overview"(Osijek-Cetinje, 2007), co-authored by Dr. Milorad Nikčević and Dr. Jakov Sabljić, professor at Osijek University in Croatia.

Jovanović graduated from the University of Belgrade Faculty of Philology. He is a member of the Montenegrin society of independent writers and Matica crnogorska.

As a poet, Jovanović is a winner of the Ratković award, the biggest Montenegrin recognition in the field of poetry for his collection of poems "Kenotaf".

He is the author of several collections of poems for children.

== More important works ==
- "The Old Man and the stars" (1979)
- "Paths" (1983)
- "Amputation" (2001)
- "Libroskopija: Views from the modern Montenegrin literature and historiography" (2002)
- "Montenegrin literary urbanity" (2005)
- "Biblion:Montenegrin poetry of the nineties" (2006)
- "Kenotaf" (2006)
- "Spornik" (2009)
- "Capture Thanatos" (2010)
- "The White Raven" (2012)
