= Nikola Vukčević (historian) =

Montenegrin Historian (1914-1982)

Dr Nikola Vukčević (Serbian Cyrillic: др Никола Вукчевић) was a Montenegrin historian and ethnologist. He died suddenly in Belgrade on 30 January 1982, leaving his life's greatest work "The Lješanska nahija" unfinished and never published.

== Works ==
- An Appendix to the Tradition in Montenegro (Један прилог традицији у Црној Гори), Belgrade, 1971
- Some Issues in the History of Montenegro (Осврт на нека питања из историје Црне Горе), Belgrade, 1981
- A Worthy Book on the Montenegrins (Вриједна књига о Црногорцима), Cetinje, 1981
- Ethnic Origin of the Montenegrins (Етничко поријекло Црногораца), Belgrade, 1981
