= Goričani, Čačak =

Goričani Горичани
- Village
- Location within Serbia
- Coordinates: 43°47′41″N 20°31′43″E
- Country: Serbia
- District: Moravica District
- Municipality: Čačak

Area
  - Total: 7.47 km^{2} (2.88 sq mi)
- Elevation: 202 m (663 ft)

Population (2022)
  - Total: 583
  - Density: 78.0/km^{2} (202/sq mi)
- Time zone: UTC+1 (CET)
  - Summer (DST): UTC+2 (CEST)

Goričani (Serbian Cyrillic: Горичани) is a village in the municipality of Čačak, Serbia. According to the 2022 census, the village has a population of 583 people.

Historical population
Year	Pop.	±% p.a.
1948	907	—
1953	980	+1.56%
1961	974	−0.08%
1971	970	−0.04%
1981	928	−0.44%
1991	879	−0.54%
2002	780	−1.08%
2011	698	−1.23%
2022	583	−1.62%
