= Vito Nikolić =

Montenegrin journalist and poet

Vitomir Vito Nikolić Витомир Вито Николић
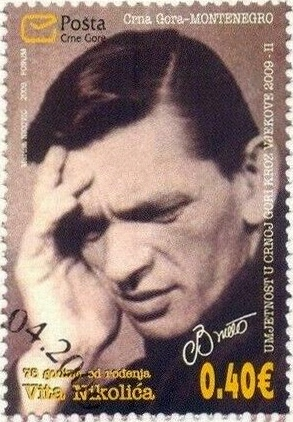
- Vito Nikolić on a 2009 stamp of Montenegro
- Born: Vitomir Nikolić; 27 April 1934; Mostar, Kingdom of Yugoslavia (now Bosnia-Herzegovina)
- Died: 10 September 1994 (aged 60); Podgorica, FR Yugoslavia (now Montenegro)
- Occupations: journalist; poet
- Writing career
- Period: 1962–1994
- Notable works: Drumovanja (1962); Sunce, hladno mi je (1968)

Signature
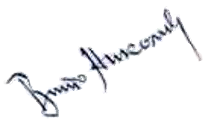

Vitomir Vito Nikolić (Montenegrin Cyrillic: Витомир Вито Николић; 27 April 1934 – 10 September 1994) was a Montenegrin journalist and poet. His work is often compared to that of Russian poet Sergey Yesenin, as he is often dubbed as "Montenegrin Yesenin", as well "The Good Spirit of Nikšić".

== Biography ==
Originally from Nikšić, he was born in 1934 in Mostar, Kingdom of Yugoslavia (now Bosnia and Herzegovina), where his father served in the army. In 1941, he returned to Nikšić with his family. After his father and brother were killed in World War II, he lived in an orphanage until he turned 18. He spent most of his life in Nikšić, living in poverty, and was well known for his bohemian lifestyle. .

== Works ==
Vito published his first two books of poetry, "Drumovanja" (Journeys) and "Sunce, hladno mi je" (Sun, I'm feeling cold) without a publisher, hence paying for the costs of their production. Although he had some conflicts with socialist Yugoslav government, the government gave him a flat in Nikšić. Afterwards, he moved from Nikšić to Titograd, where he worked as a journalist for Pobjeda, writing short stories under the title "Crnom Gorom, putem i bespućem". Some of his poems for children became notable, and are included in the literature books for elementary and high school students.

In 2002, some of Nikolić's prose writings were collected and published in a book "Dobri duh Nikšića" (The Good Spirit of Nikšić).

== Legacy ==
Following his death, a "Vito Nikolić Award" for poetry has been established in Montenegro. The award is presented annually, during the "September days", a cultural manifestation hosted by the city of Nikšić.

In 2002, Montenegrin writer and journalist Đorđe Matović with whom Vito Nikolić worked in Pobjeda, published a book of anecdotes from poet's life, titled "S Vitom na još po jednu" (Another round [of drinks] with Vito).

In elementary schools in Montenegro, students also learn the poem "Pismo mojoj učteljici" (Letter to My Teacher), which Vito dedicated to his teacher Ljubica Mučalica from Nikšić.

== Published works ==
- Drumovanja (Nikšić, 1962)
- Sunce, hladno mi je (Nikšić, 1968)
- Stihovi (Titograd, 1981)
- Stare i nove pjesme (Belgrade, 1991)
- Posljednja pjesma (Nikšić, 1994)
- Nedjelja u gradu N (Nikšić, 1997)
- Dobri duh Nikšića (Podgorica, 2002)
- Trag da nas sjeti (Podgorica, 2019)
- Drumovi će poželjet ludaka (Podgorica, 2025)
