= Matica crnogorska =

Montenegrin cultural institution

- Formation: 22 May 1993; 33 years ago
- Legal status: Cultural institution
- Headquarters: Podgorica, Montenegro
- President: Ivan Jovović
- Website: www.maticacrnogorska.me

Matica crnogorska (Montenegrin: Матица црногорска, pronounced [mâtit͡sa t͡srnǒɡorska]) is a Montenegrin cultural institution. It was founded in 1993 as a non-governmental organization which promotes Montenegrin national and cultural identity and the Montenegrin language. In 2008, the Parliament of Montenegro adopted the Law on Matica crnogorska, which gave it the status of an independent cultural institution.

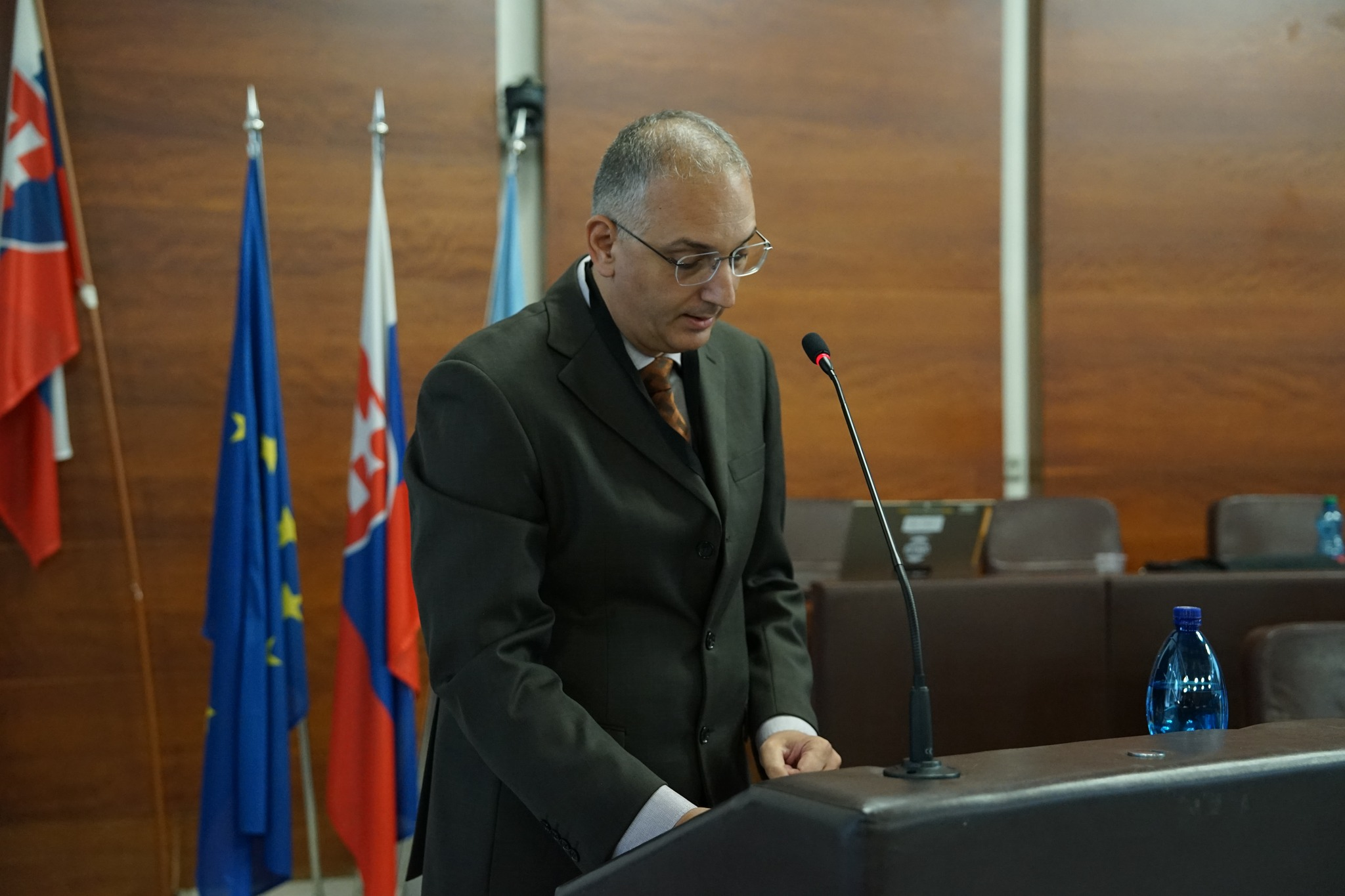
Ivan Jovović at the VI. Congress of Maticas and Institutions of Slavic Nations

In 2000, it began publishing the magazine "Matica".

== History ==
Matica crnogorska was formed on 22 May 1993 in Cetinje. The Matica was one of firm supporters of the country's independence. On 18 March 2008, the Parliament of Montenegro passed the Act of Matica crnogorska, which recognized it as an independent organization in the cultural field.

== Presidents ==
Presidents of Matica Crnogorska:

- Ivan Jovović (8 May 2023 – present)
- Dragan Radulović (22 May 2013 – 8 May 2023)
- Branko Banjević (23 January 1999 – 22 May 2013)
- Božina Ivanović (22 May 1993 – 23 January 1999)
