= Veljko Milatović =

President of Montenegro

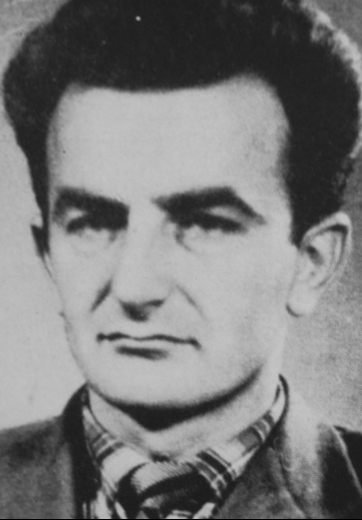
Milatović during the 1950s.

Veljko Milatović (Serbo-Croat Cyrillic: Вељко Милатовић; 5 December 1921 – 19 October 2004) was a Montenegrin Communist partisan, politician, statesman serving once as the Speaker and twice as President.

== Biography ==
Milatović was born on 5 December 1921 in Nikšić, Kingdom of Serbs, Croats and Slovenes (later Kingdom of Yugoslavia). He got the surname Milatović from his mother's side, rather than the surname from his father's side, which was Čakmak. This was due to the fact that Veljko's father (who moved to the village of Vinići near Danilovgrad after getting married) took his wife's surname for aesthetic reasons.

In 1941 when the Axis forces invaded his country, 20-year-old Veljko joined the Communist Partisans during the Anti-Fascist Struggle. He was appointed in fighting and rooting out the Nazi collaborators in the Civil War. He was a fierce opponent of the Chetniks. In 1947 he ambushed with his unit Krsto Zrnov Popović in his hideout and killed him.

In 1967 he was introduced into major political life by getting elected President of the People's Assembly of the Socialist Republic of Montenegro, with the significant structural changes in Montenegrin leadership. In 1968 he headed the 25th anniversary of the Montenegrin partisan parliament, in Kolašin. A special guest on the celebration was his acquiesce Jakov Blažević, the Speaker of the Croatian People's Assembly. In the speech that Veljko held, he claimed that Montenegro "capitulated twice in its history – in 1916 and in 1918", causing quite a quarrel in the festivity, as part of the war-time MPs spoke against considering the 1918 unification with Serbia as occupation. Milatović was personally for favoring the Latin script, rather than the Cyrillic, the dominant script in Montenegro. He held his post until 1969.

Veljko Milatović terminated the close cooperation of the Montenegrin national television with TV Belgrade and established close links with the Zagreb TV. He appointed Momir Šljukić to take over the new TV station's directive. A noticeable thing was the applied Croaticization of the speech, and the commercials for the Montenegrin world were originally made in Croatia.

In 1974 he was appointed President of the Montenegrin Presidency. The same year he became one of the key people within the Commission for Njegoš's Monument, designated to design a Museum for Petar II Petrović-Njegoš which was about to be built in the place of his Chapel raised by Danilo that was to be destroyed, despite his personal promises to the Serbian Orthodox Church's Metropolitanate of Montenegro and the Littoral that no such move shall be taken as long as he's alive. This move was found particularly controversial by the pro-Serbian elements in Montenegro, as Njegoš's Chapel was seen as a symbol to the Serbdom of Montenegro: according to them, it signified Serbian-Montenegrin friendship and was the supreme national symbol of Montenegro and the Montenegrins, actually depicted on the official Emblem (Coat of Arms) of Communist Montenegro. However, Milatović made an arrangement with the SOC that it can hold memorial service in the new museum.

On 31 January 1981 on a special session of the Commission of the Presidency of the Central Committee of the League of Communists of Montenegro, he held his long work, a "strategic initiative". Veljko did not consider the Montenegrins as Serbs. He explained that there was a constant indoctrination of the Montenegrins in the past 100 years that they were Serbs, but that that pro-Serbian ideology was defeated with the demise of the Yugoslav Army in the Fatherland during and after the Second World War. He defined that that Montenegrin history is full of false beliefs and that a mass critic correction is required. He supposed searching for non-Serbian assistance to conduct such purification of the historical science and defined that the actions to de-Serbify the Montenegrins must be taken in three points: historiography, ethnology and linguistics. His proposal was criticized especially among Serbian nationalists, who considered Montenegrins as a Serb group during World War II.

The same year Veljko Milatović was a participant in the discussion about Špiro Kulišić's controversial work "On the Ethnogenesis of the Montenegrins", which defined the uniqueness of the Montenegrin people, in the Montenegrin Communist League's Marxist Center. He defended the work and attacked the center's head Nenad Bućin for organizing a discussion in the first place, stating that it immediately questions the validity of the work. In the actual discussion Veljko refused to comment Špiro's work itself, but highly criticized its critics, calling them intolerant.

On 12 June 1981, Veljko Milatović opened his report in the Montenegrin Academy of Sciences and Arts, to celebrate the 40th anniversary of 13 July Uprising, defining the growing special links between Montenegro and Albania and how they are becoming closer. Upon the discussions regarding the terror over the Montenegrins and the growth of anti-Yugoslav irredentist rhetoric, Veljko responded that a calm attitude must be pertained above all else, as he is planning to open the question of the status of the Montenegrin national minority in the Socialist People's Republic of Albania.

He died on 19 October 2004 in Herceg Novi, Serbia and Montenegro.

Preceded by Andrija Mugoša	President of the People's Assembly of Montenegro; 5 May 1967 – 6 October 1969	Succeeded by Vidoje Žarković
Preceded by Budislav Šoškić (as President of the People's Assembly of Montenegro)	President of the Presidency of Montenegro; 5 April 1974 – 7 May 1982	Succeeded by Veselin Đuranović
