= Radivoje Brajović =

President of Montenegro

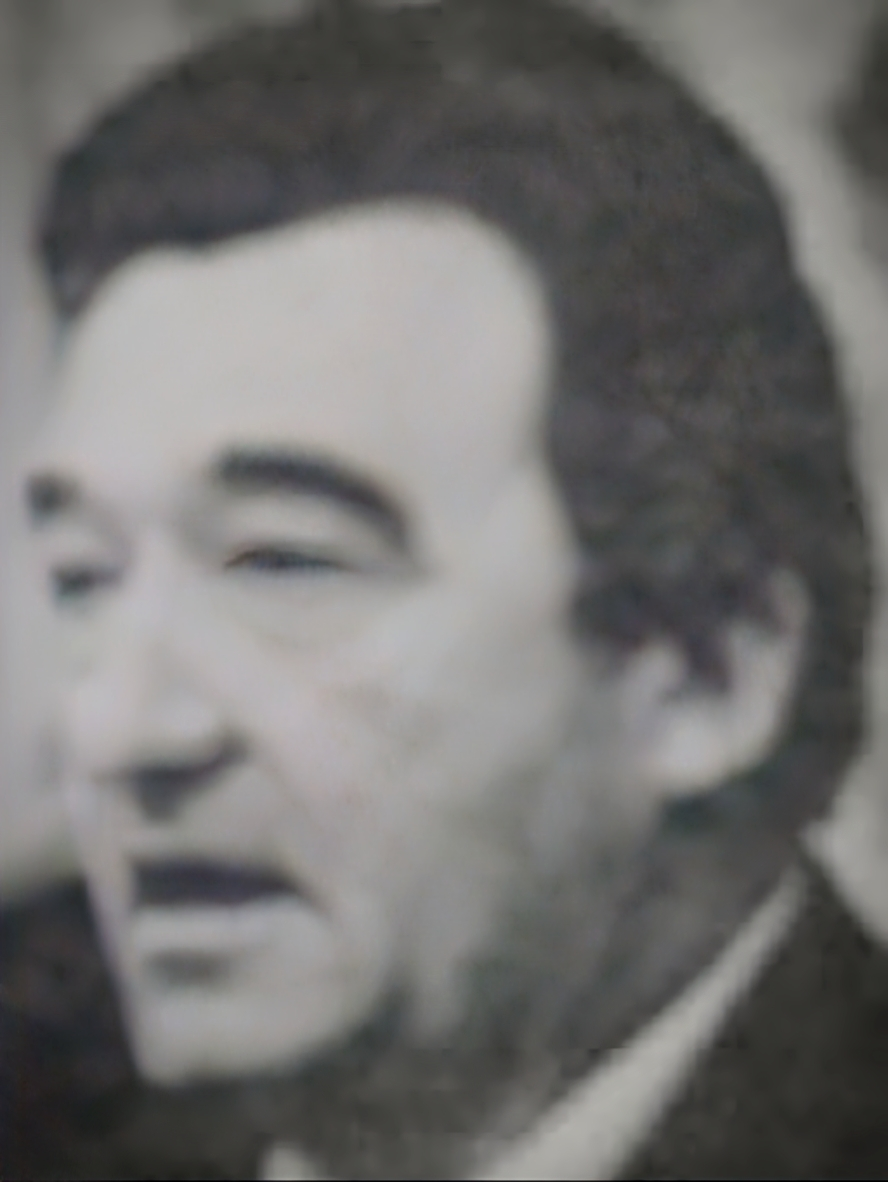
Brajović in 1969

Radivoje Brajović (Cyrillic: Радивоје Брајовић; born 11 January 1935) was the President of the Presidency of the Socialist Republic of Montenegro from May 1986 to May 1988 and the President of its Executive Council in 1982–1986. He was a member of the League of Communists of Montenegro and the League of Communists of Yugoslavia.

In October 1988 Brajović announced his resignation from the collective leadership of Montenegro after the Anti-bureaucratic revolution organised by Slobodan Milošević.

Preceded by Momčilo Cemović	President of the Executive Council of SR Montenegro; 7 May 1982–6 June 1986	Succeeded by Vuko Vukadinović
Preceded by Branislav Šoškić	President of the Presidency of Montenegro; 6 May 1986–6 May 1988	Succeeded by Božina Ivanović
