= Dragan Radulović =

Montenegrin writer

Dragan Radulović (27 August 1969 in Cetinje) is a Montenegrin writer, literary reviewer and essayist. He graduated with a degree in philosophy from the University of Belgrade Faculty of Philosophy. Currently, he writes essays and literary reviews for various Montenegrin periodicals, dailies and weeklies. He published the collection of short stories Petrifikacija in (2001) in which he explored the subversive potentials of different genres (horror, science fiction, detective).

His next book was a novel entitled Auschwitz Cafe, first published in Montenegro in 2003 and afterwards in Croatia, in 2006 in which the author extends his interest in different genres (from political thriller to cyberpunk) while the major motivational focus is based on a true event occurred during the war in the ex-Yugoslavia when the Bosnian Muslim passengers were singled out from the Beograd-Bar train and killed at Štrpci station.

The next book is a catalogue entitled Vitezovi ništavila: Đavo u tranzicionom Disneylandu (2005), a collection of short texts ideated by mixing the story, essay and newspaper text.

His next book, a collection of seven stories entitled Splav Meduze / The Raft of the Medusa was published in Croatia (2007) by publishing house "Antibarbarus" Zagreb, Croatia.

Dragan Radulović lives in Budva where he teaches philosophy at the Secondary School Danilo Kiš.
