= Milo Petrović-Njegoš =

Milo Petrović-Njegoš (Cyrillic: Мило Петровић-Његош; 3 October 1889 – 22 November 1978) was a prince of Montenegro. He was a direct descendant of Radul Petrović, brother of Vladika Danilo I.

== Biography ==
Prince Milo was born in Njeguši on 3 October 1889 to Đuro Petrović-Njegoš and his wife, Stane-Cane Đurašković. During World War I, he was the commander of the Lovćen Brigade. Prince Milo left Montenegro in 1919 and continued for more than a half century all around the world to struggle for Montenegrin rights and renewal of Montenegrin statehood. He married Helena Grace Smith in Santa Barbara, California, U.S., on 3 September 1927. On 23 October 1928, his only child, Milena was born in Los Angeles, United States. He left his family the following year and settled in London. He later moved to Dublin, Ireland where he owned an antiques shop. Later in his life, he moved to Connemara, County Galway.

He died in Barringtons Hospital, Limerick on 22 November 1978. He is buried in the graveyard of St Mary's Cathedral, Limerick.

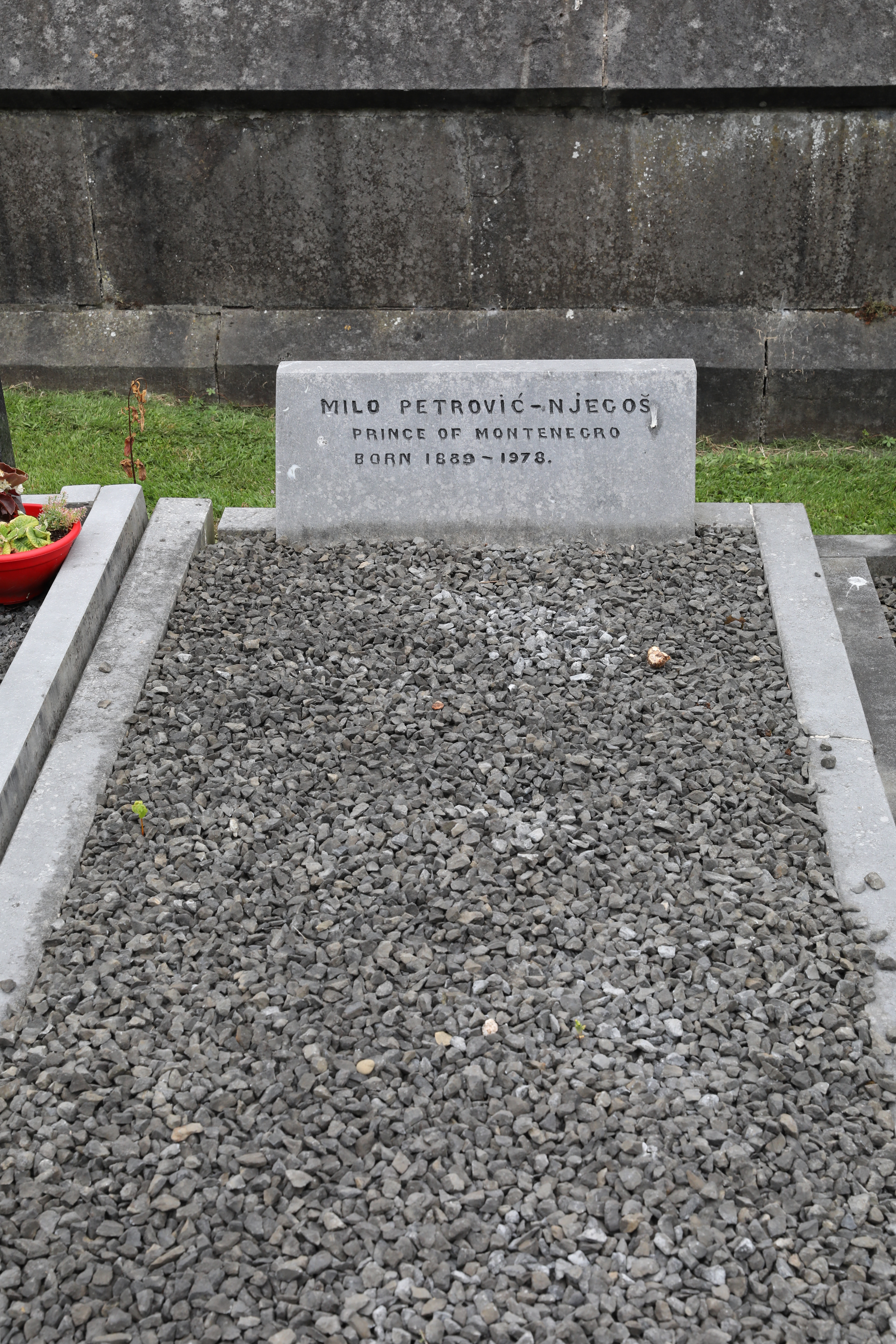
Grave of Milo Petrovic Njegos, St Mary's Cathedral, Limerick, Ireland
