= Niko Miljanić =

Montenegrin and Serbian anatomist and surgeon

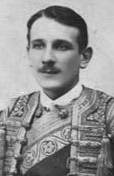
Miljanić during the 1920s

Dr. Nikola "Niko" Miljanić (Serbian Cyrillic: Никола "Нико" Миљанић; 1892 – 20 October 1957) was a Montenegrin and Serbian anatomist and surgeon, professor of anatomy at Belgrade Medical School, resistance participant during World War II and the president of Montenegrin wartime Assembly.

He was one of the founders of the Belgrade Medical School, which is today part of the University of Belgrade, and has held the first lecture on the newly formed school on December 12, 1920. He has been a full professor of anatomy during the period 1920—1934, then held lectures on surgery propaedeutics from 1935 until 1947. He was relieved from the faculty in 1954. Professor Miljanić was the author of the first textbooks of anatomy in Serbian, a monograph on asepsis, as well as a lot of scientific articles on anatomy and surgery in different journals in Yugoslavia and abroad. As a French ex-pupil he was elected president of the French ex-pupils Association and the founder of the bilingual Serbian-French journal Anali medicine i hirurgije (Annals of Medicine and Surgery), published 1927-1934.

In 1930, he unveiled the Monument of Gratitude to France in Belgrade's Kalemegdan Park, together with King Alexander I of Yugoslavia. He fought in both Balkan Wars and both World Wars. Miljanić was a member of the French Academy of Surgeons and was decorated with the order of the Légion d'honneur.

Miljanić participated in the World War II in Yugoslavia as Partisan since 1942. He was a member of the Anti-Fascist Council of the National Liberation of Yugoslavia (AVNOJ), President of the State Anti-fascist Council for the National Liberation of Montenegro and Boka (ZAVNOCG), from 15 November 1943 to 14 July 1944, and President of the Montenegrin Anti-Fascist Assembly of National Liberation (CASNO), from 14 July 1944 until 21 November 1946.

In 1940, Miljanić adopted 17-year old Svetozar Gligorić, following the death of Gligorić's parents. Gligorić would later become chess grandmaster and one of the most successful chess players in the world in the 1950s and 1960s.

He died on October 20, 1957, in Mexico while attending the International Congress of Surgeons.
