= Vidoje Žarković =

Montenegrin communist politician

- Видоје Жарковић
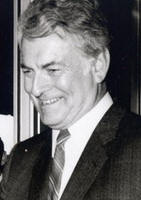
- Žarković in 1969

President of the Presidency of the Central Committee of the League of Communists of Yugoslavia
- In office 25 June 1985 – 28 June 1986
- Preceded by: Ali Sukrija
- Succeeded by: Milanko Renovica

President of the People's Assembly of the Socialist Republic of Montenegro
- In office 6 October 1969 – 1 April 1974
- Prime Minister: Gojko Ubiparip
- Preceded by: Veljko Milatović
- Succeeded by: Budislav Šoškić

President of the Executive Council of the Socialist Republic of Montenegro
- In office 5 May 1967 – 7 October 1969
- Preceded by: Mijuško Šibalić
- Succeeded by: Žarko Bulajić

Personal details
- Born: 10 June 1927 Plužine, Kingdom of Serbs, Croats and Slovenes
- Died: 29 September 2000 (aged 73) Belgrade, FR Yugoslavia
- Party: Montenegrin branch of the League of Communists of Yugoslavia
- Occupation: Politician

Vidoje Žarković (10 June 1927 – 29 September 2000) was a communist politician from the Socialist Republic of Montenegro.

== Biography ==
He was a chairman of the Executive Council of Montenegro (1967–1969), president of the People's Assembly of Montenegro (1969–1974), member of the Presidency of SFR Yugoslavia (1979–1984), secretary of the Central Committee of the League of Communists of Montenegro (1984), and president of SFR Yugoslavia (1985–1986).

Political offices
Preceded by Mijuško Šibalić	President of the Executive Council of Montenegro; 5 May 1967–7 October 1969	Succeeded by Žarko Bulajić
Preceded by Veljko Milatović	President of the People's Assembly of Montenegro; 6 October 1969–April 1974	Succeeded by Budislav Šoškić
