= Aleksandar Bečanović =

Montenegrin writer

Aleksandar Bečanović (born 1971 in Nikšić, Montenegro) is a Montenegrin poet, translator and a critic of literature and film. He has contributed to the Montenegrin weekly Monitor in its culture section. He is now a part of the cultural magazines Plima and Ars. He is well known for his fanatical love towards the horror movies. He lists Howard Hawks as one of his favorite directors.

Bečanović received the Risto Ratković award for best book of poetry in Montenegro in 2002. He also translates material, mostly film theory, from English. He lives in Bar.

At the 2006 Pula Festival of Books and Authors in Croatia, Bečanović was one of the representative writers who presented on Montenegrin poetry.

Bečanović won the 2017 European Union Prize for Literature, for the country of Montenegro, for his novel Arcueil (2015).

== Published works ==
- "All the Scrupulousness"; "Carmilla: Gothic Poem"; "Nothing Discernable"; "Pesoa: On Four Addresses"; "All Apologies: God Bless America", ARS No.4 year 2003
- Ulisova daljina, 1994
- Jeste, pjesme, 1996
- Ostava, pjesme, 1998
- Mjesta u pismu, pjesme, 2001
- Očekujem što će iz svega proizaći, 2005
- Žanr u savremenom filmu, 2005
- Arcueil, 2015

== Anthologies ==
- New European poets, St. Paul, Minn.: Graywolf Press, 2008. ISBN 978-1-55597-492-3
