= Goričani, Montenegro =

Goričani Горичани
- Village
- Location within Montenegro
- Country: Montenegro
- Municipality: Podgorica

Population (2003)
  - Total: 1,205
- Time zone: UTC+1 (CET)
  - Summer (DST): UTC+2 (CEST)

Goričani (Montenegrin: Горичани, pronounced [ɡǒritʃani]) is a village in the new Zeta Municipality of Montenegro. Until 2022, it was part of Podgorica Municipality.

== History ==
=== Ottoman Empire ===
In period between 15th and 17th century there were two villages Goričani, one on the left and one on the right bank of river Morača. In 1485 the village on the left bank was recorded in the Ottoman defter as timar with 10 households. The village on the right bank belonged to Ivan Crnojević until Ottomans captured his realm too. This village on the right bank of the river was expanded through immigration and its name was gradually changed to Vukovci.

== Demographics ==
According to the 2003 census, the village has a population of 1,205 people.

According to the 2011 census, its population was 1,462.

Ethnicity in 2011
Ethnicity	Number	Percentage
Montenegrins	970	66.3%
Serbs	381	26.1%
other/undeclared	111	7.6%
Total	1,462	100%
