= Miodrag Vlahović (politician, born 1924) =

President of Montenegro (1924–2006)

Miodrag Mišo Vlahović (Cyrillic: Миодраг Мишо Влаховић; 1924–2006) was a politician from Montenegro who served as President of the Presidency of the Socialist Republic of Montenegro (within the Socialist Federal Republic of Yugoslavia) from May 1984 to May 1985. He was a member of the League of Communists of Montenegro.

Preceded by Marko Orlandić	President of the Presidency of Montenegro; 7 May 1984–7 May 1985	Succeeded by Branislav Šoškić
