= Demographics of Montenegro =

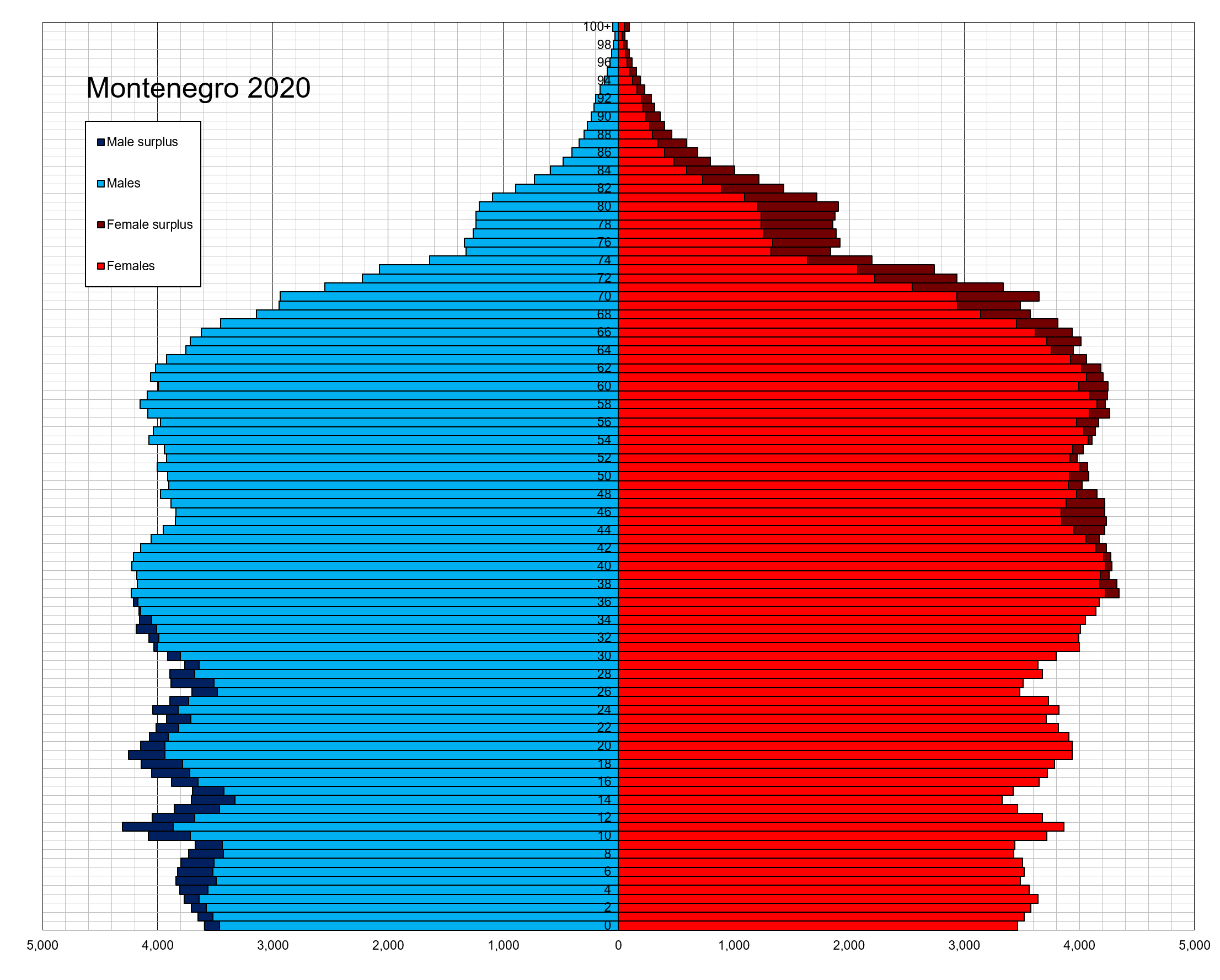
- Population pyramid of Montenegro in 2020
- Population: 626,211 (August 2026)
- Growth rate: +0.05% (2023 census)
- Birth rate: 11.19 births/1,000 population (2022 est.)
- Death rate: 10.33 deaths/1,000 population (2022 est.)
- Life expectancy: 77.75 years
  - male: 75.32 years
  - female: 80.27 years (2022 est.)
- Fertility rate: 1.81 children born/woman (2022 est.)
- Infant mortality: 3.24 deaths/1,000 live births
- Net migration rate: -4.97 migrant(s)/1,000 population (2022 est.)
- Immigrant share: 14.4% (2024)

Age structure
- 0–14 years: 18.14%
- 65 and over: 16.02%

Sex ratio
- Total: 0.97 male(s)/female (2022 est.)
- At birth: 1.04 male(s)/female
- Under 15: 1.07 male(s)/female
- 65 and over: 0.69 male(s)/female

Nationality
- Nationality: Montenegrin
- Major ethnic: Montenegrin (41.12%)
- Minor ethnic: Serb (32.93%)

Language
- Official: Montenegrin (34.52%)
- Spoken: Serbian (43.18%)

Census population and growth rate
Year	Pop.	±% p.a.
1921	311,341	—
1931	360,044	+1.46%
1948	377,189	+0.27%
1953	419,873	+2.17%
1961	471,894	+1.47%
1971	529,604	+1.16%
1981	584,310	+0.99%
1991	615,035	+0.51%
2003	620,145	+0.07%
2011	620,029	−0.00%
2023	623,633	+0.05%

Demographic features of the population of Montenegro include population density, ethnicity, education level, health of the populace, economic status, religious affiliations and other aspects.

== Population size and structure ==
=== Population censuses ===
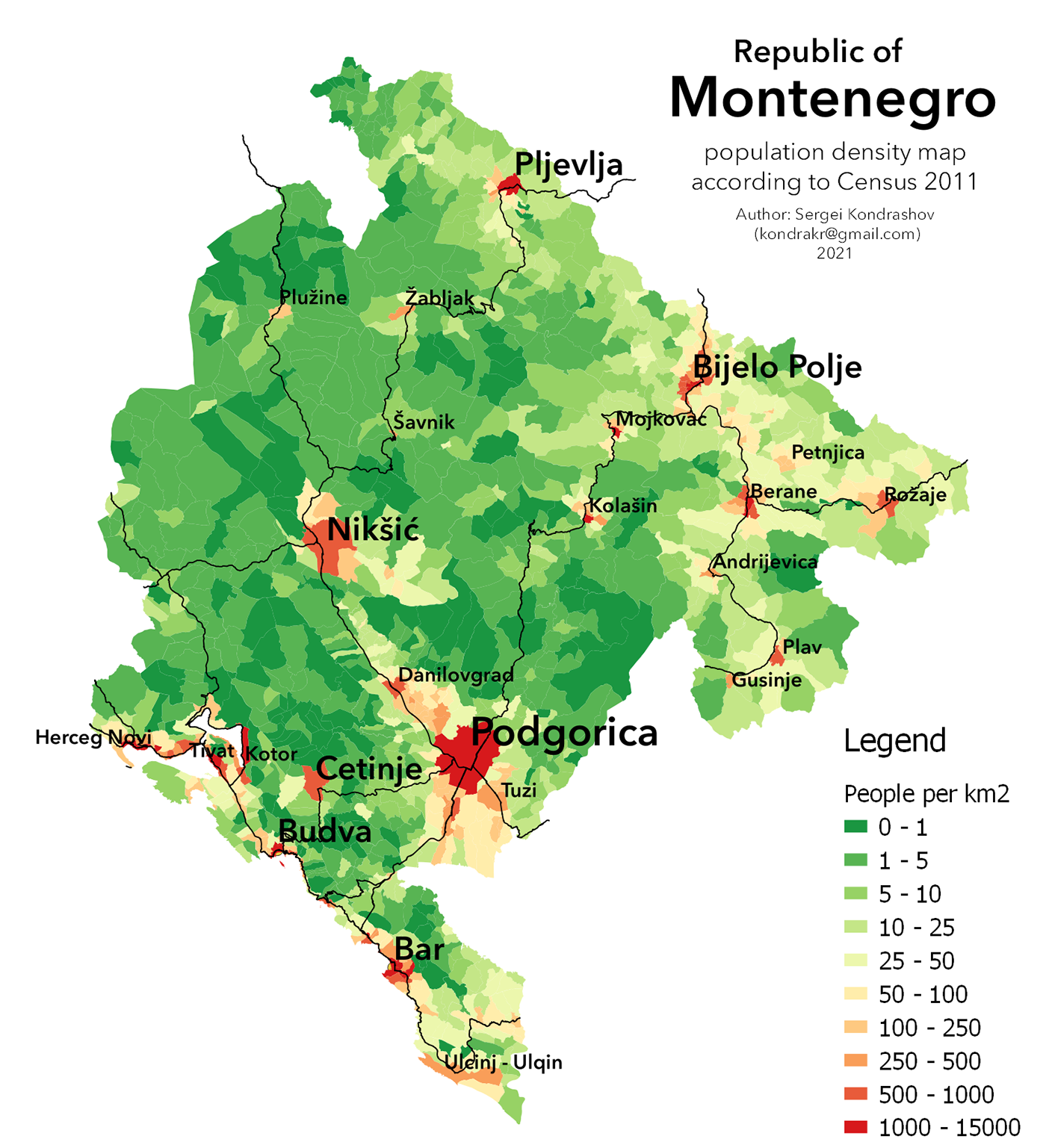

The population of Montenegro is 626,211 as of August 23, 2026.

Census date	Total population	Population by age group				Population density (per km^{2})
Census date	Total population	0–14 years	15–64 years	65 years or older	Unknown	Population density (per km^{2})
1921	311,341	117,315 (37.7%)	175,207 (56.3%)	18,791 (6.0%)	28 (0.0%)	22.5
1931	360,044	131,538 (36.5%)	205,818 (57.2%)	22,651 (6.3%)	37 (0.0%)	26.1
1948	377,189	144,345 (38.3%)	205,063 (54.4%)	27,767 (7.4%)	14 (0.0%)	27.3
1953	419,873	149,144 (35.5%)	239,781 (57.1%)	30,930 (7.4%)	18 (0.0%)	30.4
1961	471,894	171,657 (36.4%)	266,515 (56.5%)	33,452 (7.1%)	270 (0.1%)	34.2
1971	529,604	169,139 (31.9%)	317,417 (59.9%)	40,417 (7.6%)	2,631 (0.5%)	38.3
1981	584,310	160,547 (27.5%)	373,404 (63.9%)	48,021 (8.2%)	2,338 (0.4%)	42.3
1991	615,035	155,458 (25.3%)	402,754 (65.5%)	50,603 (8.2%)	6,220 (1.0%)	44.5
2003	620,145	127,461 (20.6%)	412,982 (66.6%)	74,160 (12.0%)	5,542 (0.9%)	44.9
2011	620,029	118,751 (19.2%)	421,693 (68.0%)	79,337 (12.8%)	248 (0.0%)	44.9
2023	623,633	112,444 (18.0%)	406,181 (65.1%)	105,008 (16.8%)	0 (0.0%)	44.9

Intermediate estimates of the population of Montenegro by the Statistical Office of Montenegro
Year of estimate	Population	Ref
2015	622,159	
2016	622,303	
2017	622,373	
2018	622,227	
2019	622,028	

=== Structure of the population ===
Population by Sex and Age Group (Census 01.IV.2011):

Age group	Male	Female	Total	%
Total	306 236	313 793	620 029	100
0–4	20 361	18 589	38 950	6.28
5–9	20 016	18 414	38 430	6.20
10–14	21 389	19 982	41 371	6.67
15–19	22 815	21 278	44 093	7.11
20–24	22 084	20 732	42 816	6.91
25–29	23 299	22 494	45 793	7.39
30–34	22 188	22 307	44 495	7.18
35–39	20 523	21 356	41 879	6.75
40–44	20 136	20 360	40 496	6.53
45–49	21 401	21 688	43 089	6.95
50–54	21 817	21 796	43 613	7.03
55–59	20 509	20 714	41 223	6.65
60–64	15 941	18 255	34 196	5.52
65–69	9 774	12 347	22 121	3.57
70–74	10 909	14 232	25 141	4.05
75–79	7 251	9 933	17 184	2.77
80–84	4 050	5 971	10 021	1.62
85–89	1 324	2 415	3 739	0.60
90–94	283	602	885	0.14
95–99	61	141	202	0.03
100+	13	31	44	0.01
Age group	Male	Female	Total	Percent
0–14	61 766	56 985	118 751	19.15
15–64	210 713	210 980	421 693	68.01
65+	33 665	45 672	79 337	12.80
unknown	92	156	248	0.04

Population Estimates by Sex and Age Group (01.I.2021) (Data refer to usual resident population.):

Age group	Male	Female	Total	%
Total	306 864	313 875	620 739	100
0–4	18 882	17 595	36 477	5.88
5–9	18 843	17 309	36 152	5.82
10–14	20 149	18 389	38 538	6.21
15–19	20 223	18 669	38 892	6.27
20–24	20 061	18 773	38 834	6.26
25–29	20 412	19 112	39 524	6.37
30–34	21 937	20 714	42 651	6.87
35–39	23 218	22 474	45 692	7.36
40–44	21 499	21 929	43 428	7.00
45–49	19 972	20 960	40 932	6.59
50–54	19 305	20 068	39 373	6.34
55–59	20 059	21 057	41 116	6.62
60–64	19 531	20 839	40 370	6.50
65–69	17 070	19 262	36 332	5.85
70–74	11 774	15 328	27 102	4.37
75–79	5 599	8 597	14 196	2.29
80–84	5 023	7 902	12 925	2.08
85–89	2 197	3 440	5 637	0.91
90–94	871	1 119	1 990	0.32
95–99	192	249	441	0.07
100–104	44	90	134	0.02
105–109	3	0	3	<0.01
Age group	Male	Female	Total	Percent
0–14	57 874	53 293	111 167	17.91
15–64	206 217	204 595	410 812	66.18
65+	42 773	55 987	98 760	15.91

== Vital statistics ==
Source: Statistical Office of Montenegro

Year	Average population	Live births	Deaths	Natural change	Crude birth rate (per 1000)	Crude death rate (per 1000)	Natural change (per 1000)	Total fertility rate	Female fertile population (15–49 years)
1950	397,001	11,904	3,682	8,222	30.0	9.3	20.7	4.25	96,666
1951	407,001	12,898	4,416	8,482	31.7	10.9	20.8	4.52	98,818
1952	415,998	13,308	3,859	9,449	32.0	9.3	22.7	4.55	100,970
1953	422,037	13,880	4,775	9,105	32.9	11.3	21.6	4.50	103,122
1954	428,001	14,428	3,862	10,566	33.7	9.0	24.7	4.48	106,325
1955	435,003	13,550	3,935	9,615	31.1	9.0	22.1	4.05	109,526
1956	440,998	13,654	3,871	9,783	31.0	8.8	22.2	3.90	112,728
1957	446,999	13,751	4,172	9,579	30.8	9.3	21.4	3.80	114,825
1958	453,001	13,684	3,537	10,147	30.2	7.8	22.4	3.68	116,170
1959	460,001	12,614	3,469	9,145	27.4	7.5	19.9	3.43	113,294
1960	467,002	13,127	3,583	9,544	28.1	7.7	20.4	3.58	112,441
1961	473,409	12,994	3,335	9,659	27.4	7.0	20.4	3.54	111,590
1962	482,758	13,006	3,747	9,259	26.9	7.8	19.2	3.33	116,271
1963	492,113	12,982	3,454	9,528	26.4	7.0	19.4	3.26	118,519
1964	501,379	12,599	3,550	9,049	25.1	7.1	18.0	3.15	121,230
1965	510,260	12,333	3,431	8,902	24.2	6.7	17.4	3.12	122,378
1966	520,000	12,209	3,199	9,010	23.5	6.2	17.3	3.06	125,718
1967	527,507	11,486	3,385	8,101	21.8	6.4	15.4	2.83	129,437
1968	534,792	11,027	3,429	7,598	20.6	6.4	14.2	2.65	134,670
1969	520,484	11,259	3,325	7,934	21.6	6.4	15.2	2.67	137,450
1970	525,002	10,636	3,516	7,120	20.3	6.7	13.6	2.47	140,852
1971	530,854	10,866	3,264	7,602	20.5	6.1	14.3	2.71	134,967
1972	538,997	10,938	3,512	7,426	20.3	6.5	13.8	2.61	139,772
1973	545,254	10,665	3,304	7,361	19.6	6.1	13.5	2.49	142,576
1974	551,996	10,551	3,199	7,352	19.1	5.8	13.3	2.40	145,104
1975	557,995	10,557	3,279	7,278	18.9	5.9	13.0	2.34	147,571
1976	567,996	10,711	3,465	7,246	18.9	6.1	12.8	2.30	150,832
1977	575,269	10,738	3,559	7,179	18.7	6.2	12.5	2.26	153,702
1978	581,958	10,584	3,660	6,924	18.2	6.3	11.9	2.18	155,604
1979	588,997	10,365	3,826	6,539	17.6	6.5	11.1	2.12	155,338
1980	579,382	10,542	3,703	6,839	18.2	6.4	11.8	2.15	155,072
1981	586,029	10,335	3,680	6,655	17.6	6.3	11.4	2.24	151,056
1982	592,900	10,579	3,618	6,961	17.8	6.1	11.7	2.23	153,072
1983	599,358	10,657	4,194	6,463	17.8	7.0	10.8	2.16	155,008
1984	605,924	10,521	3,915	6,606	17.4	6.5	10.9	2.10	155,795
1985	606,839	10,724	3,926	6,798	17.7	6.5	11.2	2.12	156,436
1986	607,711	10,455	3,922	6,533	17.2	6.5	10.8	2.04	158,026
1987	608,144	10,567	3,990	6,577	17.4	6.6	10.8	2.04	159,914
1988	605,000	10,190	3,661	6,529	16.8	6.1	10.8	1.95	163,892
1989	601,000	9,634	3,833	5,801	16.0	6.4	9.7	1.85	162,362
1990	597,000	9,380	3,936	5,444	15.7	6.6	9.1	1.79	164,450
1991	591,843	9,609	3,975	5,634	16.2	6.7	9.5	2.07	150,676
1992	594,000	9,524	4,393	5,131	16.0	7.4	8.6	2.07	150,859
1993	596,000	8,922	4,471	4,451	15.0	7.5	7.5	1.95	151,042
1994	599,000	8,887	4,660	4,227	14.8	7.8	7.1	1.96	151,226
1995	601,000	9,492	4,931	4,561	15.8	8.2	7.6	2.11	151,408
1996	604,464	9,094	4,982	4,112	15.0	8.2	6.8	2.04	151,592
1997	606,759	8,758	5,153	3,605	14.4	8.5	5.9	1.98	151,774
1998	609,054	9,211	5,312	3,899	15.1	8.7	6.4	2.10	151,958
1999	606,677	8,828	5,393	3,435	14.6	8.9	5.7	2.03	152,142
2000	604,950	9,184	5,412	3,772	15.2	8.9	6.2	2.13	152,325
2001	607,389	8,839	5,431	3,408	14.6	8.9	5.6	2.04	152,997
2002	609,828	8,499	5,513	2,986	13.9	9.0	4.9	1.95	153,623
2003	612,267	8,344	5,704	2,640	13.6	9.3	4.3	1.91	154,117
2004	613,353	7,849	5,707	2,142	12.8	9.3	3.5	1.80	154,048
2005	614,261	7,352	5,839	1,513	12.0	9.5	2.5	1.69	153,298
2006	615,025	7,531	5,968	1,563	12.2	9.7	2.5	1.73	152,881
2007	615,875	7,834	5,979	1,855	12.7	9.7	3.0	1.79	152,728
2008	616,969	8,258	5,708	2,550	13.4	9.3	4.1	1.88	152,163
2009	618,294	8,642	5,862	2,780	14.0	9.5	4.5	1.98	151,446
2010	619,428	7,418	5,633	1,785	12.0	9.1	2.9	1.70	150,802
2011	620,345	7,215	5,847	1,368	11.6	9.4	2.2	1.65	150,151
2012	621,418	7,459	5,922	1,537	12.0	9.5	2.5	1.72	149,577
2013	622,587	7,475	5,917	1,558	12.0	9.5	2.5	1.73	148,861
2014	623,744	7,529	6,014	1,515	12.1	9.6	2.4	1.75	148,122
2015	624,651	7,386	6,329	1,057	11.8	10.1	1.7	1.73	147,472
2016	625,353	7,569	6,464	1,105	12.1	10.3	1.8	1.78	146,925
2017	625,982	7,432	6,523	909	11.9	10.4	1.5	1.77	146,385
2018	626,438	7,264	6,504	760	11.6	10.4	1.2	1.75	145,865
2019	626,753	7,223	6,595	628	11.5	10.5	1.0	1.75	145,177
2020	626,590	7,097	7,293	-196	11.3	11.6	-0.3	1.74	144,331
2021	625,053	7,033	9,152	-2,119	11.3	14.6	-3.4	1.74	143,417
2022	623,591	7,021	7,068	-47	11.3	11.3	-0.1	1.75	142,419
2023	623,529	7,008	6,327	681	11.2	10.1	1.1	1.75	142,008
2024	623,525	6,977	6,329	648	11.2	10.2	1.0	1.75	141,634
2025	623,115	6,925	6,413	512	11.1	10.3	0.8	1.77	140,636

=== Current vital statistics ===
Period	Live births	Deaths	Natural increase
January—August 2025	4,532	4,270	+262
January—August 2026	4,584	4,162	+422
Difference	▲ +52 (+1.1%)	▼ –108 (-2.6%)	▲ +160

=== Marriages and divorces ===
	Average population	Marriages	Divorces	Crude marriage rate (per 1000)	Crude divorce rate (per 1000)	Divorces per 1000 marriages
1950	397,001	3,185	284	8.0	0.7	89.2
1951	407,001	3,284	187	8.1	0.5	56.9
1952	415,998	3,585	187	8.6	0.4	52.2
1953	422,037	3,867	250	9.2	0.6	64.6
1954	428,001	3,855	252	9.0	0.6	65.4
1955	435,003	3,420	192	7.9	0.4	56.1
1956	440,998	3,524	281	8.0	0.6	79.7
1957	446,999	3,785	311	8.5	0.7	82.2
1958	453,001	3,627	359	8.0	0.8	99.0
1959	460,001	3,376	349	7.3	0.8	103.4
1960	467,002	3,387	399	7.3	0.9	117.8
1961	473,409	3,510	382	7.4	0.8	108.8
1962	482,758	3,735	327	7.7	0.7	87.6
1963	492,113	3,581	346	7.3	0.7	96.6
1964	501,379	3,694	275	7.4	0.5	74.4
1965	510,260	3,788	412	7.4	0.8	108.8
1966	520,000	3,619	402	7.0	0.8	111.1
1967	527,507	3,489	328	6.6	0.6	94.0
1968	534,792	3,643	336	6.8	0.6	92.2
1969	520,484	3,805	274	7.3	0.5	72.0
1970	525,002	4,101	313	7.8	0.6	76.3
1971	530,854	4,155	275	7.8	0.5	66.2
1972	538,997	4,034	245	7.5	0.5	60.7
1973	545,254	3,937	377	7.2	0.7	95.8
1974	551,996	4,040	296	7.3	0.5	73.3
1975	557,995	4,276	268	7.7	0.5	62.7
1976	567,996	4,156	207	7.3	0.4	49.8
1977	575,269	4,475	406	7.8	0.7	90.7
1978	581,958	4,328	234	7.4	0.4	54.1
1979	588,997	4,410	205	7.5	0.3	46.5
1980	579,382	4,429	259	7.6	0.4	58.5
1981	586,029	4,595	283	7.8	0.5	61.6
1982	592,900	4,804	312	8.1	0.5	64.9
1983	599,358	4,288	303	7.2	0.5	70.7
1984	605,924	4,379	356	7.2	0.6	81.3
1985	606,839	4,405	388	7.3	0.6	88.1
1986	607,711	4,193	373	6.9	0.6	89.0
1987	608,144	4,358	289	7.2	0.5	66.3
1988	605,000	4,081	380	6.7	0.6	93.1
1989	601,000	4,022	413	6.7	0.7	102.7
1990	597,000	3,853	324	6.5	0.5	84.1
1991	591,843	3,817	388	6.4	0.7	101.7
1992	594,000	4,041	369	6.8	0.6	91.3
1993	596,000	3,873	354	6.5	0.6	91.4
1994	599,000	3,753	348	6.3	0.6	92.7
1995	601,000	3,791	393	6.3	0.7	103.7
1996	604,464	3,770	477	6.2	0.8	126.5
1997	606,759	3,993	569	6.6	0.9	142.5
1998	609,054	3,628	569	6.0	0.9	156.8
1999	606,677	3,912	462	6.4	0.8	118.1
2000	604,950	3,866	435	6.4	0.7	112.5
2001	607,389	3,893	492	6.4	0.8	126.4
2002	609,828	3,794	506	6.2	0.8	133.4
2003	612,267	4,050	494	6.6	0.8	122.0
2004	613,353	3,440	505	5.6	0.8	146.8
2005	614,261	3,291	499	5.4	0.8	151.6
2006	615,025	3,462	470	5.6	0.8	135.8
2007	615,875	4,005	463	6.5	0.8	115.6
2008	616,969	3,445	460	5.6	0.7	133.5
2009	618,294	3,829	456	6.2	0.7	119.1
2010	619,428	3,675	520	5.9	0.8	141.5
2011	620,079	3,528	471	5.7	0.8	133.5
2012	620,601	3,305	515	5.3	0.8	155.8
2013	621,207	3,847	499	6.2	0.8	129.7
2014	621,810	3,527	584	5.7	0.9	165.6
2015	622,159	3,837	577	6.2	0.9	150.4
2016	622,303	3,178	703	5.1	1.1	221.2
2017	622,373	3,272	765	5.3	1.2	233.8
2018	622,227	3,321	849	5.3	1.4	255.6
2019	622,028	3,523	841	5.7	1.4	238.7

View source data.

Life expectancy in Montenegro since 1950

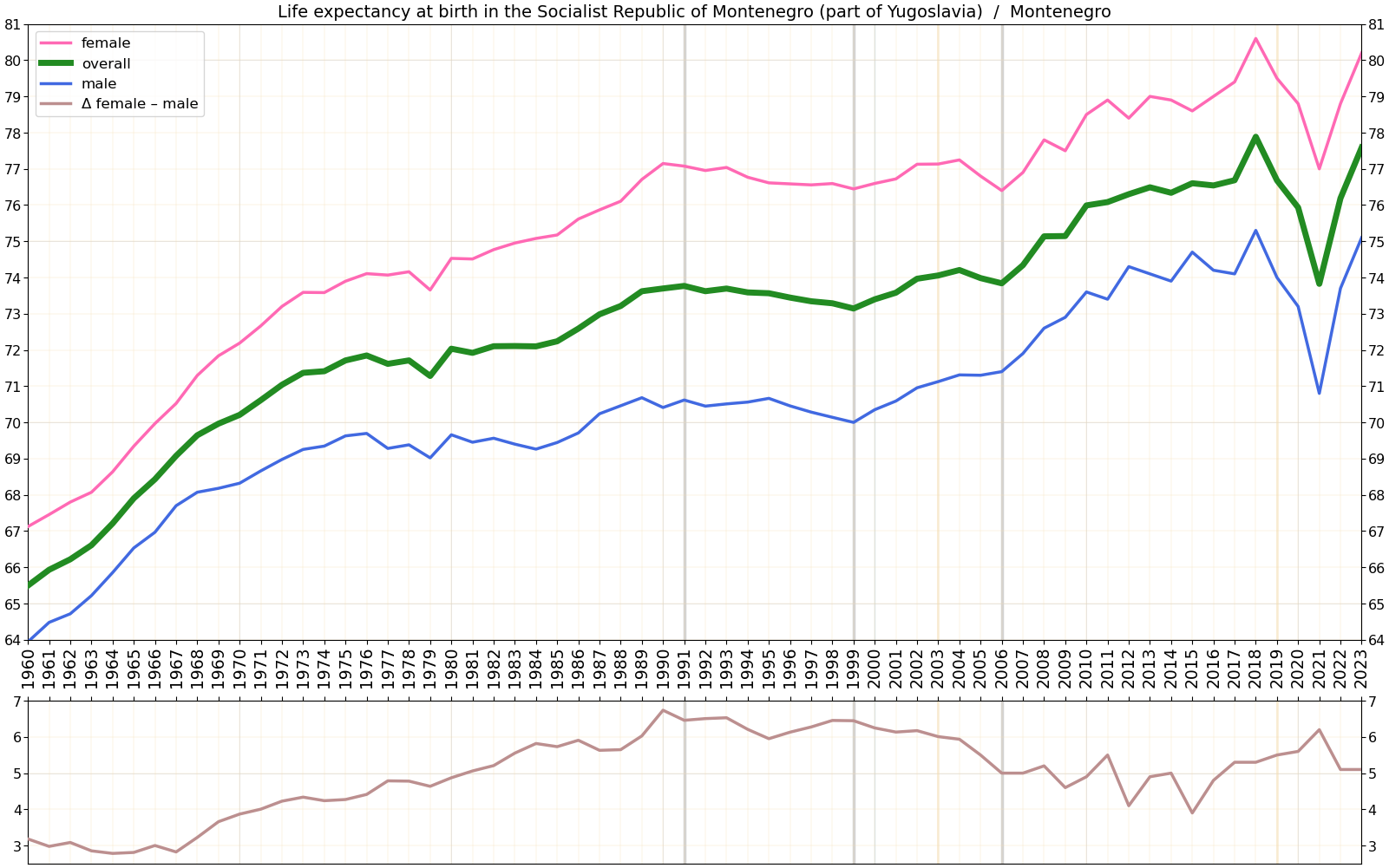
Life expectancy in Montenegro since 1960 by gender

== Nationality/Ethnicity ==
=== Ethnic population 1909–2023^{1} ===
The vast majority (over 90%) of the population of Montenegro is of Slavic origin. Albanians make up 5 percent of the population (4.9% at the 2023 census), while there is also a small Romani minority (total 0.9% at the 2023 census). The Slavic population of Montenegro uses a large diversity in ethnic identities to describe their ethnicity. The 1909 official census of Principality of Montenegro - total 317.856 inhabitants During the first decades after WW II most Slavic people identified themselves as Montenegrins, with less than 2% Serbs and less than 2% Croats in 1948. During the last decades of the existence of Yugoslavia up to 5% of the population declared themselves Yugoslavs (South-Slavs). During and after the Yugoslav Wars the ethnic identity of the Serbs (and in general the political influence of Serbia) became increasingly important in Montenegro and at the 2003 census almost one third of the population identified themselves as Serbs. The Serbs live mostly along the borders with Bosnia and Serbia, while the Montenegrins live in the center of the country. The Slavic population are in majority Eastern Orthodox Christians, but there is also a large Muslim minority, unlike in Bosnia and Herzegovina, where the majority identify as Muslim.

Ethnic group	census 1948		census 1953		census 1961		census 1971		census 1981		census 1991		census 2003		census 2011		census 2023	
Ethnic group	Number	%	Number	%	Number	%	Number	%	Number	%	Number	%	Number	%	Number	%	Number	%
Montenegrins	342,009	90.7	363,686	86.6	383,988	81.4	355,632	67.2	400,488	68.5	380,647	61.9	267,669	43.2	278,865	45.0	256,436	41.1
Serbs	6,707	1.8	13,864	3.3	14,087	3.0	39,512	7.5	19,407	3.3	57,453	9.3	198,414	32.0	178,110	28.7	205,370	32.9
Muslims	387	0.1	6,424	1.5	30,665	6.5	70,236	13.3	78,080	13.4	89,614	14.6	24,625	4.0	20,537	3.3	10,162	1.6
Bosniaks	387	0.1	6,424	1.5	30,665	6.5	70,236	13.3	78,080	13.4	89,614	14.6	48,184	7.8	53,605	8.6	58,956	9.5
Albanians	19,425	5.1	23,460	5.6	25,803	5.5	35,671	6.7	37,735	6.5	40,415	6.6	31,163	5.0	30,439	4.9	30,978	5.0
Russians													240	0.0	946	0.2	12,824	2.1
Romani	162	0.0	230	0.1	183	0.0	396	0.1	1,471	0.3	3,282	0.5	2,601	0.4	6,251	1.0	5,629	0.9
Croats	6,808	1.8	9,814	2.3	10,664	2.3	9,192	1.7	6,904	1.2	6,244	1.0	6,811	1.1	6,021	0.9	5,150	0.8
Yugoslavs					1,559	0.3	10,943	2.1	31,243	5.3	26,159	4.3	1,860	0.3	1,154	0.2	1,632	0.3
Macedonians	133	0.0	362	0.1	593	0.1	723	0.1	875	0.1	1,072	0.2	819	0.1	900	0.1	834	0.1
Others^{1}	1,558	0.4	2,033	0.5	4,352	0.9	7,299	1.4	4,639	0.8	2,129	0.3	10,853	1.8	13,408	2.2	17,755	2.9
Undeclared^{2}	1,558	0.4	2,033	0.5	4,352	0.9	7,299	1.4	3,468	0.6	8,020	1.3	26,906	4.3	30,170	4.9	17,907	2.9
Total	377,189		419,873		471,894		529,604		584,310		615,035		620,145		620,029		623,633	
^{1}:including regional affiliations^{2}: including the categories of "no response" and "unknown" Sources:

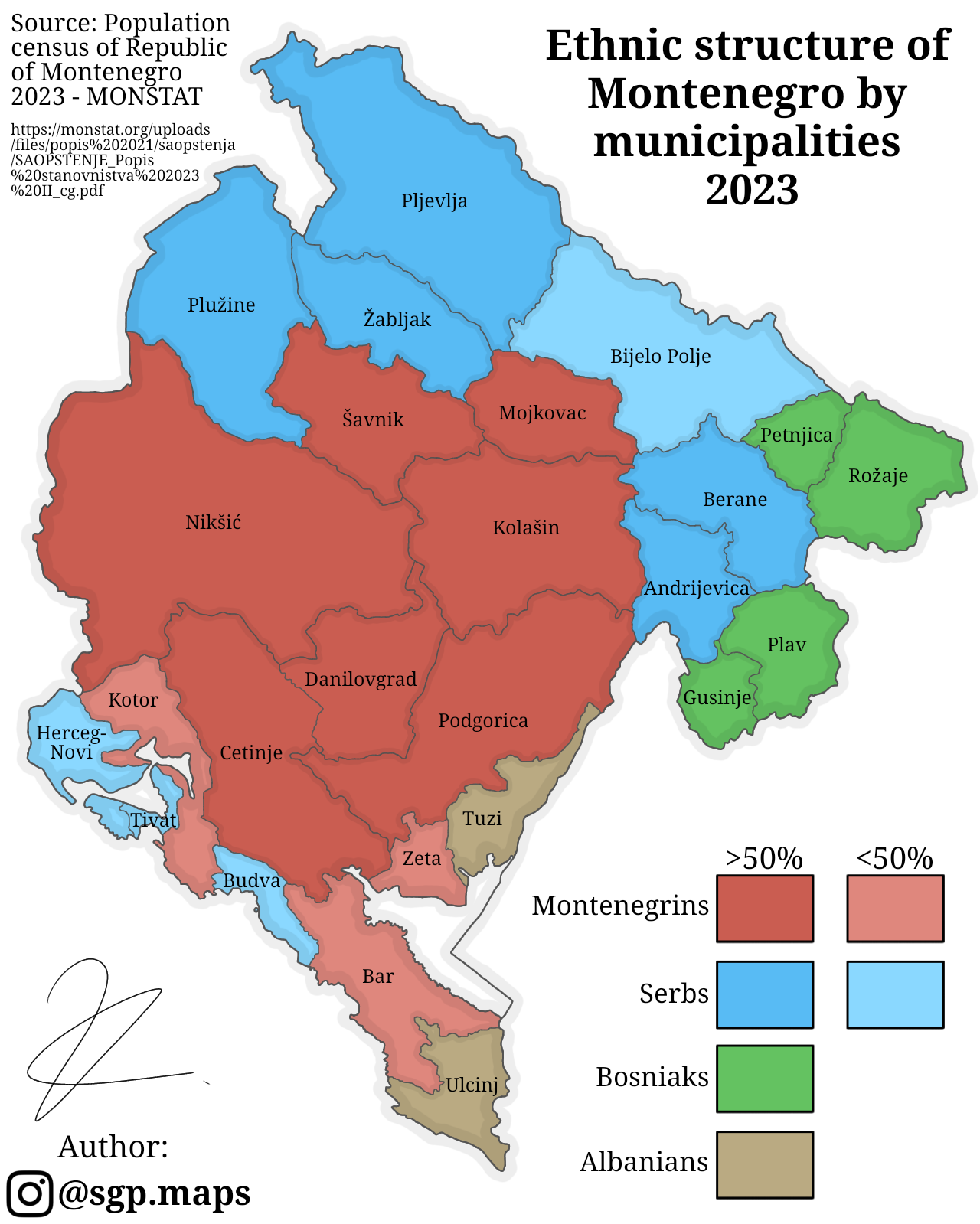
Ethnic structure of Montenegro by municipalities 2023

=== Ethnic structure by region ===
According to the 2011 census Source: Statistical Office of Montenegro

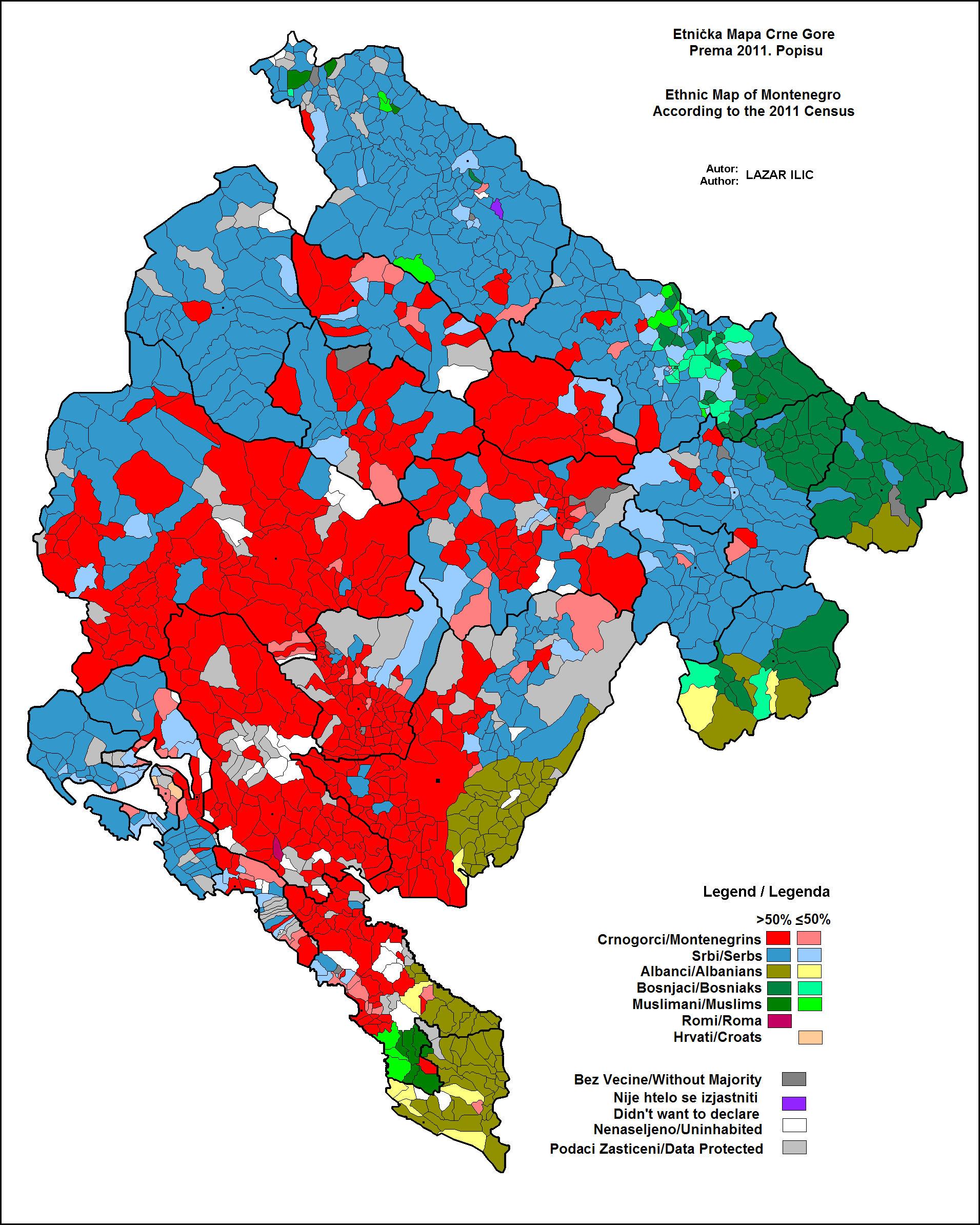
Ethnic structure of Montenegro by settlements, 2011

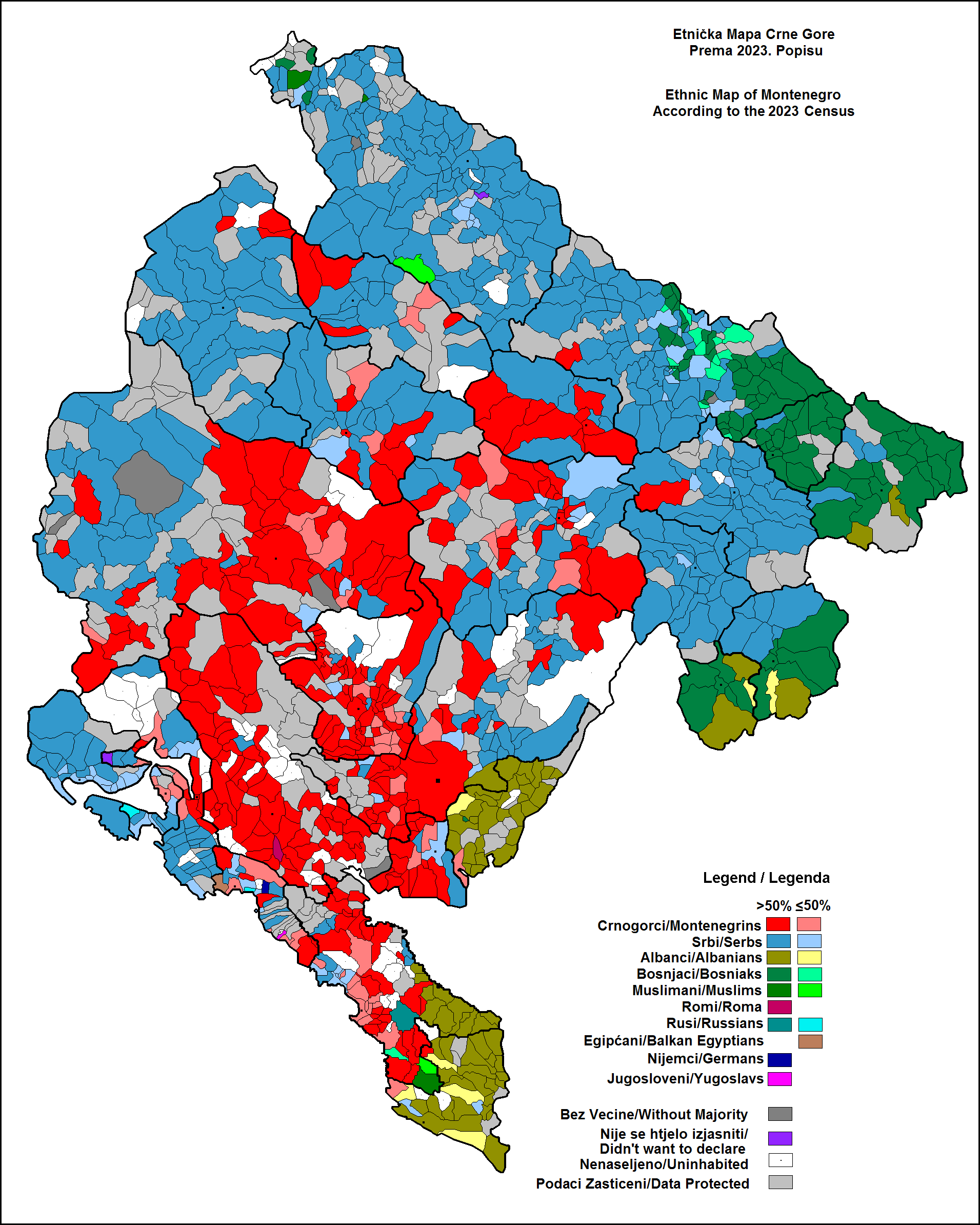
Ethnic structure of Montenegro according to the 2023 census.

Municipality	Total	Montenegrins		Serbs		Bosniaks		Muslims		Albanians		Roma		Croats		Egyptians		Does not want to declare		Other		Regional qualification		Yugoslavs		Muslims-Montenegrins		Gorani		Montenegrins-Muslims		Turkish		Serbs-Montenegrins		Montenegrins-Serbs		Russians		Macedonians		Slovenians		Hungarians		Germans		Ukrainians	
Municipality	Total	No.	%	No.	%	No.	%	No.	%	No.	%	No.	%	No.	%	No.	%	No.	%	No.	%	No.	%	No.	%	No.	%	No.	%	No.	%	No.	%	No.	%	No.	%	No.	%	No.	%	No.	%	No.	%	No.	%	No.	%
Montenegro total	623.633	256.436	41.12%	205.370	32.93%	58.956	9.45%	10.162	1.63%	30.978	4.97%	5.629	0.9%	5.150	0.83%	1.655	0.27%	17.907	2.88%	1.090	0.17%	1.086	0.17%	1.632	0.26%	217	0.03%	280	0.04%	294	0.05%	1.816	0.3%	1.701	0.2%	1.268	0.2%	12.824	2.06%	834	0.1%	264	0.04%	230	0.04%	313	0.05%	3.087	0.5%
Andrijevica	3.910	1.119	28.62%	2.640	67.52%	-	-	-	-	-	-	-	-	-	-	-	-	105	2.69%	-	-	-	-	-	-	-	-	-	-	-	-	-	-	12	0.3%	-	-	-	-	-	-	-	-	-	-	-	-	-	-
Bar	45.812	19.361	42.26%	11.968	26.12%	3.901	8.52%	1.565	3.42%	1.919	4.19%	158	0.3%	266	0.6%	-	-	1.478	3.23%	77	0.17%	17	0.04%	134	0.29%	42	0.09%	22	0.05%	61	0.13%	116	0.2%	87	0.2%	59	0.1%	2.733	5.97%	80	0.17%	-	-	24	0.05%	88	0.2%	924	2.02%
Berane	24.645	6.548	26.57%	14.742	59.82%	1.103	4.48%	532	2.16%	28	0.11%	542	2.2%	27	0.11%	243	0.99%	556	2.26%	38	0.15%	-	-	28	0.11%	15	0.06%	32	0.13%	13	0.05%	-	-	73	0.3%	30	0.12%	-	-	17	0.07%	-	-	-	-	-	-	-	-
Bijelo Polje	38.662	5.751	14.88%	16.675	43.13%	12.315	31.85%	2.916	7.54%	55	0.14%	134	0.35%	29	0.08%	-	-	288	0.74%	67	0.17%	-	-	21	0.05%	42	0.11%	-	-	60	0.16%	15	0.04%	81	0.2%	69	0.18%	19	0.05%	10	0.03%	-	-	-	-	-	-	-	-
Budva	27.445	9.774	35.61%	9.822	35.79%	140	0.51%	46	0.17%	108	0.39%	16	0.06%	144	0.52%	190	0.69%	966	3.51%	46	0.17%	82	0.3%	103	0.38%	-	-	10	0.04%	-	-	345	1.26%	66	0.24%	54	0.2%	3.738	13.62%	63	0.23%	17	0.06%	20	0.07%	43	0.16%	1.029	3.75%
Cetinje	14.494	13.199	91.07%	698	4.82%	-	-	-	-	28	0.19%	66	0.46%	38	0.26%	-	-	177	1.23%	-	-	-	-	19	0.13%	-	-	13	0.09%	-	-	-	-	-	-	11	0.08%	118	0.81%	13	0.09%	-	-	-	-	-	-	16	0.11%
Danilovgrad	18.617	10.670	57.31%	6.589	35.39%	11	0.06%	63	0.34%	63	0.34%	44	0.24%	38	0.2%	-	-	642	3.44%	21	0.11%	15	0.08%	51	0.27%	-	-	-	-	-	-	26	0.14%	71	0.38%	42	0.23%	93	0.5%	36	0.19%	-	-	11	0.06%	22	0.12%	17	0.09%
Herceg Novi	30.824	9.175	29.77%	14.901	48.34%	76	0.25%	86	0.28%	63	0.2%	269	0.87%	511	1.66%	-	-	1.996	6.48%	47	0.15%	328	1.07%	215	0.7%	11	0.04%	-	-	-	-	54	0.18%	129	0.42%	72	0.23%	1.930	6.26%	82	0.27%	31	0.1%	31	0.1%	29	0.09%	321	1.04%
Kolašin	6.700	3.489	52.07%	2.821	42.10%	-	-	-	-	-	-	-	-	-	-	-	-	208	3.1%	16	0.24%	-	-	20	0.3%	-	-	-	-	-	-	-	-	33	0.49%	21	0.31%	24	0.36%	-	-	-	-	-	-	-	-	-	-
Kotor	22.746	10.562	46.43%	7.989	35.12%	56	0.25%	26	0.11%	58	0.25%	11	0.05%	1.304	5.73%	12	0.05%	1.204	5.29%	42	0.18%	236	1.04%	150	0.66%	-	-	-	-	-	-	41	0.18%	62	0.27%	35	0.15%	482	2.12%	65	0.29%	24	0.11%	29	0.13%	12	0.05%	118	0.52%
Mojkovac	6.728	3.634	54.01%	2.804	41.68%	13	0.19%	-	-	-	-	11	0.16%	-	-	-	-	161	2.39%	-	-	-	-	18	0.27%	-	-	-	-	-	-	-	-	38	0.56%	13	0.19%	-	-	-	-	-	-	-	-	-	-	-	-
Nikšić	65.705	39.067	59.46%	22.270	33.89%	125	0.19%	190	0.29%	45	0.07%	418	0.64%	110	0.17%	462	0.7%	2.047	3.13%	91	0.14%	35	0.05%	159	0.24%	-	-	13	0.02%	-	-	-	-	271	0.41%	142	0.22%	47	0.07%	55	0.08%	16	0.02%	-	-	-	-	-	-
Plav	9.050	372	4.11%	1.546	17.08%	5.940	65.64%	236	2.61%	853	9.43%	-	-	-	-	-	-	48	0.53%	-	-	-	-	-	-	-	-	-	-	-	-	-	-	14	0.15%	-	-	-	-	-	-	-	-	-	-	-	-	-	-
Pljevlja	24.134	4.378	18.14%	16.027	66.41%	1.765	7.31%	797	3.3%	-	-	50	0.21%	11	0.05%	-	-	691	2.86%	104	0.43%	-	-	37	0.15%	38	0.16%	-	-	23	0.1%	-	-	99	0.41%	34	0.14%	-	-	11	0.05%	-	-	-	-	-	-	-	-
Plužine	2.177	480	22.05%	1.621	74.46%	-	-	-	-	-	-	-	-	-	-	-	-	51	2.34%	-	-	-	-	-	-	-	-	-	-	-	-	-	-	-	-	-	-	-	-	-	-	-	-	-	-	-	-	-	-
Podgorica	179.505	97.894	54.54%	55.365	30.84%	4.697	2.62%	1.559	0.87%	1.780	0.99%	3.431	1.91%	622	0.35%	528	0.29%	5.349	2.98%	404	0.23%	211	0.12%	519	0.29%	51	0.03%	126	0.07%	61	0.03%	956	0.53%	506	0.28%	513	0.29%	2.629	1.46%	301	0.17%	97	0.05%	57	0.03%	52	0.03%	439	0.24%
Rožaje	23.184	868	3.74%	593	2.56%	19.627	84.66%	738	3.18%	1.176	5.07%	-	-	-	-	-	-	84	0.36%	10	0.04%	-	-	10	0.04%	-	-	23	0.1%	16	0.07%	-	-	-	-	-	-	-	-	-	-	-	-	-	-	-	-	-	-
Šavnik	1.569	793	50.54%	735	46.85%	-	-	-	-	-	-	-	-	-	-	-	-	17	1.08%	-	-	-	-	-	-	-	-	-	-	-	-	-	-	-	-	-	-	-	-	-	-	-	-	-	-	-	-	-	-
Tivat	16.338	5.354	32.77%	5.631	34.47%	189	1.16%	95	0.58%	164	1.0%	52	0.32%	1.963	12.01%	187	1.14%	706	4.31%	47	0.29%	114	0.69%	81	0.5%	-	-	-	-	-	-	178	1.09%	35	0.21%	28	0.17%	880	5.39%	56	0.34%	39	0.24%	27	0.17%	23	0.14%	166	1.02%
Ulcinj	20.507	2.435	11.87%	1.025	5.0%	797	3.89%	330	1.61%	15.078	73.53%	259	1.26%	39	0.19%	-	-	216	1.05%	-	-	-	-	20	0.1%	-	-	-	-	14	0.07%	17	0.08%	12	0.06%	12	0.06%	63	0.31%	10	0.05%	-	-	-	-	16	0.08%	13	0.06%
Žabljak	2.941	1.248	42.43%	1.548	52.64%	-	-	-	-	-	-	-	-	-	-	-	-	88	2.99%	-	-	-	-	-	-	-	-	-	-	-	-	-	-	-	-	-	-	-	-	-	-	-	-	-	-	-	-	10	0.34%
Gusinje	3.933	61	1.55%	109	2.77%	2.247	57.13%	127	3.23%	1.352	34.38%	-	-	-	-	-	-	10	0.25%	11	0.28%	-	-	-	-	-	-	11	0.28%	-	-	-	-	-	-	-	-	-	-	-	-	-	-	-	-	-	-	-	-
Petnjica	4.957	235	4.74%	47	0.95%	4.162	83.96%	461	9.3%	-	-	14	0.28%	-	-	-	-	-	-	-	-	-	-	-	-	-	-	-	-	-	-	-	-	-	-	-	-	-	-	-	-	-	-	-	-	-	-	-	-
Tuzi	12.979	1.964	15.13%	258	1.99%	1.772	13.65%	363	2.8%	8.119	62.55%	118	0.91%	-	-	11	0.08%	206	1.59%	11	0.08%	-	-	-	-	-	-	-	-	31	0.24%	27	0.21%	-	-	-	-	-	-	-	-	-	-	-	-	-	-	-	-
Zeta	16.071	8.005	49.81%	6.946	43.22%	14	0.09%	-	-	72	0.45%	36	0.22%	20	0.12%	-	-	604	3.76%	24	0.15%	17	0.11%	26	0.16%	-	-	-	-	-	-	-	-	80	0.5%	106	0.66%	31	0.19%	24	0.15%	-	-	-	-	-	-	-	-

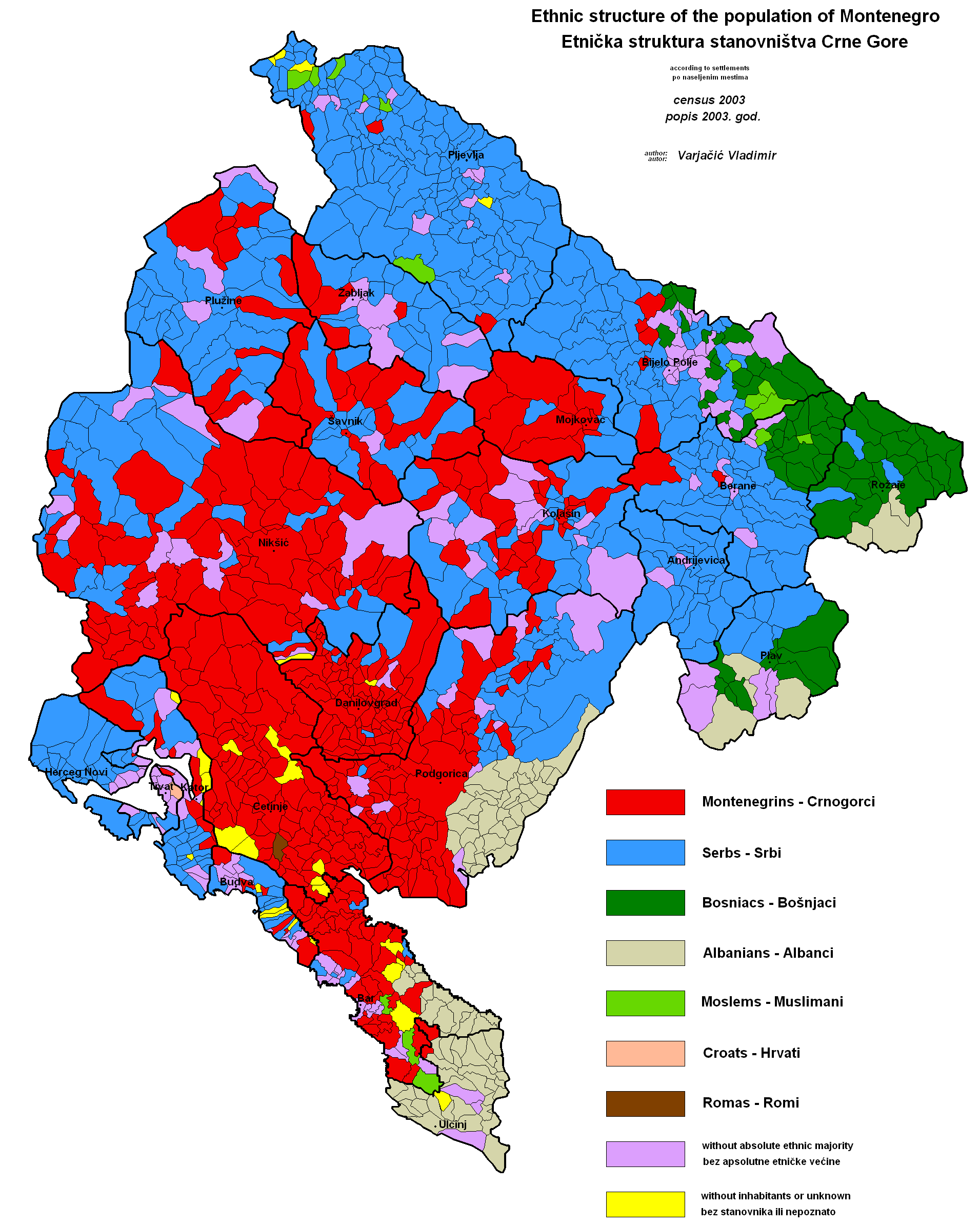
Ethnic structure of Montenegro by settlements 2003.

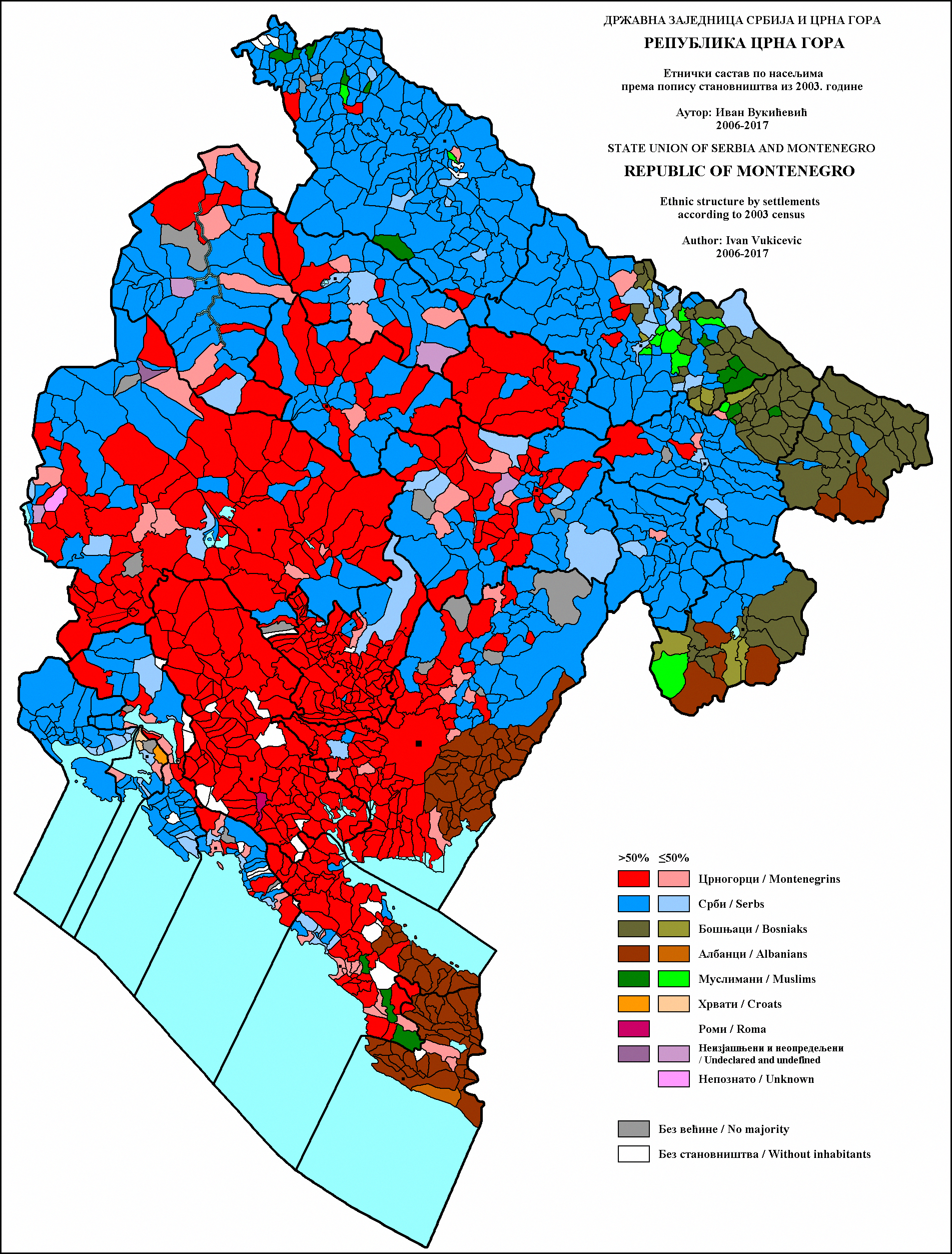
Ethnic structure of Montenegro by settlements 2003.

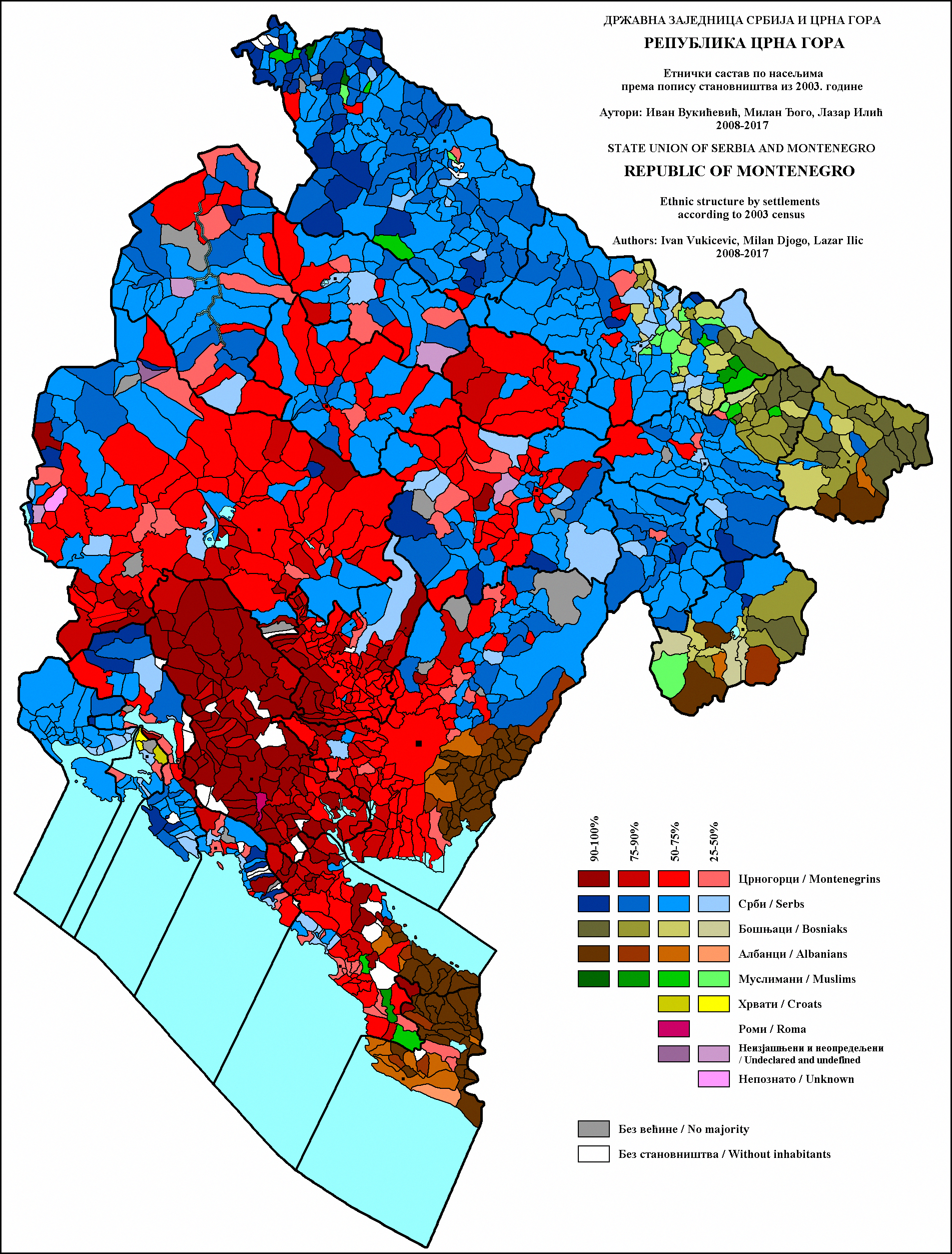
Ethnic structure of Montenegro by settlements 2003.

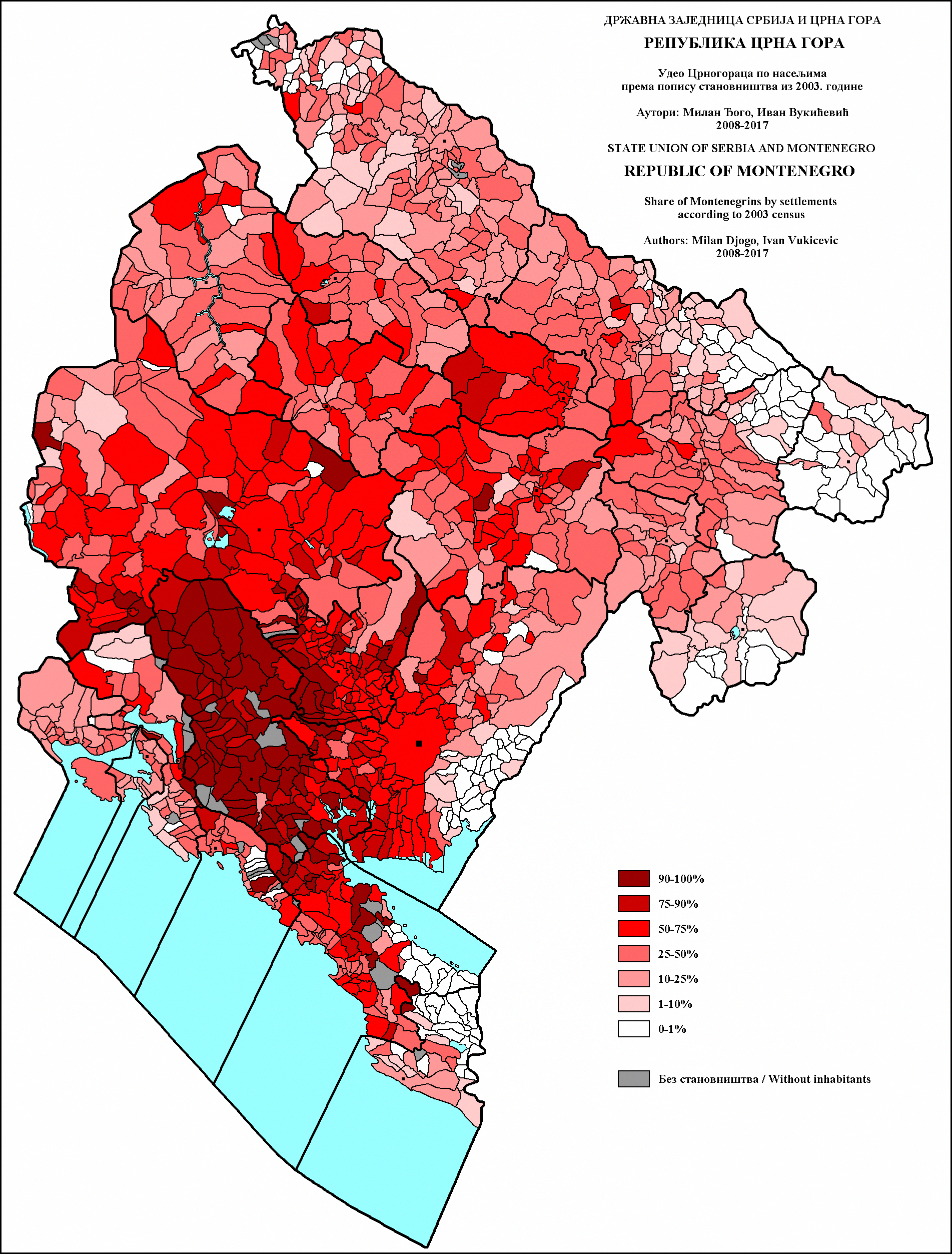
Share of Montenegrins in Montenegro by settlements 2003.

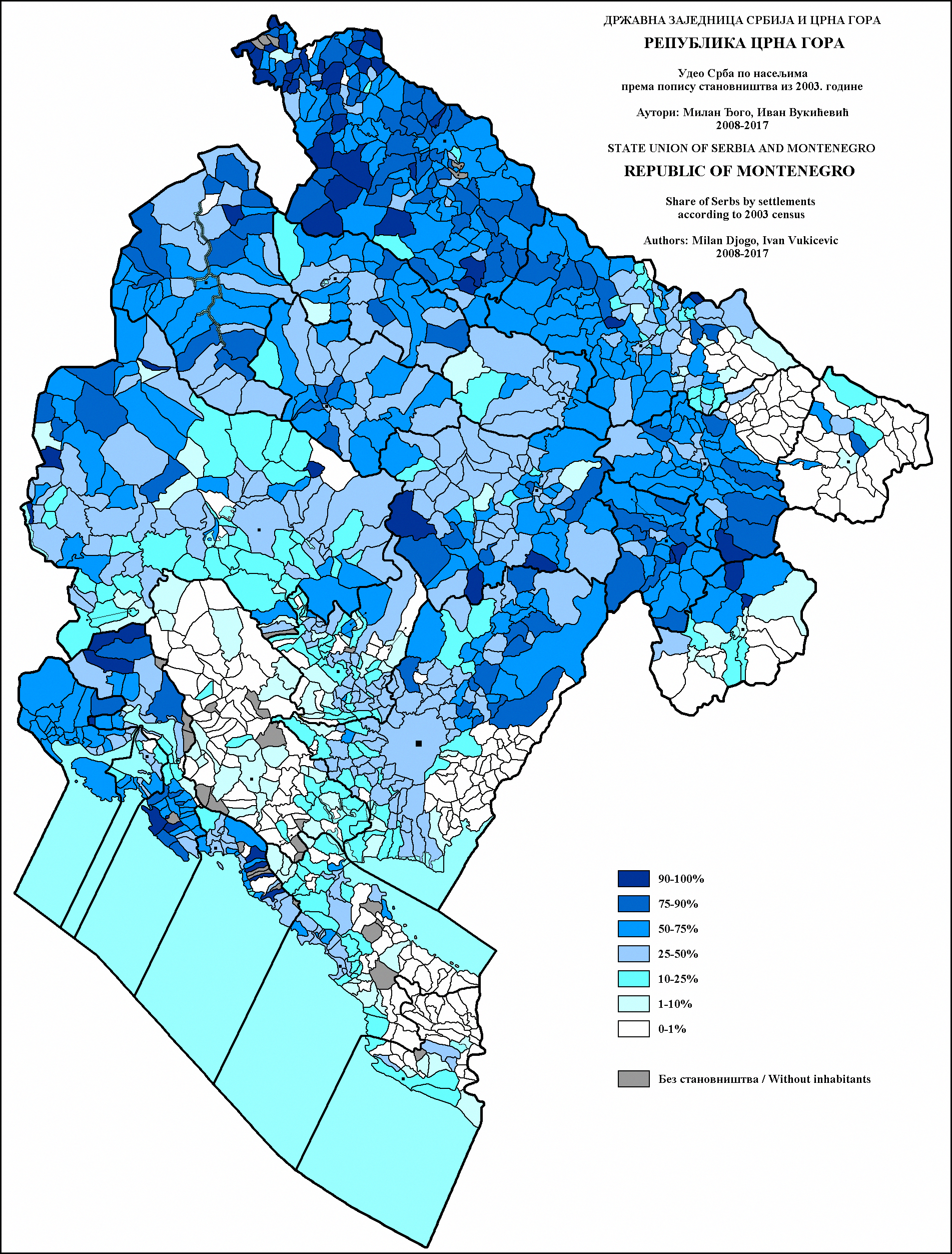
Share of Serbs in Montenegro by settlements 2003.

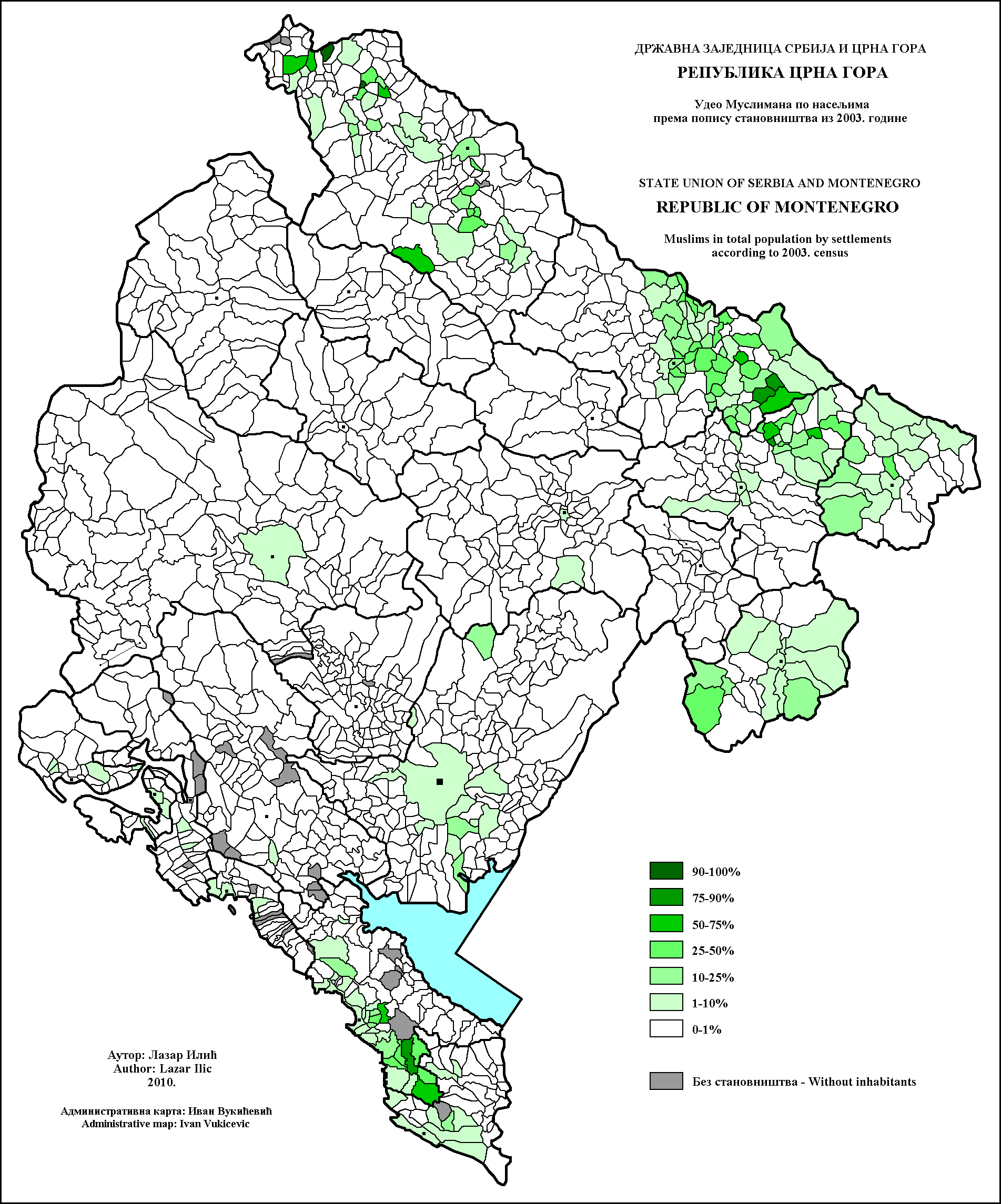
Share of ethnic Muslims in Montenegro by settlements 2003.

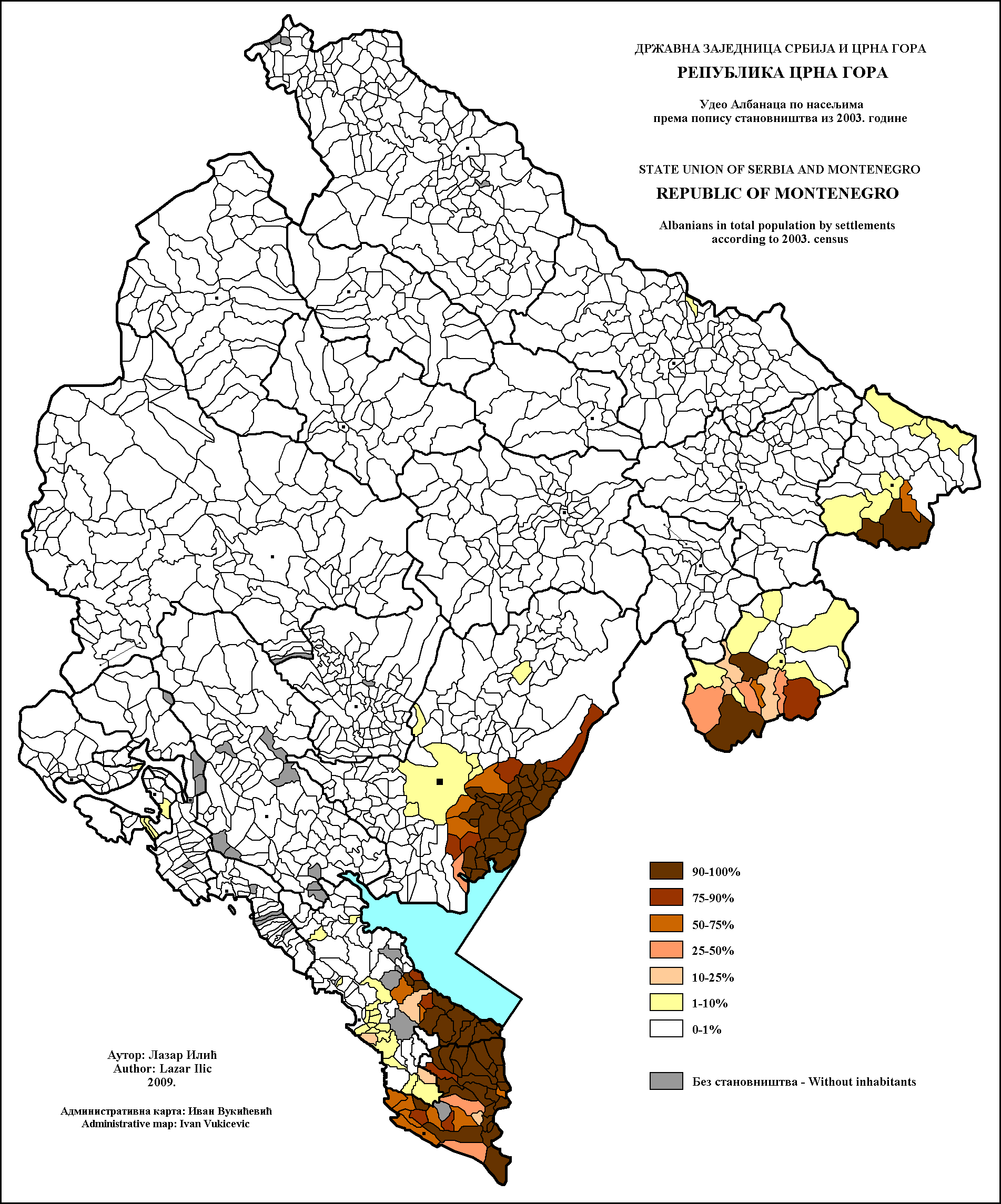
Share of Albanians in Montenegro by settlements 2003.

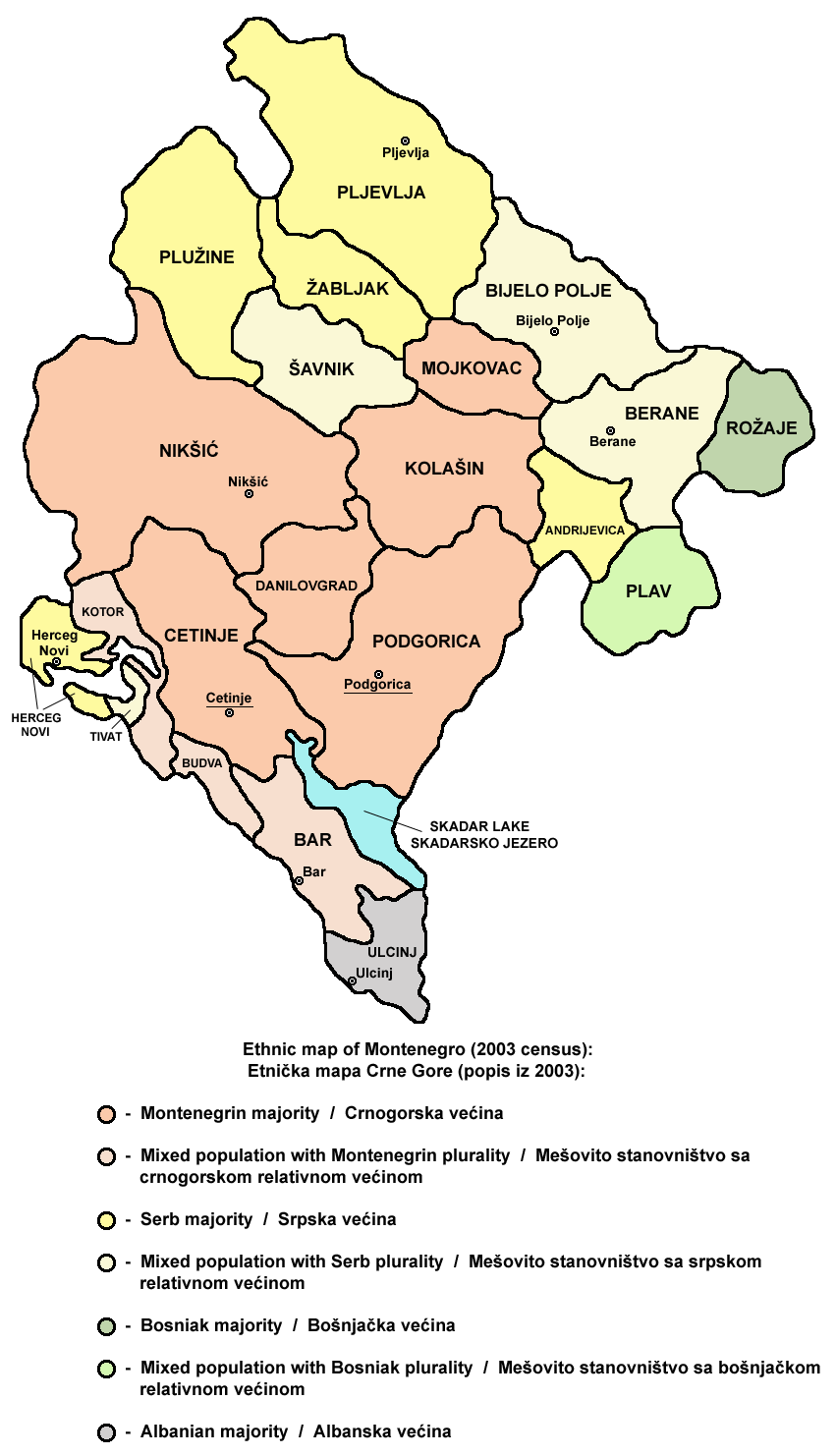
Ethnic structure of Montenegro by municipalities 2003.

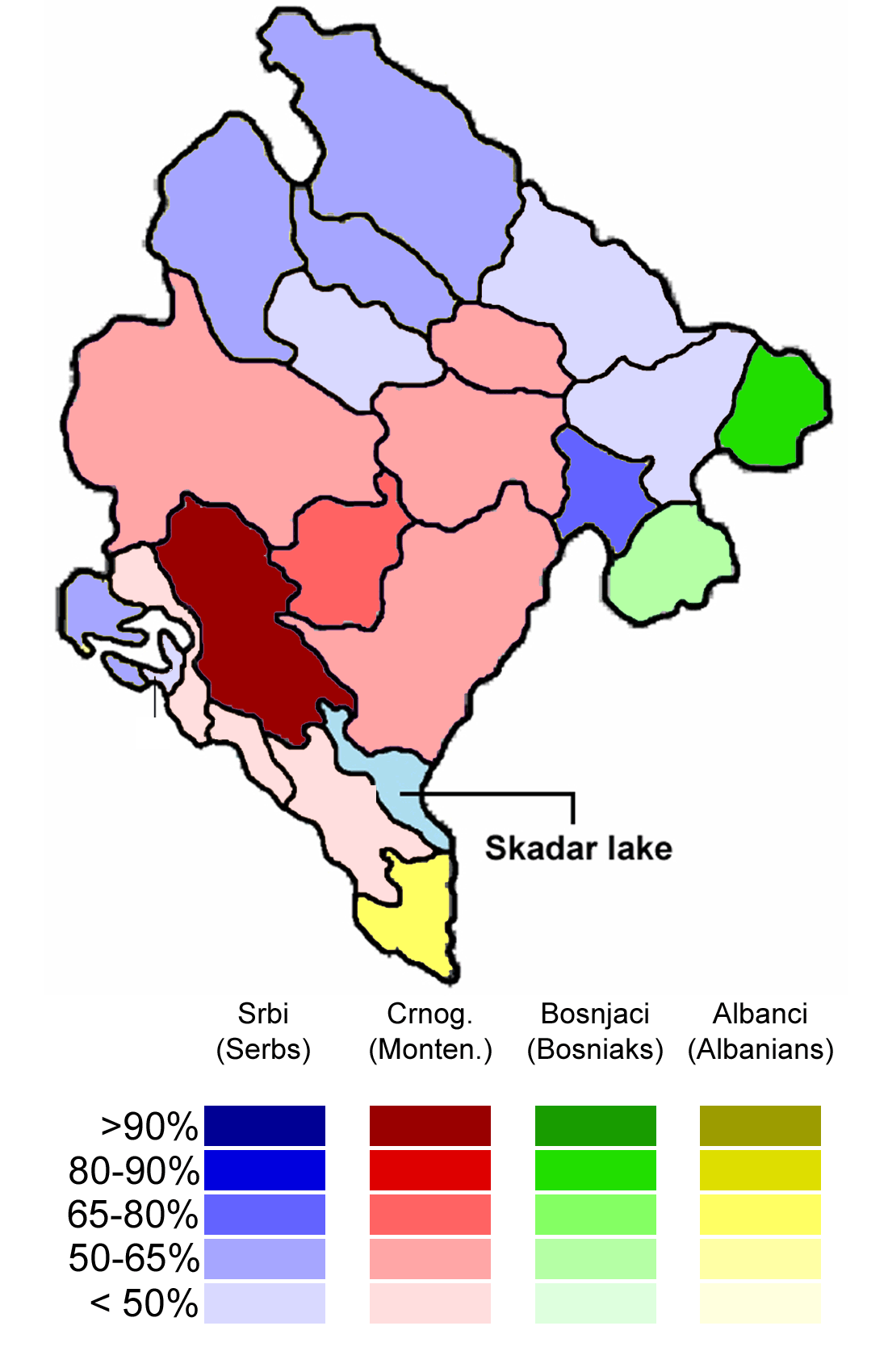
Ethnic structure of Montenegro by municipalities 2003.

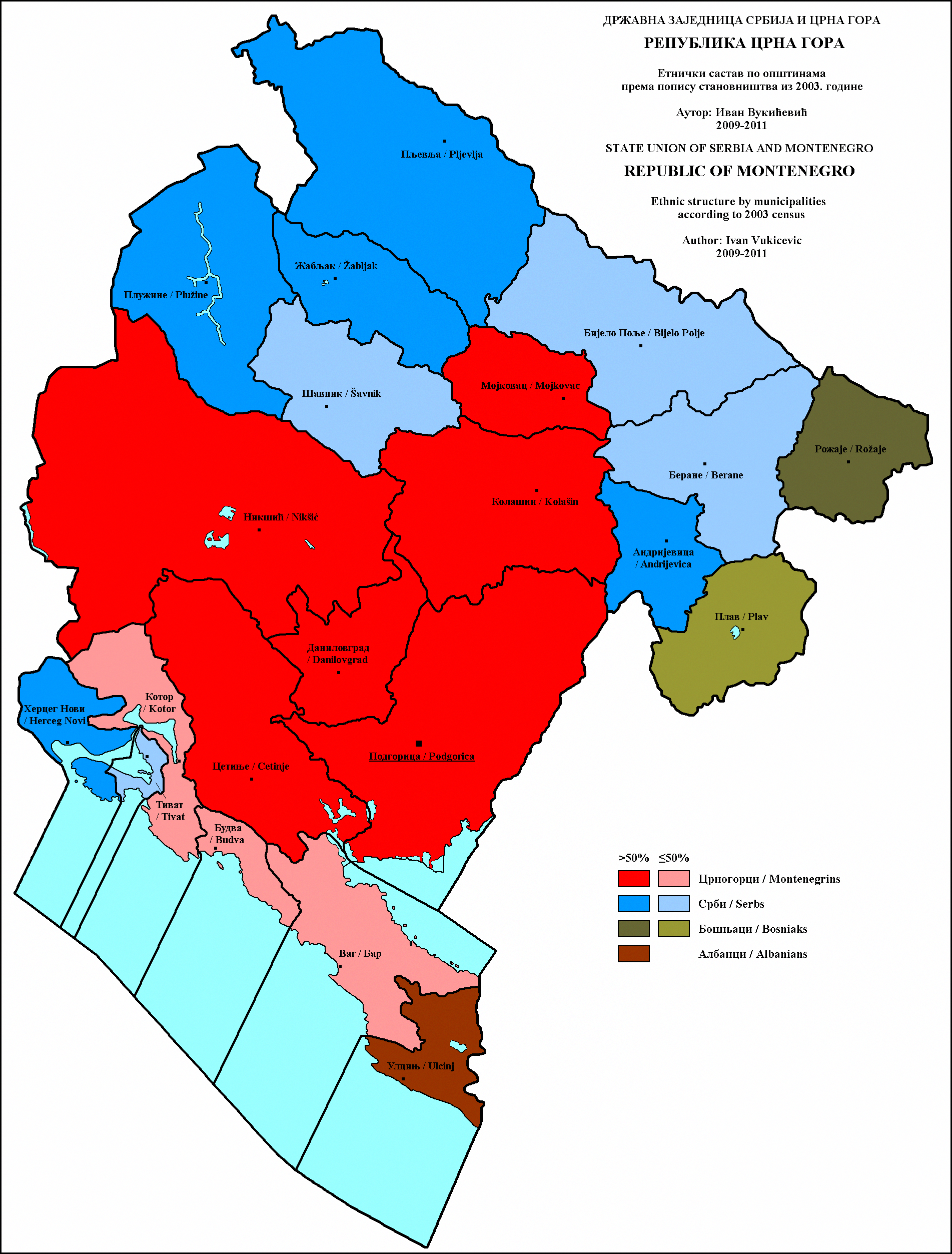
Ethnic structure of Montenegro by municipalities 2003.

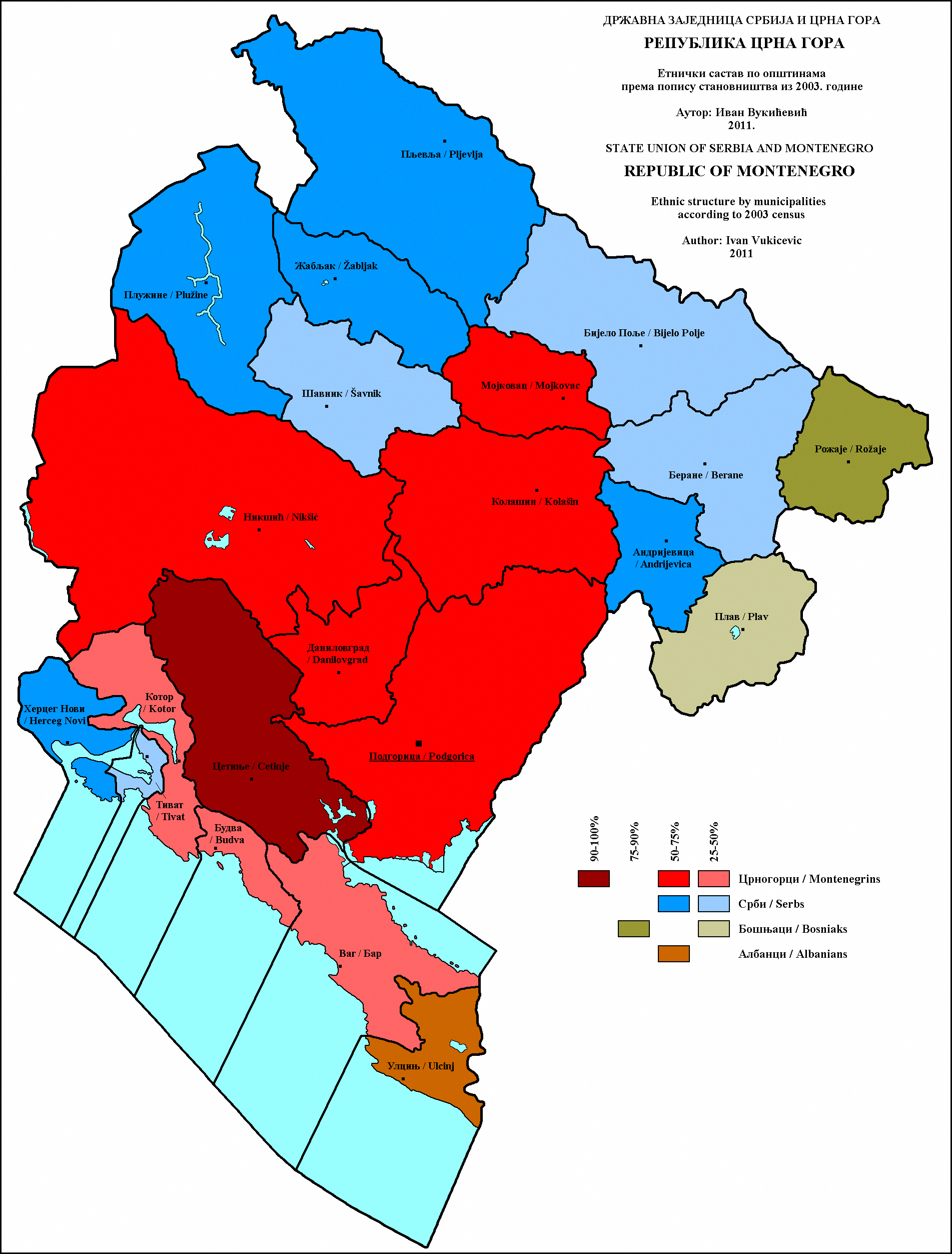
Ethnic structure of Montenegro by municipalities 2003.

According to the 2003 census (November 2003 data)

Andrijevica total 6.384

- Montenegrins 1.475 or 23,10%
- Ethnic Muslims 8 or 0,13%
- Serbs 4.155 or 65,08%
- Albanians 0 or 0,00%
- Croats 2 or 0,03%
- Bosniaks 0 or 0,00%
- Romani 0 or 0,00%
- other 22 or 0,34%
- not declared 234 or 3,67%
- no data 488 or 7,64%

Bar total 45.223

- Montenegrins 19.960 or 44,14%
- Ethnic Muslims 2.852 or 6,31%
- Serbs 11.218 or 24,81%
- Albanians 5.450 or 12,05%
- Croats 268 or 0,59%
- Bosniaks 1.026 or 2,27%
- Romani 50 or 0,11%
- other 722 or 1,60%
- not declared 1.771 or 3,92%
- no data 1.906 or 4,21%

Berane total 40.885

- Montenegrins 9282 or 22,70%
- Ethnic Muslims 2.994 or 7,32%
- Serbs 16.939 or 41,43%
- Albanians 41 or 0,10%
- Croats 50 or 0,12%
- Bosniaks 8.994 or 22,00%
- Romani 133 or 0,33%
- other 222 or 0,54%
- not declared 223 or 0,55%
- no data 837 or 2,05%

Bijelo Polje total 57.124

- Montenegrins 9.214 or 16,13%
- Ethnic Muslims 9.816 or 17,18%
- Serbs 20.743 or 36,31%
- Albanians 35 or 0,06%
- Croats 49 or 0,09%
- Bosniaks 14.409 or 25,22%
- Romani 146 or 0,26%
- other 165 or 0,29%
- not declared 1.033 or 1,81%
- no data 1.514 or 2,65%

Budva total 16.095

- Montenegrins 7.333 or 45,56%
- Ethnic Muslims 205 or 1,27%
- Serbs 6.510 or 40,45%
- Albanians 60 or 0,37%
- Croats 177 or 1,10%
- Bosniaks 22 or 0,14%
- Romani 37 or 0,23%
- other 460 or 2,86%
- not declared 1.153 or 7,16%
- no data 138 or 0,86%

Cetinje total 18.749

- Montenegrins 16.927 or 90,28%
- Ethnic Muslims 21 or 0,11%
- Serbs 865 or 4,61%
- Albanians 46 or 0,25%
- Croats 47 or 0,25%
- Bosniaks 5 or 0,03%
- Romani 131 or 0,70%
- other 170 or 0,91%
- not declared 303 or 1,62%
- no data 234 or 1,25%

Danilovgrad total 16.400

- Montenegrins 11.141 or 67,93%
- Ethnic Muslims 53 or 0,32%
- Serbs 4.177 or 25,47%
- Albanians 8 or 0,05%
- Croats 42 or 0,26%
- Bosniaks 0 or 0,00%
- Romani 11 or 0,07%
- other 127 or 0,77%
- not declared 428 or 2,61%
- no data 413 or 2,52%

Herceg Novi total 33971

- Montenegrins 9.651 or 28,41%
- Ethnic Muslims 218 or 0,64%
- Serbs 17.818 or 52,45%
- Albanians 25 or 0,07%
- Croats 831 or 2,45%
- Bosniaks 89 or 0,26%
- Romani 290 or 0,85%
- other 1.350 or 3,97%
- not declared 2.800 or 8,24%
- no data 899 or 2,65%

Kolašin total 9.975

- Montenegrins 5.022 or 50,35%
- Ethnic Muslims 34 or 0,34%
- Serbs 4.449 or 44,60%
- Albanians 1 or 0,01%
- Croats 11 or 0,11%
- Bosniaks 1 or 0,01%
- Romani 0 or 0,00%
- other 74 or 0,74%
- not declared 337 or 3,38%
- no data 46 or 0,46%

Kotor total 23.481

- Montenegrins 11.002 or 46,85%
- Ethnic Muslims 109 or 0,46%
- Serbs 7.197 or 30,65%
- Albanians 63 or 0,27%
- Croats 1.842 or 7,84%
- Bosniaks 17 or 0,07%
- Romani 36 or 0,15%
- other 746 or 3,18%
- not declared 2.255 or 9,60%
- no data 214

Mojkovac total 10.274

- Montenegrins 5.627 or 54,77%
- Ethnic Muslims 18 or 0,18%
- Serbs 4.200 or 40,88%
- Albanians 1 or 0,01%
- Croats 3 or 0,03%
- Bosniaks9 or 0,09%
- Romani 0 or 0,00%
- other 53 or 0,52%
- not declared 332 or 3,23%
- no data 31 or 0,30%

Nikšić total 76.671

- Montenegrins 47.923 or 62,50%
- Ethnic Muslims 733 or 0,96%
- Serbs 20.433 or 26,65%
- Albanians 32 or 0,04%
- Croats 139 or 0,18%
- Bosniaks 177 or 0,23%
- Romani 346 or 0,45%
- other 743 or 0,97%
- not declared 5.483 or 7,15%
- no data 662 or 0,86%

Plav total 21.604

- Montenegrins 790 or 3,66%
- Ethnic Muslims 1.249 or 5,78%
- Serbs 2.731 or 12,64%
- Albanians 5.673 or 26,26%
- Croats 4 or 0,02%
- Bosniaks 10.960 or 50,73%
- Romani 0 or 0,00%
- other 78 or 0,36%
- not declared 73 or 0,34%
- no data 46 or 0,21%

Pljevlja total 36.918

- Montenegrins 7.750 or 20,99%
- Ethnic Muslims 3.088 or 8,36%
- Serbs 21.972 or 59,52%
- Albanians 11 or 0,03%
- Croats 17 or 0,05%
- Bosniaks 2.023 or 5,48%
- Romani 0 or 0,00%
- other 148 or 0,40%
- not declared 1.705 or 4,62%
- no data 204 or 0,55%

Plužine total 4.294

- Montenegrins 1.400 or 32,60%
- Ethnic Muslims 1 or 0,02%
- Serbs 2.601 or 60,57%
- Albanians 0 or 0,00%
- Croats 1 or 0,02%
- Bosniaks 0 or 0,00%
- Romani 0 or 0,00%
- other 12 or 0,28%
- not declared 260 or 6,05%
- no data 19 or 0,44%

Podgorica total 179.403

- Montenegrins 98.562 or 54,94%
- Ethnic Muslims 4.782 or 2,67%
- Serbs 44.992 or 25,08%
- Albanians 14.238 or 7,94%
- Croats 734 or 0,41%
- Bosniaks 2.672 or 1,49%
- Romani 1.542 or 0,86%
- other 2.184 or 1,22%
- not declared 7.506 or 4,18%
- no data 2.191 or 1,22%

Rožaje total 27.562

- Montenegrins 453 or 1,64%
- Ethnic Muslims 1.670 or 6,06%
- Serbs 916 or 3,32%
- Albanians 1.190 or 4,32%
- Croats 8 or 0,03%
- Bosniaks 22.512 or 81,68%
- Romani 15 or 0,05%
- other 405 or 1,47%
- not declared 73 or 0,26%
- no data 320 or 1,16%

Šavnik total 2.972

- Montenegrins 1.386 or 46,64%
- Ethnic Muslims 5 or 0,17%
- Serbs 1.416 or 47,64%
- Albanians 0 or 0,00%
- Croats 3 or 0,10%
- Bosniaks 0 or 0,00%
- Romani 0 or 0,00%
- other 25 or 0,84%
- not declared 130 or 4,37%
- no data 7 or 0,24%

Tivat total 13.991

- Montenegrins 4.126 or 29,49%
- Ethnic Muslims 165 or 1,18%
- Serbs 4.911 or 35,10%
- Albanians 144 or 1,03%
- Croats 2.761 or 19,73%
- Bosniaks 56 or 0,40%
- Romani 20 or 0,14%
- other 470 or 3,36%
- not declared 1.122 or 8,02%
- no data 216 or 1,54%

Ulcinj total 26.435

- Montenegrins 2.523 or 9,54%
- Ethnic Muslims 692 or 2,62%
- Serbs 1.520 or 5,75%
- Albanians 20.664 or 78,17%
- Croats 70 or 0,26%
- Bosniaks 300 or 1,13%
- Romani 118 or 0,45%
- Black Montenegrins 185 or 0,70%
- other 185 or 0,70%
- not declared 216 or 0,82%
- no data 147 or 0,56%

Žabljak total 4.245

- Montenegrins 1.819 or 42,85%
- Ethnic Muslims 1 or 0,02%
- Serbs 2.129 or 50,15%
- Albanians 0 or 0,00%
- Croats 3 or 0,07%
- Bosniaks 0 or 0,00%
- Romani 0 or 0,00%
- other 15 or 0,35%
- not declared 278 or 6,55%

This census witnessed the return of ethnic Bosniaks; although there are still people who declare themselves as ethnic Muslims. Also, there are very few people left who consider themselves Yugoslavs. Also a noticeable difference compared to 1991 census is the reemerging in the number of Serbs, from nearly 60,000 to 200,000 in a decade.

Others include small ethnic groups of non-European/Slavic origins: Romani, Balkan Egyptians and Black Montenegrins.

=== Refugees from Kosovo ===
- Montenegrins - 5,817
- Serbs - 4,495
- Romani - 3,105
- Ethnic Muslims - 1,823
- Egyptians - 1,539
- Albanians - 457
- Bosniaks - 333
- Gorani 83
- Ashkali - 79
- Yugoslavs - 72
- Croats - 27
- Macedonians - 23
- Slovenes 9
- other - 53
- nondeclared - 32
- Total - 17,947

== Linguistic structure ==
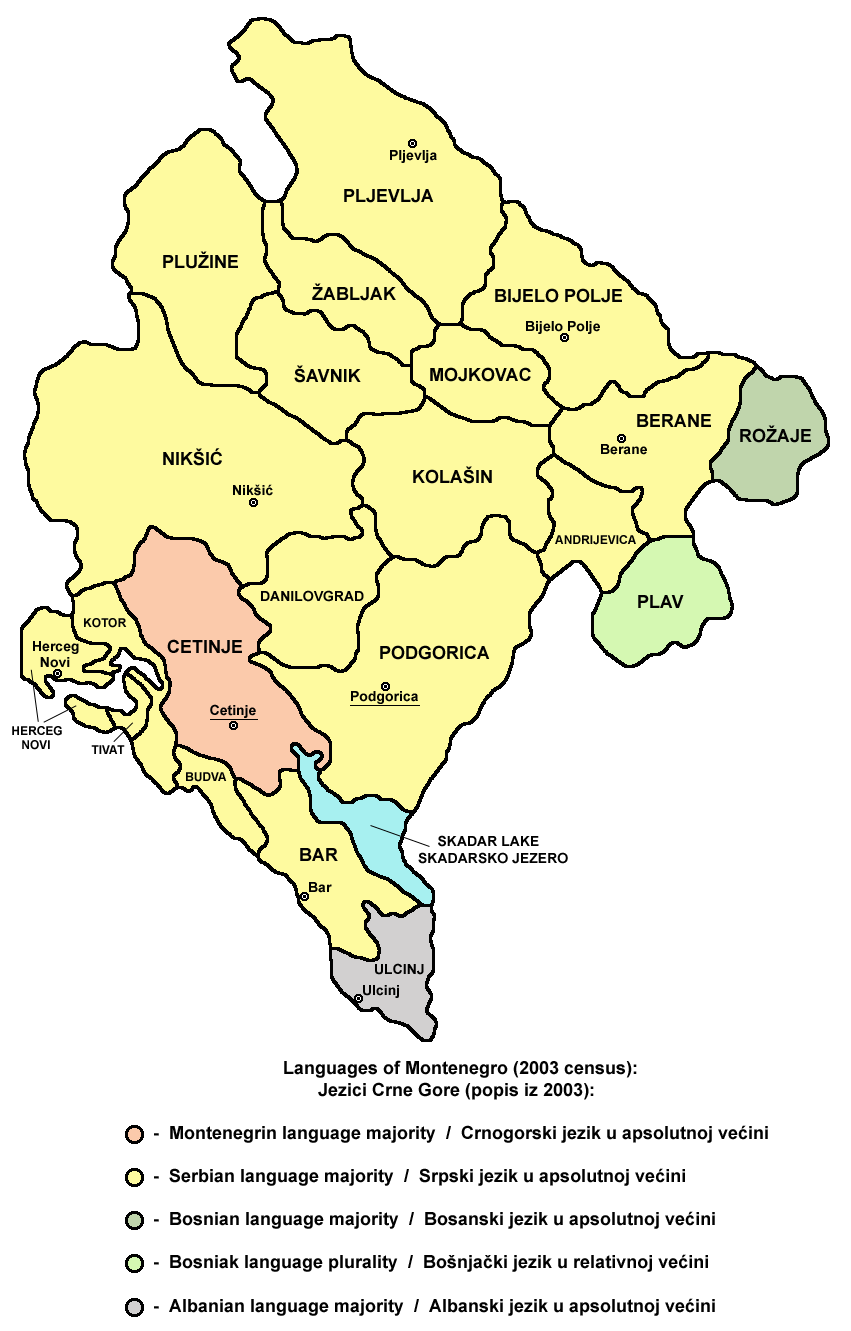
Linguistic map of the Republic of Montenegro according to the 2003 census.

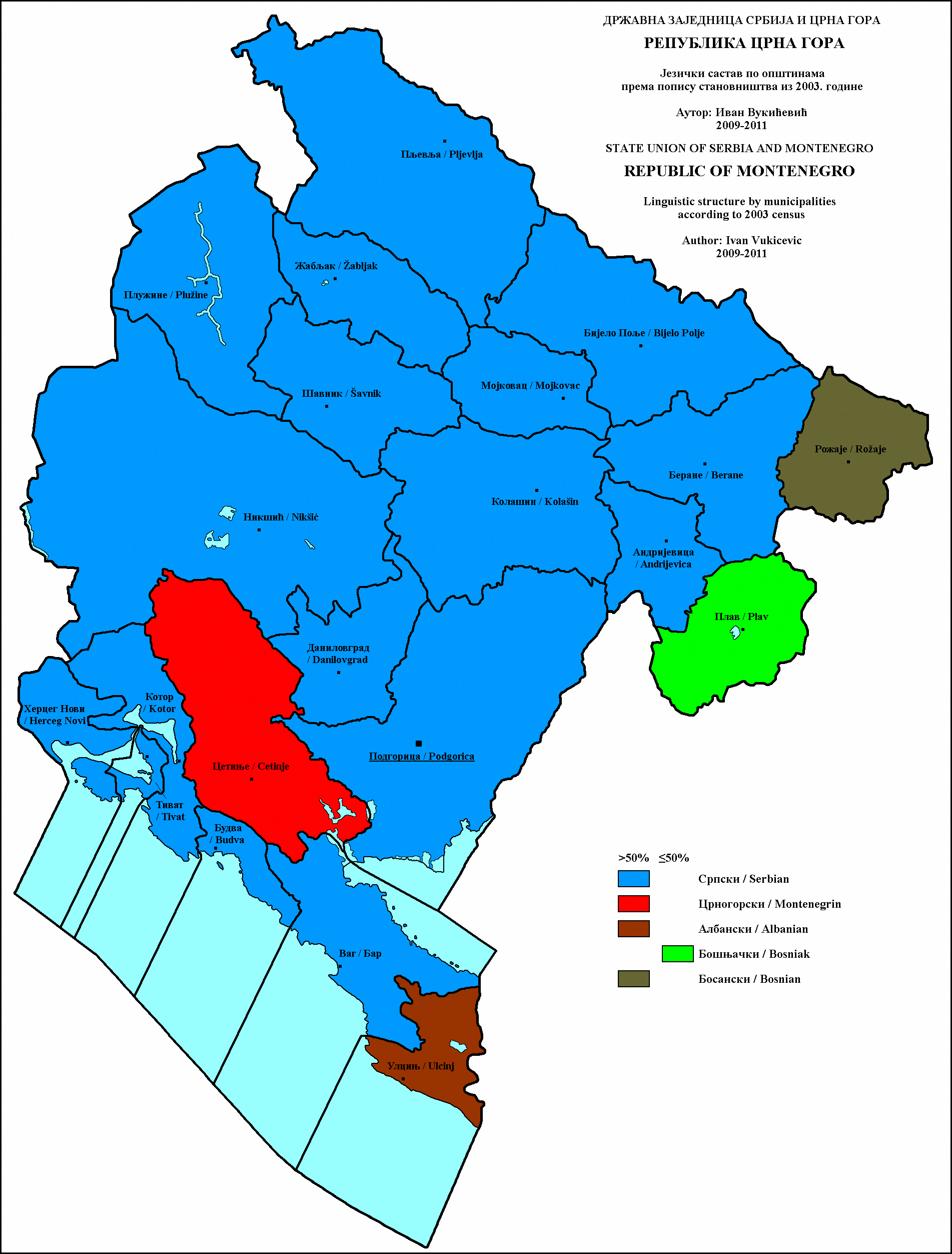
Linguistic structure of Montenegro by municipalities 2003.

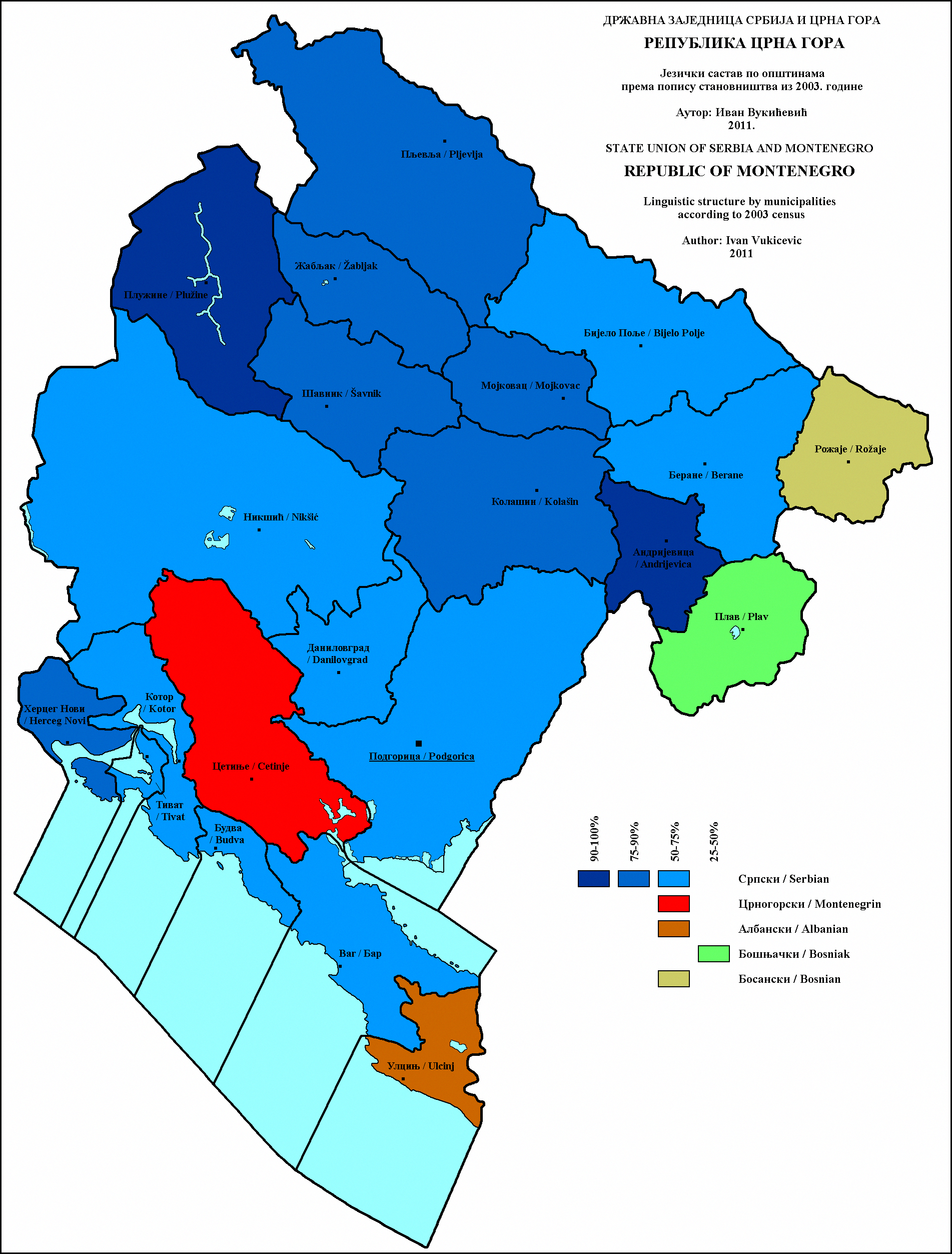
Linguistic structure of Montenegro by municipalities 2003.

From 2003:

- Serbian: 393,740 (63.49%)
  - Serbs - 197,684 (50.21%)
  - Montenegrins - 156,374 (39.71%)
  - Ethnic Muslims - 8,696 (2.21%)
  - Bosniaks - 2,723 (0.69%)
  - Croats - 2,529 (0.64%)
  - Yugoslavs - 1,705 (0.43%)
  - Albanians - 306 (0.08%)
  - Romani - 157 (0.04%)
  - others - 1,847 (0.47%)
  - undeclared and undefined - 18,610 (4.73%)
  - regional affiliation - 891 (0.23%)
  - unknown - 2,218 (0.56%)
- Montenegrin: 136,208 (21.96%)
  - Montenegrins - 106,214 (78%)
  - Ethnic Muslims - 13,627 (10%)
  - Bosniaks - 12,549 (9.21%)
  - Croats - 1,375 (1.01%)
  - Serbs - 349 (0.26%)
  - Albanians - 330 (0.24%)
  - Yugoslavs - 33 (0.02%)
  - Romani - 8 (0.01%)
  - others - 349 (0.26%)
  - undeclared and undefined - 1,106 (0.81%)
  - regionally declared - 80 (0.06%)
  - unknown - 188 (0.14%)
- Albanian: 32,603 (5.26%)
  - Albanians - 30,382 (93.19%)
  - Montenegrins - 776 (2.38%)
  - Ethnic Muslims - 414 (1.27%)
  - Romani - 288 (0.88%)
  - Bosniaks - 15 (0.05%)
  - Serbs - 8 (0.02%)
  - Yugoslavs - 8 (0.02%)
  - Croats - 3 (0.01%)
  - others - 361 (1.11%)
  - undeclared and undefined - 168 (0.51%)
  - regionally declared - 74 (0.23%)
  - unknown - 106 (0.32%)
- Bosniak language: 19,906 (3.2%)
  - Bosniaks - 18,662 (93.75%)
  - Ethnic Muslims - 1,094 (5.5%)
  - Albanians - 72 (0.36%)
  - Montenegrins - 37 (0.19%)
  - Croats - 2 (0.01%)
  - Yugoslavs - 2 (0.01%)
  - others - 15 (0.07%)
  - undeclared and undefined - 11 (0.05%)
  - regionally declared - 6 (0.03%)
  - unknown - 5 (0.02%)
- Bosnian: 14,172 (2.29%)
  - Bosniaks - 13,718 (96.8%)
  - Ethnic Muslims - 282 (1.99%)
  - Albanians - 38 (0.27%)
  - Montenegrins - 24 (0.17%)
  - Serbs - 6 (0.04%)
  - Croats - 6 (0.04%)
  - Yugoslavs - 1 (0.01%)
  - others - 15 (0.11%)
  - undeclared and undefined - 20 (0.14%)
  - regionally declared - 60 (0.42%)
  - unknown - 2 (0.01%)
- Croatian: 2,791 (0.45%)
  - Croats - 2,438 (87.35%)
  - Serbs - 92 (3.3%)
  - Montenegrins - 82 (2.94%)
  - Yugoslavs - 15 (0.54%)
  - Ethnic Muslims - 11 (0.39%)
  - Bosniaks - 5 (0.18%)
  - Albanians - 4 (0.14%)
  - others - 36 (1.29%)
  - undeclared and undefined - 84 (3.01%)
  - regionally declared - 14 (0.5%)
  - unknown - 10 (0.36%)
- Roma: 2,602 (0.42%)
- Macedonian: 507 (0.08%)
- Hungarian: 255 (0.04%)
- Slovene: 232 (0.04%)
- German: 126 (0.02%)
- other: 3,101 (0.5%)
- nondeclared and unknown: 13,902 (2.2%)

== Religious structure ==
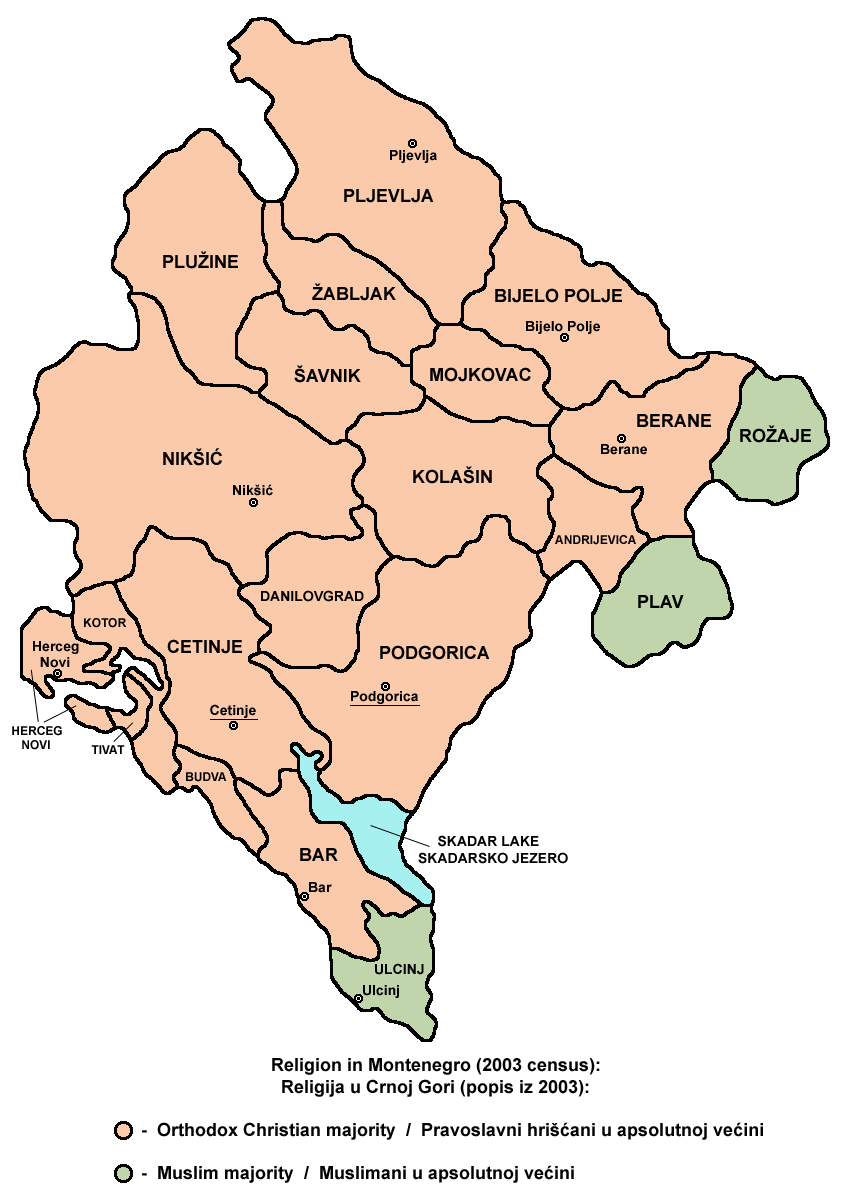
Religion map of the Republic of Montenegro according to the 2003 census.

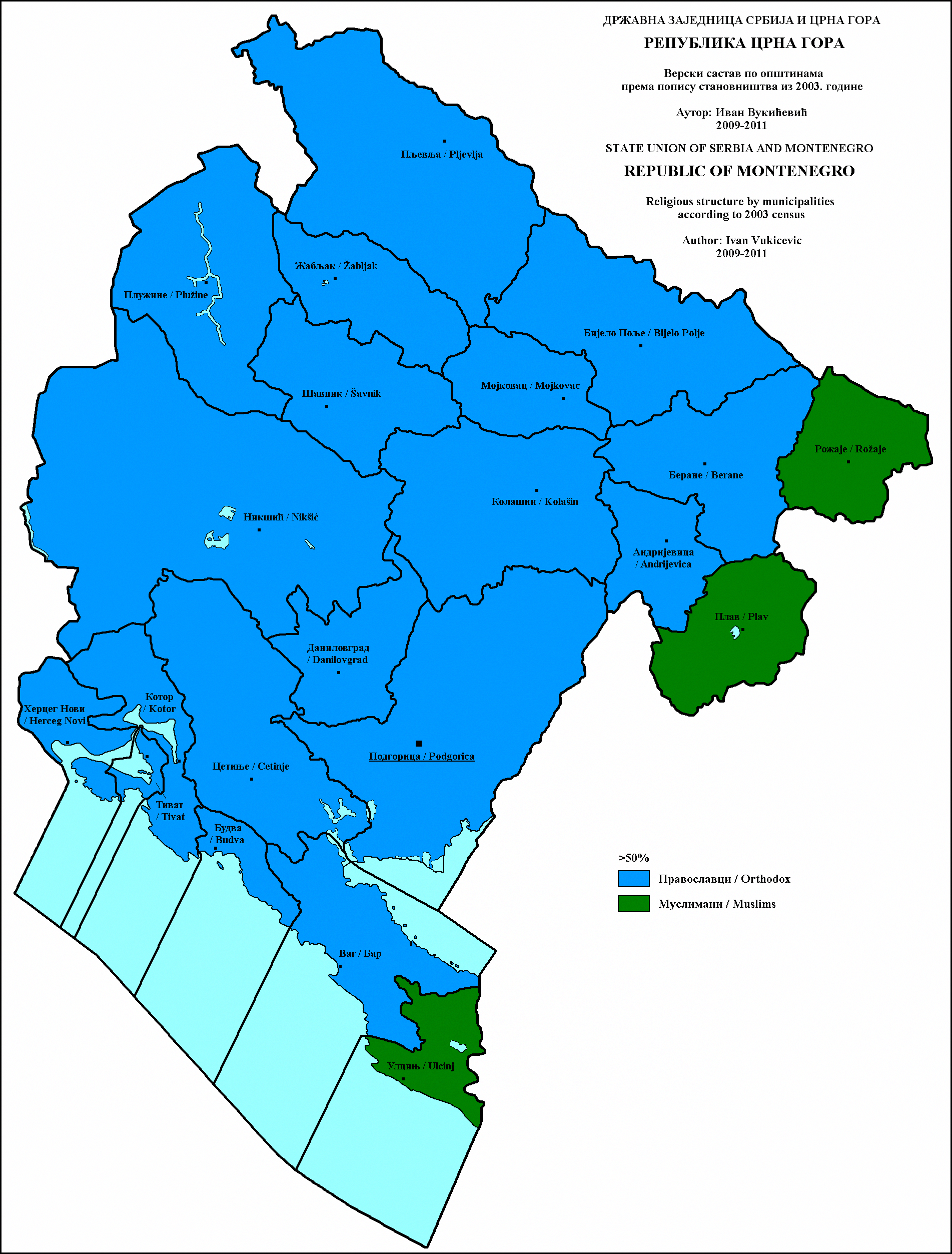
Religious structure of Montenegro by municipalities 2003.

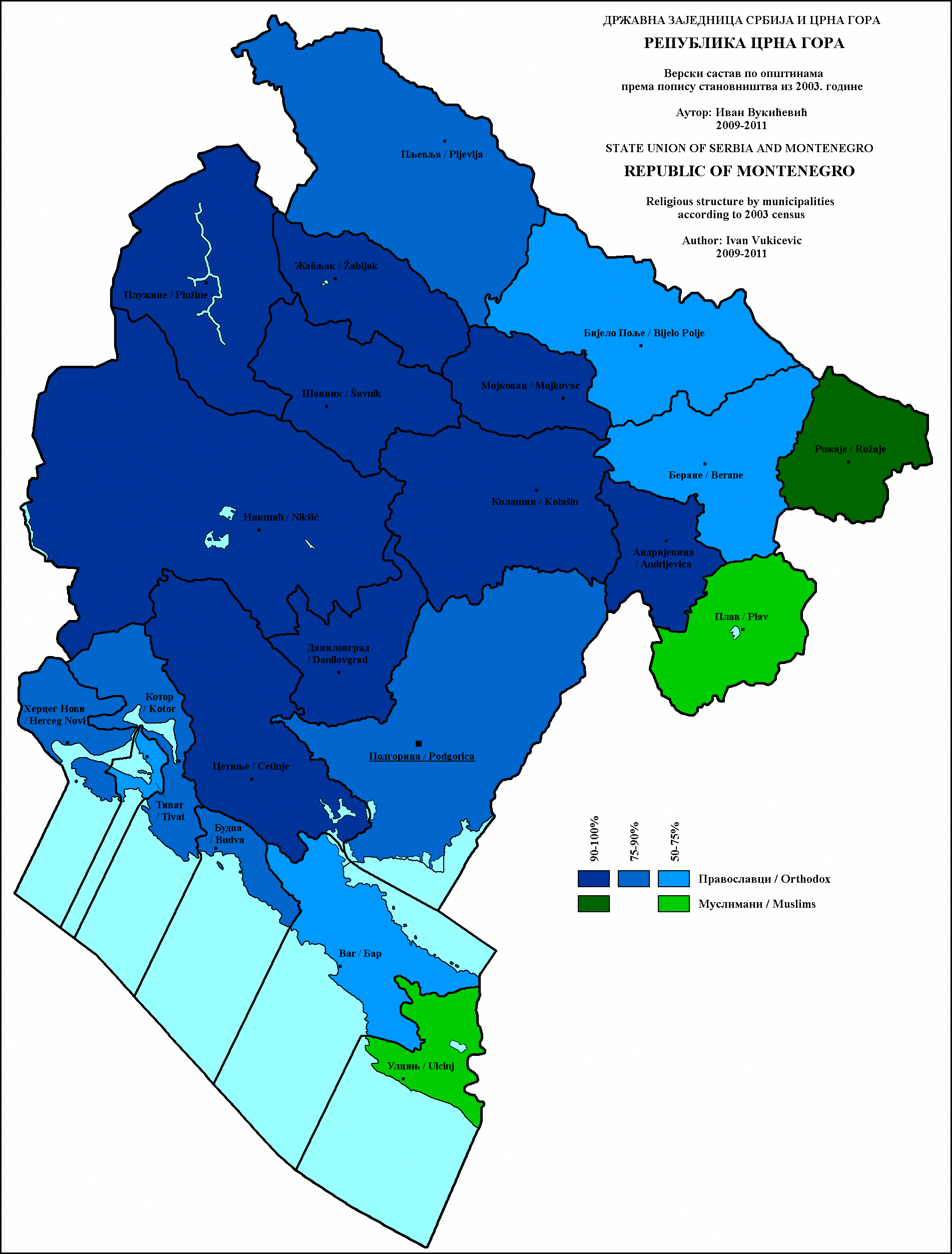
Religious structure of Montenegro by municipalities 2003.

From 2003:

- Orthodox Christianity - 443.394 (71.10%)
  - Montenegrins - 241,728 (52.51%)
  - Serbs - 196,333 (42.65%)
  - Yugoslavs - 1,286 (0.28%)
  - Romany - 250 (0.05%)
  - Croats - 107 (0.02%)
  - Ethnic Muslims - 71 (0.01%)
  - Bosniaks - 32 (0.01%)
  - Albanians - 27 (0.01%)
  - others - 2,191 (0.48%)
  - undeclared and undefined - 15,853 (3.44%)
  - regionally declared - 651 (0.14%)
  - unknown - 1,854 (0.4%)
- Islam - 124.668 (19.99%)
  - Bosniaks - 47,852 (43.49%)
  - Ethnic Muslims - 24,111 (21.91%)
  - Albanians - 22,834 (20.75%)
  - Montenegrins - 11,710 (10.64%)
  - Romany - 1,942 (1.77%)
  - Yugoslavs - 38 (0.03%)
  - Serbs - 33 (0.03%)
  - Croats - 6 (0.01%)
  - others - 486 (0.44%)
  - undeclared and undefined - 766 (0.7%)
  - regionally declared - 75 (0.07%)
  - unknown - 181 (0.16%)
- Roman Catholic - 20.408 (3.27%)
  - Albanians - 8,126 (36.98%)
  - Croats - 6,262 (28.5%)
  - Montenegrins - 3,436 (16.84%)
  - Yugoslavs - 128 (0.58%)
  - Serbs - 114 (0.52%)
  - Romany - 11 (0.05%)
  - Bosniaks - 4 (0.02%)
  - Ethnic Muslims - 4 (0.02%)
  - others - 1,112 (5.06%)
  - undeclared and undefined - 689 (3.14%)
  - regionally declared - 370 (1.68%)
  - unknown - 152 (0.69%)
- Protestant - 568 (0.09%)
  - Montenegrins - 144 (37.6%)
  - Serbs - 51 (13.32%)
  - Romany - 18 (4.7%)
  - Bosniaks - 7 (1.83%)
  - Croats - 7 (1.83%)
  - Yugoslavs - 4 (1.04%)
  - Albanians - 2 (0.52%)
  - Ethnic Muslims - 1 (0.26%)
  - others - 103 (26.89%)
  - undeclared and undefined - 31 (8.09%)
  - regionally declared - 7 (1.83%)
  - unknown - 8 (2.09%)
- occult - 58 (0.01%)
  - Montenegrins - 27 (46.55%)
  - Serbs - 2 (3.45%)
  - Bosniaks - 1 (1.72%)
  - Ethnic Muslims - 1 (1.72%)
  - Croats - 1 (1.72%)
  - others - 3 (5.17%)
  - undeclared and undefined - 2 (3.45%)
  - unknown - 1 (1.72%)
- Judaism - 12
  - Montenegrins - 2 (16.67%)
  - Serbs - 2 (16.67%)
  - others - 8 (66.66%)
- agnostics - 2,524 (0.40%)
- nondeclared - 13,093 (2.10%)
- atheist - 14,260 (2.29%)
- other - 989 (0.16%)

== See also ==
- Demographic history of Montenegro
- Yugoslavia § Demographics
  - Demographics of the Kingdom of Yugoslavia
  - Demographics of the Socialist Federal Republic of Yugoslavia
- Demographics of Serbia and Montenegro
- Demographics of Albania
- Demographics of Bosnia and Herzegovina
- Demographics of Croatia
- Demographics of Kosovo
- Demographics of North Macedonia
- Demographics of Serbia
- Demographics of Slovenia
