= Rizo Šurla =

Montenegrin photographer and actor

- Ризо Шурла
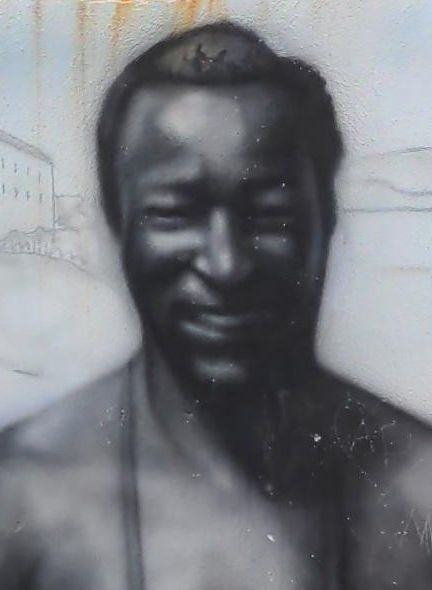
- Mural in Ulcinj depicting Šurla
- Born: 12 January 1922; Ulcinj, Kingdom of Serbs, Croats and Slovenes
- Died: 11 February 2003 (aged 81); Ulcinj, Montenegro, Serbia and Montenegro
- Occupations: Photographer, actor

Rizo Shurdha (Montenegrin: Ризо Шурла; 12 January 1922 – 11 February 2003), also known as Rizo Harapi, was a Black Montenegrin photographer, actor and anti-fascist fighter who fought in the ranks of the Yugoslav Partisans during World War II.

== Biography ==
Rizo Shurdha was born on 12 January 1922 in Ulcinj, then part of the Kingdom of Yugoslavia. His family belonged to the Afro-Albanian community of Ulcinj. African slaves had been brought by the captains of the fleet of Ulcinj in the 18th century. In the 19th century, they gained their freedom and began to integrate themselves in the local community. His father, Saidi, was a direct descendant of the first Africans who settled in Ulcinj and his mother, Fatima was a local from Ulcinj. In his youth he was involved in boxing and worked as a waiter in Dubrovnik. He then went to Belgrade, where he learned the craft of photography. During World War II, he joined the Yugoslav Partisans. After the war, he returned to Ulcinj, where he opened the first photographic studio in the city, which for a long time was the only one. In 1976 he played in the movie Jagoš and Uglješa. He married a Montenegrin from Ulcinj named Nada Račić, with whom he had two children.

He died on 11 February 2003 in his hometown. He was one of the last black representatives in the city.

In 2026, an initiative in Ulcinj was started to name a street after Šurla.
