= Black Montenegrins =

Montenegrin African diaspora community

Afroulqinakët (Albanian); Crnci crnogorci / Arapi (Montenegrin)
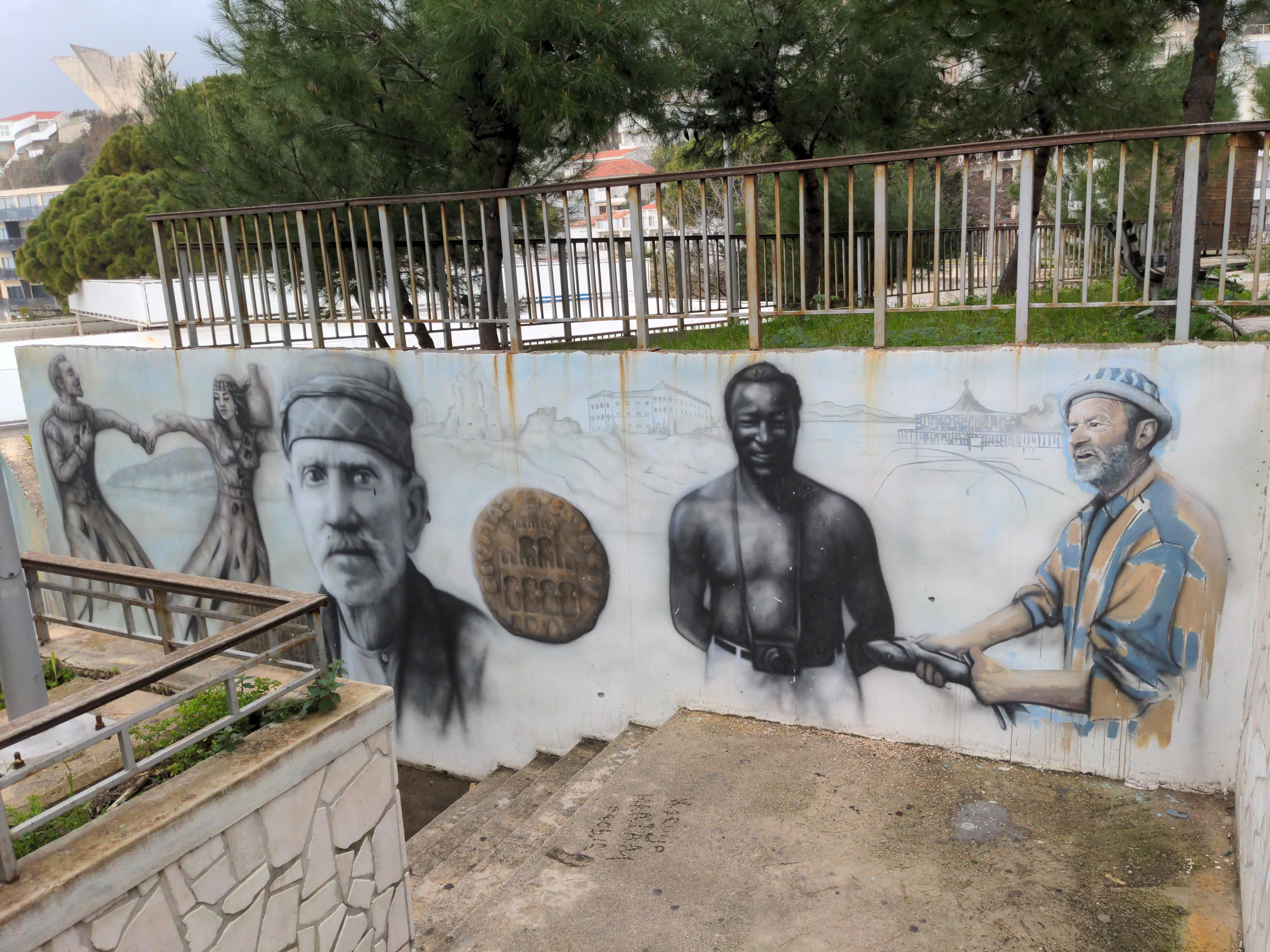
- A mural in Ulcinj depicting Rizo Šurla, a notable Black Montenegrin.
- 1878 (est.): 300
- 2022 (est.): 0

Regions with significant populations
- Ulcinj

Languages
- Montenegrin, Albanian

Religion
- Islam, Christianity

Related ethnic groups
- Albanians, Africans

Black Montenegrins, also known as Afro-Albanians or African Montenegrins, were an African ethnic group from Ulcinj, Montenegro. Black Montenegrins spoke Serbo-Croatian and Albanian. Population estimates from 1878 put their population at around 300, or about 100 households. By 1925, however, the population had decreased to only five households. The population continued dwindling over time, and by the 21st century, the community had intermarried with local communities. The last Black Montenegrins of full African heritage died in the first decades of the 21st century; the last man in 2003 and the last woman in 2022. Notable Black Montenegrins include Rizo Šurla and File Kastrati.

== Names ==
Names for people of African descent in Montenegro vary. They are called Black Montenegrins, Afro-Ulcinac, and Afro-Albanians. They are often simply called Black or Africans. In Albanian, they are sometimes known as Afroulqinakë. However, Black Montenegrins didn't always identify with these terms, instead seeing themselves as simply Montenegrin. In the past, they were called "Arapi", or Arabs, due to their skin color.

== History ==
=== Origins ===
The history of African Montenegrins begins with slavery. The earliest African people brought to the region were enslaved, brought by pirates in the 16th century. The earliest report of slavery in Ulcinj dates to 1571. Slavery in the region was expanded greatly by Albanian Pashaliks within the Ottoman Empire in the 17th century. African enslaved people brought to the region originated in Tanzania, Kenya, Sudan, Niger, and Libya. Around 1650, the first African population in Ulcinj was established, numbering approximately 500. At this time, Ulcinj was the slave trading hub of the region.

As enslaved, Black Montenegrins were involved in a variety of fields. Many were servants of local nobility, while others worked on trade ships or in the local fishing industry. After the enslaved people were freed, they continued working as fishermen and farmers. Some freed enslaved people even became captains of their own ships. Some Black Montenegrins even owned local bars.

Over time, pirate slave trading brought more African enslaved people to the region. The 18th century saw an influx of enslaved people from Chad and Sudan.

=== End of slavery ===
The last shipments of enslaved people were brought to the region at the 19th century. After that, the enslaved people of Ulcinj were freed and allowed to live as free men. Early on in the post-slavery era, there were rules prohibited interracial marriage. Black people were required to marry among other Black people. There were also cultural customs condoning interracial marriage. However, once the anti-miscegenation laws were abolished, the Black Montenegrin community began to inter-marry. In time, the Black Montenegrin community in Ulcinj began to speak Albanian and converted to Islam, integrating into the local culture.

In 1878, following the Treaty of Berlin, Montenegro became recognized as an independent country by the rest of Europe. At the same time, the country was expanded to include territory not previously held. This included the town of Ulcinj, thus making the African population of the town Montenegrins. The Black Montenegrin population in Ulcinj circa 1878 is estimated to have been roughly 100 households, or 300 people. However, around this time, some of the Black Montenegrin population moved to Albania, following the expansion of territory.

Little discrimination of Black Montenegrins was reported in the post-slavery era. According to Šurla, the multi-racial background of Montenegro contributed to this. He said, "I never had any problems. I always felt like a Yugoslav, a Montenegrin. I was born here, in this multinational environment, and I think I lived a beautiful and happy life." Black Montenegrins are said to have coexisted peacefully with the Albanian population of Ulcinj. The local Muslim faith is credited as one reason why.

=== Intermarriage and legacy ===
In the early 20th century, Nicholas I of Montenegro offered a position in his court to a Black Montenegrin from Ulcinj. However, this offer was turned down, due to the belief that the man would simply be an object of ridicule in the court.

By 1925, at which time Montenegro was part of the Kingdom of Yugoslavia, the Black Montenegrin population had reduced to 25 households. After World War II, most of those families had moved from Ulcinj.

During World War II, Black Montenegrins fought for the Yugoslav Partisans. Rizo Šurla was one such man to do so, fighting on the Syrmian Front. Following the war, Šurla became an actor and founded a photography studio.

By the 21st century, only a few Black Montenegrins were still alive. The last Black Montenegrin man, Rizo Šurla, died in 2003, and the last woman, File Kastrati, died in 2022. However, both were married and had children; these children do not identify as Black or African. Furthermore, the legacy of Black Montenegrins continues to live on. They are said to have contributed greatly to the multi-racial legacy of Ulcinj. In 2026, it was announced that a street in Ulcinj would be named after Šurla, as a legacy of the Black Montenegrin community in the city.

== Culture ==
Much of the culture of Black Montenegrins remains unrecorded. However, the Saravali dance, or Dum Sharavelli dance, has been noted as a cultural artifact of the community. The style of dance combines African dance with Balkan music. A local field, called the Arapi Field, is a common spot for this dance, even to this day.

== See also ==
- Muslims (ethnic group)
- Macedonians in Montenegro
- Romani people in Montenegro
- Albanians in Montenegro
