= Macedonians in Montenegro =

Ethnic group in Montenegro

Macedonians in Montenegro Македонци во Црна Гора Makedonci u Crnoj Gori Македонци у Црној Гори
Total population
- 834 (2023 census)

Languages
- Macedonian and Montenegrin

Religion
- Eastern Orthodoxy

The Macedonians in Montenegro form a small minority in the country. The last official census showed that there are 900 Macedonians in Montenegro. According to the Macedonian associations in Montenegro there are about 2000 Macedonians living in Montenegro.

== History of the Macedonians in Montenegro ==
By 1948, 133 Macedonians lived in Montenegro, this number rose to 875 in 1981. 1,072 Macedonians were counted in the 1991 Yugoslav Census, this number had fallen to 819 by 2003. Macedonian was the mother language of 507 people. The Macedonians were concentrated in Podgorica, Herceg Novi and Tivat.

== Organizations ==
The two main organizations of the Macedonians in Montenegro are the Association of Montenegrin-Macedonian Friendship and the National Community of Macedonians in Montenegro, which was established in 2006.

The National Community of Macedonians aims to make the Macedonian language more popular in Montenegro and to help Macedonians integrate better into the Montenegrin system and market.

== See also ==
- Montenegro–North Macedonia relations
- Macedonian diaspora
- Ethnic groups of Montenegro
- Montenegrins of North Macedonia
