= Culture of Montenegro =

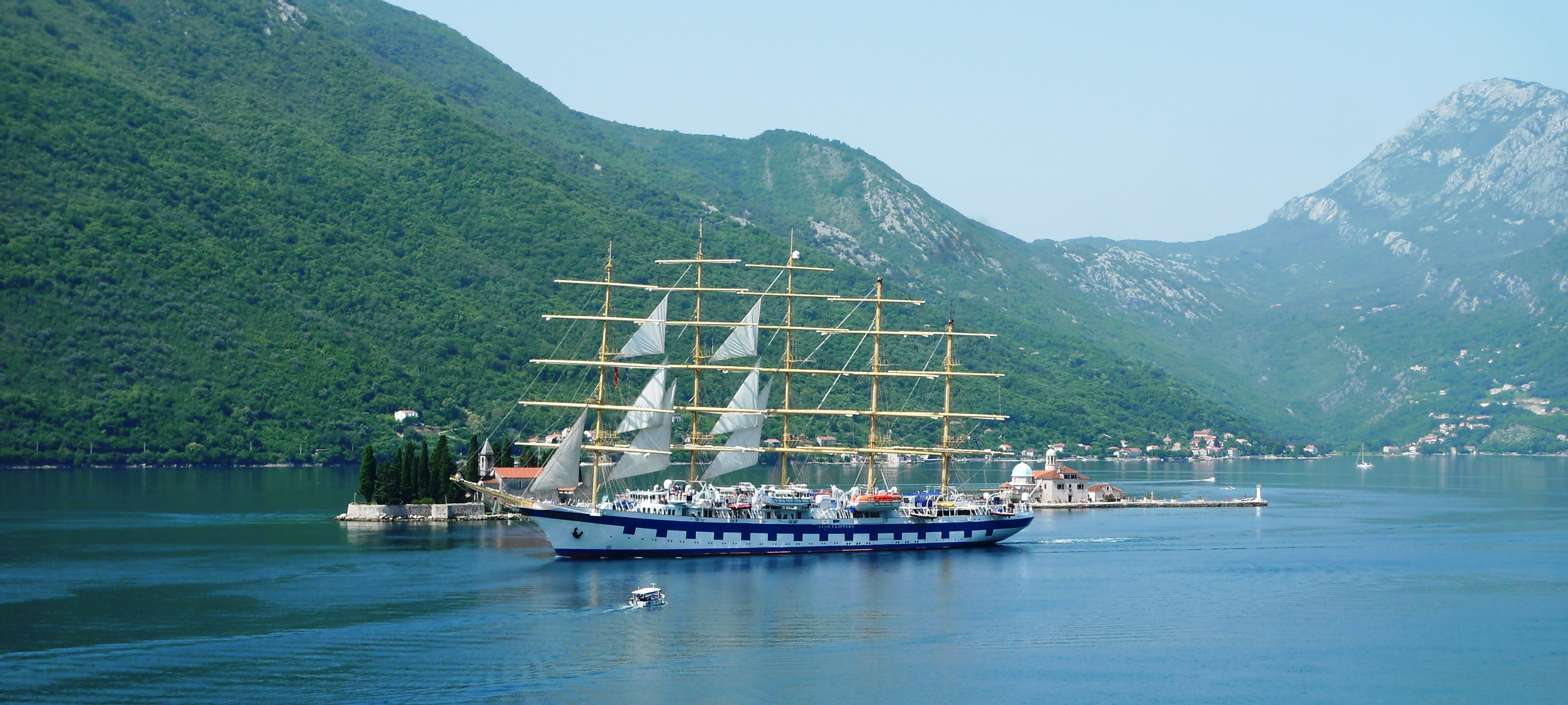
The Royal Clipper at the Montenegrin coast

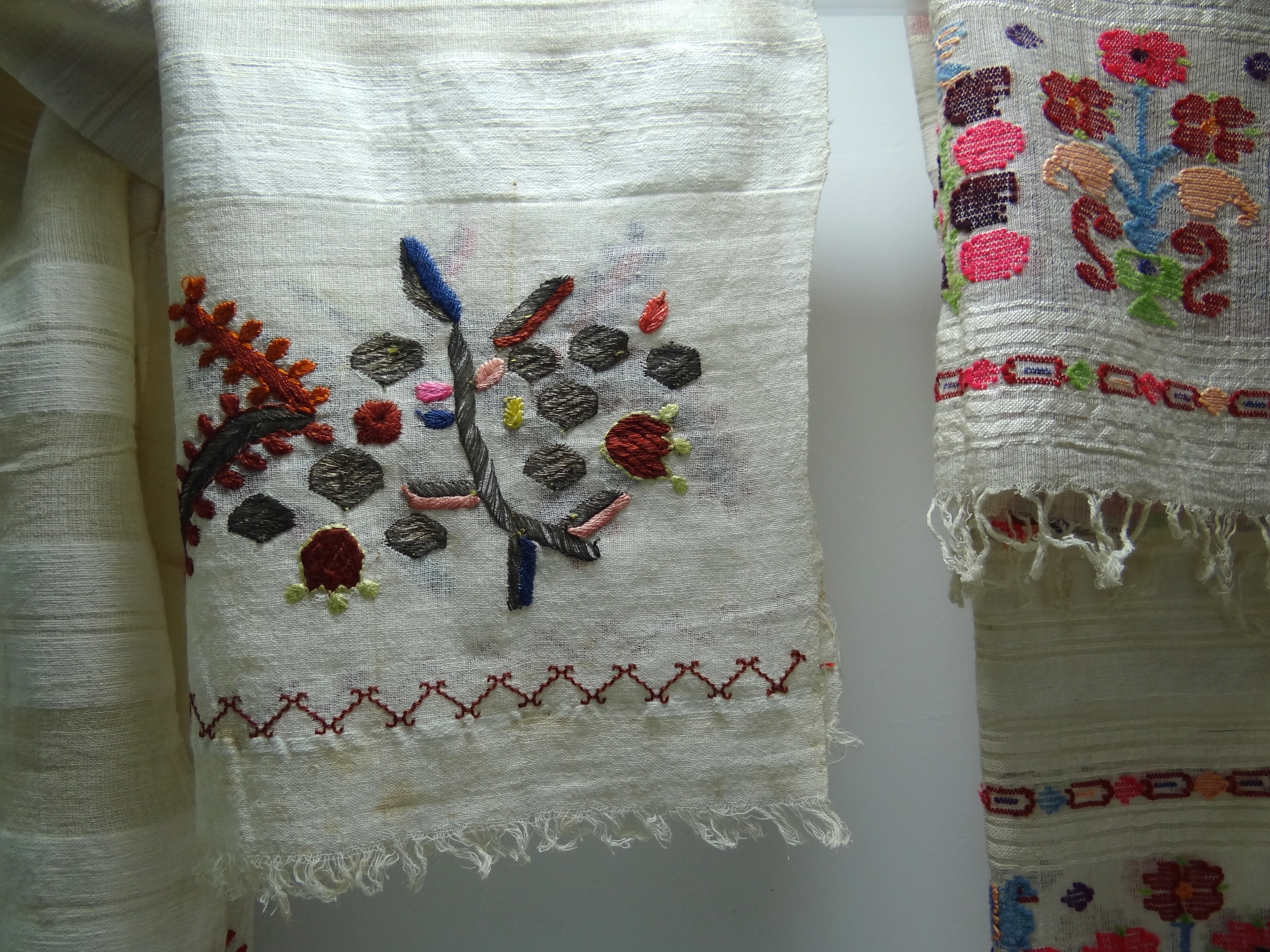
Montenegrin traditional weaving in the Ethnographic Museum in Cetinje

The culture of Montenegro is as pluralistic and diverse as its history and geographical position would suggest. Montenegro's culture has been influenced by the Serbian Empire, the Byzantine Empire, ancient Greece, ancient Rome, Christianity, the Ottoman Empire, the Republic of Venice, the Habsburg monarchy, and Yugoslavia.

== Traditions and customs ==
The Slava is exclusive custom of the Serbian Orthodox Church believers, each family has one patron saint that they venerate on their feast day. The Serbian Orthodox Church uses the traditional Julian calendar, as per which Christmas Day (December 25) falls currently on January 7 of the Gregorian calendar, thus the Serbs celebrate Christmas on January 7, shared with the Orthodox churches of Jerusalem, Russia, Georgia and the Greek Old Calendarists. An example of a Montenegrin tradition consists of newly-weds planting an olive tree on their wedding day as a symbol of marriage. This tradition was made into law by King Nikola during his reign.

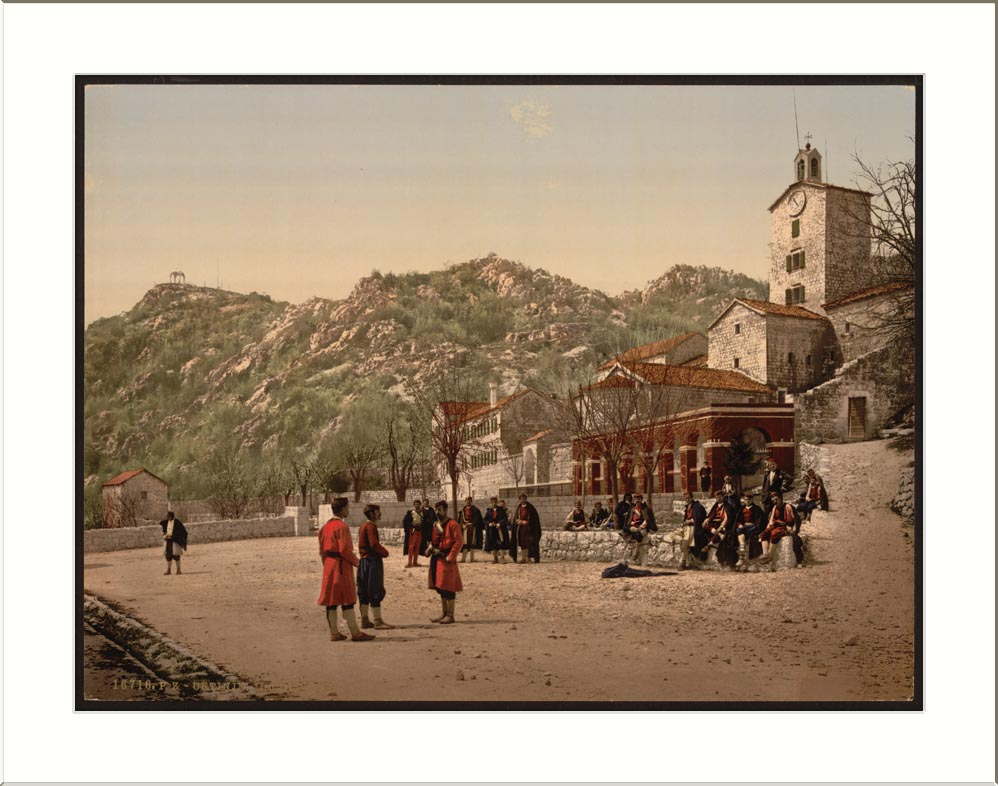
The convent in Cetinje, Old Montenegro in 1889

== Religion and faith ==
Montenegrin society is still very conservative. According to the 2011 census, the vast majority of more than 96% of Montenegrin residents declare themselves as members of some religious organization.

While Eastern Orthodox Christianity is the dominant religious denomination in Montenegro, there are also sizable numbers of adherents of both Catholic Christianity and Islam. The dominant Church is the Serbian Orthodox Church although traces of a forming Montenegrin Orthodox Church are present.

The badnjak is a tree branch or young tree brought into the house and placed on the fire on the evening of Christmas Eve, a central tradition in Eastern Orthodox Christmas celebrations in Montenegro. The tree from which the badnjak is cut, preferably a young and straight Austrian oak, is ceremonially felled early on the morning of Christmas Eve. The felling, preparation, bringing in, and laying on the fire, are surrounded by elaborate rituals, with many regional variations.

== Tradition ==
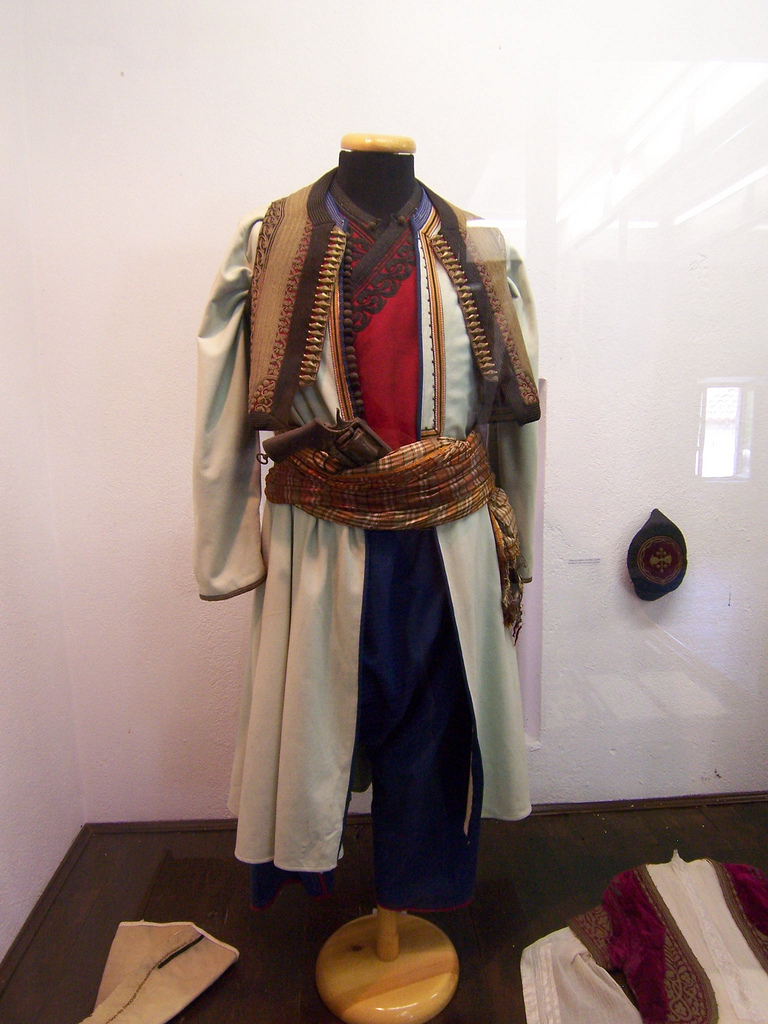
Male folk costume from Montenegro

=== Folk dances ===
The traditional folk dance is a circle dance called kolo, which is common among Montenegrins, Serbs and Macedonians. It is a collective dance, where a group of people (usually several dozen, at the very least three) hold each other by the hands or around the waist dancing, forming a circle (hence the name), semicircle or spiral. It is called Oro (or the "Eagle dance") in Montenegro. Similar circle dances also exist in other cultures of the region.

=== Epic songs ===
Montenegrins' long-standing history of struggle for freedom and independence is invariably linked with strong traditions of oral epic poetry. Traditionally, they are delivered to the audience accompanied by the music produced by a gusle, a one-string instrument played by the storyteller (guslar), who sings or recites the stories of heroes and battles in decasyllabic verse. Historically, these songs have had an immense motivational power over the population. The guslars commanded almost as much respect as the best of warriors, as they were as much the authors, thus history writers, as they were interpreters. Presently, these traditions are somewhat livelier in the northern parts of the country (also shared with people in eastern Herzegovina, western Serbia, and central Dalmatia).

=== Cuisine ===
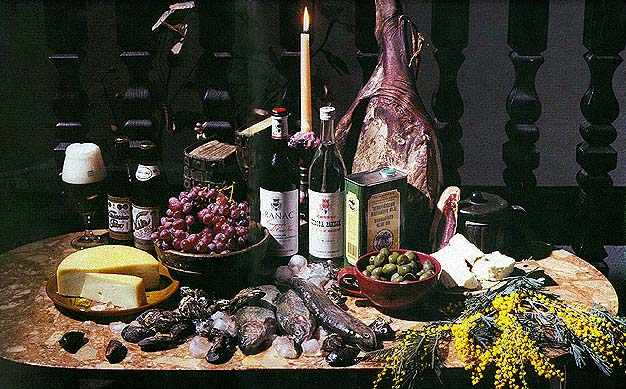
Foods from Montenegro

Montenegrin cuisine is a result of Montenegro's geographic position and its long history. The traditional dishes of Montenegro's heartland, and its Adriatic coast have a distinctively Italian flavour which shows in the style of bread and cheese-making and meat curing, as well as the wines and spirits produced and consumed.

The second large influence came from the Levant and Turkey, sarma, musaka, pilav, pita, burek, ćevapi, kebab, and sweets like baklava and tulumba, etc. Hungarian dishes are represented by goulash, satarash, and djuvech.

== Architecture ==
Montenegro has a number of significant cultural and historical sites, including heritage sites from the pre-Romanesque, Gothic and Baroque periods. The Montenegrin coastal region is especially well known for its religious monuments, mostly related to Venetian architecture, including the Cathedral of Saint Tryphon, the basilica of St. Luke (over 800 years), Our Lady of the Rock (Škrpjela), the Savina Monastery, and others. The ancient city of Cattaro (now called Kotor) is listed on the UNESCO World Heritage list, even as a perfect example of the Venetian architecture. The Byzantine influence in architecture, and in religious artwork is especially apparent in the country's interior.

== Literature ==
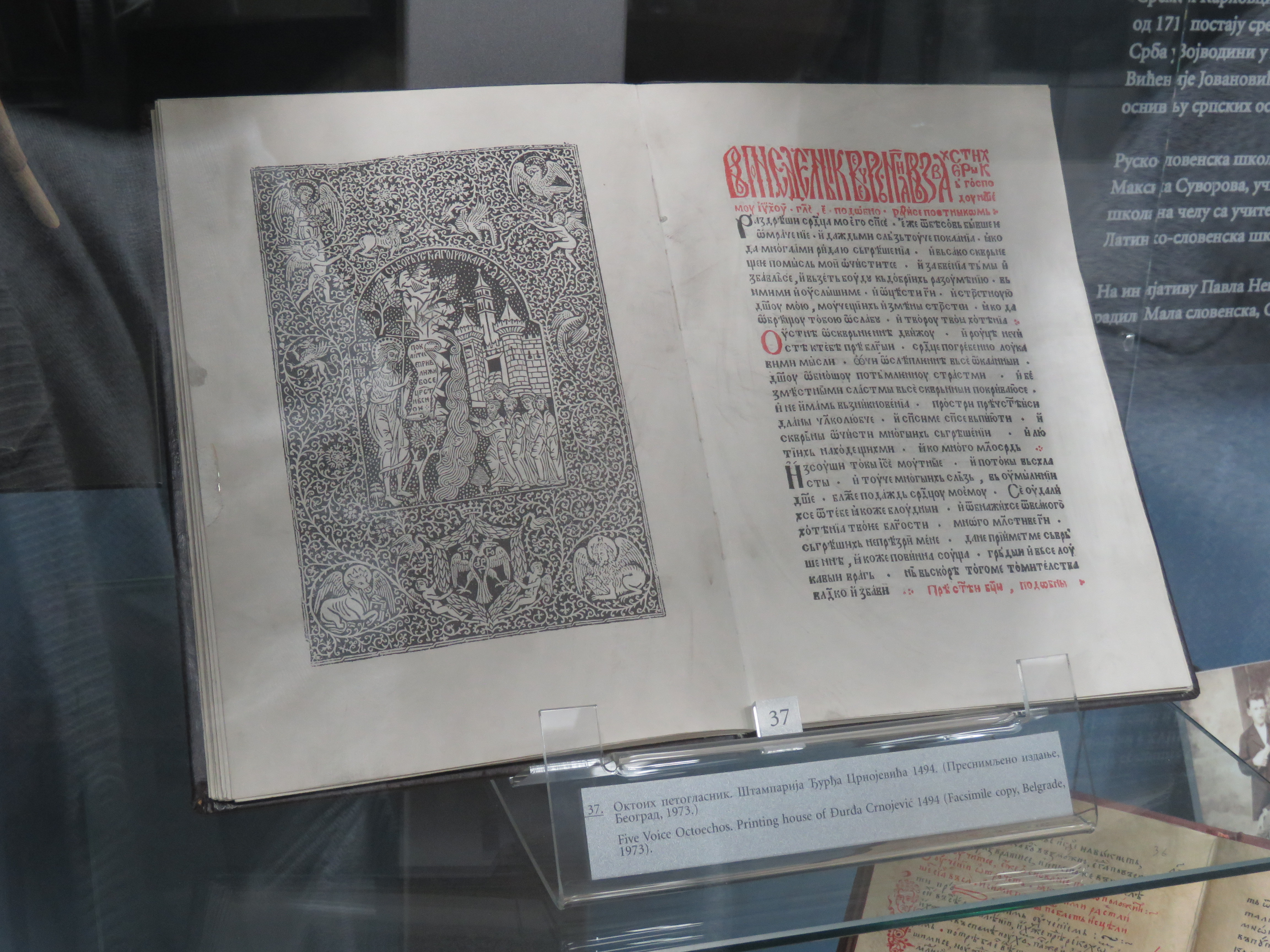
Cetinje Octoechos

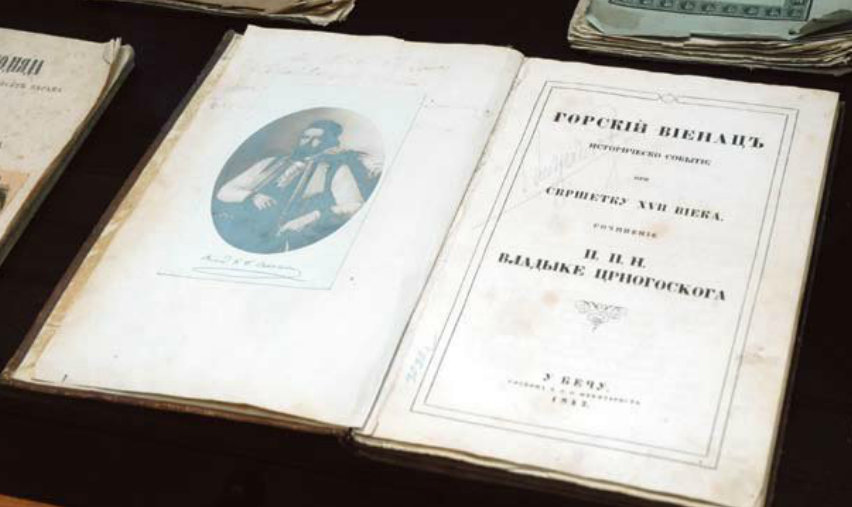
The Mountain Wreath

Montenegrin literature refers to the entire (historical and modern) corpus of literature created in Montenegro, written mainly in Montenegrin, Serbian and other related languages spoken in the country.

=== Characteristics ===
Although there are works written at least 800 years ago (like the Chronicle of the Priest of Duklja), the most important representatives are writers who lived in 19th and 20th century and wrote mainly in Serbian. The first literary works written in the region are ten centuries old, and the first Montenegrin book was printed five hundreds years ago.

In Venetian Cattaro (actual Kotor) there were a group of writers and poets that introduced Renaissance culture in coastal Montenegro, writing in Latin and Italian: Ludovico Pasquali, Giovanni Bona de Boliris, Giovanni Polizza, Giorgio Bisanti, Girolamo Pima, Timoteo Cisilla, Giovanni Crussala, Giuseppe Bronza and Girolamo Panizzola.

The first state-owned printing press (Printing House of Crnojevići) was located in Cetinje in 1494, where the first South Slavic book was printed the same year (Oktoih). A number of medieval manuscripts, dating from the 13th century, are kept in the Montenegrin monasteries. On the substratum of traditional oral folk epic poetry, authors like Petar II Petrović Njegoš have created their own expression. His epic Gorski Vijenac (The Mountain Wreath), written in the Montenegrin vernacular, presents the central point of Montenegrin culture at the time.

=== Notable authors ===
- In 18th and 19th centuries: Petar II Petrović-Njegoš, Andrija Zmajević, Vasilije Petrović-Njegoš, Petar I Petrović-Njegoš, Vuk Vrčević, Stefan Mitrov Ljubiša and Marko Miljanov.
- In 20th century: Mihailo Lalić, Milovan Đilas, Radovan Zogović, Ćamil Sijarić, Čedo Vuković, Mirko Kovač, Dragan Radulović and Vito Nikolić.
- Contemporary authors include: Balša Brković, Borislav Jovanović, Jevrem Brković, Andrej Nikolaidis, Tanja Bakić, Bosiljka Pušić and Dragana Kršenković Brković.

== Painting and sculpture ==
The Faculty of the Fine Arts in Cetinje has helped usher in new talent. Some of the most prominent painters from Montenegro include Milo Milunović, Petar Lubarda, Dado Đurić, Uroš Tošković, Vojo Stanić, Dimitrije Popović, Boris Dragojević and sculptor Risto Stijović.

== Music ==
The music of Montenegro represents a mix of the country's unique musical tradition and Western musical influences. The music of Montenegro has been relatively overlooked, especially in comparison with its literature and visual arts. Nevertheless, the 20th century produced several outstanding composers and interpreters.

=== Historical overview ===
In the 10th and 11th centuries a composer of religious chants (Jovan of Duklja) was the oldest composer known from the Adriatic coast. At the end of the 12th century a script was made, now called Ljetopis Popa Dukljanina, which described the secular use of musical instruments. Seven liturgies from the 15th century, written by a Venetian publisher L.A. Giunta, have been saved at St Clare's church in Kotor. In those centuries the typical music "venetian style" was introduced to coastal Montenegro (then called Albania Veneta).

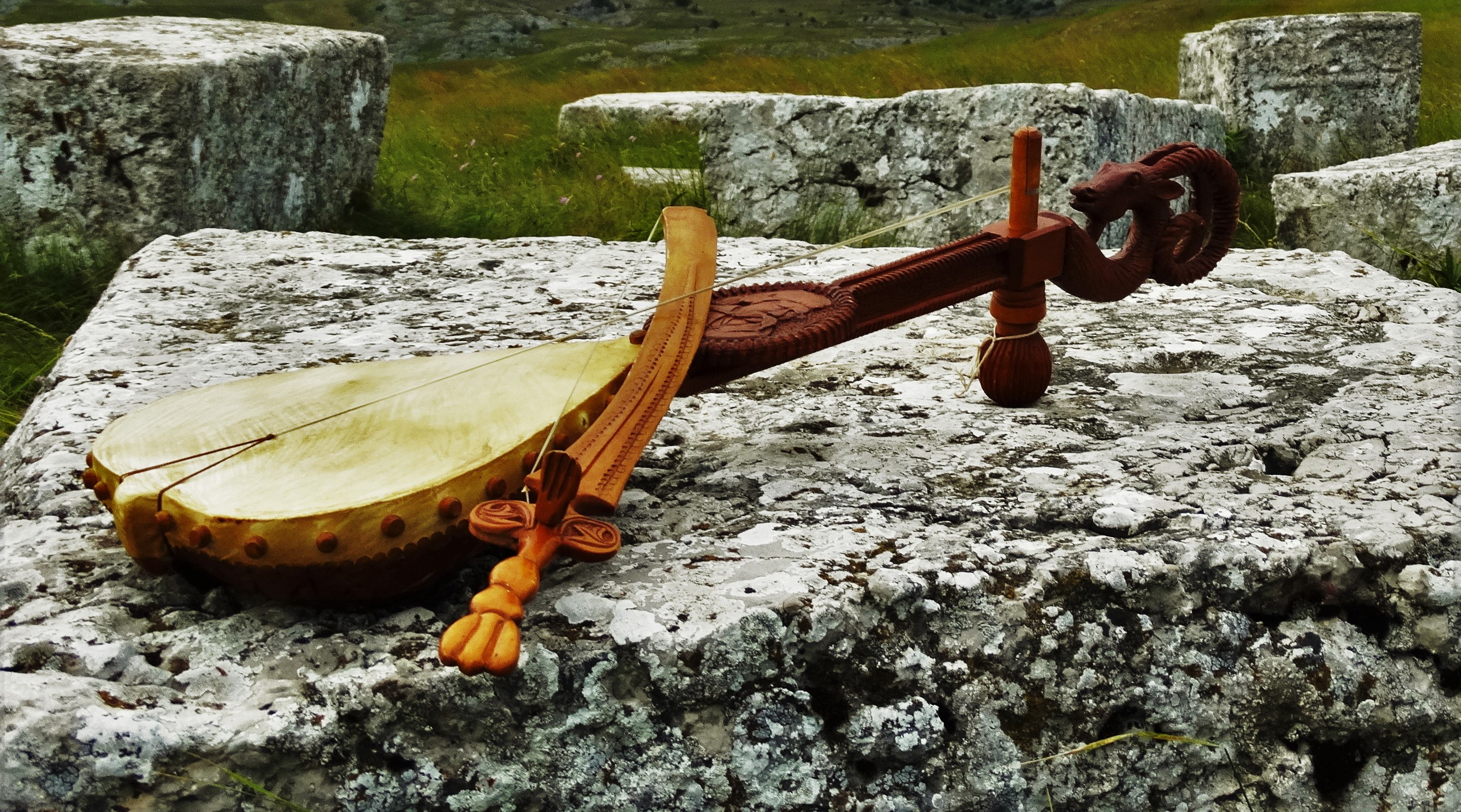
Gusle, traditional folk instrument in Montenegro

Religious music development was sparked in the 19th century, when a Catholic singing academy was opened in Kotor. Also, until the musical renaissance of the 20th century, Montenegrin music was mainly based on the simple traditional instrument, the gusle. The oldest singing society, named "Jedinstvo" was formed in Kotor in 1839. The first music school in Montenegro was founded in 1934 in Cetinje.

==== Traditional music ====
Traditional music heritage is somewhat different in different parts of Montenegro. In traditional music, different styles can be noticed in the Gulf of Kotor area, Old Montenegro and Sanjak regions. Old Montenegro traditional music is based around the traditional instrument, the gusle. The music is mainly vocal, or instrumental-vocal. Many songs are adapted from the epics, and are based on the events and tales from Montenegrin tradition.

==== Classical music ====
Due to the country's turbulent history, filled with defensive wars and constant fighting for freedom, the development of culture, especially music, was a secondary interest for Montenegrins. The first notable Montenegrin composer was Jovan Ivanišević (1860–1889). He composed piano miniatures, orchestra, solo and chorus songs that were performed even in Prague. He died when he was only 29 years old. In the 19th century, there were also many operas with librettos inspired by Montenegro and its culture, like the famous "Balkan Empress". Other prominent 19th-century composers include Aleksa Ivanović and Dragan Milošević, who graduated from Prague music schools.

In the beginning of the 20th century, when music schools were first introduced, and culture started developing faster, Montenegrin music started flourishing. There have been a number of notable classical music composers from Montenegro, especially during the 20th century. In the first half of the century, two musical schools developed: one based in Cetinje, and the other one in Podgorica. An important role in the music development of that time was played by Radio Titograd, which broadcast various music programmes daily, and helped popularise the music. At that time, composers started returning to the roots, introducing many traditional elements in modern compositions. Also, during the 1940s and 1950s, musical schools were opened in Kotor, Podgorica, Cetinje, Tivat, Herceg Novi, Nikšić, Bar, Ulcinj and Berane.

The Argentine composer Mauricio Annunziata, taking possession of the Montenegrin culture, religion and music, produced the cantata Akatist Op. 108, Hymns of Praise to Saint Basil of Ostrog at the Basilica Santa Maria del Popolo in Rome in May 2008, for solo voices, chorus and orchestra, also in version for organ. This concert marked the second anniversary of the Independence of Montenegro and it was held before the entire diplomatic corps accredited to the Holy See and the highest authorities of the Vatican City. The work was hugely successful in the Italian version of the text produced by Dragana Polovič.

Today, Montenegro is known for several award-winning classical guitarists, among them Montenegrin Guitar Duo (Goran Krivokapić and Danijel Cerović) and Miloš Karadaglić.

=== Popular music in Montenegro ===
Probably the best known rock band from Montenegro is Perper from Cetinje. Other notable rock bands include DST (from Nikšić) and Highway, Autogeni Trening, Gospoda Glembajevi and Mikrokozma (from the capital, Podgorica). Rock musicians from Montenegro who were popular throughout the former Yugoslavia include Marinko Pavićević, Miladin Šobić and Rambo Amadeus. While the notable pop singers from Montenegro are Sergej Ćetković, Vanja Radovanović, Slavko Kalezić, Bojan Marović, Knez, Vlado Georgiev, Nina Petković, Andrea Demirović, Stefan Filipović, Nina Žižić, also pop music groups No Name and D mol. There are currently several active rock and pop Festivals in Montenegro, the most notables are Sea Dance Festival, Cetinje Beer Fest, "City Groove" in Podgorica, "Lake" and "Bedem" Fests in Nikšić, and many other summer music festivals. Montenegro also hosts a national music award, the Montefon Awards, organized by the Association of Variety Artists and Performers of Montenegro, which were originally awarded from 2001 to 2007 and revived in 2024. Since 2007, Montenegro has participated in the Eurovision Song Contest as an independent state.

== Performing arts ==
=== Film ===
Considering its population of about 600,000 people, Montenegro has produced a number of outstanding film directors and actors including Dušan Vukotić, the first Yugoslav Oscar winner (for the short animated film category in 1961), Veljko Bulajić, and Živko Nikolić.

Other notable Montenegrin directors and filmmakers include: Krsto Papić, Branko Baletić, Velimir Stojanović, Zdravko Velimirović, Bane Bastać, Predrag Golubović, Krsto Škanata, Milo Đukanović, and perspective filmmakers of new generation Ivan Salatić, Gojko Berkuljan, Marija Perović, Nikola Vukčević, Željko Sošić and Ivona Juka.

In 2013, the Montenegrin film Bad Destiny became the first film from the country to be submitted for the Academy Award for Best Foreign Language Film.

=== Theatre ===
Notable theatres include the Montenegrin National Theatre in Podgorica, the Theatre of Nikšić in Nikšić, and the City Theatre in Podgorica. Montenegrin National Theatre is the only professional theatre and along with the Faculty of Drama, located in Cetinje is responsible for the lion's share of theatre production in the country. During the summer months, the City Theatre in Budva takes precedence as a stage for performers coming from all corners of the former Yugoslavia and the world.

Many scholars believe that the biggest contribution to Montenegrin music in theater was by Dionisio de Sarno San Giorgio, the Italian composer who spent most of his life in the country. His "Balkan Empress" – inspired by the work of King Nikola – received high praise from Italian critics during the second half of the 19th century.

== Montenegro as a theme in foreign works ==
- Croatian poet Ivan Mažuranić wrote a Montenegrin-themed epic poem, The Death of Smail-aga Čengić.
- The 2006 James Bond film Casino Royale is partially set in Montenegro.
- The Great Gatsby by F. Scott Fitzgerald, refers to a decoration which Jay Gatsby received for his war efforts.
- Nero Wolfe, Rex Stout's fictional character, is born in Montenegro.

== Institutions ==
- Montenegrin Academy of Sciences and Arts
- Matica Crnogorska
- University of Montenegro
- Montenegrin PEN Center
- Podgorica Book Fair
- Ministry of Culture of Montenegro
