= Brković =

Brkovic (Serbian: Брковић) is a surname. Notable people with the surname include:

- Irfan Brkovic (born 1986), Bosnian artist
- Ahmet Brković (born 1974), Croatian footballer
- Balša Brković (born 1966), Montenegrin writer, essayist and theatre critic
- Danijal Brković (born 1991), Bosnian-American footballer
- Dragana Kršenković Brković, writer from Montenegro
- Dušan Brković (born 1989), Serbian footballer
- Jevrem Brković (born 1933), Montenegrin writer (poet, novelist, journalist), historian and a cultural activist
- Mićo Brković (born 1968), cyclist

== See also ==
- Brkić
