= Danijel Cerović =

Montenegrin classical guitarist

- Born: Nikšić, Montenegro
- Genre: Classical
- Instrument: Guitar
- Label: Naxos Records
- Website: danijelcerovic.com

Danijel Cerović (Montenegrin Cyrillic: Данијел Церовић) is a Montenegrin classical guitarist. He lectures in guitar and chamber music at the Music Academy in Cetinje, University of Montenegro, and is a guest lecturer at the Sarajevo Music Academy.

== Biography ==
Cerović graduated from the Faculty of Music Arts in Belgrade in the class of Professor Vera Ogrizović, and completed his master's studies in guitar at the Conservatorium Maastricht in the class of Professor Carlo Marchione. His repertoire includes transcriptions of Renaissance and Baroque music and original compositions from the nineteenth and twentieth centuries, with an emphasis on contemporary music written for guitar and ensembles with guitar.

He is a member of the Montenegrin Guitar Duo with guitarist Goran Krivokapić. The duo's recordings of J. S. Bach's English Suites, arranged for two guitars, have received reviews from independent classical-music publications. Classical Net published a review of the first volume, discussing the duo's approach to the arrangements and their performances. The WholeNote reviewed the second volume, Bach's English Suites Nos. 4–6, and praised the duo's transcriptions and playing, noting their accuracy, agility, articulation, definition and clarity. Naxos released the second volume in 2018, crediting Cerović and Krivokapić as arrangers and performers.

In 2026, the Montenegrin Guitar Duo released Bach: French Suites, featuring Cerović and Krivokapić performing their arrangements for two guitars of Johann Sebastian Bach's French Suites Nos. 1–3, BWV 812–814.

His debut recording, featuring works by Carlo Domeniconi, Astor Piazzolla and Dušan Bogdanović, was released in 2013 by MMC Records.

In 2020, Naxos Records released Cerović's solo recording Lute Works, consisting of music by Silvius Leopold Weiss arranged for guitar. The recording includes Weiss's Lute Sonatas Nos. 28 and 29 and several other works. The album received independent critical coverage. Review Corner reviewed the recording in August 2020, discussing Cerović's selection of Weiss's works and describing the music as well played.

Cerović has performed internationally as a soloist and chamber musician. A 2025 Guiting Music Festival programme described him as an internationally acclaimed recording artist and touring musician and noted his teaching positions at the Music Academy in Cetinje and Sarajevo Music Academy.

He is the artistic director of the Montenegro International Guitar Competition, which is part of the EuroStrings Festival.

== Discography ==
BACH, J.S.: English Suites Nos. 1-3 (arr. Montenegrin Guitar Duo for 2 guitars) (Montenegrin Guitar Duo) (Arranged and performed by Danijel Cerović and Goran Krivokapić, Montenegrin Guitar Duo.)

- Released: 09/2015
- Label: Naxos Records
- Tracks: "English Suite No. 1 in A Major, BWV 806", "English Suite No. 2 in A Minor, BWV 807", "English Suite No. 3 in G Minor, BWV 808"

BACH, J.S.: English Suites Nos. 4-6 (arr. Montenegrin Guitar Duo for 2 guitars) (Montenegrin Guitar Duo) (Arranged and performed by Danijel Cerović and Goran Krivokapić, Montenegrin Guitar Duo.)

- Released: 05/2018
- Label: Naxos Records
- Tracks: "English Suite No. 4 in F Major, BWV 809", "English Suite No. 5 in E Minor, BWV 810", "English Suite No. 6 in D Minor, BWV 811"

WEISS, S.L.: Lute Works (arr. D. Cerović for guitar) (D. Cerović) (Arranged and performed by Danijel Cerović.)

- Released: 08/2020
- Label: Naxos Records
- Tracks: "Capriccio in D Major", "Lute Sonata No. 29 in A Minor, L'Infidèle", "Tombeau sur la mort de M. Comte de Logy", "Passacaglia in D Major", "Tombeau sur la mort de M. Cajetan Baron d'Hartig", "Fantasia in C Minor", "Lute Sonata No. 28 in F Major, Le fameux Corsaire"

BACH, J.S.: French Suites Nos. 1-3 (arr. Montenegrin Guitar Duo for 2 guitars) (Montenegrin Guitar Duo) (Arranged and performed by Danijel Cerović and Goran Krivokapić, Montenegrin Guitar Duo.)

- Released: 08/2026
- Label: Red Poppy Records
- Tracks: "French Suite No. 1 in D Minor, BWV 812", "French Suite No. 2 in C Minor, BWV 813", "French Suite No. 3 in B Minor, BWV 814"
