= Ojha (expression) =

Montenegrin interjection

Ojha or oj-ha (Montenegrin: ојха) is a common Montenegrin emotional expression and interjection used in Montenegro. It is frequently used during celebrations such as weddings or traditional dancing. It is closely linked to Montenegrin culture and the ethnogenesis of Montenegrins, often used in songs about the country or its people as well as topics concerning Montenegrins, used to convey excitement or ironic mockery.
