= Jelena Manja Radulović-Vulić =

Montenegrin musicologist (1936-2007)

- Born: 29 April 1936; Cetinje, Yugoslavia
- Died: 18 August 2007 (aged 71); Podgorica, Montenegro
- Occupations: Musicologist; television producer; television personality
- Awards: Associate member of the Montenegrin Academy of Sciences and Arts (2003)

Academic background
- Education: University of Belgrade Faculty of Philology; Belgrade Academy of Music

Academic work
- Discipline: Musicology
- Institutions: University of Montenegro Music Academy

Jelena Manja Radulović-Vulić (29 April 1936 – 18 August 2007) was a Montenegrin musicologist, television producer, and personality. After studying in Paris, she served as music editor at Radio Titograd and Titograd TV starting in 1967, winning awards for her work, and she worked as a television personality. She wrote hundreds of publications related to musicology and music criticism, including the three-volume Drevne muzičke kulture Crne Gore. She co-founded the University of Montenegro Music Academy, where she was dean and a full professor.

== Biography ==
Jelena Manja Radulović-Vulić was born on 29 April 1936 in Cetinje, where she was raised. After graduation from a music school in Podgorica (then Titograd), she graduated from the University of Belgrade Faculty of Philology (where she studied French language and literature) and Belgrade Academy of Music. From 1961 to 1964, she worked as a lecturer at the Pedagogical Academy in Nikšić. She was also based in Paris, where she studied medieval music at the University of Paris and, under a French government scholarship piano under Vlado Perlemuter, performing the instrument at places like the Salle Cortot.

In 1967, Radulović-Vulić became music editor at Radio Titograd; she held the position until 1974, when she moved to Titograd TV to become its first music editor. She received both first place at the Yugoslav Television Festival in Bled and the "December 19th" Award for her work on the programme In the Footsteps of a Poetess and a television series on Frederic Chopin, respectively. Starting in 1979, she hosted a show with French cellist André Navarra, which aired on several European television networks such as ORTF. Her performance as a pianist were either as a soloist or accompanist.

Radulović-Vulić was also a part-time professor at the Secondary School of Music in Titograd and a co-founder of the Music Youth of Montenegro. In 1980, she co-founded the Academy of Music in Titograd (now the University of Montenegro Music Academy), where she became a full professor in 1988 and, from 1980 to 1989 and from 1992 to 1994, served as dean before being promoted to head of postgraduate studies in 1998. In 1986, she became the president of the Montenegrin Academy of Sciences and Arts' Committee for Musical Arts.

Radulović-Vulić wrote hundreds of publications related to musicology and music criticism, including newspapers, magazines, and journals. She was a frequent contributor to the Encyclopedia of Yugoslavia and the Leksikon jugoslavenske muzike. In 2002, she published the two-volume Drevne muzičke kulture Crne Gore with the University of Montenegro and the Academy of Music; a third volume, which covered the later half of the Middle Ages and the early Modern era was posthumously published in 2009.

Radulović-Vulić served as president of several associations, namely the Associations of Music Artists of Yugoslavia, the Association of Music Artists of Montenegro, the Association of Music Educators of Montenegro, and the Association of Yugoslav Academies of Music. She was also involved in the Matica crnogorska, Montenegrin National Theatre, and Montenegrin PEN Center as a member. She received several awards, such as the 1974 Oktoih Award, the Thirteenth of July Award in 1981, and the Plaque of the University of Montenegro in 1994. On 12 December 2003, she was elected to the Montenegrin Academy of Sciences and Arts as an associate member.

Radulović-Vulić died on 18 August 2007 in Podgorica.

== Works ==
- Drevne muzičke kulture Crne Gore (2002/2009)
