= Music Academy =

Music Academy may refer to:

- Music Academy (journal), a Russian peer-reviewed academic journal about music
- Music Academy of the West, a classical music training program in Montecito, California
- Music school, an educational institution specialized in the study, training, and research of music

== See also ==
- Baku Academy of Music
- Franz Liszt Academy of Music
- City of Basel Music Academy
- Estonian Academy of Music and Theatre
- Gheorghe Dima National Music Academy
- Madras Music Academy
- Lithuanian Academy of Music and Theatre
- Red Bull Music Academy
- Sarajevo Music Academy
- University of Montenegro Music Academy
- Academy of Music, University of Zagreb
