= Radoje Pajović =

Yugoslav and Montenegrin historian (1934–2019)

- Радоје Пајовић
- Born: 14 April 1934; Drenovštica, Nikšić, Zeta Banovina, Kingdom of Yugoslavia
- Died: 2 June 2019 (aged 85)
- Occupation: Historian
- Years active: 1957–1997
- Notable work: Kontrarevolucija u Crnoj Gori: četnički i federalistički pokret 1941–1945; Pavle Đurišić: kontroverzni četnički vojvoda; Crna Gora kroz istoriju

Radoje Pajović (14 April 1934 – 2 June 2019) was a Yugoslav and Montenegrin historian who worked at the Institute of History at the University of Montenegro for forty years. He has been dubbed "the most prominent Montenegrin historian" of events in Montenegro during World War II by the Montenegrin historian Srđa Pavlović, and Professor Kenneth Morrison, author of the 2009 book Montenegro: A Modern History, asserts that Pajović is one of the most prominent Montenegrin historians in general.

Pajović received the "13 July Award" from the National Assembly of Montenegro and the "19 December Award" from the city of Titograd, the capital of Montenegro. His most notable works are Kontrarevolucija u Crnoj Gori: četnički i federalistički pokret 1941–1945 [Counterrevolution in Montenegro: The Chetnik and Federalist Movements 1941–1945], published in 1977; Pavle Đurišić: kontroverzni četnički vojvoda [Pavle Đurišić: Controversial Chetnik Commander], first published in 1987 and then supplemented and expanded and re-published in 2005; and Crna Gora kroz istoriju [Montenegro Through History], also published in 2005. He was the author or co-author of twelve books and the editor of more than twenty, and he published around one hundred articles and other contributions. In the 1990s, some historians attempted to rehabilitate the World War II Chetniks who collaborated with the Axis powers; Pajović was among the historians who opposed this politically motivated historical revisionism. Towards the end of his academic career and in retirement, Pajović was a vocal advocate for Montenegrin independence and identity.

== Early life, education and family ==
Radoje Pajović was born on 14 April 1934 in the village of Drenovštica in the Nikšić municipality of Zeta Banovina in the Kingdom of Yugoslavia, the son of Ilija and Stana (née Perunović). He did not remember his mother because she died when he was young. His father later married a woman named Ljubica. He completed elementary school in Drenovštica. His family was actively involved in the anti-fascist struggle in Montenegro during World War II, and in his childhood he associated himself closely with the movement on an emotional level.

Pajović completed high school in Nikšić, then in 1957 he commenced studying at the Department of History at the University of Belgrade Faculty of Philosophy. He spent a year working in the archives of the Central Committee of the League of Communists of Montenegro, before commencing work the following year for the Institute of History at the Pedagogical College in Cetinje (later the Faculty of Philosophy, University of Montenegro). He received his doctorate from the University of Belgrade in 1970, and his doctoral dissertation was entitled Četnički federalistički pokret u Crnoj Gori 1941–1945 [The Chetnik Federalist Movement in Montenegro 1941–1945]. Pajović married a woman named Ljilja and they had two children: a daughter, Tanja, and a son, Neven. Ljilja died in 2013 and the loss affected him a great deal.

== Career ==
Pajović worked at the Institute of History for forty years from 1958 until his retirement in 1997. He mainly concentrated on the modern history of Montenegro, specialising in World War II, and was "highly respected both at home and abroad", according to the historian Marijan Mašo Miljić, head of the Archives of the Historical Institute of Montenegro at the University of Montenegro. In his later career, Pajović explored the earlier history of Montenegro, including the medieval Duklja state and Zeta province. He authored or co-authored twelve books, the most notable of which were Kontrarevolucija u Crnoj Gori: četnički i federalistički pokret 1941–1945 [Counterrevolution in Montenegro: The Chetnik and Federalist Movements 1941–1945] published in 1977, Pavle Đurišić: kontroverzni četnički vojvoda [Pavle Đurišić: Controversial Chetnik Duke], first published in 1987 and then supplemented and expanded and re-published in 2005, and Crna Gora kroz istoriju [Montenegro Throughout History] also published in 2005. The first two works have been particularly valued by historians. The prolific Yugoslav and Serbian historian Branko Petranović observed that Pajović's 1977 book was an "important analytical study" in Montenegrin historiography, the broadest examination to that point in time of the counter-revolutionary forces in Montenegro during World War II, and that it left no doubt about the motives and collaboration of Chetniks and separatists in Montenegro during the war. The historian Kenneth Morrison, Professor of Modern Southeast European History at De Montfort University, described Pajović's book on Đurišić as an "excellent analysis".

Pajović also edited more than twenty books, published around one hundred articles and other contributions, and according to Miljić he made a "significant contribution to Montenegrin historiography". He participated in the writing of the history of the League of Communists of Yugoslavia and the history of the League of Communists of Montenegro. Pajović was the president of the Association of Historians of Montenegro and also a member of the presidency of the Association of Historians of Yugoslavia. He was also a member of many expert panels, committees and commissions. The recipient of many awards, Pajović received the "19 December Award" in 1977 from the city of Titograd, the capital of the Socialist Republic of Montenegro, and the "13 July Award" the following year from the National Assembly of Montenegro for his contributions to science. (Note: The concept of "historical science" as providing "definite analysis and evaluation" of events and personalities using arguments and explanations in the "spirit of science" was a facet of socialist ideology in the former Yugoslavia.) He was a founding member of the Doclean Academy of Sciences and Arts, Matica crnogorska and Montenegrin PEN during the difficult period of the breakup of Yugoslavia. According to Miljić, as an academic Pajović made a major contribution to the Institute of History during his time there.

== Views on Montenegrin independence and identity ==
Pajović belonged to a group of Montenegrin historians who consistently advocated for the independence of Montenegro and affirmed Montenegrin ethnicity. Montenegro had had centuries of largely autonomous existence under the Ottoman Empire before becoming fully independent in 1878, but expansion into areas surrounding "Old Montenegro" – an area around Cetinje largely free of Ottoman incursions which developed specific Montenegrin characteristics – meant that significant parts of the population in the new areas of the state did not closely identify with Montenegrin statehood or identity, many identifying as Serbs or Muslims rather than as Montenegrins. In late 1918, Montenegro was unified with the Kingdom of Serbia and soon after, the Kingdom of Serbs, Croats and Slovenes (KSHS, Yugoslavia from 1929), and Montenegrin opposition to the union was crushed. Pajović wrote that Montenegro had been violently annexed by the Kingdom of Serbia in 1918, a position supported by the Montenegrin historian Srđa Pavlović, adjunct professor and research associate at the Wirth Institute for Austrian and Central European Studies at the University of Alberta, in his 2018 book Balkan Anschluss: The Annexation of Montenegro and the Creation of the Common South Slavic State.

Pajović also claimed that historical evidence confirms the existence of an autocephalous (Note: Autocephaly means that a church is independent of external and especially patriarchal authority.) Montenegrin Orthodox Church (CPC), and that it had been unlawfully abolished by force by Prince Regent Alexander of Yugoslavia in 1920. This forms part of an argument between proponents of a separate Montenegrin church and those who oppose it in favour of the wider Serbian Orthodox Church (SPC). This was examined by František Šístek, assistant professor at the Institute of International Studies, Faculty of Social Sciences, Charles University in Prague, Czech Republic, in 2011. Šístek observes that after the Serbian Patriarchate of Peć was abolished by the Ottomans in 1766, Montenegro – which remained beyond effective Ottoman control – became a de facto sovereign territory, with all ecclesiastical power in the hands of the hereditary prince-bishops who ruled Montenegro. At this point, proponents of the autocephaly of the CPC claim the church, which had already enjoyed de facto independence for a considerable time, fulfilled all the canonical conditions for autocephaly. The CPC was also defined as autocephalous by several Montenegrin laws around the end of the nineteenth century and beginning of the twentieth century. The SPC and its supporters claim that the abolition of the patriarchate of Peć was unlawful and uncanonical and therefore the re-establishment of the SPC as the only Orthodox church in Montenegro in 1920 was merely a revival of the unlawfully abolished patriarchate. In turn, the supporters of the CPC claim that its own abolition in 1920 was illegal and invalid and that its autocephalous status remains valid. According to the Office of International Religious Freedom, United States Department of State (OIRF), the 2011 census indicated that approximately 72 per cent of Montenegro's population was Orthodox, but the census did not differentiate between adherents of the two churches, and there is no consensus on the estimates of numbers of their adherents. Data from 2020 collected by the non-governmental organisation the Center for Democracy and Human Rights indicates that about 90 per cent of the Orthodox population of Montenegro is associated with the SPC, with the remainder associated with the CPC. The Montenegrin government asserts that adherence to the CPC is higher than this data indicates.

During the interwar period Montenegrin political parties and identity were brutally suppressed by the KSHS/Yugoslav authorities. Yugoslavia was invaded and partitioned by the Axis powers during World War II and Montenegro was occupied by Fascist Italy. After the outbreak of resistance directed towards the occupiers, a civil war raged across Yugoslavia during World War II between the communist-led Partisans and those aligned with the Axis powers. In Montenegro, the latter included the pro-independence Greens and the Serb-chauvinist Chetniks. By November 1944, the Italians had capitulated and the Partisans had wrested control of Montenegro from the Germans and the collaborationist forces. Pajović has been praised for his objective writing about collaboration with the Axis powers in Montenegro during World War II, which is absent any bias despite his family's active involvement in the struggle against fascism. (Note: Perošević wrote, "Rjetkost je da neko ko je iz partizanske porodice, ko je emotivno i kao dijete osjećao taj pokret kao svoj, emotivno piše ali bez ostrašćenosti o protivničkoj ideologiji." [It is rare that someone who came from a partisan family, and who closely identified with that movement as a child, wrote about the opposing ideology with emotion but not anger.]) During the 1990s, in the countries that emerged from the dissolution of Yugoslavia, a politically motivated popular trend in historiography was the historical rehabilitation of World War II figures who collaborated with the Axis powers and were involved in massacres of civilians during the war. Pajović was one of the historians who refused to engage in historical revisionism in favour of the collaborationist Chetniks. When reflecting on the political struggles that followed, he fiercely opposed any attempt to rehabilitate the Chetniks and those that pursued Greater Serbia policies more broadly. These included attempts to erect monuments in honor of Puniša Račić and Pavle Đurišić. Račić was a Montenegrin Serb politician during the interwar period who murdered three and wounded two more Croat politicians on the floor of the National Assembly of the Kingdom of Serbs, Croats and Slovenes in June 1928, and Đurišić was an Axis collaborator who carried out many massacres in the Sandzak region of Montenegro during World War II. Pajović also criticised the 2015 rehabilitation by the Serbian Supreme Court of the World War II Chetnik leader Draža Mihailović which, based on the evidence, Pajović considered unfounded.

In 2012, the Montenegrin historian Nebojša Čagorović asserted the need for a reassessment of the history of the interaction between anti-fascism and Montenegrin identity. At the conclusion of World War II, thousands of Chetniks and other collaborationist troops from Montenegro were captured by the Partisans as they attempted to escape from Yugoslav territory to surrender to the Western Allies. These troops were killed by the Partisans in what the historian Jozo Tomasevich describes as "preventative defense" and an "act of mass terror and brutal political surgery, similar to that practised by the [Chetniks] earlier in the war". In a paper published in the journal History, Čagorović criticised Pajović for stating, in reference to these crimes, "committing evil in order to be protected from it, is not evil at all".

After World War II, Montenegro was established as a socialist republic within a federated Yugoslavia, which muted many of those who had promoted a separate Montenegrin identity, but Serb-nationalist ideas remained below the surface outside the region around Cetinje. From the mid-1970s, greater autonomy for the constituent republics of Yugoslavia resulted in the development of a stronger and more distinct Montenegrin identity including the establishment of Montenegrin cultural institutions. In the 1980s, Serbian nationalism was on the rise, with claims that Montenegrins were a branch of the Serb nation, and in fact that they were, "the best of Serbs". This occurred in the context of an economic crisis which enveloped Yugoslavia during the 1980s and undermined the legitimacy of the Montenegrin branch of the Yugoslav communist party, which Serbian nationalists in Montenegro exploited in late 1988 and early 1989 to take control. When Croatia declared independence in 1991, Yugoslav troops from Montenegro, supported by Montenegrin reservists and the Montenegrin government, besieged and attacked Dubrovnik, a UNESCO World Heritage Site, to widespread international condemnation. After briefly trying to take a line independent of the Serbian government of Slobodan Milošević, Montenegro became a constituent but subordinate part of a federation of Serbia and Montenegro known as the Federal Republic of Yugoslavia, which became the political union of Serbia and Montenegro in 2003. Montenegro became a fully independent country following the 2006 referendum which supported independence by a slim majority.

Pajović advocated for Montenegro to be a "free, civil democratic, socially just and multi-religious and multicultural society". In January 2019, Pajović stated that Serbian clero-nationalist circles were spreading false information claiming that the human rights of Serbs in Montenegro were in danger. He condemned as gross and false propaganda the 2019 assertion by the Patriarch of the Serbian Orthodox Church, Irinej, that the situation of Serbs in Montenegro was worse than in the genocidal Independent State of Croatia during World War II. Pajović also condemned the insults by Amfilohije, the Serbian Orthodox Metropolitan of Montenegro, about Montenegrins who asserted their Montenegrin identity, in which Amfilohije stated that such people were "bastards" of the World War II Montenegrin communist and Partisan leader Milovan Djilas. Amfilohije also described these Montenegrins as "oxen" and "faeces". Pajović accused the same clero-nationalist groups of historical revisionism against the anti-fascist struggle in Montenegro and its legacy.

== Death and legacy ==
Pajović died suddenly on 2 June 2019, aged 85, and was buried the following day at the Čepurci cemetery in Podgorica. In December 2019, the Association of Fighters and Anti-Fascists in Nikšić organised a tribute to Pajović, led by the historian Živko Andrijašević. Andrijašević – the author of the standard historical dictionary of Montenegro, Istorijski Leksikon Crne Gore – stated that Pajović's most significant work was his 1977 book Kontrarevolucija u Crnoj Gori: četnički i federalistički pokret 1941–1945 [Counterrevolution in Montenegro: The Chetnik and Federalist Movements 1941–1945], and asserted that its conclusions had stood the test of time. This has subsequently been echoed by Nada Tomović – head of the history department at the University of Montenegro – who referred to the book as a "masterpiece". Andrijašević went on to say that Pajović did not modify his historical conclusions for political purposes, but remained true to the facts. At the same event, Adnan Prekić – assistant professor of history at the University of Montenegro – stated that no-one explained Yugoslav political movements during the interwar period and World War II as well as Pajović. Andrijašević concluded by decrying the fact that the event had to be organised by the Association of Fighters and Anti-Fascists and not by the Institute of History. He continued, condemning Pajović's former colleagues at the Institute who specialised in World War II history for not attending the event, stating that this was indicative of a malaise within the study and teaching of history in Montenegro.

According to Miljić, Pajović's historical work constitutes a significant legacy. Pajović has been acknowledged by Pavlović as "the most prominent Montenegrin historian" of the events of World War II in Montenegro. (Note: According to Pavlović's review of Elizabeth Roberts' 2007 book Realm of the Black Mountain: A History of Montenegro, "when it comes to analyzing Montenegro during World War Two there is no mention of the scholarly works of the most prominent Montenegrin historian of this period, Radoje Pajović. As a consequence, Roberts glances over the very sensitive issue of the collaboration between Krsto Popović, the former leader of the independent-minded Greens, and the Italian occupying force, limiting the analysis to a single explanatory footnote.") Morrison, author of the 2009 book Montenegro: A Modern History asserts that Pajović is one of the most prominent Montenegrin historians in general.

== Selected bibliography ==
Pajović's works were published in both the Cyrillic and Latin scripts of Serbo-Croatian throughout the former Yugoslavia and its successor states.

=== As sole author ===
- Kontrarevolucija u Crnoj Gori: Četnički i federalistički pokret, 1941–1945 [The Counter-revolution in Montenegro: The Chetnik and Federalist Movements, 1941–1945]. Iz prošlosti Crne Gore [From Montenegro's Past] (in Serbo-Croatian). Cetinje, Yugoslavia: Obod. 1977. OCLC 5351995.
- Pavle Đurišić: kontroverzni četnički vojvoda [Pavle Đurišić: Controversial Chetnik Duke] (in Serbo-Croatian). Zagreb, Yugoslavia: Centar za informacije i publicitet. 1987. ISBN 978-86-7125-006-1.
- Pavle Đurišić: kontroverzni četnički vojvoda [Pavle Đurišić: Controversial Chetnik Duke] (in Serbo-Croatian). Podgorica, Montenegro: Grafo Crna Gora. 2005. ISBN 978-86-85499-01-2.
- Crna Gora kroz istoriju [Montenegro Throughout History]. Edicija Svjedočanstva [Testimonial Edition] (in Serbo-Croatian). Cetinje, Montenegro: Obod. 2005. OCLC 234157553.

=== As co-author ===
- Lakić, Zoran; Pajović, Radoje; Vukmanović, Gojko (1963). Narodnooslobodilačka borba u Crnoj gori: 1941–1945 chronologija događaja [The National Liberation Struggle in Montenegro: 1941–1945: Chronology of Events] (in Serbo-Croatian). Titograd, Yugoslavia: Istorijski Institut SR Crne Gore. OCLC 1090344538.
- Marković, Vlado; Pajović, Radoje (1996). Saradnja četnika sa okupatorom u Crnoj Gori: dokumenti 1941–1945 [Chetnik Cooperation with the Occupier in Montenegro: Documents 1941–1945] (in Serbo-Croatian). Podgorica, Yugoslavia: Istorijski Institut Republike Crne Gore. OCLC 43226152.
