= Zoran Lakić =

Montenegrin historian (1933–2022)

Zoran Lakić (Serbian Cyrillic: Зоран Лакић; 31 October 1933 – 20 December 2022) was a Montenegrin historian who was a member of the Montenegrin Academy of Sciences and Arts.

Lakić was born on 31 October 1933. He died on 20 December 2022, at the age of 89.
