= Montenegrin Guitar Duo =

Montenegrin classical duo

- Origin: Montenegro
- Genres: Classical
- Years active: 2005–present
- Label: Naxos Records
- Members: Goran Krivokapić, Danijel Cerović
- Website: https://montenegringuitarduo.com/

The Montenegrin Guitar Duo is a Montenegrin duo formed in 2005. It is composed of classical guitarists Goran Krivokapić and Danijel Cerović.

In 2013 their debut CD was published by the Montenegrin Music Centre; the recording features works by Domeniconi, Piazzolla and Bogdanović. Naxos Records subsequently released two volumes of J. S. Bach's English Suites, transcribed by the duo for two guitars, in 2015 and 2018.

The duo's recordings have received coverage in independent classical-music publications. Classical Net published a review of their recording of Bach's English Suites Nos. 1–3, discussing the duo's arrangements and performances in detail. The WholeNote reviewed the second volume, Bach's English Suites Nos. 4–6, and provided substantial commentary on the duo's transcriptions and playing. This Is Classical Guitar also featured the duo performing their arrangement of Bach's English Suite No. 3 and commented on the performance's rhythmic drive, articulation, phrasing and balance. All Classical Guitar published a later review of the first volume, discussing the duo's arrangements and performances of Bach's music for two guitars.

The duo has also performed internationally at concert halls and festivals. BBC Radio 3 broadcast a performance by the duo on Classical Live in September 2024, recorded at the Vojvodina Guitar Festival in Serbia, featuring Bach's French Suite No. 1, Piazzolla's Suite Troileana and music by Manuel de Falla. The Ohrid Summer Festival published a review of the duo's 2022 concert, praising their performance and describing them as a highly synchronized chamber ensemble.

In 2026, the duo released Bach: French Suites, a recording of Johann Sebastian Bach's French Suites Nos. 1–3, BWV 812–814, arranged for two guitars.

== Discography ==
- BACH, J.S.: English Suites Nos. 1-3 (arr. Montenegrin Guitar Duo for 2 guitars) (Montenegrin Guitar Duo)
- BACH, J.S.: English Suites Nos. 4-6 (arr. Montenegrin Guitar Duo for 2 guitars) (Montenegrin Guitar Duo)
- BACH, J.S.: French Suites Nos. 1-3 (arr. Montenegrin Guitar Duo for 2 guitars) (Montenegrin Guitar Duo)
