= Podgorica Book Fair =

The Podgorica Book Fair is annual event held in Podgorica, Montenegro, established in 2006 by the Montenegrin Ministry of Culture and Podgorica Municipality. The fair offers writing workshops and there is a section dedicated to children, featuring activities such as book readings, puppet shows, and educational games.

== See also ==
- Culture of Montenegro
