= Vojo Stanić =

Montenegrin painter and sculptor (1924–2024)

Vojislav Stanić
- Војислав Станић
- Born: 3 February 1924; Podgorica, Kingdom of Serbs, Croats and Slovenes
- Died: 19 November 2024 (aged 100)
- Citizenship: Montenegro
- Education: Academy of Fine Arts of Belgrade
- Occupations: Painter, Sculptor

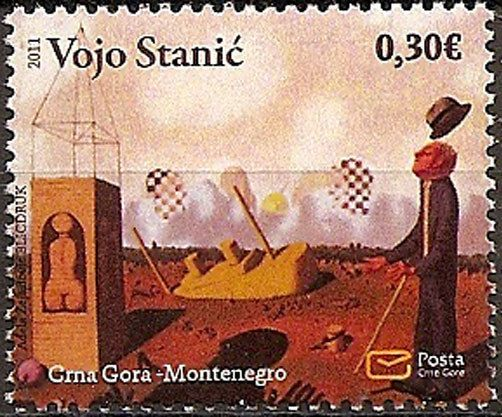
Painting by Stanić on a 2011 Montenegrin stamp

Vojislav "Vojo" Stanić (Montenegrin Cyrillic: Војислав Војо Станић; 3 February 1924 – 19 November 2024) was a Montenegrin painter and sculptor.

== Biography ==
Vojo Stanić was born in Podgorica, and grew up in Nikšić. He completed Academy of Sculpture in Belgrade, after which he moved to Herceg Novi.

During that time he turned to painting, enabling him to better express his peace-loving Mediterranean spirit and interest in people. His paintings are small drama stories from everyday life, full of spirit. They bring back to life the spirit of Renaissance comedies, presenting human weaknesses and at the same time he shows understanding for them. Topics from cafes, sea, or home are often a mixture of surreal details or imaginative relationships of characters and objects.

Stanić remained one of the most important modern Montenegrin painters, and was a member of CANU and DANU. He had several individual exhibits. The most important exhibit of his was at Venice Biennale in 1997.

His paintings are exhibited in a number of galleries in Montenegro, as well as in the permanent exhibit in the Art Museum in Cetinje.

Stanić turned 100 on 3 February 2024, and died on 19 November of the same year.
