= Brkić =

Brkić (Croatian pronunciation: [bř̩ːkitɕ], Serbian pronunciation: [bř̩ːkitɕ]) is a surname borne by Bosniaks, Croats and Serbs. Notable people with the surname include:

- Amar Brkić (born 2007), Indonesian football player
- Ante Brkić (born 1988), Croatian chess player
- Boško Brkić (1968–1993), Romeo of Sarajevo killed by sniper fire during siege of Sarajevo
- Courtney Angela Brkic (born 1972), Croatian-American memoirist, short story writer, and academic
- Goran Brkić (born 1991), Serbian footballer
- Haris Brkić (1974–2000), Yugoslav basketball player
- Hasan Brkić (1913–1965), Yugoslav and Bosnian communist and partisan
- Ivan Brkić (disambiguation), several people
- Jozo Brkić (born 1986), Bosnian-Herzegovinian basketball player
- Marijan Brkić Brk (born 1962), Croatian guitarist
- Marko Brkić (basketball) (born 1982), Serbian basketball player
- Marko Brkić (footballer) (born 2000), Bosnian football player
- Mia Brkić (born 2003), Croatian handball player
- Milija Brkić (born 1954), Serbian football player
- Mladen Brkić (born 1980), Serbian football player
- Nikola Brkić (born 1998), Montenegrin water polo player
- Senad Brkić (born 1969), Bosnian football player
- Tomislav Brkić (born 1990), Bosnian-Herzegovinian tennis player
- Vasilije Jovanović-Brkić (1719–1772), Serbian metropolitan of Dabar and Bosnia
- Željko Brkić (born 1986), Serbian football goalkeeper
- Zvonko Brkić (1912–1977), Croatian politician

== See also ==
- Brkich
