= Vlado Strugar =

Serbian historian (1922–2019)

- Born: 28 December 1922; Donji Ulići, Yugoslavia (now Montenegro)
- Died: 24 August 2019 (aged 96); Belgrade, Serbia
- Occupations: military officer, historian

Vlado Strugar (Serbian Cyrillic: Владо Стругар; 28 December 1922 – 24 August 2019) was a Serbian historian and member of the Serbian Academy of Science and Arts, Montenegrin Academy of Sciences and Arts and Macedonian Academy of Sciences and Arts.

Strugar specialized in the history of the Communist Party of Yugoslavia.
