= Brkich =

Brkich is a surname. Notable people with the surname include:

- Amber Brkich (born 1978), American television personality
- Greg Brkich (born 1958), Canadian provincial politician

== See also ==
- Brkic, surname of the same origin
