= Goran Krivokapić =

Montenegrin classical guitarist (born 1979)

Goran in concert

Goran Krivokapić (Montenegrin: Горан Кривокапић; born 7 May 1979) is a Montenegrin classical guitarist.

== Early years and education ==
Due to the 1979 Montenegro earthquake, Krivokapić was born in Belgrade, SR Serbia, SFR Yugoslavia. He started his music education at the age of eight with Mićo Poznanović at the Music School of Herceg Novi in Montenegro. When he was nine he began to perform publicly, and soon built a reputation which led to the Montenegrin poet and television personality Dragan Radulović to produce a documentary about him in 1993. In 1996 he furthered his studies at the Faculty of Music in Belgrade in the class of Srdjan Tošić, graduating in 2000. From 2000 he continued with Hubert Käppel and Roberto Aussel at the Hochschule für Musik Köln in Germany, where he graduated and received the artistic performance (Künstlerische Ausbildung) and postgraduate ("Konzertexamen") degrees. He then completed a master's degree at the Conservatorium Maastricht in the Netherlands with Carlo Marchione and a Masters after Masters with Raphaella Smits at LUCA School of Arts, Campus Lemmeninstituut, in Leuven, Belgium.

== Awards and prizes ==
Krivokapić won his first international competition, "Petar Konjović" in Belgrade at the age of fourteen. In order to finance his studies and living costs in Germany he continued participating in competitions, winning a total of 19 international first prizes.

- 1994 – Petar Konjović, Belgrade.
- 1995 – Citta di Stresa Music Competition (guitar category)
- 1996 – Petar Konjović, Belgrade
- 1997 – Corfu International Guitar Competition Greece
- 2000 – XVI International Guitar Competition Andrés Segovia La Herradura, Spain
- 2000 – XXXIII Michele Pittaluga International Classical Guitar Competition(member of the World Federation of International Music Competitions in Alessandria, Italy
- 2001 – XXIII International Guitar Competition Rene Bartoli in Aix-en-Provence, France. First prize and audience prize
- 2001 – Wesel Guitar Festival and Competition, Germany
- 2003 – XXXII International Guitar Competition Fernando Sor in Rome, Italy
- 2003 – I Koblenz International Guitar Competition, Koblenz, Germany
- 2003 – Velez-Malaga International Guitar Competition, Spain.n
- 2003 – International Guitar Festival and Competition Arhontiko, Arhanes, Crete
- 2004 – I Iserlohn International Guitar Competition, Iserlohn, Germany.
- 2004 – Ruggero Chiesa Citta di Camogli, Italy.
- 2004 – VII Alhambra International Guitar Competition
- 2004 – XXV International Guitar Competition Mauro Giuliani, Bari, Italy.
- 2004 – XXII Guitar Foundation of America International Solo Competition, Montréal, Canada.
- 2004 – XXXI Dr. Luis Sigall International Competition for Musical Performance (member of WFIMC), Viña del Mar, Chile.
- 2007 – Heinsberg International Guitar Competition, Germany.

Two Chittara D'oro (Golden Guitar) awards at the Alessandria International Guitar Convention which is held each year in Italy: 2005 for Best Young Guitarist Of The Year, and 2006 for his debut CD.

== Artistic life ==
Goran Krivokapić has performed extensively all over Europe, North and South America, Asia, Africa and Russia, in halls such as Concertgebouw in Amsterdam, Tchaikovsky Hall in Moscow, Lubkowitz Palace in Vienna, Auditorio Conde Duque in Madrid and Saint Petersburg Philharmonia.

As a soloist, Goran Krivokapić has performed with the Slovak Chamber Orchestra of Bohdan Warchal, Belgrade Philharmonic Orchestra, Chilean Symphony Orchestra, Moscow Symphony Orchestra, Turin Philharmonic, Folkwang Chamber Orchestra, Istanbul State Symphony Orchestra, New Russian Symphony Orchestra, St. George String Orchestra, Harmonie Universelle, Berliner Camerata, Montenegrin Symphony Orchestra, Romanian National Radio Orchestra, Philharmonic Orchestra Bremerhaven, Johannesburg Symphony Orchestra, Kwazulu-Natal Philharmonic and Shenyang Symphony Orchestra amongst others.

As a performer, teacher and adjudicator Krivokapić attended international festivals such as Festspiele Mecklenburg-Vorpommern, musicAmuseo, Festival Internacional de Música y Danza de Granada, Kotor Art, Koblenz International Guitar Festival, Mittelrhein Musik Festival, Central-European Music Festival, Guitar Virtuosi Festival, Forum Gitarre Wien, Iserlohn International Guitar Festival, GFA International Guitar Convention, International Guitar Festival Aarhus, Aalborg International Guitar Festival, A Tempo Festival, Guitar Art Festival, Guitarras del Mundo, Festival Internacional de Violao Belo Horizonte, Festival Internacional de Guitarra Monterrey, Semanas Musicalas de Frutillar, Shenyang Guitar Festival, Changsha International Guitar Festival, Qinling International Guitar Festival and Daejon Guitar Festival. He has given masterclasses, lectures on Bach and workshops at Grieg Academy (Norway), State University of New York, University of Toronto, Hochschule für Musik Detmold, Indiana University Jacobs School of Music, Gnessin Russian Academy of Music (Moscow), Florida State University, Conservatorium Maastricht, University of Cape Town, University of Texas Dallas, Victoria Conservatory of Music, Chapman University, Royal Conservatory of Music in Montreal, Seoul National University, Arkansas State University, University of Manitoba, University of Texas in Brownsville, State Conservatory M.I. Glinka Nizhny Novgorod, University of Wisconsin, Loyola Marymount in Los Angeles, University of Veracruz and Tianjin Conservatory. He has been active in the "Rhapsody in School" project on a regular basis, an outreach initiative founded by Lars Vogt, which devotes itself to bringing classical music into the classroom.

Regular features, broadcasts for television and radio include WDR, BBC, Hessischer Rundfunk, Bayerischer Rundfunk, SWR2, MDR, Radio Bremen, Fox 7, WGBH Boston, Fine Music Radio, RTP (Antena2) Classic FM, ABC Classic, RTCG, TV Arte, TV Politika and TV Montenegro. His recordings and performances have been highly praised and featured in Gramophone Magazine (UK), Classical Guitar Magazine (UK), Akustik Gitarre (Germany), Gendai Guitar Magazine (Japan), The WholeNote (Canada), Soundboard Magazine (USA) Neue Musikzeitung (Germany), Les Cahiers de la Guitare (France), Musica (Italy), Seicorde (Italy), Il Fronimo (Italy) and MobilArt (Montenegro).

In 2017 Goran Krivokapić was featured giving a masterclass on Joaquin Rodrigo's Concierto de Aranjuez for DakApp and Medici.TV.

In 2005 Krivokapić and classical guitarist Danijel Cerović formed the Montenegrin Guitar Duo. In 2013 their debut CD was published by the Montenegrin Music Centre. The recording features works by Domeniconi, Piazzolla and Bogdanović. Naxos Records released two volumes of J.S.Bach's English Suites, transcribed by the duo for two guitars in 2015 (Suites 1–3) and 2018 (Suites 4–6).

Krivokapić is teaching guitar at LUCA School of Arts, Campus Lemmeninstituut in Leuven, Belgium, the Prince Claus Conservatoire-Hanze University of Applied Sciences in Groningen, The Netherlands, University of Music Detmold, and is professor of guitar at the Cologne University of Music, Germany.

== Premiered and dedicated works ==
Goran Krivokapić's musical focus lies on the development of new works for classical guitar, mainly through making his own transcriptions of baroque and classical works, and collaborating with contemporary composers. Gerard Drozd dedicated his Concierto de Gliwice Opus 175, which Krivokapić premiered with the AUKSO Chamber Orchestra in 2018, conducted by Marek Moś. Drozd's Concierto for two guitars and string quartett Opus 140, dedicated to the Montenegrin Guitar Duo was premiered by Krivokapić and Cerović, together with the Camerata Quartett in 2013, as well as his Suite for two guitars Opus 150, dedicated to the Montenegrin Guitar Duo and premiered by them in 2014. In 2011 Drozd wrote a piece "Favola per Luka" to commemorate the birth of Krivokapic's son. The premiere recording of Hendrik Hofmeyr's Rapsodia Notturna per chitarra e pianoforte, written for Krivokapić and Corneli Smit, and Sonate Printanière by Dušan Bogdanović for guitar and piano was released in 2013 together with other original chamber music works for guitar and piano by KSGEXAUDIO. He premiered Hofmeyr's Lachrymae for guitar, which was written for him, during the Meesters op de Gitaar series at the Concertgebouw in Amsterdam in 2009. Hofmeyr wrote Diablerie for viola and guitar for Krivokapić and Gareth Lubbe, which they premiered in 2019 at Krivokapić's inaugural concert at the Cologne University of Music (Wuppertal). Atanas Ourkouzounov dedicated his Chaconne for solo guitar to him. Other premiered works (performance and recordings) include his transcription of C.P.E. Bach's Sonata for flute Wq. 132 and piano sonata XVI:33 by Joseph Haydn, transcribed by Carlo Marchione.

== Selected recordings ==
• Guitar Recital (Naxos)

Guitar Recital: Goran Krivokapic

Recorded at the St John Chrysostom Church, Newmarket, Ontario, Canada, 28 April – 1 May 2005 NAXOS 8.557809 [61:11]

• Fernando Sor – Guitar Music Opus 6 – 9 (Naxos)

SOR, F.: 12 Studies, Op. 6 / Fantasia No. 2, Op. 7 / 6 Divertimentos, Op. 8 (Krivokapic) – 8.570502

• J.S. Bach – English Suites 1–3 (Naxos)

BACH, J.S.: English Suites Nos. 1–3 (arr. Montenegrin Guitar Duo for 2 guitars) (Montenegrin Guitar Duo) – 8.573473

• J.S. Bach – English Suites 4–6 (Naxos)

BACH, J.S.: English Suites Nos. 4–6 (arr. Montenegrin Guitar Duo for 2 guitars) (Montenegrin Guitar Duo) – 8.573676

• Spanish Guitar Masterpieces (Naxos)

SPANISH GUITAR MASTERPIECES – 8.578343

• Chamber Music for Guitar and Piano (KSGEXAUDIO)

Chamber Music for Guitar and Piano by Corneli Smit & Goran Krivokapic

Krivokapic & Smit: Chamber Music

• Sonate (Montenegrin Music Centre)

"Discography J.S. Bach". Archived from the original on 4 August 2020.

• Montenegrin Guitar Duo (Montenegrin Music Centre)

Montenegrin Guitar Duo
