= Slobodan Backović =

Montenegrin politician and nuclear physicist

Slobodan Backović (Serbian Cyrillic: Слободан Бацковић; born September 3, 1946 in Nikšić, Montenegro) is a Montenegrin politician and nuclear physicist. He is a member of the Doclean Academy of Sciences and Arts and the Montenegrin Academy of Sciences and Arts. A former Minister of Education and Science in the government of Montenegro as a member of the Democratic Party of Socialists of Montenegro, Backović is well known for a controversial decision to rename the elementary and secondary education subject "Serbian Language" to "First Language".

In 2008, Backović was appointed to as Ambassador Extraordinary and Plenipotentiary of Montenegro to the Russian Federation, and he presented his credentials to Vladimir Titov, the Deputy Minister of Foreign Affairs of the Russian Federation on 5 June 2008. and to President Dmitry Medvedev on September 18, 2008.

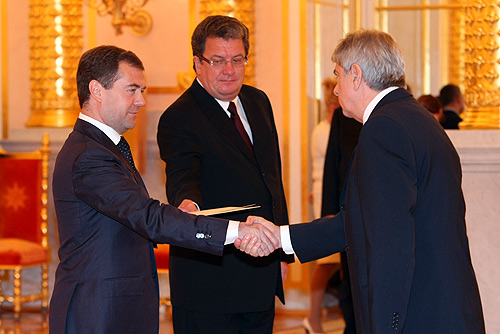
Slobodan Backovic presenting his credentials to Dmitry Medvedev, President of Russia, in 2008.
