= Šerbo Rastoder =

Montenegrin historian (born 1956)

- Шербо Растодер
- Born: August 13, 1956 (age 70); Radmanci, SFR Yugoslavia
- Education: University of Belgrade
- Occupation: Historian
- Employer: University of Montenegro
- Awards: Thirteenth of July Award

Šerbo Rastoder (Montenegrin Cyrillic: Шербо Растодер; born 13 August 1956) is a Montenegrin historian of Bosniak ethnicity. He is also an author, writing about the history of Montenegro and about a few specific parts of Montenegro's history. He is a member of the Doclean Academy of Sciences and Arts, Bosniak Academy of Sciences and Arts and Montenegrin Academy of Sciences and Arts. In 2017, he signed the Declaration on the Common Language of the Croats, Serbs, Bosniaks and Montenegrins.

Šerbo Rastoder is the long-term President of the National Council of Montenegro.

== Biography ==
Šerbo Rastoder was born in Radmance, a region in northern Montenegro encompassing parts of the municipalities of Berane and Bijelo Polje to a Bosniak family. He completed elementary and high school in Bar. He graduated at the University of Belgrade Faculty of Philosophy in 1981. He competed master (1987) and doctoral (1993) studies at the same institution. He currently works as a professor, teaching in the University of Montenegro, Faculty of Philosophy in Nikšić. He is also a Director and Editor-in-Chief of the Podgorica-based Almanah association. His cousin Rifat Rastoder is a former Deputy Speaker of the Parliament of Montenegro and vice-President of the Social Democratic Party of Montenegro (SDP).

== Works ==
- Dr. Nikola Dobrečić, arcibiskup barski i primas srpski (1872–1955), Život i djelo, Released: 1991 in Budva
- Životna Pitanja Crne Gore 1918–1929, Released: 1996 in Bar
- Političke Borbe u Crnoj Gori 1918–1929, Released: 1996 in Belgrade
- Skrivana Strana Istorije, Crnogorska Buna i Odmetnički Pokret 1918–1929, Parts I - IV, Released: 1997 in Bar
- Političke Stranke u Crnoj Gori 1918–1929, Released: 2000 in Bar
- Janušovo Lice Istorije, Released: 2000 in Podgorica
- Uloga Francuske u Nasilnoj Aneksiji Crne Gore – Edited by Šerbo Rastoder, Released: 2000 in Bar
- Crna Gora u Egzilu, Parts I and II, Released: 2004
- History of Montenegro, from Ancient Times to 2003 – co-author (wrote Part II of book), Released: 2006 in Podgorica
- Istorijski Leksikon Crne Gore – co-author, Released: 2006
