= Doclean Academy of Sciences and Arts =

Academic institution in Montenegro

- Abbreviation: DANU
- Formation: 1998
- Type: National academy
- Purpose: Science, arts, academics
- Headquarters: Podgorica, Montenegro
- Chairman: Sreten Perović

The Doclean Academy of Sciences and Arts (Montenegrin and Serbian: Dukljanska akademija nauka i umjetnosti, DANU / Дукљанска академија наука и уметности, ДАНУ; Latin Academia Dioclitiana Scientiarum et Artium) is a parallel scholars' academy in Montenegro. It is named after the medieval state of Duklja, a historical predecessor to modern Montenegrin state. DANU is one of two established academies in the country, other being the Montenegrin Academy of Sciences and Arts (CANU).

The academy was created in 1998 by scholars who considered CANU to be dominantly influenced by Serbian nationalism and essentially a branch of SANU, and wanted to establish an independent Montenegrin academy instead.

DANU grants the following awards:

- Saint Vladimir of Duklja Award – awarded biannually for lifetime achievement
- Sclavorum Regnum Award – awarded for achievement in the sciences
- Lesendro Award – awarded for achievement in Montenegrin literature
- Njegoš Award – awarded for achievement within the academy and in the promotion of Montenegrin sciences and arts

In 2015 DANU reportedly merged into the Montenegrin Academy of Sciences and Arts.

== Prominent members ==
- Božo Nikolić, engineer
- Zuvdija Hodžić, writer
- Radmila Vojvodić, playwright, director
- Dimitrije Popović, painter
- Radovan Radonjić, political scientist
- Šerbo Rastoder, historian
- Boško Odalović, painter
- Rajko Todorović Todor, painter
- Mladen Lompar, writer
- Sreten Asanović, writer
- Blagota Mitrić, jurist
- Nebojša Vučinić, attorney
- Miodrag Perović, sculptor
- Sreten Perović, writer
- Vukić Pulević, biologist
- Danilo Radojević, historian of literature
- Branko Radojičić, geographer
- Božidar Šekularac, historian
- Vojislav Vulanović, writer
- Slobodan Backović, physicist

== Honorary members ==
- (Romania) Ion Diaconescu, political activist
- (Italy) Giuseppe Parodi Domenichi di Parodi, archaeologist
- (Ukraine) Stanislav Dovgiy, physicist and mathematician
- (Spain) Justo Jorge Padrón, poet and essayist
- (North Macedonia) Mateja Matevski, poet, critic and essayist
- (Slovakia) František Lipka, diplomat, poet and translator

== Former and deceased members ==
- Vojislav Nikčević
- Mirko Kovač, writer
- Obren Blagojević, (also member of CANU and SANU, Honorary President)
- Mihajlo Kuliš, MD
- Radoje Pajović, historian
- Veselin Aga Simović, engineer
- Jevrem Brković, writer

== See also ==
- Duklja
- Montenegrin Academy of Sciences and Arts
