= Montenegrin Academy of Sciences and Arts =

Scientific institution in Montenegro

- Abbreviation: CANU
- Formation: 1971
- Type: National academy
- Purpose: Science, arts, academics
- Headquarters: Podgorica, Montenegro
- Location: 42°26′36″N 19°16′15″E
- Members: 31 full members (as of May 2011)
- President: Dragan Vukčević
- Affiliations: ICSU
- Website: www.canu.me

Montenegrin Academy of Sciences and Arts (Serbo-Croatian Cyrillic: Црногорска академија наука и умјетности, ЦАНУ; Crnogorska akademija nauka i umjetnosti, CANU) is the most important scientific institution of Montenegro.

== History ==
It was founded in 1971 as the Montenegrin Society for Science and Arts (Црногорско друштво за науку и умјетност, Crnogorsko društvo za nauku i umjetnost) and adopted its current name in 1976. It currently has 40 members (academicians) in three departments: natural sciences, humanities and arts.

The CANU has often been considered and described as a pro-Serbian institution in Montenegro, as the academy' posits the Serb ethnic origin of the Montenegrins. In opposition to this, a splinter group of intellectuals had formed the Doclean Academy of Sciences and Arts (DANU) in 1997, registered as a non-governmental organization, in an attempt to counter the official pro-Serbian academy.

Amid the constitutional reforms of 2007 CANU had resisted the standardization of the Montenegrin literary standard supporting the interpretation according to which Montenegrin is a "dialect" of the Serbian language. Some of CANU's prominent members have actively participated in the campaign against Montenegro's independence in the 2006 independence referendum. CANU president Momir Đurović had in 2007 maintained contacts with members of the pro-Serbian political opposition, and had visited the headquarters of the Serb People's Party and its leader Andrija Mandić during the negotiations on language-naming in the new constitution. The Academy has also criticized Montenegrin government's decision to recognize Kosovo's unilateral declaration of independence.

However, in 2015 DANU was merged into CANU, as all of its active members were accepted into membership and DANU was consequently disbanded, with CANU remaining the sole official scientific institution in Montenegro.

== Presidents ==
List of presidents of the Montenegrin Academy of Arts and Sciences:

- Historian Branko Pavićević (born 1922) (1973–1981),
- Economist Branislav Šoškić (born 1922) (1981–1985),
- Economist Mirčeta Ðurović (born 1924) (1985–1989),
- Surgeon Dragutin Vukotić (born 1924) (1989–2001),
- Engineer Momir Ðurović (born 1941) (2002-2016)
- Jurist Dragan Vukčević (born 1958) (2016–present)

== Notable members ==
Notable historical, former and currently active members of the Montenegrin Academy of Sciences and Arts (CANU):

- Social Sciences; Miomir Dašić, Zoran Lakić, Vlado Strugar, Branko Pavićević, Branislav Šoškić, Božina Ivanović, Mirčeta Đurović, Sima Ćirković, Nebojša Vučinić, Slobodan Perović, Šerbo Rastoder, Milorad Ekmečić and Branislav Đurđev
- Natural Sciences: Ljubiša Stanković, Slobodan Backović, Vojin Dajović, Momir Đurović, Dragiša Ivanović and Ivo Šlaus
- Arts: Vojo Stanić, Milos Vusković, Aleksandar Prijić, Dušan Vukotić, Mihailo Lalić, Radovan Zogović, Ćamil Sijarić, Žarko Đurović, Čedo Vuković, Dimitrije Popović, Sreten Asanović, Cvetan Grozdanov, Petar Omčikus, Asim Peco, Milivoj Solar, Zdravko Velimirović, Branko Popović, Jevrem Brković and Nikola Vukčević

== See also ==
- Doclean Academy of Sciences and Arts (DANU), a parallel scholars' academy in Montenegro, formed in 1998 by part of the Montenegrin Academy of Sciences and Arts members, dissolved in 2015 with its membership rejoined CANU.
