= Marinko Pavićević =

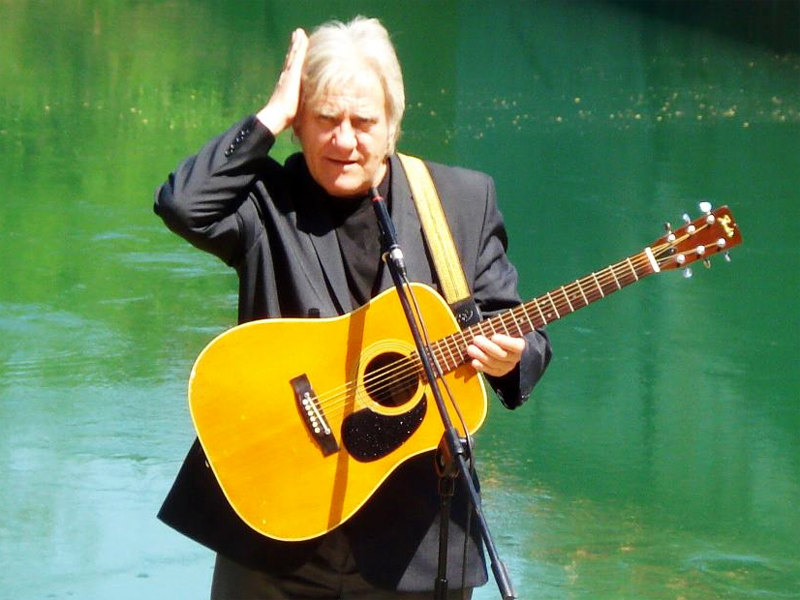
- Marinko Pavićević at Danilovgrad festival 2013

Background information
- Born: February 25, 1957 (age 69); Nikšić, SFR Yugoslavia
- Origin: Nikšić, Montenegro
- Genres: chanson, pop rock, pop, New wave, experimental
- Occupations: Singer, songwriter
- Instruments: vocals guitar piano
- Years active: 1974–present
- Label: RTCG
- Formerly of: Ponoćni ekspres

Marinko Pavićević (Cyrillic: Маринко Павићевић), is a Montenegrin singer, songwriter, guitarist and poet, whose musical style incorporates elements of chanson, pop rock, psychedelic and recital. During his career, Pavićević worked as an editor in Montenegrin RTV and during the decades, he was one of the most influential music producers in Montenegro.

== Early life ==
Pavićević was born in Nikšić on February 25, 1957. He was schooled at the same city. Pavićević studied painting at Pedagogical academy.

During his childhood, Pavićević started playing the guitar, with his first ever gig at 17 years. At the same time, he wrote his first poems. During the eighties, Pavićević moved to Podgorica, where he became the host of Radio Montenegro Night show and, after that, an editor at Montenegrin Radio Television.

Pavićević participated on many prominent festivals like Opatija, MESAM, Pjesma Mediterana etc. He was a participant in few Yugoslav contests for Eurosong. Marinko Pavićević made successful career as a poet, too, with five books. At October 11, 2014, Marinko Pavićević marked jubilee of 40 years in music and poetry, with concert "40 years with guitar and poems" in Nikšić.

== Musical career ==
After seven years in solo music, Marinko Pavićević became the vocalist in band 'Ponoćni ekspres' (Midnight Express), based in Nikšić. Group formed in 1981, existed two years. After that period, Pavićević made come-back to solo work with many successful singles during the mid-eighties. At that era, he made some of the most popular songs on Montenegrin radio stations at that time, like Suza pjesnika, Čarobnica, Ivana, Jesen u ogledalu etc. With that success, Pavićević made his first gigs in the neighbouring Yugoslav republics' cities like Sarajevo, Belgrade, Trebinje and others. Greatest success in that era, Pavićević made with his performance at the prestigious Opatija festival 1986.

In 1988, Pavićević was a Montenegrin representative at Yugoslav Eurosong contest in Ljubljana. Although failed to win first place, Pavićević became popular throughout Yugoslavia.

During the nineties, Pavićević created new significant hits like Svatovi bez pjesme, Rekvijem za Vita Nikolića, Žuto kuče, Da li si ikog voljela and many others. At 1992, he made remarkable gig at 'Podgorica guitar fest' in front of 5,000 visitors in Morača Sports Center. During the same year, Pavićević represented Montenegro at the Yugoslav MESAM festival in Belgrade. He participated twice at the Pjesma Mediterana festival in Budva (1994, 1996).

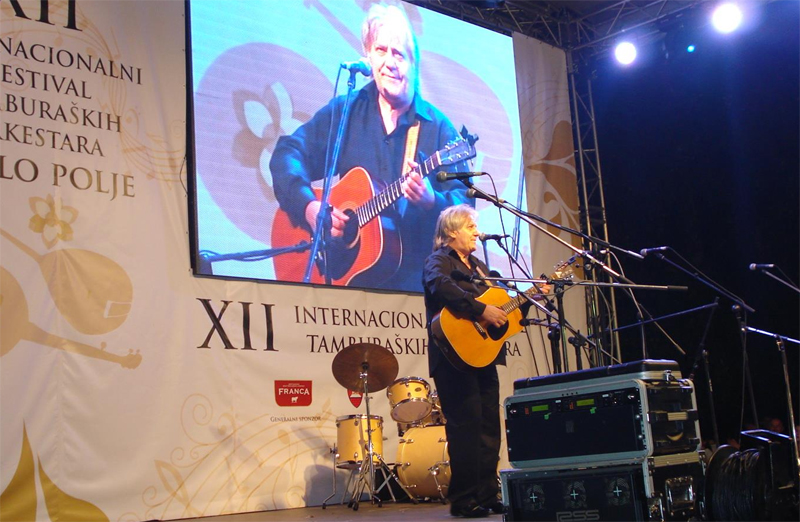
Marinko Pavićević at Bijelo Polje festival, 2014

Pavićević created his greatest hit – patriotic song Crnoj Gori at the start of the new century. With that single, Pavićević gained big popularity in Montenegro and among Montenegrin diaspora. On his shows in Montenegrin cities gathered a thousands of fans. During the period after 2010, Pavićević made his coming back in former Yugoslavia region, with gigs in Belgrade, Novi Sad, Zagreb, Sarajevo, Trebinje and other cities.

Four decades of his musical and poetry work, Marinko Pavićević marked at October 2014, with concert "40 years with guitar and poems" in Nikšić. Gig in 'Scena 213' hall visited a hundred of spectators and among them many of prominent Montenegrin singers and artists like Milisav Moto Laketić and others.

=== Marinko Pavićević Fanclub ===
Marinko Pavićević is known as one of rare Montenegrin musicians with fanclub. On 2010, group of Facebook users made a fanclub page. Page had news about Pavićević, but the fans' drawings and comics of musician, too.

=== Jubilee compilation ===
The most popular songs from his career, Pavićević published on greatest hits album Ognjište ('Hearthstone'). Compilation album is published in contest of jubilee of four-decades career of Marinko Pavićević.

All tracks are written by Marinko Pavićević.

No.	Title	Length
1.	"Crnoj Gori"	4:18
2.	"Da li si ikog voljela"	4:24
3.	"Ljubav ispod kaputa"	3:33
4.	"Ivana"	4:28
5.	"Sivi soko"	2:52
6.	"Stara varoš lijepa si"	3:06
7.	"Himna vatrogasaca"	3:11
8.	"Poželi mi mirno more"	3:32
9.	"Rekvijem za Vita Nikolića"	4:06
10.	"Noć punog mjeseca"	4:09
11.	"Breza"	4:17
12.	"Svatovi bez pjesme"	3:28
13.	"Suza pjesnika"	2:32
14.	"Čarobnica"	4:06
15.	"Jedina moja"	4:02
16.	"Hej druže stari"	2:30
17.	"Moji drugari"	2:51
18.	"Javi se"	4:42
19.	"Jesen u ogledalu"	4:48
20.	"Suza"	4:00

== Poetry ==
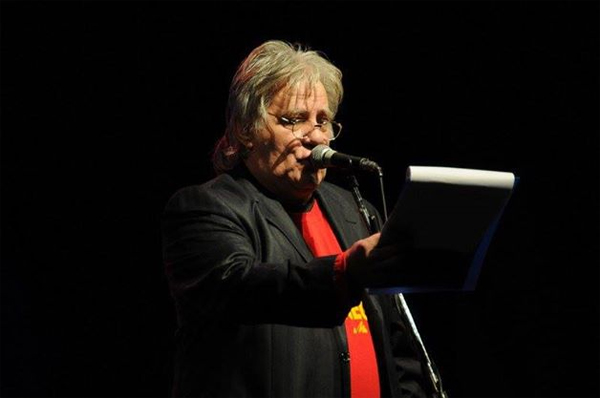
Pavićević, recital at theatre

Pavićević wrote his first poem at the high school, and until today he published five books. His first book is printed at 1989. His works are published in Podgorica, Cetinje and Tivat.

Main messages of Pavićević's work are love, friendship and understanding. On 2012, Pavićević told that it's hard to be a poet because "there is always someone who blames poets". Pavićević participated on numerous poetry nights in Montenegro and Bosnia and Herzegovina. One of his most known songs is a Ballad to Mostar.

=== Bibliography ===
During his four-decade career, Pavićević published five collection-books of poetry, with hundreds of poems.

- Nebesko dno [Небеско дно, "The Bottom of the Sky"], Titograd, 1989.
- Monahov talisman [Монахов талисман, "Monks Talisman"], Podgorica, 1995.
- Svetac bez oreola [Светац без ореола, "A Saint without aureole"], Podgorica, 2005.
- Trilogija: Pečat pravednika [Трилогија: Печат праведника, "Trilogy: Sign of the Righteous"], Cetinje, 2009.
- Kruna od kamena [Круна од камена, "Stone Crown"], Tivat, 2014.

== Other work ==
As an artist with a long-time career, but as a journalist and radio host, too, Marinko Pavićević is working in cultural, civic and media organisations. He is a member of Association of Montenegrin musicians, Union of Montenegrin writers, Writers' Federation Nikšić and Montenegrin Journalists' Society.

He is an awarded composer and songwriter on many youth and kids festivals in Montenegro, Bosnia and Herzegovina, Serbia and Macedonia.

During 2014, Marinko Pavićević was a fine art professor at "Milorad Musa Burzan" elementary school in Podgorica.

He is member of the Political Council of the Liberal Party of Montenegro for cultural issues.
