= Balša Brković =

Montenegrin writer, literary critic and journalist

Balša Brković Балша Брковић
- Born: 25 April 1966 (age 60); Titograd, Socialist Federal Republic of Yugoslavia
- Education: University of Belgrade Faculty of Philosophy

Balša Brković (Serbo-Croatian Cyrillic: Балша Брковић; born 25 April 1966) is a Montenegrin writer, essayist and theatre critic. He is also editor of cultural section of daily newspaper Vijesti, and one of the prominent members of the political party United Reform Action (URA).

== Biography ==
Balša Brković was born on 25 April 1966 in Titograd. His father Jevrem Brković was a well-known Montenegrin writer. Balša's mother Ljeposava "Kaća" Brković (née Škuletić) was an elementary school teacher.

He graduated from the University of Belgrade Faculty of Philosophy. He is an editor for the Vijesti newspaper for its culture section and is deeply involved with preservation of the original Montenegrin language. He is a member of the Montenegrin PEN Center. He was also a speaker at the International Festival for short stories in 2009. In 2017, he has signed the Declaration on the Common Language of the Croats, Serbs, Bosniaks and Montenegrins.

Brković published collections of poetry: Konji jedu breskve (1985), Filip boje srebra (1991), Rt Svete Marije (1993), Contrapposto (1998) and Dvojenje (2001) and novels Privatna galerija (2002) and Paranoja u Podgorici (2010).
