= Ivan Brkić =

Ivan Brkić may refer to:

- Ivan Brkić (actor) (1960–2015), Croatian actor
- Ivan Brkić (footballer) (born 1995), Croatian footballer
