= Jevrem Brković =

Montenegrin poet and writer (1933–2021)

Jevrem Brković

Jevrem Brković (Serbian Cyrillic: Јеврем Брковић; 29 December 1933 – 24 January 2021) was a Montenegrin poet, writer, journalist, dissident and historian. Brković was one of the founders and members of Doclean Academy of Sciences and Arts (DANU), a parallel scholars' academy in Montenegro, disputed by the national Montenegrin Academy of Sciences and Arts (CANU), parallel academy dissolved in 2015 with its membership, including Brković rejoined CANU.

== Biography ==
He was born in the Seoca village near Podgorica, Zeta Banate, Kingdom of Yugoslavia. Brković worked as a journalist at the Radio Titograd and was a deputy editor of the magazine "Ovdje". Brković spent his early life in Belgrade, Serbia, then capital city of Socialist Yugoslavia. In 1975 he was the recipient of the "13 July prize", the most prestigious Montenegrin national annual award. While in Belgrade, Brković promoted civil disobedience and supported free society. A romantic poet of the same league, he intimately befriended Matija Bećković and Radovan Karadžić, though he would later become their most harsh critic. During the Yugoslav wars in the 1990s he affected a pro-Montenegrin attitude and his views were described as being anti-establishment. He was also a critic of the government led by Milo Đukanović. In 1994, due to Đukanovic's pressure and political persecutions, Brković left Montenegro for Croatia where he stayed for some time. While in Croatia he studied the research of the historian Savić Marković Štedimlija and Croatian historian Ivo Pilar.

In 1999 he returned to Montenegro, when, in his words, "Montenegro once again became Montenegrin". He was since a strong supporter of Montenegrin independence from the state union of Serbia and Montenegro.

The same year Brković became the founder and first president of the Doclean Academy of Sciences and Arts, a non-governmental cultural organization in Montenegro, dedicated to Štedimlija's research of Montenegrins' true original Red Croat identity and to proving that Montenegrins are not related to the Serbs. Seen as an organization paired to the official Montenegrin Academy of Sciences and Arts which it reckons is pro-Serb and pro-establishment, among others, at around the same time, he became the editor of Crnogorski književni list (Montenegrin Literary Paper) also known as CKL that is published in Montenegrin, Serbian, Bosnian and Croatian language.

He was praised and criticized for his frequent activism and role as Montenegrin independentist and liberty sympathizer and honest patriot and cosmopolitan, his enemies mostly calling him an "Ustaša" because of his opposition to Serbian nationalism. His works were also praised and criticized for his satirical humour and due to frequent use of obscene and vulgar language. In 2001, his organization, the Doclean Academy of Sciences and Arts, actively campaigned for the election of "Coalition for an Independent Montenegro".

On October 24, 2006 Brković and his driver and bodyguard Srđan Vojičić were attacked by three armed men. Vojičić was shot dead, while Brković escaped with mild injuries, The reason for the attack was his latest book, Ljubavnik Duklje (The Doclean Lover), in which he ridiculed people from contemporary Montenegrin public life such as close friends of Milo Đukanović.

Brković died on 24 January 2021 at the age of 87.

== Personal life ==
His son, Balša Brković is also a notable Montenegrin writer, while his grandson Brajan Brković lives in Serbia and is the vice president of the Novi Sad branch of the Party of Freedom and Justice.

== Works ==
=== Poetry ===
- Testaments
- Highlands Country
- Highlands Homer is dead
- Sons of Bitches
- Ancient fog around the home
- Komite ballads

=== Novels ===
- Pantelej on a cornel
- Duke's men
- Black spots
- Monigrens
- Stone-cutters
- The Lover of Doclea

=== Philosophical works ===
- The anatomy of a Stalinist's moral
- Mine fields of the esthetics
- The destroyed face of democracy
- Glossary
- Foundation and destroying of the Ozrović house
