= University of Montenegro Music Academy =

- Muzička akademija Univerziteta Crne Gore
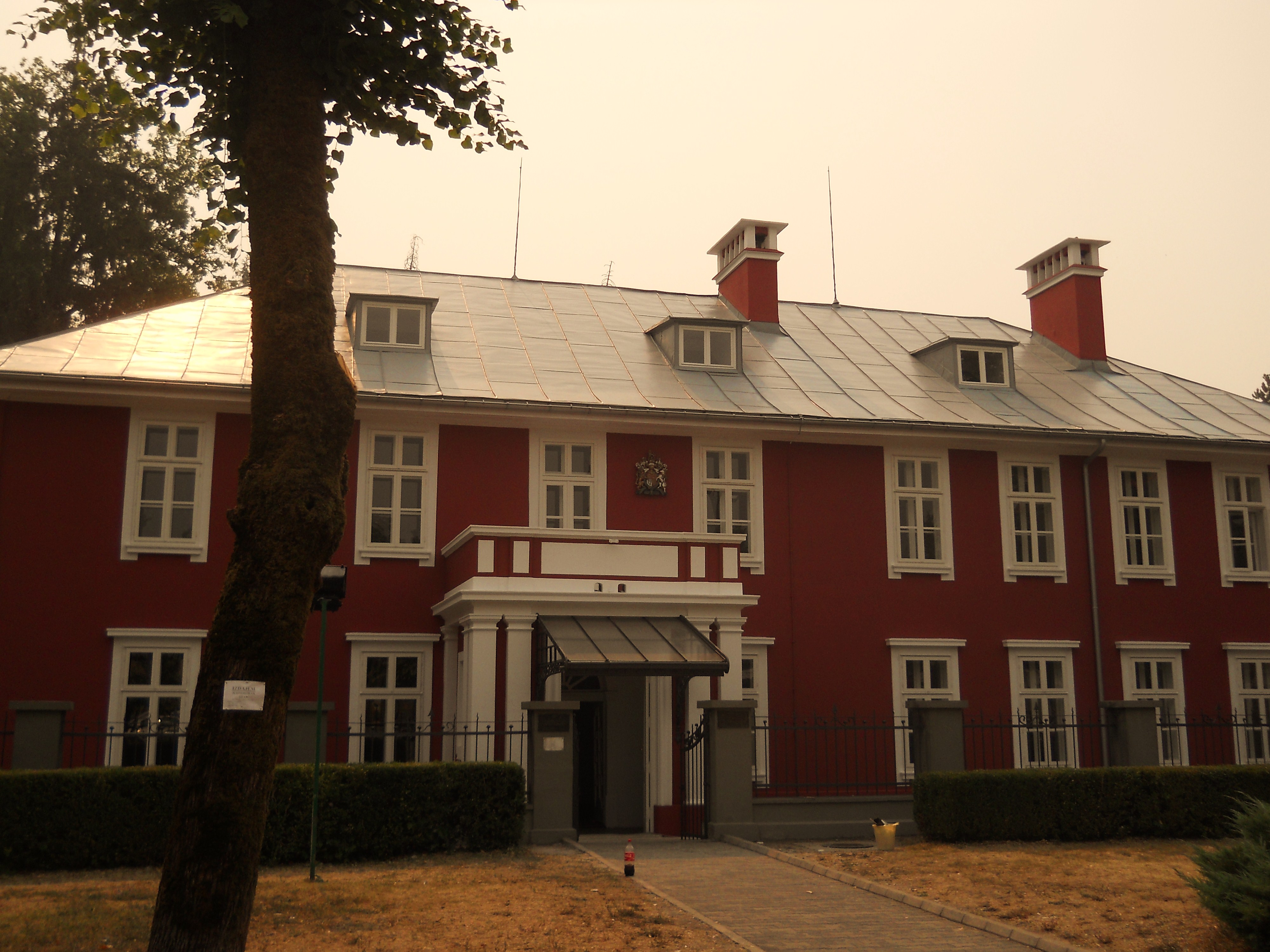
- Type: Public
- Established: 1980
- Affiliations: University of Montenegro
- Dean: Bojan Martinović
- Location: Cetinje, Montenegro; 42.386943°N 18.926154°E
- Campus: Urban

The University of Montenegro Music Academy (Montenegrin: Muzička Akademija Univerziteta Crne Gore Музичка Академија Универзитета Црне Горе) is one of the educational institutions of the University of Montenegro. The Academy is located in Cetinje, in the building of the former British embassy to Montenegro.

== History ==
The Music Academy was founded in 1980, as part of the "Veljko Vlahović" University (today's University of Montenegro). The Academy was located in Podgorica until 1996, when it was moved to the building of the former Embassy of the United Kingdom in Cetinje.

In November 2006, the Academy became a full member of the European Association of Conservatoires (AEC).

== Organization ==
Undergraduate studies, as well as postgraduate specialist and master studies are offered on the following eight study groups:

- Composing
- Conducting
- General Music Pedagogy
- Piano
- String Instruments
  - Violin
  - Viola
  - Violoncello
  - Contrabass
- Wind Instruments
  - Flute
  - Clarinet
  - Trumpet
  - Horn
  - Trombone
  - Oboe
- Guitar
- Accordion

== Notable faculty ==
- Jelena Manja Radulović-Vulić (1936-2007), dean and full professor
