= Carlo Marchione =

Italian guitarist

- Born: 02.10.1964; Rome, Italy

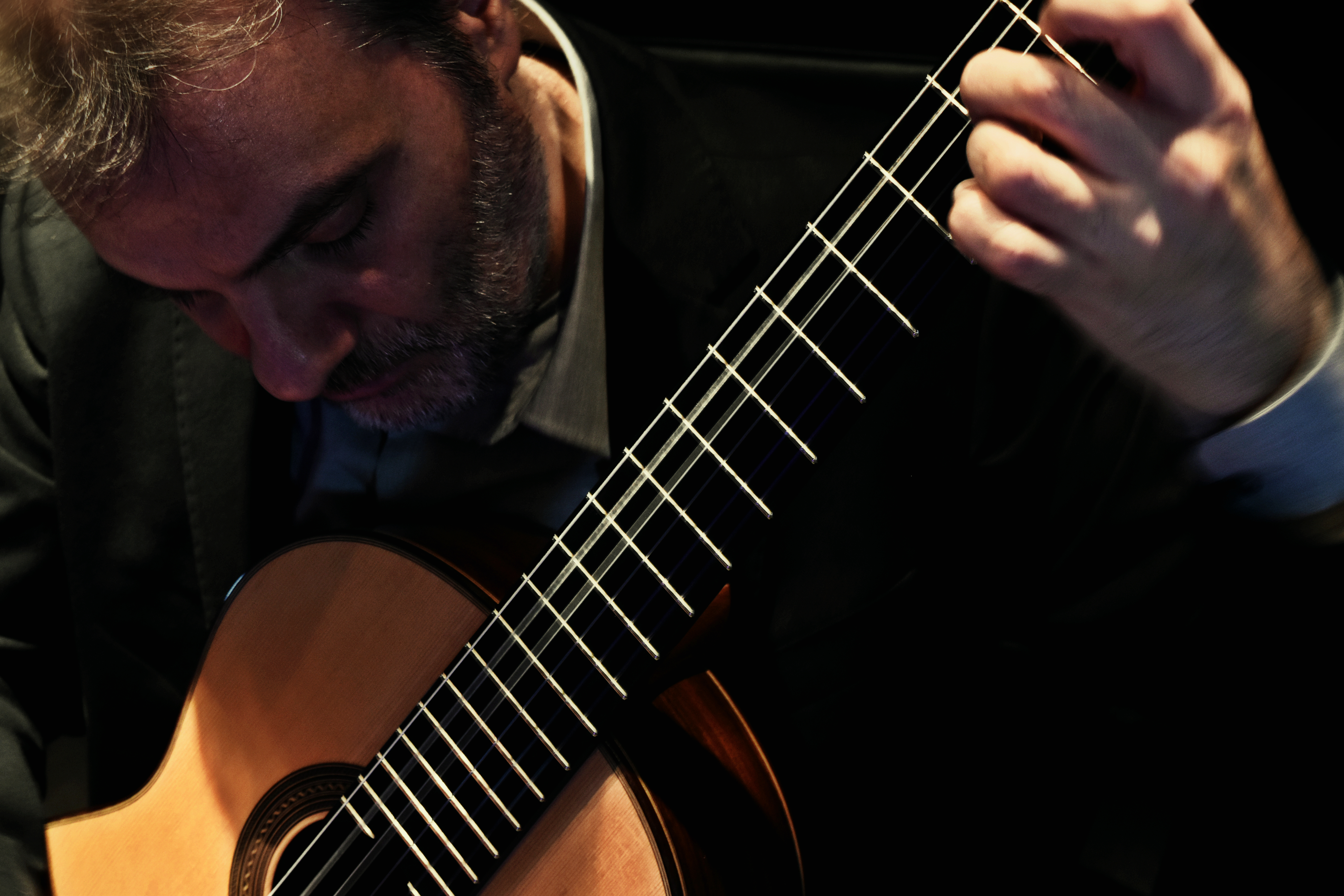
www.carlo-marchione.com

Carlo Marchione is a classical guitarist from Italy and was born in Rome, Italy in 1964. He teaches at the Maastricht Academy of Music (Netherland), leading one of the most appreciated guitar classes of Europe.

== Biography ==
In the course of his career he has been awarded many top prizes in International competitions (Ancona 1979/80, "L. Legnani" Parma 1981, "M. Giuliani" 1982, "Ville de Sablé" 1985, Gargnano 1989, "N. Paganini" 1991, "Città di Latina" 1992).

He is a regular guest at Festivals throughout Europe (Italy, Spain, France, Holland, England, Czech Republic, Germany, Austria, Rumania, Ukraine, Poland, Russia, Sweden, Croatia) appearing both as soloist and with orchestra and various chamber music ensembles.

While touring Russia in 1997 he was invited to perform in the prestigious Main Auditorium of "Tchaikowsky Conservatory in Moscow" as well as in the Philharmonia of St. Petersburg, an honour very rarely bestowed upon a guitarist. Both concerts were sell-outs and received standing ovations. In October 1998 he gave his debut in the "Berliner Philharmonie".

He started taking guitar lessons from the age of 10 with by Master L. Cauzzo, and later on with L. Gallucci. In 1976 he entered the local Conservatorio Santa Cecilia in his native town, passing the entrance exam in 1st place out of 100 applicants. There he studied with Master Mario Gangi, graduating with honours in 1983.

He is a lecturer in the area of guitar music analysis. After having been teaching at the Music Academy "Ino Mirkovic" in Lovran, (Croatia) and being Honorarprofessor at the Hochschule für Musik und Theater "Felix Mendelssohn Bartholdy", Leipzig, (Germany) he currently leads at the Conservatorium Maastricht, (Netherlands) one of the most successful classes in Europe. Nowadays he is also guest professor at the Pôle Superiour d'enseignements artistiques ( apPSEA) at Lille (Nord-Pas-de-Calais, France) and at the Musical Academy "Civica Scuola delle Arti" in Rome (Italy).

Marchione resides in Maastricht, Netherlands and has two daughters.

== Publications ==
- Georg Philipp Telemann: "Twelve Fantasias for Violin without Bass"] (ESZ.11370, Edizioni Suvini Zerboni)
- Domenico Scarlatti - 2 Sonatas: K208 & K380] (arranged by Carlo Marchione) (ECH113, Chanterelle Verlag)

== Recordings ==
Carlo Marchione plays Aguado and De Fossa

Recording: 1999

Carlo Marchione plays Georg Philipp Telemann (1681-1767)
"Twelve Fantasias for Violin without Bass"
- transcription for guitar by Carlo Marchione

Instrument: Eberhard Kreul (1995)
Recording: February 1998, Anguillara Sabazia (Italy)
Engineer, Editing, Mastering: Leonardo Gallucci
Design: Bogomil J. Helm
Fantasia II in G Major]

kr 10029, Kreuzberg Records (Berlin)

DEWA
Stefan Soewandi - Guitarworks II (double CD) with
CD 1: Zoran Dukic: Träumerei über ein javanisches Volkslied (Reverie on a Javanese Folk-Songs)
CD 1: Siegbert Remberger: Fantasia on a Theme by Tárrega
CD 1: Carlo Marchione: Kamajaya
CD 2: Laura Young: Dewa - Seven Short Etudes
CD 2: Enno Voorhorst: Irrlicht - Sonate
CD 2: The Guitar4mation: Ismaya - Sonatina II for Guitar Quartet
CD 2: Martin Schwarz: Six Studies of a Dream

Recording: Mai 1999 - October 1999, different locations

kr 10043, Kreuzberg Records (Berlin)

Franz Schubert (1797-1828)
Die Schöne Müllerin D. 795
Ein Zyklus von Liedern von Wilhelm Müller (1794-1827)
Christoph Rösel, Tenor - Carlo Marchione, Gitarre

- Arranged for guitar from the original Clavier-score
by Carlo Marchione

Instrument: Eberhard Kreul (1995)

Recorded by Ulrich Rothe at O-Ton-studio Berlin
Mixed by Ulrich Rothe & Rainer Rohloff
Cover Design by Bogomil J. Helm
Produced by Ulrich Rothe (P) & (C) 1997
Am Feierabend
Thränenregen

OmU music

Carlo Marchione plays Stefano Casarini - 6 Studi da Concerto

Studio n° 1 Giga

Edizioni musicali Sinfonica

Darmstädter Gitarrentage 1998–2004

by Carlo Marchione:
G. Ph. Telemann: Fantasie Nr. 1 B-Dur.
C. Domeniconi: Toccata in blue

Chanterelle Verlag

== Interviews ==
- Cithara: Interview mit Carlo Marchione (in German)
