= The WholeNote =

Canadian music magazine, founded 1994

- Categories: Music
- Frequency: 10 issues a year
- Publisher: WholeNote Media Inc.
- Total circulation: 30,000
- Founder: Allan Pulker; David Perlman
- Founded: 1994; 32 years ago
- Country: Canada
- Based in: Toronto
- Language: English
- Website: thewholenote.com
- ISSN: 1488-8777

The WholeNote is a free monthly Canadian music magazine. It uses a controlled circulation model, in which local businesses procure copies and provide them freely to their customers. It gets its revenue from advertising and a grant from the Ontario Arts Council. The publication is known for its concert listings, reviews, and coverage of the Canadian music scene.

It spawned from flutist Allan Pulker's music column in The Kensington Market Drum, a local newspaper run by David Perlman. In November 1994, Pulker contacted Perlman with a proposal to create a spinoff publication dedicated exclusively to music. By June the next year, a four-page prototype issue was created, and in either August or September of 1995, the debut issue of Pulse was released. However, the magazine got into a trademark dispute with an American publication of the same name, so its title was changed temporarily to TMFKAP (The Magazine Formerly Known as Pulse) and, after a reader contest for a new name was held, debuted as The WholeNote in May 1996. During the COVID-19 pandemic, when live music was not played and many businesses were closed, the magazine replaced its concert listings with more original writing.
