= Montenegrin Oro =

Montenegrin folk dance

Crnogorsko oro (Montenegrin and Serbian: crnogorsko oro / црногорско оро, English: Montenegrin oro), or simply oro is a Montenegrin national folk dance originating in the Dinaric region of the Western Balkans. The name 'oro' derives from the dialectal form of the word 'orao', meaning 'eagle', referring to how the dance is performed to resemble the movements of an eagle.

== Etymology ==
Oro being performed in the Morača region, 1965

The Montenegrin national folk dance oro originated in the Dinaric region of the Western Balkans. The name 'oro' derives from the dialectal form of the word 'orao', meaning 'eagle', referring to how the dance is performed to resemble the movements of an eagle.

== Popularity ==
Oro is typically performed at Montenegrin and Herzegovinian weddings and other celebrations. Traditionally many celebrations would have featured oro, but in modern times the dance is mostly found at national festivals. In the Zeta River area, there was a local custom to dance the oro at the celebration of a new house building, in order to properly flatten the dirt floor. It may be included in stylized folklore choreography, and is performed by folk dance groups from Montenegro and Serbia at competitions worldwide.

In oro, men and women dance together, and it is not necessary to be married to participate. There were some moves used in oro in country areas that were not considered appropriate by dancers in towns.

At the Montenegrin pavilion at the Expo 2020 Dubai, on Montenegro's national day, visitors were able to watch folksinging and an oro that finished with the dancers creating a human pyramid.

== Video ==
- Oro sample — folk dance Oro by ensemble “Budo Tomovic” (Montenegro).
- Oro dance from Montenegro pavilion at Dubai, 2020
