= Dragana Kršenković Brković =

Montenegrin writer

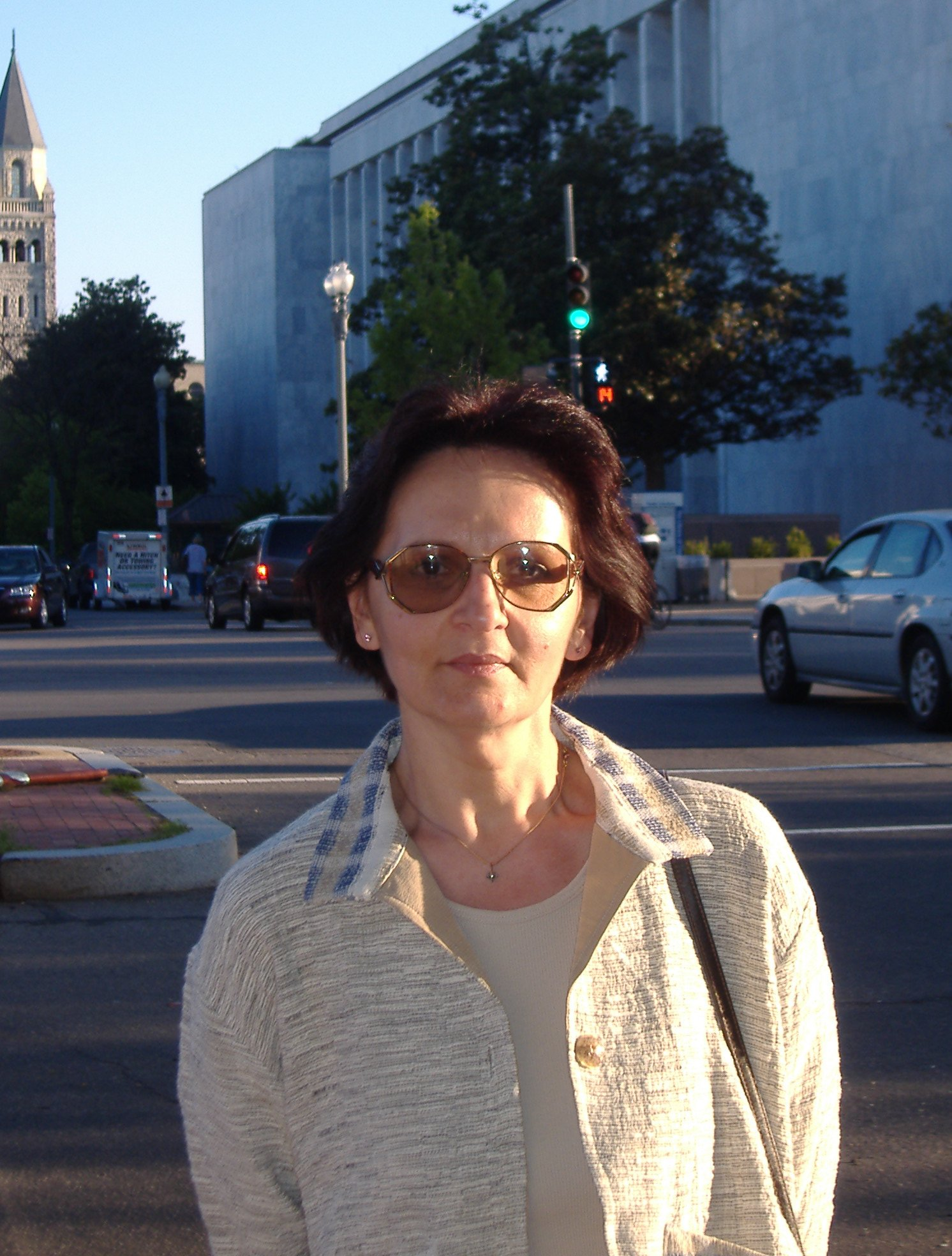
Dragana Kršenković Brković

Dragana Kršenković Brković is a Montenegrin writer.

== Biography ==
Kršenkovic Brković graduated from the Faculty of Political Sciences and from the Faculty of Drama Arts (FDU). TV Belgrade screened her play - Vrele kapi in 1981. She wrote this play for the entrance examination at FDU.

As the Wars in the Balkans erupted, she moved from Belgrade, Serbia, to Podgorica, Montenegro. There, Kršenković Brković with her husband Tomislav Brković established a puppet theater The Blue Lagoon. Details of this theater can be found in the bilingual monograph Puppet Theatre Blue Lagoon (Podgorica, 2019)

The list of her residential programs includes: in the US (the apexart New York City Fellowship, NYC, 2014; Art OMI: Writers, Ledig House, NY, 2017; Hungary (Pecs Writers Program, Pecs, 2013), and Austria (Writers in Residence program, KulturKontakt Austria, Vienna, 2011).

Kršenković Brković was a Hubert Humphrey fellow 2005-06, which is a Fulbright Exchange Program. She spent a year in California and Washington DC, US. She also received an Austrian Government grant in order to carry out research at the University of Graz and at the Institut für Slawistik in Austria in 2008.

Besides, she participated in Rhodes, Greece (1st International Forum for a Culture of Peace by Mediterranean Women Creators, under the auspices of UNESCO); the 23rd Biennial of Illustration /BIB/ (Bratislava, 2011); the Bologna Book Fair (Bologna, 2011), the Goethe-Institut Munich (Leipzig Book Fair 2023), etc.

Her plays are performed in many Balkan countries. Four of her plays are set texts for elementary schools in Montenegro and Macedonia. Her book The Genie of Lake Manito was selected for the 2011 White Ravens Awards by the Internationale Jugendbibliothek in Munich, Germany. She has been nominated for Astrid Lindgren Memorial Award (ALMA) ten times (2008-2018). Two feature movies, Hozentarus (2018) and The Magic Key (2020), based on her fairy tales with the same titles, have been filmed by Public Broadcasting Services of Montenegro (RTCG).

Her stories have been published in many international magazines: October Hill Magazine, The Bosphorus Review of Books, Buchkultur, Blesok, Sarajevo Notebook, Folia linguistica et litteraria, etc.

Kršenković Brković has published three novels, two story collections, two literary studies, and several books of fairy tales.

== Bibliography ==
Fiction

- Dva talasa / Two Waves
- Atelanska igra / The Atellan Farce
- Izgubljeni pečat / The Lost Seal
- Vatra u Aleksandriji / The Fire in Alexandria
- Gospodarska palata / The Master's Palace
- Iza nevidljivog zida / Behind the Invisible Wall

Books of Fairy Tales

- Tajna jedne Tajne - Das Geheimnis /bilingual/
- Tajna jedne Tajne - Secret's Secret /bilingual/
- Modra planina / The Blue Mountain
- Muzičar s cilindrom i cvetom na reveru / Musician with a Cylinder and a Flower on His Lapel
- Tajna jedne Tajne / Secret's Secret
- Duh Manitog jezera / The Genie of Lake Manito
- Tajna plavog kristala /The Secret of a Blue Crystal

Non-fiction / Literary Studies

- Fragmenti: Zapisi o književnosti / Fragments: Records About Literature
- Poetika prolaznosti: Organizacija vremena u "Ranim jadima" Danila Kiša / The Poetics of Transience: Organisation of Time in Danilo Kiš's "Early Sorrows"
- Onirizam Edgara Alana Poa i egzistencijalni nemir Alise Ostrajker / Edgar Allan Poe's Oneirism and the Existential Angst of Alicia Ostriker
- Feministička revizija mitologije: Razbijanje patrijarhalnih obrazaca identifikacije žene u klasičnim bajkama / Feminist Revision of Mythology: Breaking the Patriarchal Patterns of the Women Identification in Classic Fairy Tales
- Zaboravljeno putovanje - tragovi utisnuti u bajkama / Forgotten Journey - Traces Imprinted in Fairy Tales
