= Dimitrije Popović =

Montenegrin-Croatian painter, sculptor and art critic (born 1951)

Dimitrije Popović (Serbian Cyrillic: Димитрије Поповић; born 4 March 1951) is an eminent Montenegrin and Croatian painter, sculptor, art critic and philosopher born in Cetinje, Montenegro. He attended elementary and high school in his hometown and graduated from the Academy of Fine Arts in Zagreb in 1976 in the class of professor Šime Perić.

Popović's works (drawings, prints, paintings, and sculptures) evolved thematically and technically through different phases, mostly inspired by Leonardo's drawings, surrealism, Ivan Meštrović's sculptures etc.

The artist lives and works in Croatia, but he made first public appearance in Cetinje in 1969 at the Art Salon of Youth. During the 1970s he exhibited in Podgorica, Bari (Italy), Dubrovnik and Zagreb.

During his residence in Paris in 1974 Popović met French art collector M. Davrier. In 1978 Davrier exhibited Popović's works at the Alexander Braumüller gallery with the paintings of Salvador Dalí, Ernst Fuchs, Leonor Fini, Mati Klarwein, Victor Brauner, and Miodrag Djuric - Dado, another distinguished artist from Cetinje.

The Liberty Gallery and Universal Fine Arts of Washington prepared in 1982 a combined exhibition of prints and other graphic works of Dalí and Popović in Pforzheim. During the celebration of the 400th anniversary of Leonardo da Vinci (1982), Dimitrije Popović exhibited in Palazzo Sormani in Milan a cycle of drawings entitled “Omaggio a Leonardo”. His crucifixions entitled "Corpus mysticum" were exhibited in Rome in Sant Andrea al Quirinale, Santa Maria del Popolo, and the Pantheon on the occasion of the celebration of two thousand years of Christianity. Croatian art critic Tonko Maroević wrote: “Popović’s achievement in his interpretation of the Biblical motif is first and foremost to be found in the universality of meaning, the transfer of temporally and spatially limited event into the general idiom of visual signs of the body. Of course, the meaning achieved is not restricted to the basic but rich in forebodings and motives, all leading into the disturbing sphere of the erotic” (From the preface to the art monograph "Dimtrije Popović – Judita, crteži", author: Tonko Maroević, published in Zagreb in 1986 by Grafički zavod Zagreb and Umjetnički muzej Cetinje).

Dimitrije Popović had about 60 solo exhibitions and participated in over 150 group exhibitions and art manifestations of another kind.

He also published several books and wrote for Slobodna Dalmacija, Vjesnik, Večernji list, and Montenegrin newspaper Vijesti.

== Museums and collections holding Popović’s works ==
- Belgrade: Muzej savremene umetnosti (Museum of the Contemporary Art); Narodni muzej (National Museum); Univerzitetska biblioteka Svetozar Marković (Belgrade University Library)
- Brussels: Royal Library of Belgium
- Cetinje: Umjetnički muzej Crne Gore (Art Museum of Montenegro)
- Düsseldorf: Heine-Museum
- Dubrovnik: Umjetnička zbirka samostana “Mala braća” (Art collection of the convent “Little Brothers»)
- Đakovo: Spomen zbirka “Josip Juraj Strossmayer” (Memorial collection “Josip Juraj Strossmayer”)
- Milan: Palazzo Sarmani
- Paris: Collection Davrier
- Padua: Museo civico
- Pau: Musee des Beaux Arts
- Petrinja: Muzej “Krsto Hegedušić” (Krsto Hegedusic Museum)
- Podgorica: Centar savremene umjetnosti (Contemporary Art Center); Moderna Galerija (Modern Art Gallery); Galerija Most (Gallery “The Bridge”)
- Rijeka: Moderna Galerija (Modern Gallery)
- Rome: Studio S – arte contemporanea
- Ravenna: Centro Dantesco
- Spoleto: Palazzo Comunale
- Savona: Museo d’arte Sandro Pertini
- Tuzla: Galerija jugoslovenskog portreta
- Vukovar: Muzej Vukovara (Civic Museum of Vukovar)
- Vatican City: Vatican Museums
- Zagreb: Zbirka nacionalne biblioteke (Collection of the National Library); Hrvatska akademija znanosti i umjetnosti (Croatian Academy of Arts and Sciences); Metropolitana
- Zbirka Biškupić (Biškupić Collection)
- Washington: Library of Congress

== Written works ==
- Veronikin rubac, published in 1996 by Matica hrvatska
- Smrt u slikarstvu, published in 2001 by Matica hrvatska
- Priče iz Arkadije, published in 2005 by Ex libris

== Documentary films about Dimitrije Popović ==
- Dimitrije Popović; author: Olga Perović, RTV Titograd 1981.
- Dimitrije Popović; author: Elsa de Giorgi, Teleroma 56, Rome, 1985.
- Dimitrije Popović; author: Miroslav Mahečić, HTV (Croatian Television), Zagreb 1987.
- Requiem; author: Silvije Hum, HTV (Croatian Television), Zagreb 1991.
- Dimitrije Popović; author: Eduard Galić, HTV (Croatian Television), Zagreb 1992.
- Dimitrije Popović; author: Bogdan Žižić, HTV (Croatian Television), Zagreb 1992.
- Dimitrije Popović; author: Eduard Galić, HTV (Croatian Television), Zagreb 1995.

== Bibliography ==
- Josip Depolo – Tonko Maroević – Veselko Tenžera, Dimitrije, edition: Mladi umjetnici (Young Artists), Nacionalna i sveučilišna biblioteka, Zagreb 1980, page 140.
- O.P (Olga Perović), Crna Gora, Likovna enciklopedija jugoslavije (Yugoslav Encyclopedia of Visual Arts), JLZ, Zagreb 1984, page 135, 235.
- Tonko Maroević, Dante i slavenski svijet / Dante e il mondo slavo, Hrvatska akademija znanosti i umjetnosti, Zagreb 1984.
- Božo Biškupić – Ivan Lacković Croata, Crteži, Nacionalna i sveučilišna biblioteka, GZH, Zagreb 1985.
- Mario Penelope – Sergio Guarino – Elsa de Giorgi, Corpus Mysticum, Biblioteca Segni, vol. XIII, Rome 1985.
- Tonko Maroević, Dimitrije – Judita, Grafički zavod Hrvatske – Umjetnički muzej Cetinje, Zagreb 1986.
- Igor Zidić, Likovna enciklopedija Jugoslavije (Yugoslav Encyclopedia of Visual Arts), vol. II, Zagreb 1986.
- Momo Kapor – Josip Depolo, Dimitrije, Književne novine, Beograd 1987.
- Grgo Gamulin, Na Itaci svijet otajni, Društvo povjesničara umjetnosti, vol. VI, Zagreb 1990.
- Božo Biškupić, Dimitrije – skulptura, Belus, Zagreb, 1994.
- Tonko Maroević – Goran Blagus, Dimitrije, 25 godina nadrealizma, Galerija Studio D, Zagreb 1995.
- Milan Marović, Dimitrije nepoznato-poznati, catalogue, Galerija Most, Podgorica 1998.
