= Montenegrin PEN Center =

- Formation: 15 March 1990; 36 years ago
- Location: 27 Novaka Miloševa, Podgorica
- Website: www.crnogorski-pen-centar.me

The Montenegrin PEN Center (Crnogorski PEN Centar) is the national chapter of the International PEN in Montenegro. It was formed in 1990, as one-party Communist rule in what was then Yugoslavia was ending.

The center has worked to promote the use of the Montenegrin literary standard of Serbo-Croatian. It published Vojislav Nikčević's Crnogorski pravopis in 1997, the first orthography for this written variant.
