= Miodrag Davidović =

Montenegrin businessman, economist and politician

Miodrag Davidović Миодраг Давидовић OSS, OHKM, MMftP

Member of the Municipal Assembly of Nikšić
- Incumbent
- Assumed office 7 May 2021
- President: Marko Kovačević

Personal details
- Born: 1957 (age 68–69) Nikšić, FPR Yugoslavia (now Montenegro)
- Party: Popular Movement (2020–present)
- Other political affiliations: ZBCG (2020); DSI (2019–2020); DF (2012–2020); SNP (until 2012)
- Education: University of Montenegro
- Occupation: Businessman, politician
- Website: dakadavidovic.me
- Nickname: "Daka"

Miodrag "Daka" Davidović (Serbian Cyrillic: Миодраг "Дака" Давидовић; born 1957) is a Montenegrin businessman, economist and politician, prominent representative of Serbs from Montenegro, benefactor of the Serbian Orthodox Church and a longtime financier of the Montenegrin opposition during the a thirty-year long DPS rule in Montenegro. Davidović is founder and the current leader of the Popular Movement, conservative political party in Montenegro.

== Biography ==
=== Early life and business career ===
Miodrag Davidović was born in 1957 in Nikšić, SR Montenegro, Socialist Federal Republic of Yugoslavia. He worked for 12 years as an economist and financial manager at the "Boris Kidrič" Nikšić Ironworks. In the 1990s, he was the head of the Nikšić local Police Department Security Center and a Minister of Trade in the SAO Herzegovina government. After the end of the Yugoslav Wars, Davidović began to actively engage in business. The company "Neksan" was founded in 1992 in his hometown of Nikšić, and is engaged in entrepreneurial activities, trade in petroleum products and production of alcoholic beverages. Davidović and his company ran the Nikšić Ironworks on two occasions.

=== Political career ===
In 2017, Davidović was the joint opposition candidate for mayor of Nikšić. Eventually, 2017 local election, was boycotted by all the opposition parties after the Government announced the imprisonment of the leaders of the opposition Democratic Front alliance, Andrija Mandić and Milan Knežević.

Only the ruling Democratic Party of Socialists and its minor partner the Social Democrats ran in the election, with voter turnout at 45%, while 11% of the votes cast were spoilt. He has established himself as a strong critic of the ruling Democratic Party of Socialists and Milo Đukanović and as a financier of their opponents.

In December 2019, Davidović survived an assassination attempt at the Crown Plaza Hotel in Belgrade (where Davidović has lived for several years), while he was in a meeting with Bishop Joanikije (Mićović). Ten years earlier, Daka Davidović was beaten with metal bars while jogging.

In May 2019 he became one of the founders of the For the Benefit of All, a big tent political alliance between Socialist People's Party of Vladimir Joković, United Montenegro of Goran Danilović, Workers' Party of Janko Vučinić and Independent parliamentary group composed of and two independent MPs, both elected from 2016 Key Coalition electoral list. Alliance eventually dissolved prior to the parliamentary election in August 2020, all three parties decided to join a pre-election coalition with right-wing Democratic Front (DF) alliance, employing a more significant cultural and socially conservative discourse, supporting 2019-2020 clerical protests in Montenegro and Serbian Orthodox Church rights in Montenegro.

Davidović is the de facto leader of the newly formed cultural conservative political alliance under the name Popular Movement (NP). In July 2020, United Montenegro, Workers' Party and Independent group in the parliament (composed of former members of SNP and DEMOS parties), agreed to ally, continuing its activity within the joint coalition with Democratic Front, Socialist People's Party and the True Montenegro. During, July 2020, Popular Movement was joined by another minor right-wing parties, such as the Democratic Party of Unity (DSJ) and Democratic Serb Party (DSS). On 2 August 2020, the Popular Movement officially decided to enter the common opposition electoral list with Democratic Front and the SNP, in order to participate at the forthcoming parliamentary election, forming big tent "For the Future of Montenegro" pre-election coalition. At the joint electoral list, NP leading candidate was United Montenegro member Vladimir Dobričanin, by holding seventh position on the list, their other candidate was Maksim Vučinić, leader of the Workers' Party, who hold only the twenty-seventh place on common electoral list. All constituent members of newly founded alliance employed a more significant cultural and socially conservative discourse, advocating Serbian Orthodox Church rights in Montenegro, due to the 2020 Montenegrin political crisis, and an open conflict between the Serbian Orthodox Church in Montenegro and the DPS-led Government of Montenegro, following the adoption of the disputed law on the status of religious communities in the country. The August 2020 election resulted in a victory for the opposition parties and the fall from power of the ruling DPS, which has ruled the country since the introduction of the multi-party system in 1990. Joint opposition coalition won 32.55% of popular vote and 27 seats in the parliament, while Zdravko Krivokapić, Montenegrin professor close to Davidović and the Serbian Orthodox Church in Montenegro leadership, was selected new prime minister-designate of Montenegro by the new parliamentary majority in September 2020, announcing economical reforms, fight against corruption, as well as withdrawal of the disputed law on religious communities.

During October and November 2020, Davidović repeatedly stated that the leaders of the populist Democratic Front (of which he was one of the founders in 2012, as well as longtime financier) were trying to obstruct the political agreement on forming a new government, by unfoundedly accusing him and the Serbian Orthodox Church in Montenegro of influencing Krivokapić's decisions, as well the composition of the new cabinet of the government of Montenegro. He told the media that the Democratic Front would not succeed in that because, as he said, "the prime minister-designate has the support of the people of Montenegro." On 21 November 2020, at the church's holiday of Holy Archangel Michael, Daka Davidović announced that he is founding a new political party under the name the Popular Movement (of Montenegro). He announced new party founding in front of the Monastery of Saint Sava at the Golija Mountain near Nikšić, which is his endowment. He said that the new party practically emerged from the For the Benefit of All coalition, which he initiated in May 2019. On 26 January 2021, it was announced that Daka's party will participate at the 2021 municipal elections in Nikšić.

=== Serbian Orthodox Church ===
Daka Davidović is the holder of the Medal of Merit to the People, the Order of Saint Sava, the Order of the Holy King Milutin and other high decorations of the Serbian Orthodox Church.

He is the founder of the monastery of St. Sava in Golija, as well as the donor and founder of a number of churches and monasteries in Montenegro, Republika Srpska and Serbia. He was a co-financier of a memorial museum in Stari Brod dedicated to the victims of the Stari Brod and Milošević massacres.

=== Personal life ===
Former President of Montenegro Momir Bulatović and Davidović shared a close social connection with each other.

=== Sanctions ===
On 16 November 2023 the U.S. Department of the Treasury's Office of Foreign Assets Control (OFAC) sanctioned Miodrag Davidović pursuant to E.O. 14033 for being responsible for or complicit in, or having directly or indirectly engaged in, corruption related to the Western Balkans.
