= Vladimir Dobričanin =

Montenegrin doctor and politician

- Владимир Добричанин

Member of Parliament
- Incumbent
- Assumed office 30 August 2020

Personal details
- Born: 5 August 1972 (age 54) Pristina, Serbia, Yugoslavia (now Kosovo)
- Party: UCG (2017–present); Demos (2015–2017)
- Children: 2
- Education: University of Pristina
- Occupation: Doctor, politician

Vladimir Dobričanin (Serbian Cyrillic: Владимир Добричанин; born 5 August 1972) is a Montenegrin doctor and politician who is currently active as a teaching associate in General Surgery at the Medical Faculty of the University of Montenegro. He is a member of the presidency of the United Montenegro (UCG), a conservative political party and got elected to the Montenegrin Parliament in 2020, elected from the For the Future of Montenegro electoral list.

== Early life and career ==
Dobričanin was born on 5 August 1972 to a Kosovo Serb family in Pristina which at that time was part of the Socialist Federal Republic of Yugoslavia. He finished middle school and high school in Pristina and later graduated from the Medical Faculty of the University of Pristina in 1998 with an average grade of 8.58. After graduation, he was employed at the Surgical Clinic at the Clinical Hospital Center Pristina. He completed postgraduate studies in the field of surgical anatomy in Pristina. In 2006, he defended his Master's thesis entitled Obstructive jaundice - etiology and treatment at the Medical Faculty of the University of Pristina. In the same year, he completed a specialization in general surgery.

From 1999 to 2006, he was an assistant trainee at the Department of General Surgery, Faculty of Medicine, University of Pristina and from 2006 to 2007, Assistant Professor at the Department of General Surgery, Faculty of Medicine, University of Prishtina. From 2008 to 2015 he served as the Director of the Emergency Center at the Clinical Center of Montenegro. From 2015 to 2017 he was Medical Director of the Clinical Center of Montenegro. In 2014, he was the founder and first president of the Union of Medical Doctors of Montenegro and served as the president until 2015. Currently, he is a teaching associate in General Surgery at the Medical Faculty of the University of Montenegro.

He requested resignations of the Minister of Health, Kenan Hrapović and other key people in the ministry after, what he claims, was a bad response to the COVID-19 pandemic in Montenegro. Dobričanin was a member of the Council for Civil Control of the Police, he resigned after the arrest of Bishop Joanikije, 7 priests of the Serbian Orthodox Church and the brutal beatings of the people in Pljevlja, but also in other cities of Montenegro, during the 2019-2020 clerical protests in Montenegro.

== Political career ==
Dobričanin was an influential member of DEMOS until 2017 when him and a conservative faction of DEMOS left the party and formed a new party called the United Montenegro. On 1 May 2019, the United Montenegro decided to sign an agreement with Socialist People's Party (SNP), Workers' Party (RP) and Independent parliamentary group to form a new catch-all political alliance under the name For the Benefit of All (Da svako ima).

Alliance eventually dissolved prior the parliamentary election in August 2020. In July 2020 United Montenegro, jointly with the Workers' Party and Independent group in the parliament (composed of former members of SNP and DEMOS parties), agreed to form a new cultural conservative political alliance under the name Popular Movement (NP), employing a more significant cultural and socially conservative discourse, supporting 2019-2020 clerical protests in Montenegro and Serbian Orthodox Church rights in Montenegro, continuing its activity within the joint electoral list with Democratic Front and the SNP. Popular Movement participated in the election in a coalition called For the Future of Montenegro.

Dobričanin received the seventh position on the combined electoral list and was elected to the Parliament after the coalition won 32.55% of popular vote and 27 seats in the parliament.
