= Goran Danilović =

Montenegrin politician

Goran Danilović Горан Даниловић

Member of Parliament
- In office 28 November 2016 – 30 August 2020
- President: Ivan Brajović
- In office 10 December 2006 – 12 May 2016
- President: Ranko Krivokapić

Minister of Internal Affairs
- In office 12 May 2016 – 28 November 2016
- Prime Minister: Milo Đukanović
- Preceded by: Raško Konjević
- Succeeded by: Mevludin Nuhodžić

Personal details
- Born: 1971 (age 54–55) Titograd, SR Montenegro, SFR Yugoslavia (now Podgorica, Montenegro)
- Party: UCG (2017–present)
- Other political affiliations: Demos (2015–2017); NSD (2009–2014); SNS (2001–2009)
- Education: University of Montenegro

Goran Danilović (Serbian Cyrillic: Горан Даниловић; born 1971) is a Montenegrin politician, former member of Parliament of Montenegro and former Minister of Internal Affairs. In 2016 he was the founder and was named the first president of the conservative political party called United Montenegro.

== Biography ==
=== Early life ===
Danilović was born in 1971 in Titograd (now Podgorica) which at the time was a part of the Socialist Federal Republic of Yugoslavia.

He finished middle school at the Morača Monastery, high school in Kolašin and later he graduated at the Faculty of Philosophy in Nikšić. He is one of the founders and the first editors of religious and cultural Radio Svetigora and was the editor in chief of the renewed weekly paper "Voice of the Montenegrins".

=== Political career ===
He was one of the founders and former vice-president of both New Serb Democracy (2009-14) and DEMOS (2015-17) political parties.

He served as the Minister of Interior Affairs in the provisional Government of Montenegro which lasted from May to November 2016. After the 2016 parliamentary election conservative faction of the DEMOS led by Danilović defected the party and formed new political subject United Montenegro, represented by two MPs in the Parliament of Montenegro.

On 1 May 2019, the United Montenegro decided to sign an agreement with Socialist People's Party (SNP), Workers' Party (RP) and Independent parliamentary group to form a new catch-all political alliance under the name For the Benefit of All (Da svako ima). For the Benefit of All alliance eventually dissolved prior the parliamentary election in August 2020.

In July 2020 Danilović's United Montenegro, jointly with the Workers' Party and Independent group in the parliament (composed of former members of SNP and DEMOS parties), agreed to form a new cultural conservative political alliance under the name Popular Movement (NP), employing a more significant cultural and socially conservative discourse, supporting 2019-2020 clerical protests in Montenegro and Serbian Orthodox Church rights in Montenegro, continuing its activity within the joint electoral list with Democratic Front (DF) and the Socialist People's Party (SNP).

On 15 October 2021, he was named the acting director of the Agency for Control and Quality Assurance of Higher Education. On 15 June 2023, he was appointed director. He was removed from his position by the government on 14 January 2025.

== See also ==
- United Montenegro
