= Vladimir Joković =

Montenegrin politician and former karatista

- Владимир Јоковић
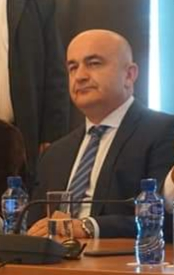
- Joković in 2019

Deputy Prime Minister of Montenegro
- In office 28 April 2022 – 31 October 2023
- Prime Minister: Dritan Abazović

Minister of Agriculture, Forestry and Water Management of Montenegro
- Incumbent
- Assumed office 28 April 2022
- Prime Minister: Dritan Abazović; Milojko Spajić
- Preceded by: Aleksandar Stijović

Member of the Parliament of Montenegro
- In office 23 September 2020 – 28 April 2022
- President: Aleksa Bečić

President of Karate Federation of Montenegro
- In office 13 May 2017 – 12 January 2019
- Preceded by: Dragan Šakotić
- Succeeded by: Ivan Krstajić

Personal details
- Born: 2 January 1967 (age 59) Plužine, SFR Yugoslavia (now Montenegro)
- Party: Socialist People's Party
- Profession: Politician, sports administrator

Medal record

Men's karate

Representing FR Yugoslavia

European Championship
| Silver medal – second place | 1994 Birmingham | Kumite +80 kg |

Vladimir Joković (Serbian Cyrillic: Владимир Јоковић; born 2 January 1967) is a Montenegrin politician, sports administrator and former karateka who served as the deputy prime minister of Montenegro and the minister of agriculture, forestry and water management since 28 April 2022.

He is the current leader of the Socialist People's Party (SNP), since August 2017, and served as a member of the Parliament of Montenegro, elected from the For the Future of Montenegro (ZBCG) common electoral list, at the 2020 parliamentary election. He also currently serves as the President of the Assembly of the Karate Federation of Montenegro, since 2019, having previously served as President of the Federation.

== Biography ==
Vladimir Joković was born in Plužine, a small town in northwestern Montenegro, at that time part of the Socialist Republic of Montenegro within the Socialist Federal Republic of Yugoslavia. He finished elementary and Electrotechnical High school in Nikšić. He is married and has two daughter and son.

=== Sports career ===
He represented FR Yugoslavia from 1991 to 2000. He has won many awards for his sportsmanship. He is one of the most famous karate masters from Montenegro. He has a 4th Dan black belt in karate and is the winner of multiple national Serbia and Montenegro and regional Balkans Karate Championships. In May 2017 Joković became the president of the Montenegrin Karate Federation.

=== Political career ===
Joković has been a member of the Socialist People's Party of Montenegro (SNP) since the 1990s. After Socialist People's Party President Srđan Milić resigned due to poor results at 2016 parliamentary elections. Joković, supported by a party faction led by former president of the party parliamentary club Aleksandar Damjanović and then-current mayor of Berane Dragoslav Šćekić, was elected President of the party at the SNP's eight congress held on 13 August 2017, defeating the favored candidated Snežana Jonica, who was supported by the faction close to former party leader Milić. Prior to the party's congress in August 2017, Joković was a member of the SNP municipal board in Plužine, as well as one of the party's councilors in the local parliament.

On 1 May 2019 the SNP signed an agreement with the Independent Parliamentary Group of Parliament of Montenegro composed of United Montenegro (UCG), Workers' Party (RP) and two independent MPs, including former SNP high-ranking member Aleksandar Damjanović, forming a new catch-all alliance named For the Benefit of All. The alliance eventually dissolved prior the parliamentary election in August 2020, with all three parties joining a pre-election coalition with the right-wing Democratic Front (DF) alliance, under the name For the Future of Montenegro, employing a more significant cultural and socially conservative discourse, supporting 2019-2020 clerical protests in Montenegro and Serbian Orthodox Church rights in Montenegro. As the leader of the SNP, Joković received the fifth position on the combined electoral list and was elected to the Parliament of Montenegro after the coalition won 32.55% of popular vote and 27 MPs out of the 81 total seats in the parliament of Montenegro).

Since 28 April 2022, he has been serving as the minister of agriculture, forestry and water management in the minority government of Dritan Abazović.
