= For the Benefit of All =

Political alliance in Montenegro

For the Benefit of All Da svako ima Да свако има
- Leader: Vladimir Joković
- Initiator: Miodrag Davidović
- Founded: 1 May 2019
- Dissolved: August 2020
- Succeeded by: For the Future of Montenegro
- Headquarters: Podgorica
- Ideology: Catch-all alliance Pro-Europeanism
- Political position: Big tent
- Parliament (2020): 7 / 81
- Local Parliaments (2020): 63 / 786

For the Benefit of All (Montenegrin: Da svako ima / Да свако има) was an opposition catch-all and pro-EU political alliance in Montenegro. It is composed of the Socialist People's Party (SNP), United Montenegro (UCG) and Workers' Party (RP), as well as some independents. The main goal of the alliance was to overthrow the ruling Democratic Party of Socialists of Montenegro (DPS) of President Milo Đukanović, which has been in power since its founding in 1991.

== History ==
The alliance was formed on 1 May 2019 in Bijelo Polje, by signing an agreement between Socialist People's Party (SNP) of Vladimir Joković with Independent parliamentary group composed of United Montenegro (UCG), Workers' Party (RP, former Democratic Front member) and two independent MPs, Aleksandar Damjanović and Anka Vukićević, both elected from 2016 Key Coalition electoral list. Damjanović rejoined the Socialist People's Party in early 2020.

== Alliance composition ==
Member party	Ideology (2019)	Position (2019)	Leader (2019)	MPs (2019-20)
Socialist People's Party	Social democracy Social conservatism	Syncretic	Vladimir Joković	3 / 81
United Montenegro (DEMOS split)	Conservatism; Pro-Europeanism	Centre-right	Goran Danilović	2 / 81
Workers' Party	Labour rights Left populism	Syncretic	Janko Vučinić	1 / 81
Independent politician (DEMOS split)	Conservatism; Pro-Europeanism	Centre-right	Anka Vukićević	1 / 81

== Dissolution ==
Alliance eventually dissolved prior the parliamentary election in August 2020, all three parties decided to join a pre-election coalition with populist Democratic Front (DF) alliance, employing and more significant cultural and socially conservative discourse, supporting 2019-2020 clerical protests in Montenegro and Serbian Orthodox Church rights in Montenegro.
