= Zdravko Krivokapić =

Prime Minister of Montenegro from 2020 to 2022

- Здравко Кривокапић
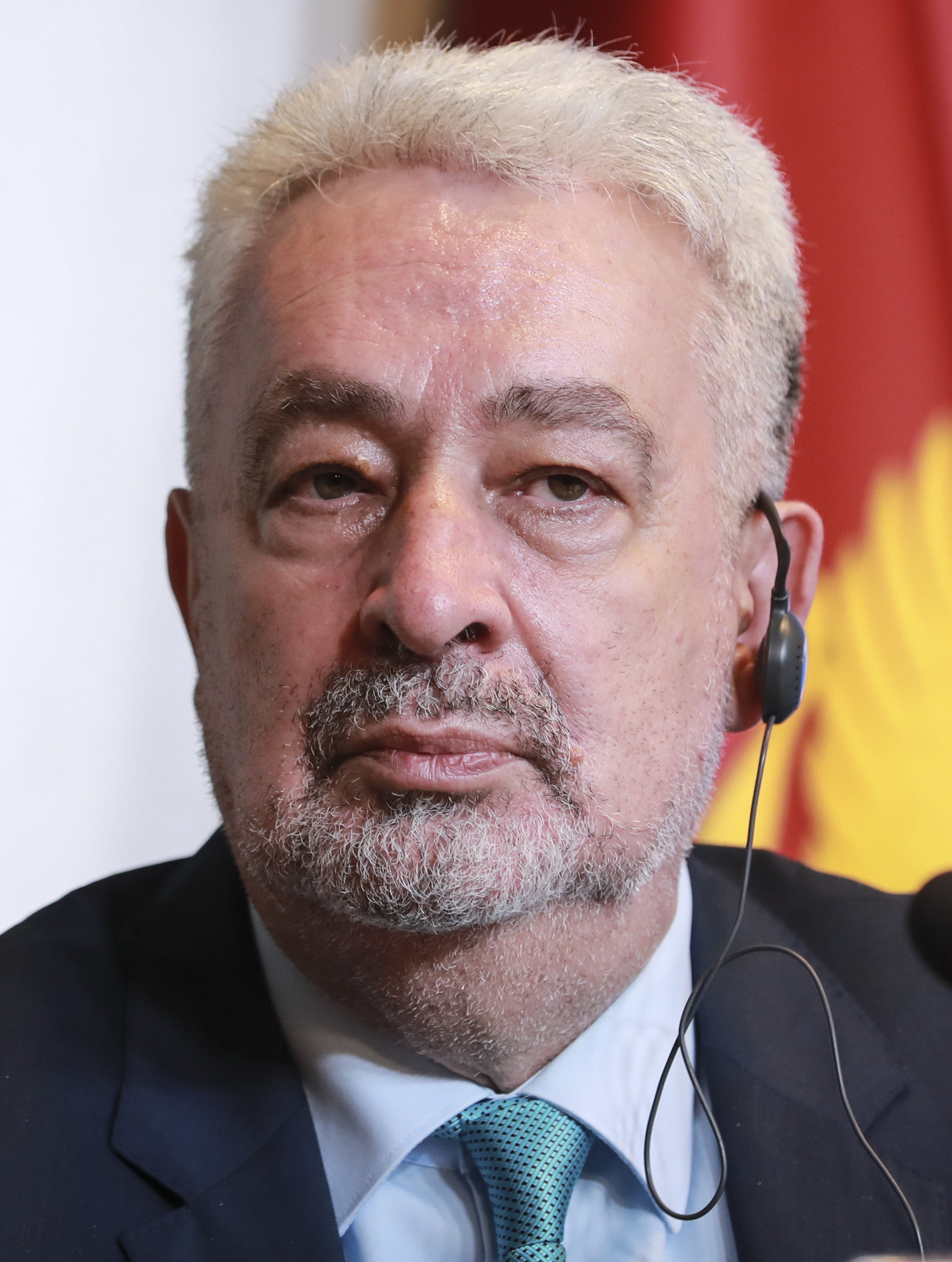
- Krivokapić in 2021

Prime Minister of Montenegro
- In office 4 December 2020 – 28 April 2022
- President: Milo Đukanović
- Deputy: Dritan Abazović
- Preceded by: Duško Marković
- Succeeded by: Dritan Abazović
Ministerial offices
Minister of Justice and Human and Minority Rights
Acting
In office 24 January 2022 – 28 April 2022
Prime Minister	Himself
Preceded by	Sergej Sekulović (acting)
Succeeded by	Marko Kovač
In office 17 June 2021 – 1 July 2021
Prime Minister	Himself
Preceded by	Vladimir Leposavić
Succeeded by	Sergej Sekulović (acting)
Parliamentary offices
Member of Parliament
In office 23 September 2020 – 4 December 2020
President	Miodrag Lekić (acting); Aleksa Bečić
Representing	For the Future
Additional positions
Chairman of Ne damo Crnu Goru
In office 9 July 2020 – 1 August 2020
Deputy	Ratko Mitrović
Preceded by	Office established
Succeeded by	Vesna Bratić
President of the Board of directors of the Accreditation Body of Montenegro
In office October 2007 – September 2016
President	Filip Vujanović
Prime Minister	Željko Šturanović; Milo Đukanović; Igor Lukšić

Personal details
- Born: 2 September 1958 (age 68) Nikšić, PR Montenegro, FPR Yugoslavia
- Party: Independent (since 2023); Christian Democratic Movement (2022–2023); Ne damo Crnu Goru (2020–2023); For the Future (in 2020); League of Communists of Yugoslavia (in 1976)
- Children: 5
- Education: University of Montenegro; University of Belgrade
- Profession: Professor, politician
- Website: Official website

Zdravko Krivokapić (Serbo-Croat Cyrillic: Здравко Кривокапић; born 2 September 1958) is a Montenegrin professor and former politician who served as Prime Minister of Montenegro from 2020 to 2022.

In addition to his professorship at the Universities of Montenegro and East Sarajevo, he is one of the founders of the non-governmental organization called "We won't give up Montenegro", which was founded by Montenegrin professors and intellectuals in support of the Serbian Orthodox Church in Montenegro after a controversial religion law targeted the legal status and the property of the Church. In August 2020, he was chosen as the ballot representative for the For the Future of Montenegro list which placed second in the 2020 parliamentary election. Together with Aleksa Bečić and Dritan Abazović, he agreed to form a technocratic government and in December 2020 he and his cabinet were sworn into office. Krivokapić, who headed a right-wing populist list in the election, later affiliated himself with the centrist Democratic Montenegro of the President of the Parliament Aleksa Bečić, and he himself has been ideologically described as a moderate Christian democrat.

Krivokapić was ousted in a motion of no confidence on 4 February 2022, although he continued serving in acting capacity until 28 April 2022, when he was succeeded by Dritan Abazović.

== Early life and academic career ==
Krivokapić was born to Serbian Orthodox parents Drago and Ikonija, in 1958 in Nikšić, which at the time was a part of the SR Montenegro, FPR Yugoslavia. He joined the League of Communists of Yugoslavia in 1976. He graduated in 1981 from the Faculty of Mechanical Engineering, in the Department of Production Engineering at the University of Montenegro. He enrolled in postgraduate studies in 1983 in the field of Production Engineering at the Faculty of Mechanical Engineering, University of Belgrade. He defended his master's thesis called "Planning and Management of Spare Parts Stocks" in 1989.

He received his doctorate in 1993 at the Faculty of Mechanical Engineering in Podgorica. The topic of the dissertation was called "Contribution to the automatic design of the technological process of cutting by means of an expert system".

After completing his internship at the "Boris Kidrič" steel manufacturing company in Nikšić in 1982, he was elected an assistant trainee at the Department of Production Engineering at the Faculty of Mechanical Engineering in Podgorica in 1983. He was elected assistant professor 1994. He was elected associate professor at the University of Montenegro in 1999 and became a full professor in 2004, when he was elected in the subjects of Informatics and Quality Management System.

He is the president of the organizing and member of the program committee of the SQM Conference and the ICQME International Conference. He is the editor of the International Journal for Quality Research, indexed in the SCOPUS database, which has been published since 2007. He is a member of the program board of four journals and thirteen international conferences. He is a member of the American Society for Quality (ASQ) and Head of the Center for Doctoral Studies at the University of Montenegro. As part of his scientific research, he has published more than 250 papers in international journals, domestic journals, international conferences and domestic conferences. He is the author of 16 books and textbooks.

== Teaching profession ==
In 2011, six years before Montenegro joined NATO, Krivokapić was hired by the Ministry of Defence (MoD) of the Government of Montenegro for education on the procedures for introducing a quality system and ways to implement standards related to the NATO quality management system.

He also has taught information technology at the Theological Seminary in Cetinje since 1998.

== Political career ==
=== Entering politics ===
Krivokapić was part of 2019 anti-corruption protests and 2020 religion law protests. He decided to enter political life of Montenegro in mid-2020, at the height of the political crisis in Montenegro, and the open conflict between the Serbian Orthodox Church in Montenegro and the DPS-led Montenegrin government, following the adoption of the disputed law on the status of religious communities in Montenegro, supporting 2019–2020 clerical protests and Serbian Orthodox Church (SPC) rights in Montenegro. He was elected the first president of the SPC-backed "We won't give up Montenegro" (Ne damo Crnu Goru) NGO founded by Montenegrin professors and intellectuals in support of the SPC. In a short period of time, the organization organized public events in which Bishop of Budimlja and Nikšić Joanikije (Mićović) and the Rector of the Theological Seminary in Cetinje, Gojko Perović participated, among others.

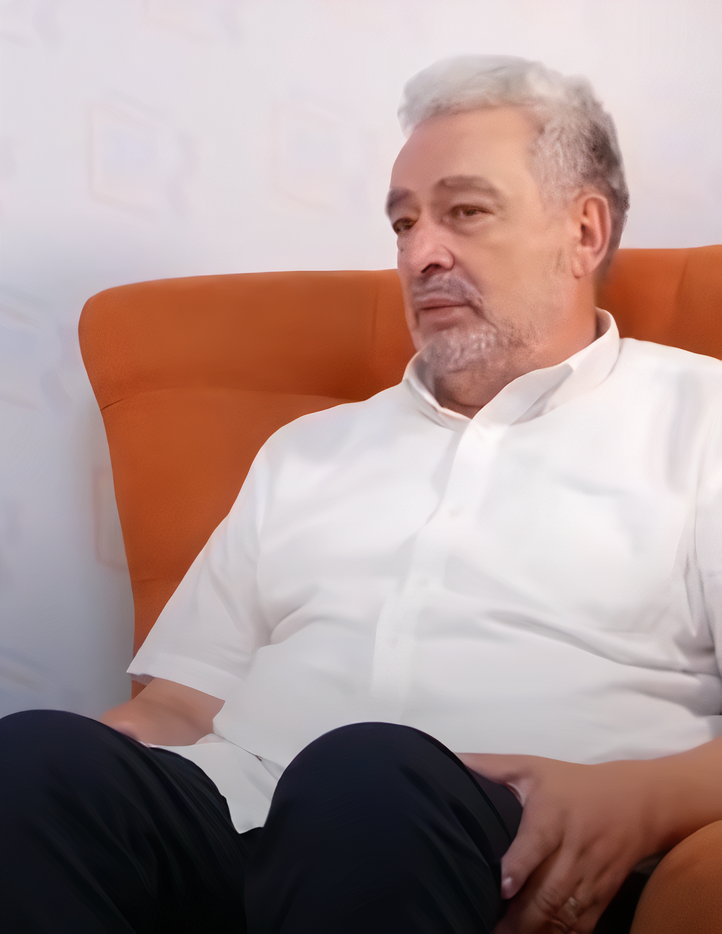
Professor Krivokapić in August 2020.

On 1 August 2020 right-wing Democratic Front, Popular Movement and Socialist People's Party agreed to form a pre-election opposition alliance under the name For the Future of Montenegro (Za budućnost Crne Gore), as did some of right-wing non-parliamentary subjects. Krivokapić headed the joint electoral list for the parliamentary election in August 2020. The same day, Krivokapić resigned as executive director of the NGO, as he would head the opposition list. Krivokapić said that the primary goals of the coalition in case they form the government will be the protection of human rights as well as ensuring freedom of speech, freedom of media, freedom of thought, and the freedom of religion. Krivokapić said that the person who influenced him the most to enter politics was a Montenegrin businessman Miodrag "Daka" Davidović, de facto leader of the Popular Movement, who survived an assassination attempt in December 2019 in Belgrade.

On 24 July 2020 after an opposition rally, criminal charges were filed against Krivokapić and five Eastern Orthodox priests due to the "existence of a well-founded suspicion that they committed the criminal offense of non-compliance with health regulations for the suppression of a dangerous infectious disease."

Zdravko Krivokapić also sent letters to foreign ambassadors in Montenegro and In his address to the ambassadors, he said that the coalition wanted to draw the ambassadors' attention to a case of drastic human rights violations, "which we believe could be a worrying introduction to the upcoming abuse of Interior Ministry members to escalate the political crisis and intimidate the population ahead of the upcoming elections." He has been rated as the most popular political leader ahead of the 30 August 2020 parliamentary and local elections in Montenegro.

=== 2020 elections ===
The 2020 elections had the highest voter turnout ever recorded in Montenegro at 75.90%. Shortly after the polls were closed, before the final results were published, Krivokapić announced the coalition's victory stating that "freedom has happened in Montenegro". In his speech he also stated that there won't be revanchism and he also offered ethnic minority parties to enter the new government. The coalition won 32.55% of the popular vote which equals 27 seats in the parliament. This is the first time that the ruling coalition lost the majority in the parliament. He said that Montenegro cannot and won't be under influence of Serbia or Russia, but that his government will establish better diplomatic relations with both countries, also naming accession of Montenegro to the European Union, as the main priority of the new ruling coalition. Krivokapić and the leaders of the coalitions Peace is Our Nation and Black on White, Aleksa Bečić and Dritan Abazović, agreed during meeting on several principles on which the future government will rest, including the formation of an expert government, continuing to work on the European Union accession process, fight against corruption, overcoming society polarization and economic crisis, as well as amending and revising discriminatory laws and bylaws, including the controversial Freedom of Religion Law. He said that the new government in Montenegro would help make the lives of Serbs in Kosovo dignified and preserve monasteries there.

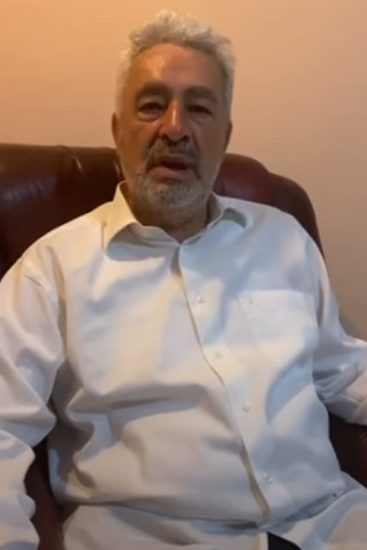
Krivokapić appealing to opposition supporters not to fall for the provocations of the government one day after the elections.

Massive celebrations were held all over Montenegro the day after the elections. In Podgorica, opposition supporters clashed with the ruling DPS supporters. Condemning ethnic hatred and unrest, for which he accuses the DPS-led government, Krivokapić said that no one in Montenegro should be endangered, especially national minorities, which he called "our relatives and neighbors". Krivokapić also called on supporters to stay at home, as well as demanding to authorities to investigate incidents and prosecute delinquents and perpetrators of the unrest, as soon as possible. He also welcomed minority parties of Bosniaks and Albanians of Montenegro, and wished to form government with them. On 2 September, glass was broken on the door of the Islamic Community of Pljevlja and a threatening message was left. Krivokapić condemned the incidents and also expressed suspicion that it was done by the outgoing DPS-led regime. He also protested with the Serbian Orthodox Church priests in front of the Husein-paša's Mosque, with the message that they are ready to defend the places of worship of all religious communities. Krivokapić stated that it is not his priority to have an official position in the new government, but that, as Prime Minister, he would like to visit Germany first, which he perceives as the most influential country in the EU. However, one day later, he said that he won't be the Prime Minister designate. Krivokapić stated that he would not go through the streets of Podgorica in a Mercedes and with numerous security guards. He said that Serbia and Montenegro are the two closest countries, geographically, culturally and historically, and their relations must be normalized, and that that is the wish of the vast majority of Montenegrin citizens but that the de-recognition of Kosovo is not going to be a priority for the new government.

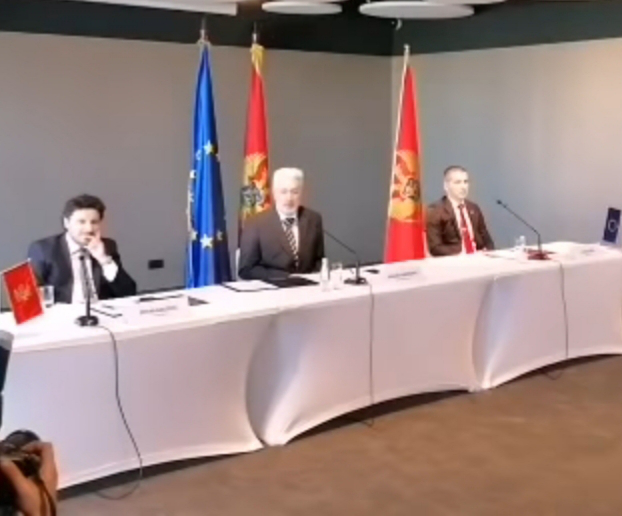
Dritan Abazović, Zdravko Krivokapić and Aleksa Bečić at the signing of the agreement on the principles of the new government of Montenegro on 9 September 2020.

On 9 September 2020, Krivokapić along with the leaders of the coalitions Peace is Our Nation and Black on White, Aleksa Bečić and Dritan Abazović signed an agreement pledging that the new government would not launch any initiatives or procedures aimed at changing the national flag, coat of arms and anthem and the de-recognition of Kosovo. The agreement also states that the new democratic government in Montenegro will responsibly implement all international obligations undertaken by the state, strengthen and improve cooperation with NATO and quickly, fully and committedly implement all reforms necessary for Montenegro's full membership in the EU. Krivokapic said that the new government is preparing for the worst-case scenario when it comes to the economy. The same day, he also stated that he is worried because no other countries in the region congratulated him. In response to the allegations that his coalition has close ties to the Serbian president, Aleksandar Vučić, he said that he never even met Vučić. In an interview to Die Welt, Krivokapić said that when he was in West Germany in 1988, he saw Helmut Kohl being followed by only one bodyguard car and that he was chatting with gathered people and that this was his first meeting with democracy; explaining that this is exactly the kind of head of government he wants to be like: "someone who can be talked to and criticized".

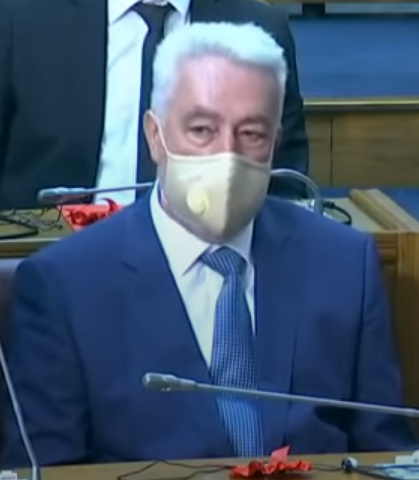
Krivokapić at the first session of the new assembly of the Parliament of Montenegro on 23 September 2020.

On 11 September, Krivokapić honored 9/11 victims and stated that the new government will reaffirm its commitment to fighting terrorism and combating all forms of extremism with its allies. Serbian pro-government tabloids have unanimously criticized the coalition agreement between three new parliamentary majority lists, for agreeing not to discuss changing national symbols of Montenegro, the de-recognition of Kosovo, or the country's withdrawal from the NATO, during the new government term, calling Krivokapić "Amfilohije's Prime Minister"

Responding to this criticism, he said in an interview to the Sarajevo-based Face TV that he is aware that Aleksandar Vučić and Milo Đukanović are in a much closer connection than him and someone closest to him and that the pro-government tabloids in Serbia are attacking him because Montenegrin president Đukanović and Serbian president Vučić are still in good relations, which Vučić has denied, urging Krivokapić to either publish evidence of his business relations with Đukanović or admit he lied. Krivokapić also stated that it is scandalous that Vučić did not visit Montenegro for 8 years he has been in power. On 22 September 2020, a meeting was held in Ostrog Monastery between the opposition representatives, Metropolitan Amfilohije and Bishop Joanikije. According to Vijesti news, Dritan Abazović proposed Krivokapic as prime minister, however, the leaders of the Democratic Front, Andrija Mandić and Milan Knežević stated that Krivokapić no longer has the full support within the For the Future of Montenegro coalition, mostly because of his critical attitude towards Vučić and his regime in Serbia, and that they cannot support him as the designate until they question the trust in him at the party meeting.

=== Prime minister ===
On 23 September, all 41 deputies of the three coalitions of the new majority in parliament officially supported Zdravko Krivokapić as the prime minister-designate, as well as electing Aleksa Bečić new President of the Parliament. On 30 September, Krivokapić started initial talks with representatives of the parties of the three coalitions, which formed the parliamentary majority in Montenegro about forming the new government. On 8 October, Krivokapić formally became the Prime Minister-designate after the President Đukanović has given him a mandate to form the new government.

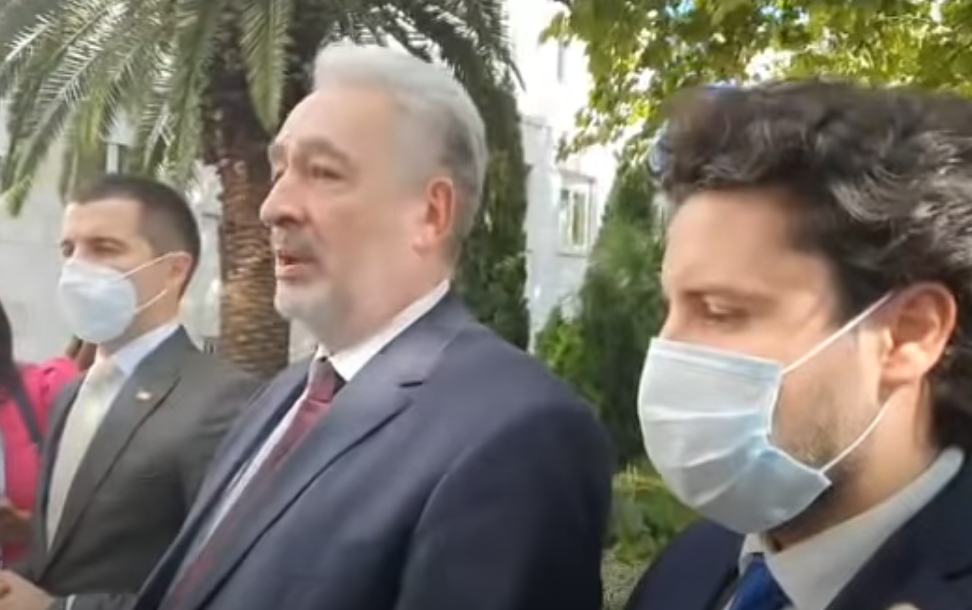
Bečić, Krivokapić, and Abazović holding a press conference on 8 October 2020 after President Đukanović has given Krivokapić the mandate to form the new government.

On 24 October, Krivokapic denied the populist Democratic Front allegations, that any party in the winning coalition is excluded from the government formation process, but that insisting on individuals from those parties was not in the interest of citizens or the country, continuing to insist on forming an expert government, without compromised figures of new majority in it, the media later reported that they were the leaders of the Democratic Front alliance, Andrija Mandić, Milan Knežević and Nebojša Medojević. All three have repeatedly conditioned their parties' support for the new cabinet, during October, if they were not part of the new government. Mandić explicitly asked Krivokapić to "return the mandate and that they would look for a new designate". Medojević even accused Krivokapić that the Metropolitanate of Montenegro and the Littoral, Montenegrin-Serbian businessman Daka Davidović, but also the United States and United Kingdom Embassies in Podgorica and Montenegrin media publishers Miodrag Perović ("Monitor") and Željko Ivanović ("Vijesti"), have the greatest influence on him, as PM designate, and the composition of his cabinet.

Speaking to the media on 29 October about the composition of Montenegro's future government, Krivokapić openly stated that it would have a "lower level of reputation" if it included political leaders of the Democratic Front. "It would be a government that would not be wholeheartedly accepted by the relevant international institutions," he said, accusing party leaders of not thinking about the interests of the people, as well as prolonging the formation of the government for their personal and party interests. Krivokapić also said that the decades-long opposition had failed to win the election because the DPS-led regime knew those people very well. After the interview, Democratic Front leaders accused Krivokapic of making a deal with Milo Đukanović and the DPS, Mandić also claimed that Krivokapić had been appointed leader of the electoral list after "pressure and conditioning of electoral support" by "parts of the Serbian Orthodox Church", adding that the entire financing of the election campaign was provided by the Democratic Front, and that "those (Church) who demanded that Krivokapić lead the common list did not give a single cent for the campaign", accusing parts of the church and Krivokapić of "acting on someone's orders from abroad". After a series of accusations by the leaders of the Democratic Front, Krivokapić scheduled a meeting with all parties in the new parliamentary majority for 30 October, in order to overcome misunderstandings and dilemmas regarding the formation of a new government. The meeting eventually confirmed the support of all parties of the new majority for Krivokapić's concept of an expert government, in which part will not be a party leaders.

On 1 November Zdravko Krivokapić was, along with Serbian Patriarch Irinej, Bishop of Budimlja and Nikšić Joanikije Mićović and Serbian poet and academic, Matija Bećković, one of those who gave a speech in front of the gathered and mourning believers at the funeral of his spiritual father and close friend, longtime Metropolitan of Montenegro and the Littoral Amfilohije Radović, in the Cathedral of the Resurrection of Christ in Podgorica. Krivokapić pointed out that Amfilohije once again gathered them all together, calling the gathering of people from all over Montenegro "the crown of all prayer gatherings (litijas)", referring to the recent mass prayer gatherings (litije), which were organized during 2019 and 2020, as a protest against the controversial religion law, and which was led by Amfilohije. In his speech, Krivokapić also recalled the evening when he met with Amfilohije on the night after the 30 August elections, which ended the believers struggle for withdraw the discriminatory law, which targeted the church. On that occasion, the Metropolitan told him "we are so blessed" in a cordial embrace. He said that every meeting with Amfilohije was a great joy and learning, reminding that Amfilohije testified to sincerity and truth, and that is why his words resound loudly and are heard far away. In his speech, Krivokapić also referred to Amfilohije's role in re-establishing the faith and restoring holy places in Montenegro since the fall of communism in 1990, "Although you resurrected Montenegro, you experienced suffering and persecution, by your own people", he said.

Krivokapić previously publicly asked the outgoing Cabinet of Duško Marković to declare a day of mourning on the occasion of the death of the Metropolitan of Montenegro and the Littoral, which the government refused to do, while several municipalities declared a day of mourning at the local level; Andrijevica, Budva, Berane, Kotor, Herceg Novi, Tivat and Plužine.

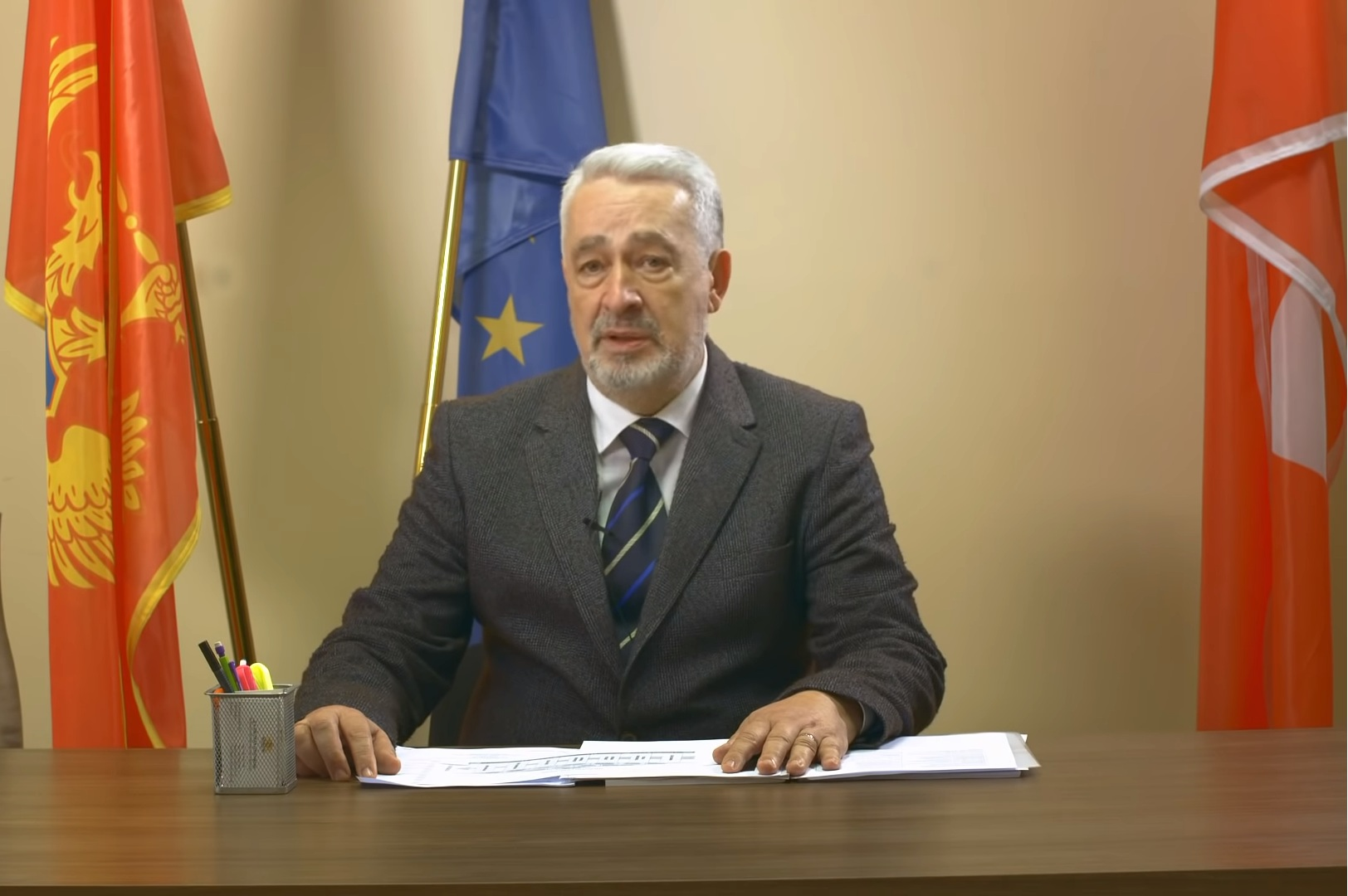
Prime Minister-designate Zdravko Krivokapić presents the composition of new cabinet of the government of Montenegro, Podgorica, 5 November 2020.

On 5 November 2020, Krivokapić announced the composition of his cabinet, in which the number of ministers in the cabinet will be reduced to 12 due to the rationalization of the state administration, which is 8 less than in the previous cabinet, which is why some departments were merged and some abolished. Krivokapić said that the model was modeled on the Netherlands and Finland, as examples of good practice, and that basically rationalization should offer an answer to the challenges facing Montenegro, and that the future cabinet will be based on four key areas that are currently most important for Montenegro, namely; the rule of law, finance, education and health. However, shortly after Krivokapić's nomination, some leaders from the coalition parties expressed their dissatisfaction with the decision of Krivokapić. According to the final agreement of the supporting parties, the new government will be limited to one year, with the main goals; the fight against corruption and the depoliticization of public institutions after 30 years of DPS rule, as well as the reform of electoral laws, due to the preparation of an atmosphere for holding a new, "first fairly organized" elections in Montenegro.

Some parties that were part of the former regime, including DPS, LP and SD, accused Prime Minister-designate Krivokapić of selecting "exclusively Orthodox Serbs" to the new government, while at the same time, some members of the new majority (Democratic Front alliance parliamentary group) claimed that "authentic Serb representatives in Montenegro" are not even part of the new cabinet. Both sides (the DPS and DF) were united in criticizing the alleged impact of the Metropolitanate of Montenegro and the Littoral (of the Serbian Orthodox Church) on the formation of Krivokapic's cabinet.

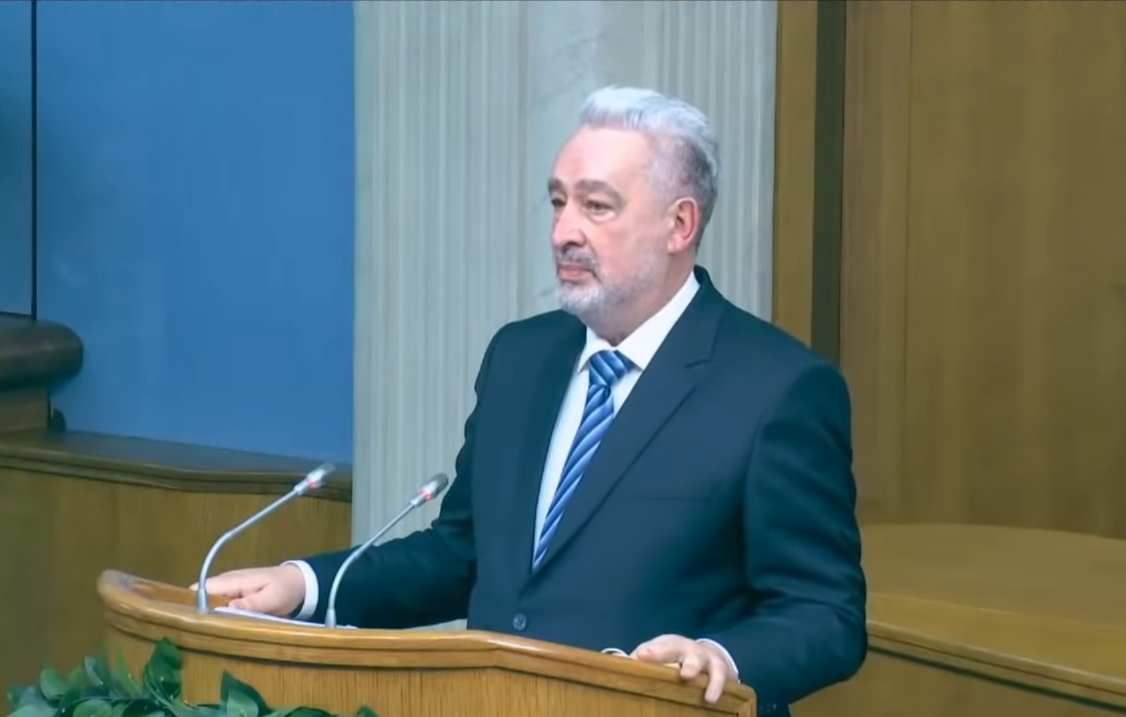
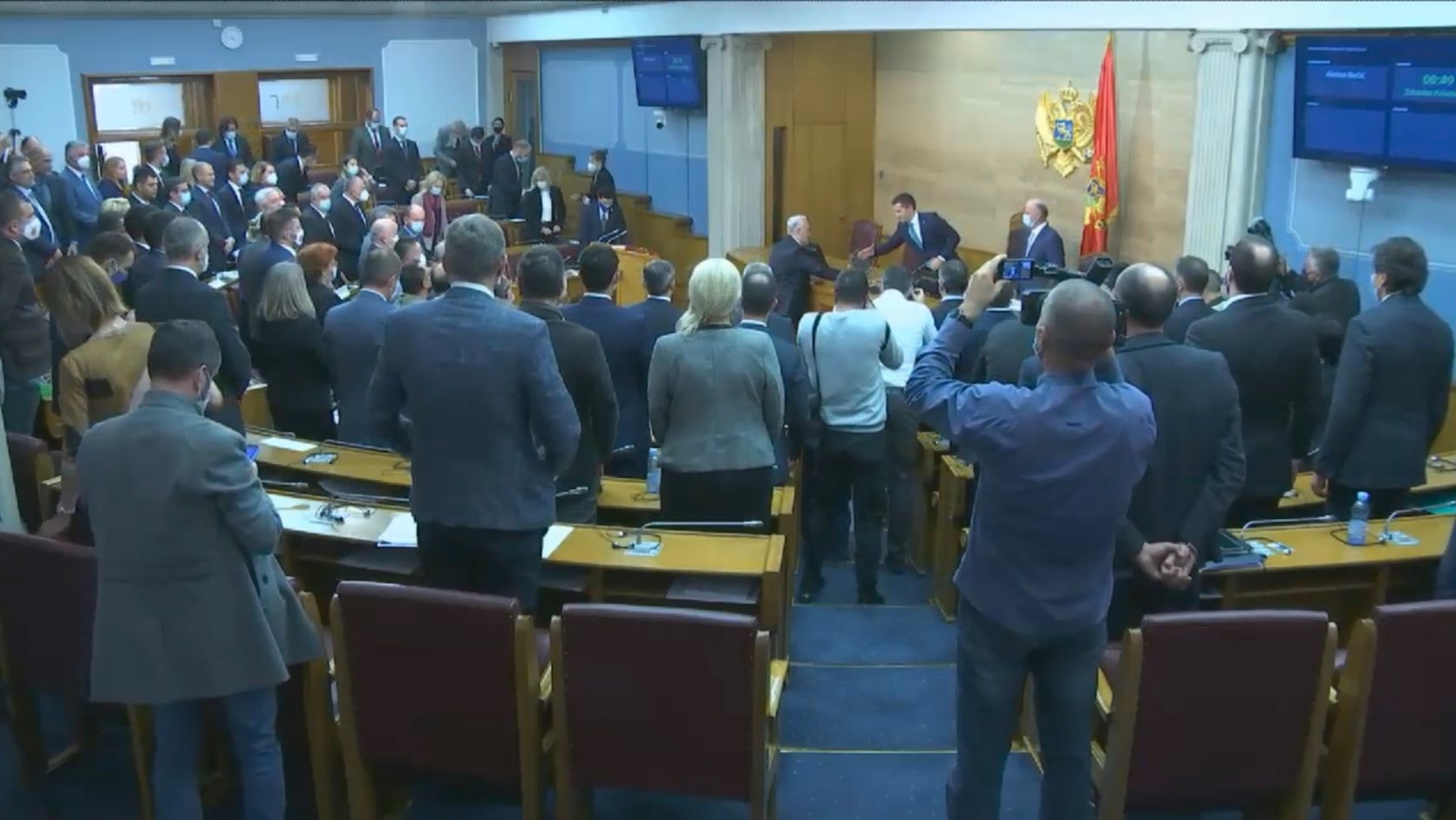
(top) PM Zdravko Krivokapić, speech in Parliament of Montenegro, 4 December 2020. (below) President of the Parliament, Aleksa Bečić congratulates the newly-elected Prime Minister of Montenegro, Zdravko Krivokapić.

On 13 November 2020, Krivokapić stated that hundreds of millions of euros were being funneled out of Montenegro into the neighboring Republic of Serbia by the outgoing Milo Đukanović DPS regime, and that the money is mostly ending up in accounts in Belgrade where they are buying villas and apartments on the luxury Belgrade Waterfront.

The parliamentary vote on the new cabinet was originally planned for 14 November, but was postponed to 24 November, by consensus of the leaders of all parties in the parliament, due to several cases of COVID-19. The session was eventually postponed again to 2 December, following subsequent insistence by several parties of the outgoing regime, which then stated that the controversial Podgorica Assembly was also held between 24 and 28 November (back then in 1918), saying the dates were "unacceptable and offensive to Montenegro", once again accusing Krivokapić and his team of allegedly activity "against the sovereignty and statehood of Montenegro". After the new postponement of the session, the President of the Parliament of Montenegro, Aleksa Bečić, reminded public that the disputed date of the session was determined by consensus of all parties, both the government and the opposition, just a day before the DPS regime initiative for new postponement. Bečić also added that between 24 and 28 November (2016), the parliament also voted for the previous government cabinet, which was led by the DPS.

Bečić and Krivokapić both accused the DPS-led outgoing regime of deceiving the citizens again and as well of undermining interethnic conflicts, in order to delay a democratic regime change in the country.

On 4 December 2020, the new government was elected by 41 out of 81 members of the Parliament of Montenegro, and Krivokapić formally became the Prime Minister of Montenegro. The parliament of Montenegro approved a new big tent cabinet, formally ending three decades of the DPS regime in the country. Prime Minister Krivokapić vowed to dismantle a state apparatus built by the DPS, and root out corruption and organised crime, as well as insisting on the establishment of ethical norms and transparency of executive and judicial authorities in the country, calling for unity, reconciliation, and solidarity.

On 15 and 16 December 2020, PM Krivokapić, together with the Minister of Defense Olivera Injac, the Minister of Economy Jakov Milatović and the Chief Negotiator with the EU, paid the first official visit to European and Euro-Atlantic institutions since taking office of PM. On the first day of his visit to Brussels, he met with the President of the European Council Charles Michel, EU Special Representative for the Western Balkans Miroslav Lajcak, and the Secretary General of NATO Jens Stoltenberg. On the second day of his visit, PM Krivokapić met with the European Commissioner for Neighbourhood and Enlargement, Olivér Várhelyi, and the Prime Minister of Belgium, Alexander De Croo.

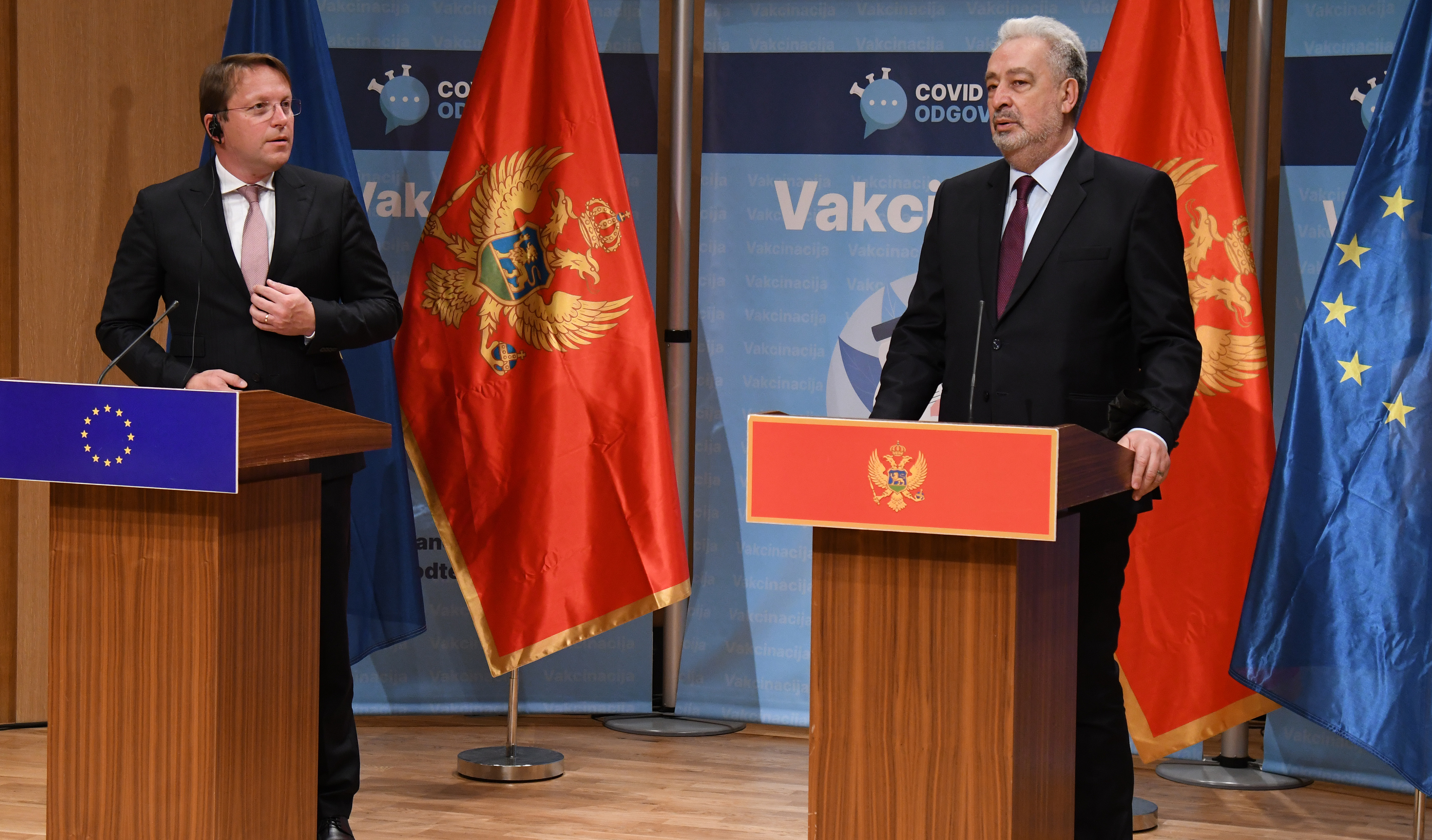
Krivokapić with European Commissioner for Neighbourhood and Enlargement Olivér Várhelyi, May 2021.

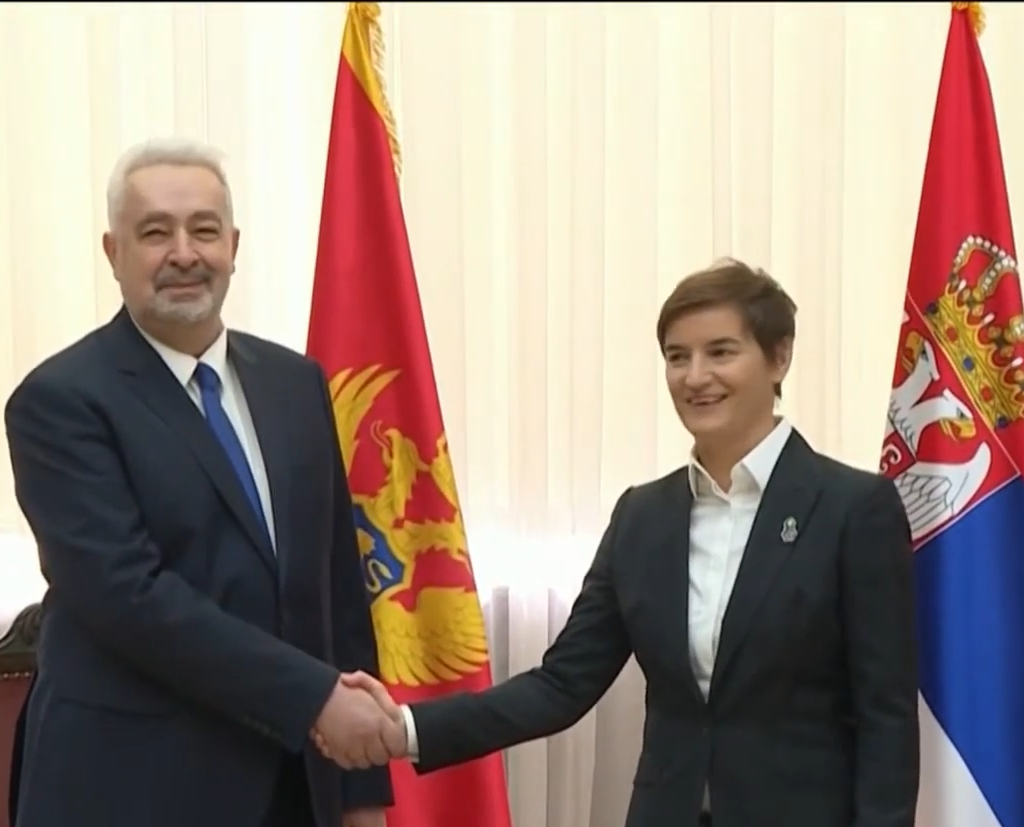
Krivokapić with Prime Minister of Serbia Ana Brnabić during his visit to Belgrade.

On 28 January 2021, Krivokapić walked through Cetinje, talked with citizens, with some Montenegrin nationalist activists yelling and insulting him and other government members calling them "Chetniks", "human garbage" and "traitors of Montenegro". Commenting on the incident at the press conference, Krivokapić said that a similar experience was experienced by former German Chancellor Kohl, when he was in Karlsruhe in 1987. "Kohl just smiled. I didn't smile, I tried to communicate with those people", said Krivokapić, also calling for dialogue and reducing polarization in Montenegrin society. The same day Krivokapić encouraged citizens of Nikšić to freely take bribe money from the DPS and then vote for someone else at the 2021 local elections, giving public support to all parties that support his government, against the DPS, and after this statement, the prosecutors have launched an investigation against him accusing him of "inciting corruption".

On 5 April 2021, Krivokapić announced that he sent a proposal for the removal of the Minister of Justice Vladimir Leposavić due to his controversial comments on the Srebrenica massacre to the Parliament of Montenegro, following the condemnation of Leposavić's comments by the US and British embassies. On the same day, protests were held in multiple cities by Montenegrin Serbs against Leposavić's removal.

However, Prime Minister Zdravko Krivokapic's government was toppled in no-confidence vote after only 14 months in power.

== Controversies and allegations ==
=== Alleged Serbian nationalism ===
On 21 September 2020, Radio Antena M internet portal published a video from the mid-1990s that has been circulating on Internet and in which Krivokapić is seen at a celebration along with Nikola Kavaja, a Serbian nationalist and anti-communist, known for his terrorist activities, as well as along the current Serbian ambassador to Montenegro Vladimir Božović and other known Serbian nationalist and Montenegrin Serb figures. Krivokapić appears in one short part of the recording, seen under the canvas, on which, among other, was a picture of Radovan Karadžić, President of Republika Srpska, who was later convicted of war crimes and genocide in Bosnia by the International Criminal Tribunal for the former Yugoslavia (ICTY) in 2016. Few days after the revelation of footage, Krivokapić told the media that he accidentally found himself at the disputed gathering in or around 1996, and that he was not an active participant of it, or advocate of nationalist politics of the 1990s, also stating that as a pacifist he condemns all kinds of terrorism and ideological extremism. He emphasized that it was the only place he entered and eventually decided that he would never enter it again expressing concern over the increased hate speech and derogatory labels by some media in Montenegro and neighboring countries.

He raised a controversy again on 13 October 2020, when in an interview he said that when it comes to relations with neighboring Serbia, the best position is that of King Nicholas I, who said that there are "two kings living in two Serb states (Kingdom of Montenegro and Kingdom of Serbia)", back then in 1910, when Montenegro was proclaimed a Kingdom.

During October 2020, another pro-DPS media published a recording of Krivokapić, that caused new controversy, in which Krivokapić is seen kissing a flag of Serbian Orthodox Church (red-blue-white tricolor with the Serbian cross), recorded during the August 2020 protests against the controversial law on religious communities, causing outrage in the Montenegrin nationalist circles and pro-DPS media, which presented it to the public as "kissing the flag of Serbia".

=== Alleged Church influence ===
Krivokapić's very close relationship with the Serbian Orthodox Church in Montenegro, as well as with its primate Amfilohije Radović, has often led to speculation, controversy and name-calling from Montenegrin nationalist and pro-DPS circles and the media. The controversy in some media culminated after the publication of the video from the election night of 30 August 2020, which shows Krivokapić's very emotional greeting in the Podgorica Cathedral with Metropolitan Amfilohije, with whom he celebrated the electoral victory of his list, and thus the withdrawal of the controversial law on religion. Krivokapić has been accused by some media and political parties, which trying to challenge his list victory at parliamentary election, of being under the influence of the church, even of being a "puppet" of anti-Montenegrin policy, and that his selection as prime minister would jeopardize national security, independence and the secular order of the state. Krivokapić dismissed all the accusations as nonsense, saying that the "question of his attitude as a believer towards a church dignitary, such as Metropolitan Amfilohije" opened a box that many want to present as the influence of the Metropolitan on his political decisions, condemning the media spin of the outgoing regime, also stating the reactions are overemphasized and unnecessary. "I felt it as my need, as a believer, i consider it as an obligation to come to see the Metropolitan, at his call. I expressed joy of moment and did not share it with anyone as with our Metropolitan", Krivokapić said in an interview for Sarajevo-based Face TV in September 2020.

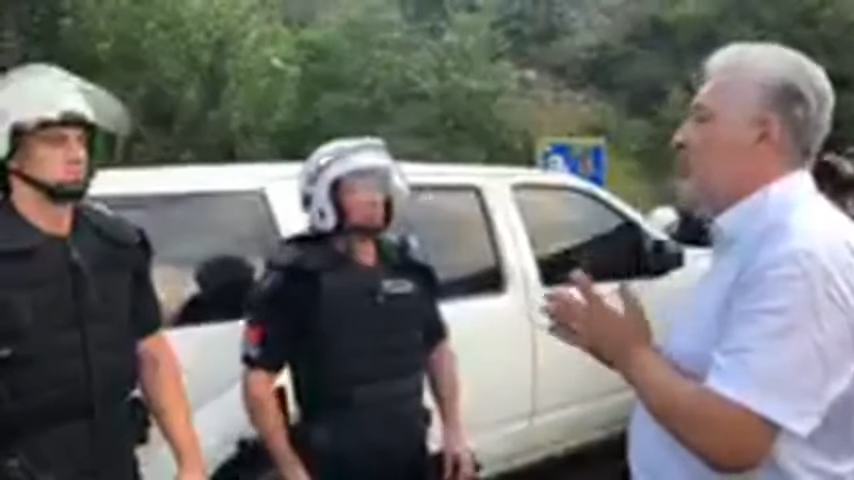
Krivokapić, then opposition list leader arguing with the Montenegrin police after they prevented an opposition convoy rally from entering Montenegrin capital Podgorica, during August 2020 parliamentary election campaign.

After the fall of the Democratic Party of Socialists populist regime from the position of power after 30 years, in the aftermath of the 2020 parliamentary election, Montenegrin nationalists (the Patriotic Association of Montenegro, among others) organized mass rallies in Cetinje and in the capital Podgorica, in support of the outgoing DPS regime, the participants and organizers of the rally accused Krivokapić and Serbian Orthodox Church in Montenegro of allegedly working against Montenegrin national interests, calling them a "threat to country independence and statehood." The rally was also marked by inappropriate messages to Krivokapić, who was labeled as "traitor", "Chetnik scoundrel" and the "hand-kisser", accusing him of allegedly being a "puppet of the alleged Serbian Orthodox Church's Greater Serbia policy". Gatherings participants's nationalist rhetoric and hate speech has been condemned by numerous media outlets, Montenegrin public figures, artists, university professors, academic and student associations, human rights activists and NGOs.

The influence of the Church on Krivokapić was also criticized by the populist and pro-Serbian Democratic Front, whose list he led at the parliamentary election. Since a political split with Krivokapić, after he questioned their competence to participate in his cabinet, in October 2020 the DF leaders began to publicly criticize the alleged influence of the Metropolitanate of Montenegro and the Littoral on Krivokapić, as well as on the new government formation. Andrija Mandić claimed that Krivokapić had been appointed leader of the electoral list after "pressure and conditioning of electoral support" by "parts of the Serbian Orthodox Church", accusing parts of the church and Krivokapić of "acting on someone's orders from abroad", while Nebojša Medojević stated that Bishop Joanikije Mićović and priest Gojko Perović set the terms of the church's support and threatened to withdraw Krivokapić from the electoral list, a few days before handing over the electoral lists for 2020 parliamentary election, which Perović categorically denied.

On 1 January 2021, Krivokapić said that the late Metropolitan Amfilohije Radović was the most influential person in Montenegro since Petar II Petrović-Njegoš.

=== COVID-19 and communion ===
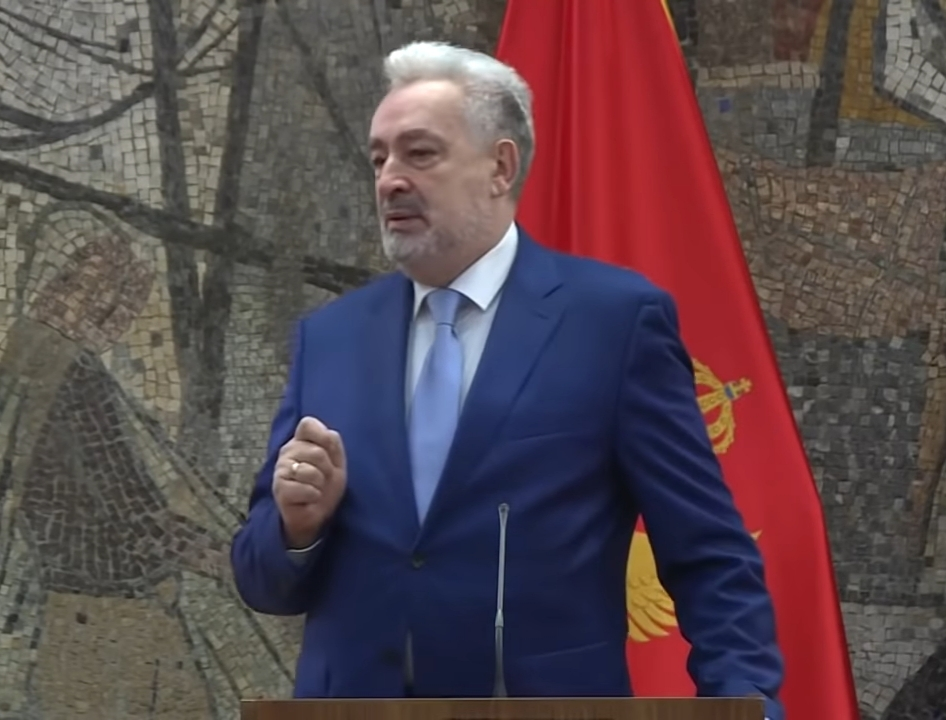
Prime Minister Krivokapić during his address to the protesting educators, Podgorica, 24 January 2021.

On 31 October 2020, a religious service at the Cetinje Monastery was held for the Metropolitan of Montenegro and the Littoral Amfilohije Radović who died a day earlier. Krivokapić attended the service and was filmed receiving communion with the same spoon as the believers before him violating the COVID-19 safety measures.

On the same day, the outgoing Democratic Party of Socialists regime announced the accusation of Krivokapić not to act as a representative of all citizens, but as a "propagandist of the interests of one religious community", as well as for "irresponsible behavior" during "events that could be risky for citizens' health". As they said, "it is worrying that the prime minister-designate, as an active participant in these events, does not recognize the moment that with his examples and public appeal, he influences the citizens' awareness of the dangers of such behavior".

On 13 November 2020, Krivokapić made a controversial statement regarding a communion when he said that "if you have faith, you don't have any problems, you won't get infected through communion". "It is the right of every believer to profess his religion in the manner prescribed by the religious community to which he belongs," Krivokapić said, also urging citizens to respect the government regulations that apply due to the coronavirus pandemic. Krivokapić also stated that corruption within the Montenegro's health system has contributed to the increase in fatalities during a pandemic much more than the maintaining of religious rites caused that, "We need to help health system of the country, which is one of the weakest in Europe due to the corruption of the DPS-led regime. Therefore, one of the priorities of the future government will be the modernization of the health sector", stated Krivokapić on his official Twitter account on 14 November.

On 13 November 2020, Krivokapić announced that he allegedly beat COVID-19 without even knowing that he had it.

=== Victory Day statement ===
Krivokapić assessed that "Montenegro should no longer celebrate May 9 Victory Day over fascism, but 23 September", when the new convocation of the Parliament was constituted, in which the opposition coalition has gained parliamentary majority, noting historical significance of "the first democratic regime change in history of Montenegro", after the August 2020 parliamentary election. Many saw this statement as him belittling the anti-fascist movement in Montenegro.

== Personal life ==
With his wife Jasminka, Krivokapić has five children (2 daughters and 3 sons) and three grandchildren. Three children have a master's degree, and the eldest daughter has a doctorate. Of the two youngest sons, one is a student and the other a high school student. The Rector of the Theological Seminary in Cetinje, Gojko Perović called Krivokapić a humble man, and a Christian in the best sense of the word. He also added that Krivokapić was donating money that was paid to him every month for transporting the poorest students at the seminary. Krivokapić said that he is a Montenegrin but that he knows his roots, declaring himself as a Montenegrin-Serb. He has also stated that ethnic Serbs in Montenegro are not related to the territory of present-day Serbia by their ancestry, but represent the autochthonous people of Montenegro. He refers to Montenegrin Serbs and ethnic Montenegrins as one and the same people, often pointing out that the divisions between the two Montenegrin peoples have been imposed and highly politicized during recent historical circumstances. By ancestry, he is a member of the Cuce clan of Old Montenegro. Krivokapić voted against the independence of Montenegro at the 2006 referendum, by voting to remain in a state union with Serbia.
