= Maksim Vučinić =

Montenegrin politician

Maksim Vučinić Максим Вучинић

Member of Parliament
- Incumbent
- Assumed office 23 September 2020
- President: Aleksa Bečić

Personal details
- Born: 11 July 1994 (age 32) Nikšić, FR Yugoslavia (now Montenegro)
- Party: New Serb Democracy (2025–present); Workers' Party (2015–2025); New Serb Democracy (before 2015)
- Parent: Janko Vučinić (father)
- Education: University of Montenegro
- Profession: Electrical engineer, politician

Maksim Vučinić (Serbian Cyrillic: Максим Вучинић; born 11 July 1994) is a Montenegrin electrical engineer and politician, who is currently a Member of the Parliament of Montenegro, where he chairs the Parliamentary Commission for Monitoring the Privatisation Process. He was the president of the minor left-populist and socially conservative Workers' Party, since 2019, when he succeeded his father Janko Vučinić at its helm until its dissolution in 2025.

== Biography ==
=== Early life and entering politics ===
After graduating from the Faculty of Electrical Engineering at the University of Montenegro, he decided to enter politics in the mid-2010s, joining the right-wing New Serb Democracy (NSD) and the opposition Democratic Front (DF) alliance, in which he served as a member of local board in his hometown Nikšić.

At that time, his father Janko Vučinić was an independent MP within the parliamentary club of the DF. In 2015, Janko Vučinić founded the socialist and left-populist Workers' Party (RP), continuing his activity within a coalition with the DF. In March 2019, Workers' Party left the coalition with Democratic Front.

=== Leader of the Workers' Party ===
In December 2019 he succeeded his father as the president of the Worker's Party, after his sudden death in October. After he took the lead in the RP, the party increasingly employed a more significant cultural and socially conservative discourse, supporting 2019-2020 Clerical protests in Montenegro and Serbian Orthodox Church rights in Montenegro, due to the 2020 Montenegrin political crisis, and an open conflict between the Serbian Orthodox Church in Montenegro and the DPS-led Government of Montenegro, following the adoption of the disputed law on the status of religious communities in the country. Vučinič claims that if workers in the private sector are exposed to exploitation and exploitation to the maximum of psychophysical possibilities, no less exposed to pressure are also workers in the public sector, by "party soldiers". He also criticized Montenegrin government for legalizing same-sex civil partnerships by saying that this decision is a continuation of the "path of hell". His party will participate in the 2020 Montenegrin Parliamentary elections as a part of the Democratic Front-led For the Future of Montenegro coalition, Maksim Vučinić hold the twenty-seventh place on common electoral list. Vučinić was elected to Parliament after For the Future of Montenegro gained 27 seats. As the youngest MP, he was assisting Miodrag Lekić, the oldest member of parliament who acts as the speaker for the first session of the parliament.

In September 2023, he was appointed president of the board of directors of EPCG Željezara Nikšić.

=== Member of New Serb Democracy ===
On November 4th 2025 Maksim Vučinić dissolved the Workers Party to join New Serb Democracy along with the rest of party membership.
