= For the Future of Montenegro =

Political party in Montenegro

For the Future of Montenegro За будућност Црне Горе Za budućnost Crne Gore
- Leader: Zdravko Krivokapić (2020–2021); Collective leadership (2021–2023); Milan Knežević (2023– )
- Founded: 2 August 2020
- Headquarters: Podgorica
- Ideology: Cultural conservatism; Serb ethnic interests; Anti-corruption; Soft Russophilia; Factions: Christian democracy; Social conservatism; National conservatism; Right-wing populism; Social democracy
- Political position: Right-wing
- Slogan: Truth. Justice. Finally!
- Parliament: 13 / 81
- Mayors: 4 / 25
- Local Parliaments: 114 / 844

Party flag
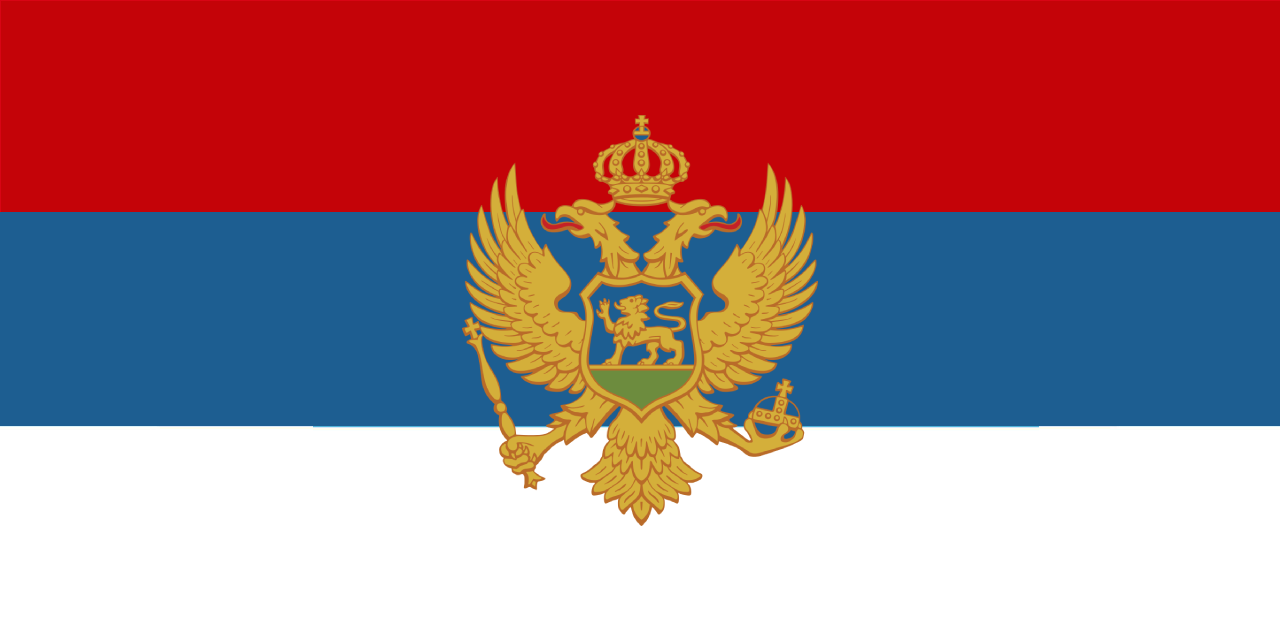

Website
- www.zabuducnost.me

For the Future of Montenegro (Serbian: За будућност Црне Горе, romanized: Za budućnost Crne Gore, ZBCG) is a mainly cultural conservative and Serb political coalition in Montenegro, formed for the 2020 and 2023 parliamentary elections. It has been described as a grouping that is "pro-Serbian". The coalition common list for 2020 election was led by a Montenegrin university professor, Zdravko Krivokapić. The leader of the list in 2023 is Milan Knežević.

Coalition constituent members for 2020 parliamentary election are; two alliances Democratic Front (New Serb Democracy, Movement for Changes, Democratic People's Party and True Montenegro), Popular Movement (United Montenegro, Workers' Party, independent group in the parliament, also some minor right-wing parties, such as DSJ and DSS), NGO NDCG and Socialist People's Party, which is not part of any of alliances, but maintains close cooperation with the newly-formed Popular Movement. The coalition is also supported by a number of minor non-parliamentary organizations such as far-right Serb Radical Party of Montenegro, as well as far-left Yugoslav Communist Party, also of some Serb national and cultural NGOs in Montenegro, such as Serb National Council of Montenegro.

Andrija Mandić used the name of the coalition for his 2023 presidential campaign. The coalition was revived ahead of the 2023 parliamentary election, but without the Movement for Changes, Socialist People's Party, Ne damo Crnu Goru and True Montenegro.

== History ==
Former logo

=== 2020 election campaign ===
The coalition was formed in August 2020, and was initially composed of two alliances Democratic Front, Popular Movement and Socialist People's Party, which is not part of any alliances. The main goal of the coalition is to overthrow the ruling Democratic Party of Socialists (DPS) of President Milo Đukanović, which has been in power since its founding in 1991. All coalition member parties employed a more significant cultural and socially conservative discourse, due to 2020 Montenegrin political crisis and the open conflict between the Serbian Orthodox Church and the DPS-led Montenegrin government, following the adoption of the disputed law on the status of religious communities in Montenegro, supporting 2019–2020 clerical protests in Montenegro and Serbian Orthodox Church rights in Montenegro. Many media, analysts, but also political opponents have labeled the new coalition as the "Vučić's list", because major parties in the new coalition have very close cooperation with the populist SNS-led regime in Serbia, the largest number of constituents of the new coalition were present at several meetings in Belgrade during 2019 and 2020, organized by Serbian President (also the SNS chairman) Aleksandar Vučić, gathering "leaders of Serb communities" in Serbia's neighboring countries.

=== New parliamentary majority ===
30 August 2020 election resulted in a victory for the opposition parties and the fall from power of the ruling DPS, which has ruled the country since the introduction of the multi-party system in 1990. Shortly after the polls were closed, before the final results were published, coalition leader Krivokapić announced the coalition's victory stating that "freedom has happened in Montenegro". In his speech he also stated that there won't be revanchism and he also offered ethnic minority parties to enter the new government. The coalition won 32.55% of the popular vote which equals 27 seats in the parliament. Krivokapić and the leaders of the coalitions Peace is Our Nation and In Black and White, Aleksa Bečić and Dritan Abazović, agreed during meeting on several principles on which the future government will rest, including the formation of an expert government, to continue to work on the European Union accession process, fight against corruption, overcoming society polarization, and to work on changing the disputed Law on Religious Communities. They also welcomed minority parties of Bosniaks and Albanians of Montenegro, and wished to form government with them. The coalition also won additional 13 seats in the municipal elections held in Andrijevica, Budva, Gusinje, Kotor and Tivat.

=== Dissolution and aftermath ===
The Coalition eventually dissolved prior to the assembly of the new parliament in October 2020, when all the constituent members formed separate parliamentary groups. Minor United Montenegro and Workers' Party left the Popular Movement of Daka Davidović, joining Democratic Front (DF), while the Movement for Changes (5 MPs) decided to leave DF parliamentary group, returning to its pro-western roots, forming its independent parliamentary group, as earlier did the Socialist People's Party with 5 MPs, leaving the Democratic Front parliamentary group with 17 representatives.

Since a political split with their candidate for PM, Zdravko Krivokapić, after he questioned their competence to participate in his cabinet, leaders of the Democratic Front, Andrija Mandić, Milan Knežević and Nebojša Medojević started to publicly criticize the alleged influence of the Serbian Orthodox Church, as well of the businessman Daka Davidović on Krivokapić decisions and on composition of his cabinet, which they eventually supported in parliament after all. Mandić claimed that Krivokapić had been appointed head of the "For the Future" list after "pressure and conditioning of electoral support" by "parts of the Serbian Orthodox Church", accusing parts of the church and Krivokapić of "acting on someone's orders from abroad", while Medojević stated that Bishop Joanikije Mićović and priest Gojko Perović set the terms of the church's support and threatened to withdraw Krivokapić from the electoral list, a few days before handing over the electoral lists for 2020 parliamentary election, which Perović categorically denied. During October and November Medojević and Mandić have repeatedly conditioned their parties' support for the Krivokapić Cabinet, if they were not part of it. Mandić explicitly asked Krivokapić to "return the mandate and that they would look for a new PM designate". Unfoundedly accusing and public insults were publicly condemned by the Serbian Church, PM Krivokapić, Davidović, but also by the DF's coalition partner the Socialist People's Party, while the True Montenegro of Marko Milačić decided to left the Democratic Front parliamentary group, out the protest.

Since early 2021, despite the fact he's still an independent politician, many media outlets and opposition subjects, as well some parties in the parliamentary majority accused PM Krivokapić and Ne damo Crnu Goru movement of being affiliated and working in close relations with the centrist Democrats-led Peace is Our Nation alliance, which Krivokapić himself has repeatedly denied. Eventually, the local branches of the organization participated in the 2021 municipal-level elections, in Nikšić and Herceg Novi, as part of the coalition gathered around the Democrats, while, Socialist People's Party decided to rejoin coalition with the Democratic Front in order to participate at the local elections. Ever since the constitution of Krivokapić's cabinet in December 2021, the Democratic Front launched a negative campaign and open public pressure, with frequent demands on PM Krivokapić to choose his cabinet reshuffle with their leaders within, or to resign from the post, supported by populist SNS regime in Serbia, as well SNS-controlled media and affiliated political outlets in Serbia and Montenegro, and besides, DF continued providing its limited parliamentary support to Krivokapić and his cabinet. Prime Minister Zdravko Krivokapic's government was toppled in no-confidence vote after only 14 months in power.

=== 2023 elections ===
The alliance reformed ahead of the 2023 presidential and parliamentary elections, with NSD, DNP, and RP. Andrija Mandić was the coalition's candidate in the first round, who eventually came in third place. The alliance endorsed Europe Now! candidate and eventual winner Jakov Milatović for the second round. In the 2023 parliamentary elections, the alliance came in third place, winning 13 seats in total.

== Electoral performance ==
=== Presidential elections ===
Election	Candidate	1st round		2nd round		Result
Election	Candidate	Votes	%	Votes	%	Result
2023	Andrija Mandić	65,394	19.32%	—N/a		Lost ✗

=== Parliamentary elections ===
Election	Coalition leader	Performance				Rank	Government
Election	Coalition leader	Votes	%	Seats	+/–	Rank	Government
2020	Zdravko Krivokapić	133,261	32.55%	27 / 81	New	2nd	Support 2020–22
2020	Zdravko Krivokapić	133,261	32.55%	27 / 81	New	2nd	Opposition 2022–23
2023	Milan Knežević	44,565	14.74%	13 / 81	▼14	3rd	Support 2023–24
2023	Milan Knežević	44,565	14.74%	13 / 81	▼14	3rd	Government 2024–

== Member parties ==
Party		Ideology	Leader	Since	No. of seats
New Serb Democracy; Nova srpska demokratija Нова српска демократија	NSD	National conservatism Serbian nationalism	Andrija Mandić	2020–	9 / 81
Democratic People's Party; Demokratska narodna partija Демократска народна партија	DNP	Social conservatism Populism; Russophilia	Milan Knežević	2020–	4 / 81

=== Former members ===
Party	Abbreviation	Ideology	Leader	Member
Movement for Changes; Pokret za promjene Покрет за промјене	PzP	Right-wing populism Conspiracy theorism Euroscepticism	Nebojša Medojević	2020–2023
Socialist People's Party; Socijalistička narodna partija Социјалистичка народна партија	SNP	Social conservatism Social democracy Pro-Europeanism	Vladimir Joković	2020–2022
True Montenegro^{[a]} Prava Crna Gora; Права Црна Гора	Prava	Right-wing populism Military neutrality	Marko Milačić	2020–2021
United Montenegro^{[a]} Ujedinjena Crna Gora; Уједињена Црна Гора	UCG	Conservatism; Pro-Europeanism; Unionism	Vladimir Dobričanin	2020–2022
Free Montenegro^{[b]} Slobodna Crna Gora; Слободна Црнa Горa	SCG	Right-wing populism Social conservatism Serbian nationalism	Vladislav Dajković	2021–2022

^{a} Members of the Democratic Front's parliamentary group only. ^{b} Regional-level partner parties

== Parliamentary seats (2020) ==
Elected MPs from the list at the parliamentary elections in August 2020. ^{a} List's ballot carrier Krivokapić (NDCG) handed over his parliamentary seat to a representative of the New Serb Democracy, after his election for Prime Minister in December 2020.

Name	Ideology	Position	Leader	MPs
New Serb Democracy (Note: Member of the Democratic Front alliance); Nova srpska demokratija Нова српска демократија	National conservatism Serbian-Montenegrin unionism Russophilia	Right-wing	Andrija Mandić	9 / 81
Movement for Changes; Pokret za promjene Покрет за промјене	Populism; Souverainism; Anti-corruption	Right-wing	Nebojša Medojević	5 / 81
Democratic People's Party; Demokratska narodna partija Демократска народна партија	Populism; Serbian–Montenegrin unionism Social conservatism	Right-wing	Milan Knežević	5 / 81
Socialist People's Party; Socijalistička narodna partija Социјалистичка народна партија	Social conservatism Social democracy Pro-Europeanism	Syncretic	Vladimir Joković	5 / 81
True Montenegro; Prava Crna Gora; Права Црна Гора	Right-wing populism Social conservatism Serbian-Montenegrin unionism	Right-wing	Marko Milačić	1 / 81
United Montenegro (Note: Member of the Popular Movement alliance); Ujedinjena Crna Gora; Уједињена Црна Гора	Cultural conservatism National conservatism Pro-Europeanism	Centre-right	Goran Danilović	1 / 81
Workers' Party; Radnička partija Радничка партија	Social conservatism Left-wing populism Cultural conservatism	Syncretic	Maksim Vučinić	1 / 81

== Parliamentary seats (2023) ==
Elected MPs from the list at the parliamentary elections in June 2023.

Name	Ideology	Position	Leader	MPs
New Serb Democracy (Note: Member of the Democratic Front alliance) Nova srpska demokratija Нова српска демократија	National conservatism Serbian-Montenegrin unionism Russophilia	Right-wing	Andrija Mandić	9 / 81
Democratic People's Party; Demokratska narodna partija Демократска народна партија	Populism; Serbian–Montenegrin unionism Social conservatism	Right-wing	Milan Knežević	4 / 81
Workers' Party (Note: Member of the Popular Movement alliance); Radnička partija Радничка партија	Social conservatism Left-wing populism Cultural conservatism	Syncretic	Maksim Vučinić	0 / 81
Serbian Radical Party^{[b]} Srpska radikalna stranka Српска радикална странка	Serbian ultranationalism Russophilia	Far-right	Ilija Darmanović	0 / 81
