= Janko Vučinić =

Montenegrin MP and boxer (1966–2019)

- Јанко Вучинић

Member of Parliament
- In office 14 October 2012 – 25 October 2019

Personal details
- Born: 13 May 1966 Nikšić, SR Montenegro, SFR Yugoslavia
- Died: 25 October 2019 (aged 53) Nikšić, Montenegro
- Party: Workers' Party
- Children: Maksim Vučinić
- Education: Veljko Vlahović University
- Profession: Union leader, politician

Janko Vučinić (Serbian Cyrillic: Јанко Вучинић; 13 May 1966 – 25 October 2019) was a Montenegrin professional boxer, union leader and politician, member of the Parliament of Montenegro. He was the president of the Workers' Party (RP), a constituent member of the opposition political alliance Democratic Front parliamentary club in the Parliament of Montenegro.

== Early life and career. ==
Janko Vučinić was born in 1966 in Nikšić, Socialist Republic of Montenegro, Socialist Federal Republic of Yugoslavia. He graduated at the Metallurgic-Technical Faculty at the Veljko Vlahović University in Titograd in 1991. After finishing his studies, he worked in Željezara in Nikšić. He was the President of the Union Organization of Željezara from 2004.

== Political life ==
From 2008 to his political engagement in the Democratic Front he was the President of the Central Committee of the Union of Free Trade Unions of Montenegro. Until entering the Democratic Front electoral list in 2012, he was not a member of any political party. On 3 March 2015 Vučinić announced the formation of a new left-wing Workers' Party. Since its foundation, RP is a constituent member of the opposition Democratic Front (DF) alliance. In March 2019, the Workers' Party left the coalition with Democratic Front. After his death in October 2019, his son Maksim, succeeded him as the president of the party.
