= United Montenegro =

Montenegrin political party

United Montenegro Ujedinjena Crna Gora Уjедињена Црна Гора
- Leader: Goran Danilović
- President: Vladimir Dobričanin
- Founded: 13 September 2017
- Split from: Demos
- Headquarters: Podgorica
- Ideology: Serbian nationalism Social conservatism
- Political position: Right-wing
- National affiliation: For the Benefit of All (2019–2020); Popular Movement (2020); For the Future of Montenegro (2020–2021)
- Serbian affiliation: Serbian Progressive Party
- Parliament: 1 / 81
- Mayors: 0 / 25
- Local Parliaments: 11 / 844

Website
- Facebook page

United Montenegro (Serbian: Уједињена Црна Гора / Ujedinjena Crna Gora, UCG) is a conservative political party in Montenegro. Party founder and de facto political leader is Goran Danilović, former Minister of Interior Affairs in Government of Montenegro.

== History ==
The United Montenegro was founded in September 2017 when the conservative faction of Democratic Alliance (DEMOS) led by party vice-president Goran Danilović split and formed a new political party due to disagreements with party leader Miodrag Lekić.

On 1 May 2019, the United Montenegro decided to sign an agreement with Socialist People's Party (SNP), Workers' Party (RP) and Independent parliamentary group to form a new catch-all political alliance under the name For the Benefit of All (Da svako ima).

The alliance eventually dissolved prior the parliamentary election in August 2020. In July 2020 United Montenegro, jointly with the Workers' Party and Independent group in the parliament (composed of former members of SNP and DEMOS parties), agreed to form a new cultural conservative political alliance under the name Popular Movement (NP), employing a more significant cultural and socially conservative discourse, supporting 2019-2020 clerical protests in Montenegro and Serbian Orthodox Church rights in Montenegro, continuing its activity within the joint electoral list with Democratic Front and the SNP.

== Electoral performance ==
=== Presidential elections ===
Election	Candidate	1st round		2nd round		Result
Election	Candidate	Votes	%	Votes	%	Result
2018 (Note: Supported Mladen Bojanić as independent candidate.)	Mladen Bojanić	111,711	33.40	—		Lost ✗
2023	Goran Danilović	4,659	1.38	—		Lost ✗

=== Parliamentary elections ===
Election	Party leader	Performance				Alliance	Government
Election	Party leader	Votes	%	Seats	+/–	Alliance	Government
2020	Goran Danilović	133,261	32.55%	1 / 81	New	with ZBCG	Support 2020–22
2020	Goran Danilović	133,261	32.55%	1 / 81	New	with ZBCG	Opposition 2022–23
2023	Goran Danilović	77,203	25.53%	1 / 81	Steady	PES-UCG-Civis	Support
