= Prime minister–designate =

Person expected to succeed an incumbent as prime minister

A prime minister–designate or premier-designate is the person who is expected to succeed an incumbent as prime minister, or premier, as the result of a general election, winning the leadership of a currently governing party, or being named by the head of state to form a new government.

== Overview ==
In the Westminster system, which originated in what is now the United Kingdom, the head of state or their representative has the sole prerogative to appoint a new prime minister upon the resignation, dismissal or death of the incumbent prime minister. Invariably, sitting prime ministers who after an election have no reasonable hope of commanding the confidence of parliament will resign rather than face a certain vote of no confidence. If another party has won a majority government, the prime minister will formally advise the appointment of that party's leader as the new prime minister. There is usually no set minimum or maximum amount of time set aside for the transition to take place, but often in countries that have adopted the Westminster system the incoming head of government will want two or three weeks to put affairs in order and determine who should get cabinet posts, which itself might require more time especially if recounts involving prospective frontbenchers are in progress. As such, the incoming head of government will spend two or three weeks as prime minister–designate before being formally sworn in as prime minister. This is not the case in the United Kingdom itself however, where an opposition leader who wins a clear majority in a general election is expected to assume office as soon as possible, often within 24 hours after the polls close.

The situation is more complicated in the case of a hung parliament. By law, incumbent prime ministers always have the right to try to win the confidence of the house in a confidence vote. Often, especially if they do not have the most seats, prime ministers will not attempt to remain in office and will instead relinquish power in favour of the leader of the largest party, in which case they become prime minister–designate same as if their party had a majority. On the other hand, if a prime minister in such a situation chooses not to resign, the leader of the largest opposition party will not become the prime minister–designate even if their party has the most seats. In the latter case, the prime minister must win a vote of confidence to remain in office. If they are immediately defeated in the house, the head of state (or representative thereof) in most Westminster systems has the de facto prerogative to refuse a request to dissolve the house. The leader of the largest opposition party therefore could still become prime minister–designate perhaps several weeks after the general election.

The term prime minister–elect is sometimes used as a synonym but in most circumstances is technically incorrect: a prime minister is usually appointed by the head of state, and not elected to office by the entire nation, as is the case with some presidential polls; however, it has nonetheless seen common use in the media. Terms such as incoming prime minister and prime minister–in-waiting are also sometimes used, although the latter term is also sometimes used prior to an election for a party leader who is leading in the polls and/or has a meaningful chance of winning, or even more generally at any time between elections in reference to any opposition party leader (regardless of his or her party's perceived electoral prospects) and even for future leadership contenders within the current governing party. Under the broader definition, many prime ministers-in-waiting never actually become prime ministers. In some countries, the role is specifically covered by legislation, in others, convention applies before the chosen leader is sworn in. The Australian Electoral Commission, the government authority responsible for the conduct of elections in Australia, notes that "it is usually possible for the prime minister–elect to claim victory on the night of the election".

The media sometimes prematurely refers to someone as a prime minister–designate where the broader term of prime minister-in-waiting would be more suitable. Common circumstances when this happens include upcoming leadership elections where there is only one candidate and/or a clear majority of eligible voters in the election have pledged to vote for a particular candidate. For example, in the United Kingdom during the 2007 Labour Party leadership election, Gordon Brown was referred to as the prime minister–designate even before the leadership elections had confirmed him in that position. Some reporters have suggested that in such circumstances, the term prime minister–presumptive would be more suitable than either "in-waiting" or "designate" since the prospects of accession are typically similar to that of an heir presumptive in a monarchy or a presumptive nominee in a United States presidential election. In the Republic of Ireland, where the prime minister and head of government are officially titled and referred to in both English and Irish as the Taoiseach, the person most expected to succeed to the office is variously described as the presumptive Taoiseach, the Taoiseach-designate, the Taoiseach-in-waiting or more rarely the Taoiseach-elect, with no singular style predominating.

In continental European Parliamentary systems, which frequently use proportional representation for elections to parliament, and have a multiparty system that makes it improbable for one party to win an outright majority, there is usually no prime minister–designate apparent right after the election. Rather, the outgoing caretaker government continues to serve in a lame duck capacity, while the head of state consults with representatives of the parties represented in the new parliament, and designates a formateur to form a majority coalition. The formateur only becomes prime minister–designate once the coalition formation is finalized; in turn, the prime minister–designate only becomes prime minister after receiving a formal vote of confidence from the newly-elected parliament.

Even in situations where the election results do yield a clear prime minister–designate, constitutional European parliamentary systems rely more on codified rules, in contrast to the unwritten basis of their Westminster counterparts. As a result, the mandates of the government and parliament are legally tied; therefore, the formation of the new government can only take place after the inauguration of the new parliament, which results in a lame duck period. For example, following the Tisza Party's landslide victory in the 2026 Hungarian parliamentary election, Tisza's leader, Péter Magyar, did not become prime minister on election day, but assumed office only after the new parliament met for the first time on May 9 and elected him to the role. The title "premier-designate" often has the same meaning in governments that use the title "premier" to describe a role equivalent to a prime minister.

== Constitutionally specified roles ==
In most jurisdictions where the term is used, becoming prime minister–designate grants no special powers, duties or privileges until an appointment to the office is made.

=== Israel ===
Between 1996 and 2001 (when direct prime-ministerial elections were held), the role and duration of the prime minister–elect were prescribed by Israeli legislation: within 45 days of the publication of the election results (which were published eight days after elections) the prime minister–elect would have appeared before the Knesset, presented the ministers of the government, announced the division of tasks and the guiding principles of the government's policies, and, after receiving a vote of confidence, enter into office; failure to receive a vote of confidence would have resulted in a new election for prime minister. In 2001, the Knesset voted to change the system of direct prime-ministerial elections and restore the one-vote parliamentary system of government that operated until 1996, approving a reformed version of the original Basic Law: The Government 1968. This new law entered into effect with the January 2003 elections.

=== Solomon Islands ===
The Solomon Islands' constitution provides fourteen days between the date of the general election and the selection of the prime minister. During this period, aspiring candidates for prime minister lobby intensely to acquire the numbers needed to win the contest and form the government. The individual successfully voted to form a government is the prime minister–designate until sworn in by the governor-general.

== See also ==
- -elect
- Caretaker government of Australia
- President-elect of the United States
