= Workers' Party (Montenegro) =

Montenegrin political party

Workers' Party Radnička partija Радничка партија
- President: Maksim Vučinić
- Founder: Janko Vučinić
- Founded: 3 March 2015
- Dissolved: 4 November 2025
- Merged into: New Serb Democracy
- Headquarters: Nikšić
- Ideology: Labourism; Social conservatism Syndicalism
- Political position: Left-wing
- National affiliation: For the Benefit of All (2019–2020); For the Future of Montenegro (2020–2025)
- Parliament: 0 / 81
- Mayors: 0 / 25
- Local Parliaments: 0 / 844

Website
- www.radnickapartija.me

The Workers' Party or Labour Party (Serbian: Радничка партија / Radnička partija, RP) was a minor Montenegrin political party which was part of the right-wing Democratic Front.

== History ==
The party was established on 3 March 2015 by Janko Vučinić, former union leader. Since its foundation until 2019, RP was a constituent member of the opposition populist Democratic Front (DF) alliance. In March 2019, the Workers' Party left the coalition with Democratic Front.

On 1 May 2019, the Workers' Party decided to sign an agreement with Socialist People's Party (SNP), United Montenegro (UCG) and Independent parliamentary group to form a big tent political alliance under the name For the Benefit of All.

Party leader Vučinić died on October 25, 2019. On November 7, the party announced that party vice-president Željka Savković would replace Vučinić as new party member of Parliament of Montenegro. On December 9, the Workers' Party elected Vučinić's son Maksim Vučinić, an electrical engineer, for the new Party president.

DSI eventually dissolved prior the parliamentary election in August 2020. In July 2020 United Montenegro, jointly with the Workers' Party and Independent group in the parliament (composed of former members of SNP and DEMOS parties), agreed to form a new cultural conservative political alliance under the name Popular Movement (NP), employing a more significant cultural and socially conservative discourse, supporting 2019-2020 clerical protests in Montenegro and Serbian Orthodox Church rights in Montenegro, continuing its activity within the joint electoral list with Democratic Front and the SNP.

On November 4, 2025, the party was dissolved as all of its members, including Vučinić, had joined the New Serb Democracy.

== Electoral performance ==
=== Parliamentary elections ===
Election	Party leader	Performance				Alliance	Government
Election	Party leader	Votes	%	Seats	+/–	Alliance	Government
2012	Janko Vučinić	82,773	22.82%	1 / 81	New	DF	Opposition
2016	Janko Vučinić	77,784	20.32%	1 / 81	— 0	DF	Opposition
2020	Maksim Vučinić	133,261	32.55%	1 / 81	— 0	with ZBCG	Support 2020–22
2020	Maksim Vučinić	133,261	32.55%	1 / 81	— 0	with ZBCG	Opposition 2022–23
2023	Maksim Vučinić	44,565	14.74%	0 / 81	▼1	ZBCG	Extra-parliamentary
