= Democratic Front (Montenegro) =

Montenegrin political alliance

Democratic Front Демократски фронт Demokratski front
- Leader: Collective leadership
- Founders: Miodrag Lekić; Andrija Mandić; Nebojša Medojević
- Founded: 24 July 2012
- Dissolved: 14 May 2023
- Succeeded by: For the Future of Montenegro (partly)
- Headquarters: Podgorica
- Ideology: Serbian nationalism Social conservatism Right-wing populism Russophilia; Initially (2012–2015): Catch-all alliance Liberal conservatism Pro-Europeanism
- Political position: Right-wing (Except Radnička Partija)
- Slogan: Us or him

Party flag

Website
- www.demokratskifront.me

The Democratic Front (Serbo-Croatian: Демократски фронт / Demokratski front, DF) was a right-wing populist and socially conservative political alliance in Montenegro. It was composed of the New Serb Democracy, Movement for Changes and Democratic People's Party, with some other minor parties as the alliance's partners at the local level, while United Montenegro and Workers' Party were external members of the Democratic Front parliamentary group. The alliance was formed mainly to oust the Democratic Party of Socialists, the party in power from the introduction of the multi-party system until the 2020 parliamentary election.

== History ==
=== Catch-all alliance (2012–2015) ===
Miodrag Lekić led the alliance's list in the parliamentary election of October 2012. Lekić ran in the 2013 presidential election, supported by both his Democratic Front and the Socialist People's Party. According to the electoral committee's report, he was narrowly defeated by incumbent Filip Vujanović of the ruling DPS. However, many independent observers insisted that Vujanović's victory came about as the result of a massive electoral fraud.

In March 2015, Lekić split from the alliance due to internal disagreements, having decided to form a new centre-right, moderate and pro-EU political party, DEMOS.

=== Shift to the right (2015–present) ===
After Lekić departed from the alliance, the Democratic Front significantly changed its public appearance and its rhetoric and ideology became more radicalized. At the 2016 parliamentary election, DF came second, behind ruling DPS, with 20.32% of the vote with 18 seats won, remaining in opposition. On 9 May 2019, members of alliance leadership Andrija Mandić and Milan Knežević, along with 12 another people found guilty by the Higher Court in Montenegro for the "plotting to commit terrorist acts and undermine the constitutional order of Montenegro on the day of 2016 parliamentary election."

==== 2020 parliamentary election ====
On 3 August 2020, the Democratic Front alliance decided to sign an agreement with the Socialist People's Party, United Montenegro, Workers' Party, as well some minor extra-parliamentary parties, forming a pre-election coalition under the name For the Future of Montenegro, in order to participate at the forthcoming 30 August 2020 elections. The coalition common list for 2020 election is led by a Montenegrin university professor, Zdravko Krivokapić. Many media, analysts, but also political opponents have labeled the new coalition as the "Vučić's list", because major parties in the new coalition have very close cooperation with the populist SNS-led regime in Serbia, the largest number of constituents of the new coalition were present at several meetings in Belgrade during 2019 and 2020, organized by Serbian President (also the SNS chairman) Aleksandar Vučić, gathering "leaders of Serb communities" in Serbia's neighboring countries. The August 2020 election resulted in a victory for the opposition parties and the fall from power of the ruling DPS, which has ruled the country since the introduction of the multi-party system in 1990. The electoral coalition list won 32.55% of the popular vote, which equals 27 seats in the parliament, of which the Democratic Front member parties get 20 MPs. In October 2020, Democratic Front parliamentary club was joined by United Montenegro and the Workers' Party, while the Movement for Changes decided to form separate parliamentary group, under the name "Democratic Front - Movement for Changes".

Since a political split with their candidate for PM, Zdravko Krivokapić, after he questioned their competence to participate in his cabinet, leaders of the Democratic Front, Andrija Mandić and Nebojša Medojević started to publicly criticize the alleged influence of the Serbian Orthodox Church, as well of the businessman Miodrag Davidović on Krivokapić's decisions and on composition of his cabinet, which they eventually supported in parliament after all. Mandić claimed that Krivokapić had been appointed head of the "For the Future" list after "pressure and conditioning of electoral support" by "parts of the Serbian Church", accusing parts of the church and Krivokapić of "acting on someone's orders from abroad", while Medojević stated that Bishop Joanikije Mićović and priest Gojko Perović set the terms of the church's support and threatened to withdraw Krivokapić from the electoral list, a few days before handing over the electoral lists for 2020 parliamentary election, which Perović categorically denied. During October and November Medojević and Mandić have repeatedly conditioned their parties' support for the Krivokapić Cabinet, if they were not part of it. Mandić explicitly asked Krivokapić to "return the mandate and that they would look for a new PM designate". Unfoundedly accusing and public insults were publicly condemned by the Serbian Church, PM Krivokapić, Davidović, but also by the DF's coalition partner the Socialist People's Party, while the True Montenegro left the parliamentary group of the Democratic Front, out the protest.

The DF maintained a very close cooperation with the right-wing populist SNS regime in Serbia led by Aleksandar Vučić, President of Serbia. Since the mid-2010s, Vučić and members of his party have repeatedly publicly supported DF activities in Montenegro. In December 2020, Vučić, speaking to the media about Serbia future relation with the new government in Montenegro and PM Krivokapić, called DF leaders "sole true representatives of Serbian community in Montenegro". In 2021, Vučić even claimed the existence of a conspiracy that "many in Montenegro" allegedly want the "destruction" of this political alliance.

==== Dissolution ====
After an argument with Knežević on 13 May 2023, Medojević decided that the Movement for Changes (PZP) would have its own ticket in the 2023 parliamentary election. The day after, on 14 May 2023, the Democratic Front held a press conference where the leaders announced the dissolution of the alliance.

== Elections ==
=== Parliamentary elections ===
Parliament of Montenegro
Year	Popular vote	% of popular vote	Overall seats won	Seat change	Government
2012	82,773	22.82%	20 / 81	▲20	opposition
2016	77,784	20.32%	18 / 81	▼2	opposition
2020	133,261 (Note: Run within common Citizens' Group David Rakonjac For the Future of Montenegro electoral list, with Support SNP and the Popular Movement.)	32.55%	21 / 81	▲3	support 2020–22
2020	133,261	32.55%	21 / 81	▲3	opposition 2022–23

=== Presidential elections ===
President of Montenegro
Election year	#	Candidate	1st round votes	%	2nd round votes	%	Notes
2013	2nd	Miodrag Lekić	154,289	48.79%	—	—	
2018	2nd	Mladen Bojanić	111,711	33.40%	—	—	Independent, support
2023	3rd	Andrija Mandić	65,394	19.32%	—	—	

== Members ==
Party		Ideology	Leader	Since	No. of seats
New Serb Democracy; Nova srpska demokratija Нова српска демократија	NSD	National conservatism Serbian nationalism Russophilia	Andrija Mandić	2012–2023	9 / 81
Movement for Changes; Pokret za promjene Покрет за промјене	PzP	Right-wing populism Conspiracy theorism Euroscepticism	Nebojša Medojević	2012–2023	5 / 81
Democratic People's Party; Demokratska narodna partija Демократска народна партија	DNP	Social conservatism Populism; Russophilia	Milan Knežević	2012–2023	5 / 81
Workers' Party^{[a]} Radnička partija Радничка партија	RP	Social conservatism Populism	Maksim Vučinić	2015–2019; 2020–2023	1 / 81
Serbian Radical Party^{[b]} Srpska radikalna stranka Српска радикална странка	SRS	Serbian ultranationalism Russophilia	Ilija Darmanović	2016–2023	Non-parliamentary
Yugoslav Communist Party^{[b]} Jugoslovenska komunistička partija Југословенска комунистичка партија	JKP	Communism; Titoism; Yugoslavism	Zoran Radošević	2016–2023	Non-parliamentary
Free Montenegro^{[b]} Slobodna Crna Gora; Слободна Црнa Горa	SCG	Right-wing populism Social conservatism Serbian nationalism	Vladislav Dajković	2021–2023	Non-parliamentary

=== Former members ===
Party	Abbreviation	Ideology	Leader	Member
Party of United Pensioners and the Disabled; Partija ujedinjenih penzionera i invalida Партија уједињених пензионера и инвалида	PUPI	Single-issue politics Rights of pensioners Social justice	Momir Joksimović	2012–16
Democratic Party of Unity; Demokratska stranka jedinstva Демократска странка јединства	DSJ	Unionism; National conservatism Russophilia	Nebojša Jušković	2015–17
Resistance to Hopelessness; Otpor beznađu Отпор безнађу	OB	Populism; Anti-establishment; Military neutrality	Mladen Bojanić	2016–17
Democratic Serb Party; Demokratska srpska stranka Демократска српска странка	DSS	Christian democracy Cultural conservatism Unionism	Dragica Perović	2016–20
True Montenegro^{[a]} Prava Crna Gora; Права Црна Гора	Prava	Right-wing populism Serbian nationalism Military neutrality	Marko Milačić	In 2020
United Montenegro^{[a]} Ujedinjena Crna Gora; Уједињена Црна Гора	UCG	Conservatism; Pro-Europeanism; Unionism	Vladimir Dobričanin	2020–22

^{a} Members of the Democratic Front's parliamentary group only. ^{b} Regional-level partner parties

== Alliance leadership ==
- Miodrag Lekić (2012–2015)
- Presidency^{[a]} (2015–present)

=== Presidency ===
^{A} Since Lekić's abandonment the alliance, it is led by the Presidency, which consists of six members, two representatives from all three major parties; New Serb Democracy (NSD), Movement for Changes (PzP) and Democratic People's Party (DNP). Since March 2015 members of the collective presidency are:

NSD

- Andrija Mandić
- Strahinja Bulajić

PzP

- Nebojša Medojević
- Branko Radulović

DNP

- Milan Knežević
- Predrag Bulatović

== See also ==
- 2015–2016 Montenegrin crisis
- 2016 Montenegrin coup allegations
- 2019–2020 Montenegrin crisis
