= 2019–2020 clerical protests in Montenegro =

Anticorruption protests in Montenegro

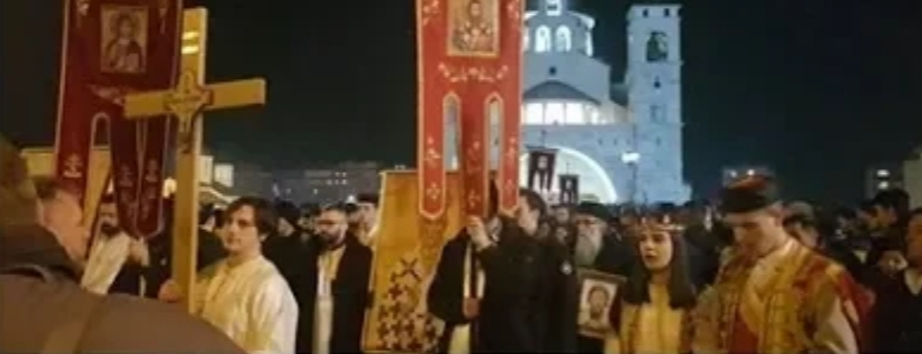
- Protest prayer walks in front of the Cathedral of the Resurrection of Christ in Podgorica, on 26 January 2020
- Date: 24 December 2019 – 30 August 2020 (8 months and 6 days)
- Location: Montenegro
- Caused by: Anti-Serbian sentiment; Law on religious freedoms; Religious discrimination; Authoritarianism of Milo Đukanović; Police brutality
- Goals: Withdrawal of the disputed law
- Methods: Nonviolent protest marches, road block protests, barricade, civil disobedience
- Result: Serbian Orthodox Church victory; Opposition parties win the 2020 elections.; Controversial parts of the Law removed; DPS rule in Montenegro that started in 1991 ends.; Start of Montenegrin nationalist protests

Parties
Serbian Orthodox Church; Serbs of Montenegro: Serb National Council; "Ne damo Crnu Goru"; Supporting political subjects: Democratic Front; United Montenegro; Socialist People's Party; Workers' Party; True Montenegro; Democratic Montenegro; DEMOS (partial); Supported by: Serbia; Republika Srpska	Government of Montenegro; Ministry of Justice; Ministry of Internal Affairs; National Security Agency; Police Directorate of Montenegro; Supporting organizations: Democratic Socialists; Social Democrats; Liberals; Bosniak Party; Albanian List (partial); Croatian Civic Initiative; Social Democratic Party; The Montenegrin; Montenegrin Orthodox Church; Montenegrin Movement

Lead figures
Amfilohije Radović; Joanikije Mićović Zdravko Krivokapić; Ratko Mitrović; Miodrag Davidović Andrija Mandić; Nebojša Medojević; Milan Knežević; Marko Carević; Goran Danilović; Marko Milačić; Vladimir Joković; Vladimir Pavićević; Aleksa Bečić	Milo Đukanović; Milan Roćen Duško Marković; Zoran Pažin; Predrag Bošković; Aleksandar Bogdanović; Mevludin Nuhodžić; Srđan Darmanović Branimir Gvozdenović; Ivan Brajović; Rafet Husović; Ranko Krivokapić; Andrija Popović Miraš Dedeić; Jevrem Brković

In late December 2019, a wave of protests started against the controversial, newly adopted "Law on Freedom of Religion or Belief and the Legal Status of Religious Communities" which effectively transferred ownership of church buildings and estates built before 1918 (when the Kingdom of Montenegro was abolished and annexed by Kingdom of Serbia) from the Serbian Orthodox Church in Montenegro to the Montenegrin state. The Serbian Orthodox Church in Montenegro, which owned 66 mainly medieval monasteries, dozens of churches and other real estate there, insisted the state wanted to impound its assets, while Pro-Western Montenegro's president Milo Đukanović, accused the Serbian church of promoting pro-Serb policies that are aimed at "undermining Montenegrin statehood".

== Background ==
Montenegro has experienced less religious conflict than the other former Yugoslavian states, and has historically had a high degree of religious tolerance and diversity. There is, however, an outstanding dispute between the Serbian Orthodox Church and the Montenegrin Orthodox Church, as both churches lay claim to the country's many Orthodox religious sites and dispute each other's legitimacy. Churches disputed over control of the 750 Orthodox religious sites in the country. Both groups claim to be the "true" Orthodox Church of Montenegro, and hold religious ceremonies separately. Police forces have provided security for such events. This dispute dates back to the original establishment of the Montenegrin Orthodox Church as a separate entity in 1993. Since 2011, members of both churches have been barred from celebrating the transfiguration of Christ at the Church of Christ in Ivanova Korita village near the historical capital of Cetinje.

According to the 2017 survey conducted by the Council of Europe in cooperation with the Office of the state ombudsman, 45% of respondents reported having experienced religious discrimination and perception of discrimination were highest by a significant margin among Serbian Orthodox Church members. In May 2019, the Venice Commission positively evaluated the proposed draft of the Law on Freedom of Religion, but recognized the articles 62 and 63, related to the church property, as substantive issues and one of the most controversial points. They stated that the state may in certain conditions use property, but that it must provide the right to property of religious communities.

At the eight Congress of the ruling Democratic Party of Socialists of Montenegro (DPS) in October 2019, a new political program of the party was adopted, stating that one of the main program goals of the party in the coming period is the "renewal" of the Montenegrin Orthodox Church, which is currently unrecognized by other Eastern Orthodox churches, announcing the adoption of a new law on the status of religious communities.

== Passing the law in December 2019 and attendant protests ==
Historical flag of Montenegro, one of the symbols of the protests.

On 24 December 2019, the legislative committee of Montenegro's parliament endorsed a draft Law on Freedom of Religion or Belief and the Legal Status of Religious Communities, the last hurdle before the legislation was debated by lawmakers. Hundreds of SOC priests and monks, headed by metropolitan Amfilohije Radović, protested in front of parliament before the committee session demanding the bill's withdrawal. After the protest, the clergy celebrated a liturgy at the Cathedral of the Resurrection of Christ, Podgorica and signed a statement pledging to defend the church. Ahead of a vote on the draft Law on Religious Freedoms, expected later on Thursday or on Friday of the same week, Serbian Orthodox clergy and believers held a service on a packed bridge near parliament, watched by police who had sealed off city center roads and approaches to the government building.

On 27 December 2019, the bill was approved by 45 ruling coalition lawmakers, sparking a series of massive protests and road blockages which continued to February 2020. Eighteen members of the parliament (opposition Democratic Front MPs) were arrested prior to the voting and charged with violently disrupting the vote. Some Serb Orthodox clerics were attacked by police and a number of journalists, opposition activists and protesting citizens were arrested.

On 29 December 2019 Episcopal Council of the Serbian Orthodox Church in Montenegro excommunicated President of Montenegro Đukanović and Government coalition MPs and officials for passing religious law.

== 2020 religion law protests ==
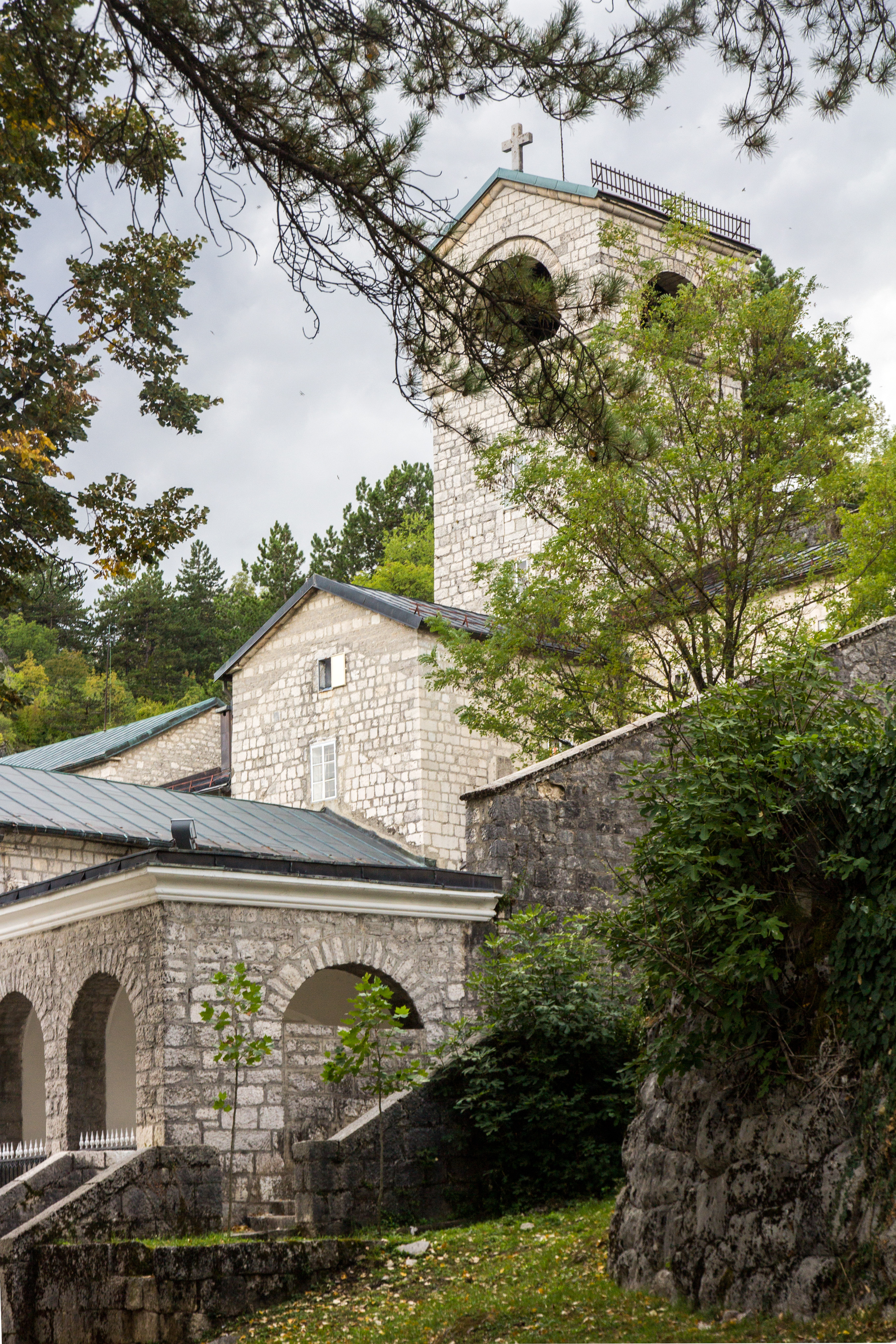
Cetinje Monastery, the seat of the Metropolitanate of Montenegro and the Littoral

Demonstrations continued into January, February and March 2020 as peaceful protest walks, mostly organised by the Metropolitanate of Montenegro and the Littoral of the Serbian Orthodox Church in most of Montenegrin municipalities. As time went on a considerable percentage of Montenegro's population took to streets opposing the law. During February public gatherings reached over 70,000 attendees in Podgorica. During peaceful protests in early 2020, more cases of police abuse of office and violence against protesting citizens and political activists were reported, while several opposition activists and journalists were also arrested.

European External Action Service (EEAS) pointed at fair reporting but also propaganda, disinformation and fake news in the media reports on the riots and the political crisis in Montenegro, which reached its peaks in the first week of January 2020. EEAS reported that sources of the false reporting included media which were based in Serbia (some of them state-owned), Russian-owned in Serbian language media Sputnik and some Montenegro-based news portals. In March 2020 all protests have been paused by the Serbian Orthodox Church due to COVID-19 pandemic in Montenegro.

Amid the 12 May protest in Nikšić a correspondent journalist of Serbia-based Večernje Novosti was arrested and his eyes were pepper sprayed while he reporting from the protest. The journalist was released after three hours, but the material he had filmed was deleted by the police, which many media and NGOs characterized as an attack on media freedoms in Montenegro. Both the Associations of Journalists of Montenegro and Serbia condemned the arrest.

On 13 May Bishop of Budimlja and Nikšić Joanikije Mićović and several other priests were arrested on charges of alleged organisation of a religious protest rally in Nikšić, although public gatherings were forbidden in the country due to the coronavirus pandemic.

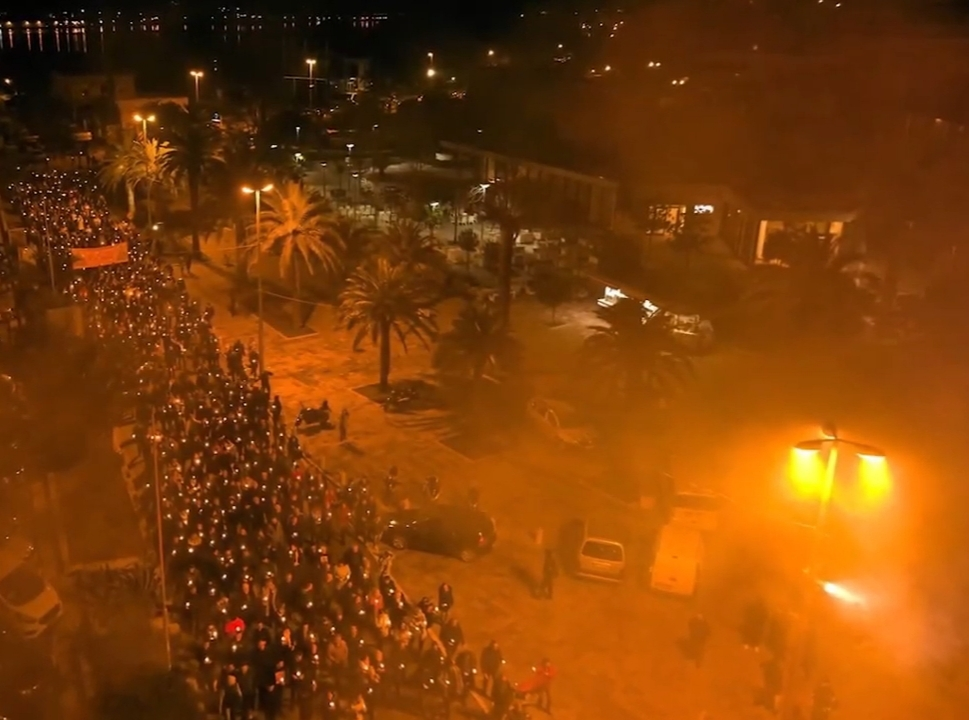
Protest prayer walks (litije), in front of the Old Town of Kotor, Jan 2020.

The police responded violently towards the peaceful protesters, with several police crackdowns taking place, resulting in beatings and arrests which were criticised by other governments of Europe. Serbian authorities has repeatedly demanded release of bishop Joanikije, as well the other arrested Serb Orthodox clerics. During the next few days, the protests continued throughout the country, a couple of thousand remaining protesting citizens demanded the release of the arrested eparchy priests from detention, with more cases of police brutality reported. On 16 May the Bishop of Budimlja and Niksić, Joanikije, along with other arrested clerics, were released after 72 hours passed from the processing, in accordance with the law, although a formal lawsuit was created against Joanikije and other arrested clerics, and is, as of 16 May, pending.

The mass protests resumed in June, but after a few weeks, the Montenegrin government reintroduced a ban on public and religious gatherings due to a new wave of COVID-19 virus spread, so the protests were stopped again. Protestors labeled the government's move as political, to stem protests against the enactment of a religion law, during the August 2020 parliamentary election campaign in the country. Even if public gatherings were banned, protesters organized several anti-government and pro-church protest walks during July and August, as well as protest car rallies, protesting against the law on religious communities and the DPS-led government.

== Montenegrin authorities' reaction ==
Montenegrin government and ruling Democratic Party of Socialists officials, including president Milo Đukanović and members of the current Cabinet of Montenegro blamed the Belgrade-based media and Government of Serbia for the current political crisis, destabilization and unrest across the country, claiming that the ongoing Church protests actually are not against the disputed law but against Montenegrin statehood and independence. Serbian Orthodox Church in Montenegro categorically rejects that allegations. President Milo Đukanović called the protesting citizens "a lunatic movement".

== International reactions ==
=== Serbian reactions ===
Foreign Minister of Serbia Ivica Dačić said the Montenegrin government should discuss the controversial Religious Law with its citizens and called on Serbian citizens of Montenegrin descent to publicly state their views on the recent developments in Montenegro, saying that people who support Montenegrin Government should have their Serbian citizenship reviewed.

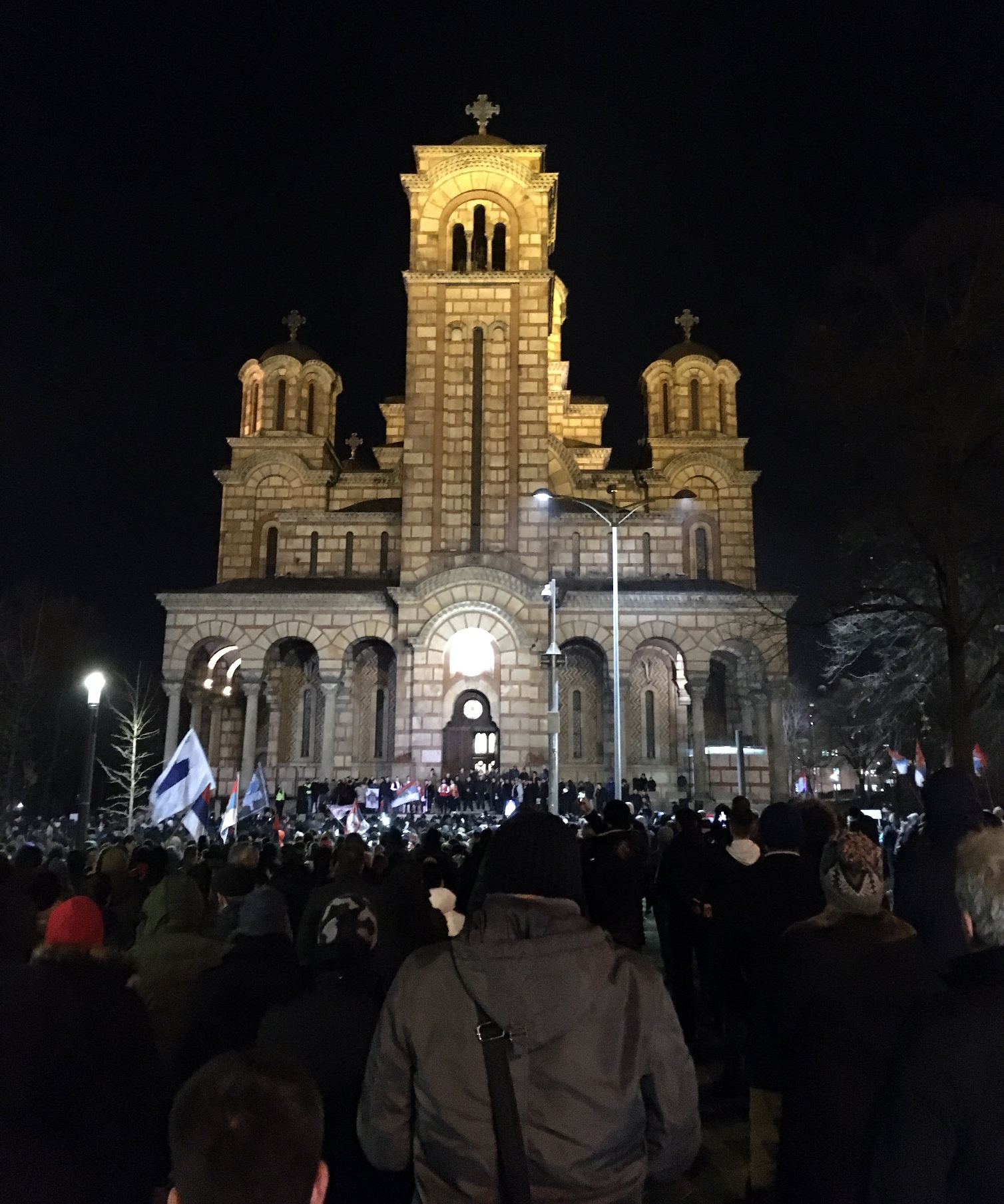
Protest in Belgrade over the controversial Church law in Montenegro

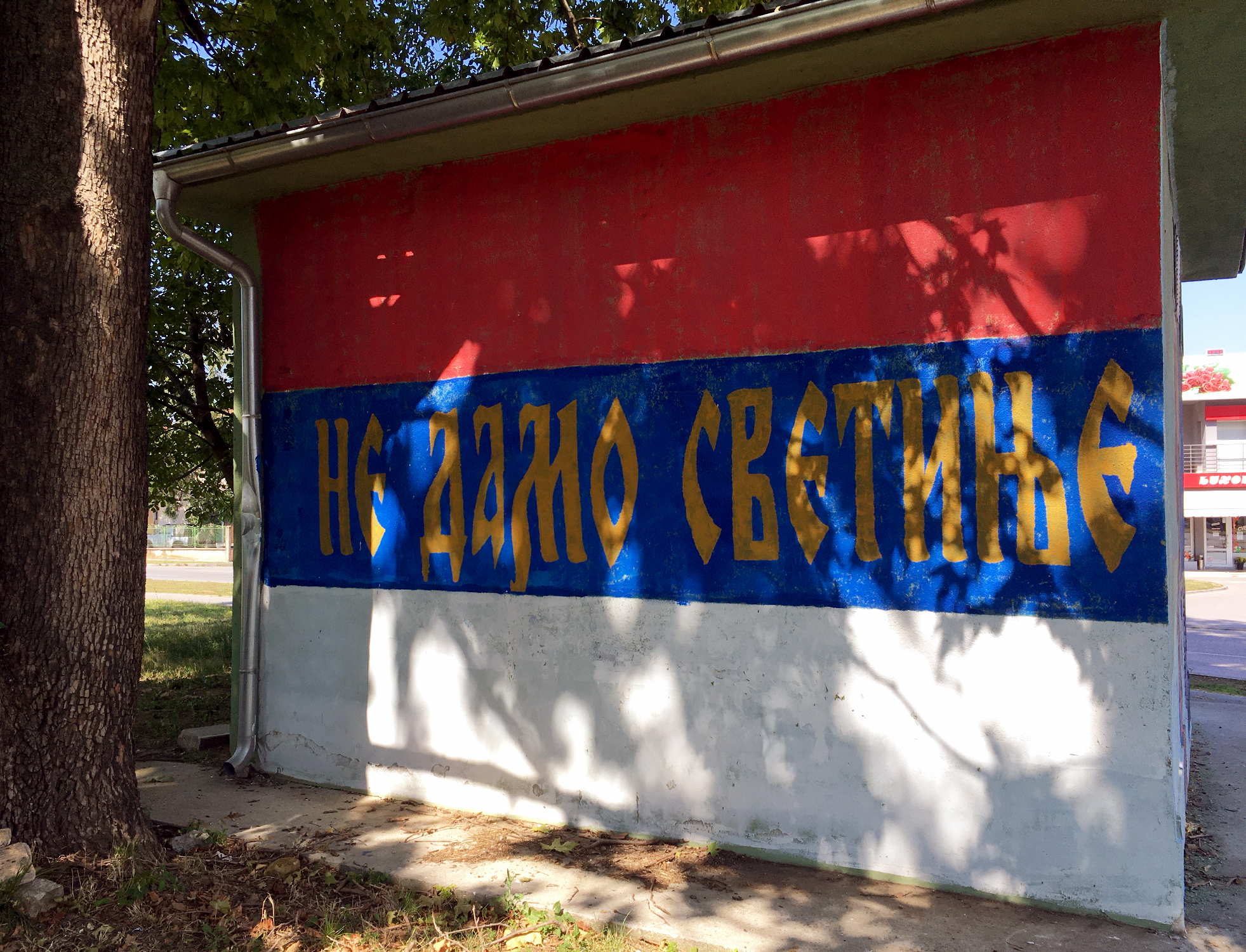
Slogan of the protests (Ne damo svetinje) as a street graffiti

Following mass protests by Serbian Orthodox Church and ethnic Serbs in Montenegro agitation against the law has spread to neighbouring Serbia. On 2 January 2020, several thousand fans of the Red Star Belgrade marched to the Montenegrin embassy in Belgrade to support the protests in Montenegro against the law, setting off fireworks that partially burned the flag of Montenegro outside the embassy building. Several Serbian far-right organisations also joined the rally. Although the event was announced, the embassy was allegedly left unguarded by the Serbian police, with only undercover security units present, which sparked criticism from Montenegro. President of Serbia Aleksandar Vučić denied these claims and stated that the embassy was well-guarded and Serbian Ministry of Foreign Affairs condemned the vandalism and stated that the Montenegrin government is trying to shift the blame for ongoing crisis on Serbia.

Peaceful protest against the controversial Religious Law took place in Belgrade, Novi Sad, Kragujevac, and a number of other cities and towns in Serbia.

Hip-hop collective Beogradski sindikat released a song about the ongoing protest. When attempting to enter Montenegro they were not allowed entrance, and another group member was deported from Podgorica Airport without any official explanation. Tennis player Novak Djokovic supported the ongoing protests, as well as Basketball player Nikola Mirotić.

==== Bosnia and Herzegovina ====
Citizens of Bijeljina, Trebinje, Pale, Gacko and Banja Luka organised several peaceful protest against the proclaimed law. Serb member of the Presidency of Bosnia and Herzegovina Milorad Dodik also participated in the protest rally in Banja Luka, calling the law discriminatory against the Serbian church and its property and called for law withdrawal. A group of citizens from Gacko walked several kilometers in order to support the ongoing peaceful protests, but was not allowed entry to Montenegro as they were deemed "threat to national security of Montenegro".

==== Diaspora ====
Around 2,000 people from Chicago metropolitan area protested against the proclaimed law. On 8 March 2020 the Serbian Orthodox Eparchy of Austria and Switzerland organized a protest rally against the Montenegrin religion law in Vienna.

=== Russian reactions ===
Metropolitan Hilarion (Alfeyev) stated that the Russian Orthodox Church firmly stands with the position held by Serbian Orthodox Church. He also stated that the newly adopted law represents direct meddling of Montenegrin government into affairs of the church.

On 29 February 2020 Metropolitan Onufriy (Berezovsky), the head of the Ukrainian Orthodox Church (Moscow Patriarchate), participated in and led a prayer walk and protest rally in Podgorica, reflecting tense relations between the Montenegrin government and Russia.

The Ministry of Foreign Affairs of Russia publicly denied all of the allegations of the Montenegrin government on the involvement of the Russian Federation in events and ongoing crisis in Montenegro.

=== United States reactions ===
In the annual International Religious Freedom Report, the State Department wrote that the Serbian Orthodox Church strongly criticized the law, which stipulates religious property lacking clear ownership and that, after the passing of the religion law, they organized regular peaceful protests in which hundreds of thousands turned out. The report said that the Montenegrin government continued its policy of not providing restitution of religious properties expropriated by the former Yugoslav communist government, as well as that contrary to the announcements, this law did not address the restitution issues. Furthermore, the State Department described the protests as generally peaceful except for isolated incidents of violence against the police, accompanied by online incitements to violence. The report mentioned that the government and analysts said there was an apparently coordinated campaign of disinformation, propaganda, and provocation, "seeking to fan ethnonationalistic divisions and provoke conflict through the protests."

In June 2020 the United States Commission on International Religious Freedom state that Christian rights have been attacked in Montenegro by a controversial law, and protests continue after the adoption of the Law on Religion, which many believe will allow the government to confiscate religious property, the ban on religious gatherings during the COVID-19 pandemic has further increased tensions. Commissioner Johnnie Moore Jr. pay special attention to the arrest of Metropolitan Amfilohije. Commission are critical of the rather restrained attitude of European officials towards such persecution of Christians. The decision not to extend the position of the European Union Special Envoy, whose mandate included the promotion of freedom of religion and belief, is marked as particularly unjustified.

=== Non-governmental organizations ===
The Helsinki Committee for Human Rights in Serbia, a non-governmental organization concerned with human rights issues in Serbia, accused the government of Serbia of standing behind the riots and attempt to destabilize Montenegro and influence the internal affairs of this country.

Freedom House, the US-based non-governmental organization that measures the degree of civil liberties and political rights in the world, described that the religion law is widely seen to target the Serbian Orthodox Church and that its adoption as one of the "questionable decisions". They explain that the requirements of the law likely burden the Serbian Orthodox Church and that it provoked peaceful nationwide protests.

== See also ==
- Montenegrin nationalist protests (2020–2022)
- 2019 Montenegrin anti-corruption protests
- 2021 Montenegrin episcopal enthronement protests
