= Amphilochus =

Amphilochus, Amphilochos or Amphílokhos may refer to:

- 5244 Amphilochos, Jovian asteroid
- Amphilochus (crustacean), a genus of amphipods
- Amphilochus (mythology), several people in Greek mythology

== See also ==
- Amphilochius (disambiguation)
