= Boris Bojović =

Metropolitan of Montenegro since 2023

His Beatitude Boris
- Archbishop of Cetinje and Metropolitan of Montenegro
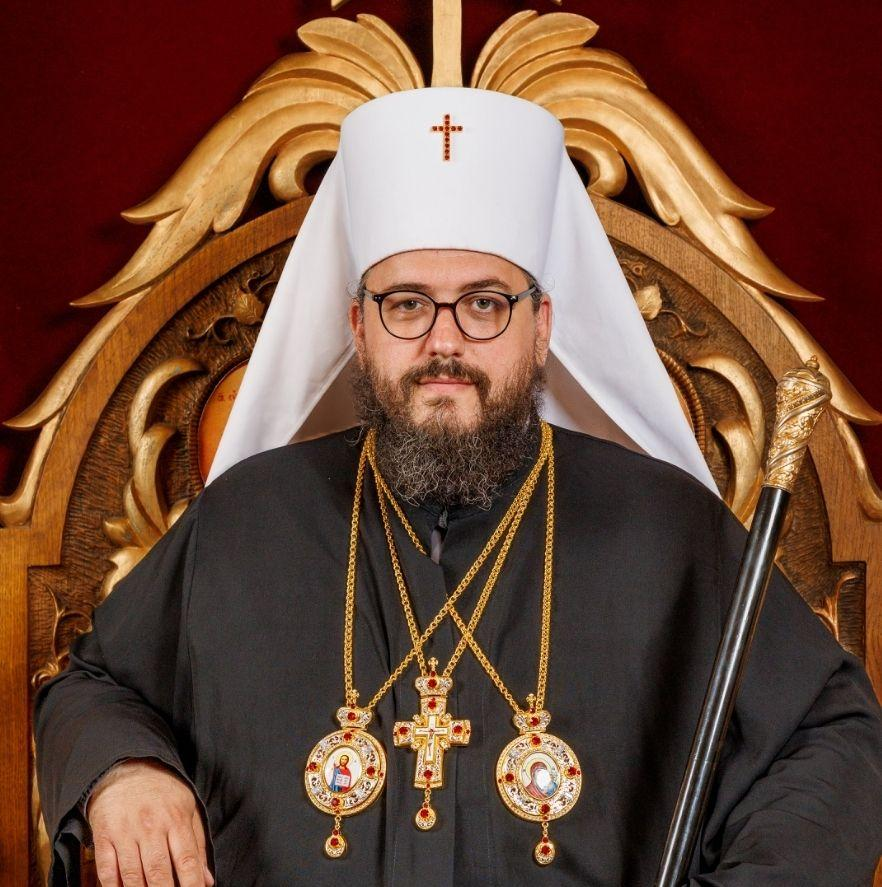
- Native name: Бојан Бојовић; Борис Бојовић
- Church: Montenegrin Orthodox Church
- Elected: 3 September 2023
- Installed: 3 September 2023
- Predecessor: Miraš Dedeić

Orders
- Ordination: 17 June 2019 by Miraš Dedeić
- Consecration: 2016 by Filaret Denysenko

Personal details
- Born: Bojan Bojović; 1981 (age 44–45) Nikšić, SR Montenegro, SFR Yugoslavia
- Denomination: Eastern Orthodoxy

Bojan Bojović (Montenegrin Cyrillic: Бојан Бојовић; born 1981), known by the name Boris Bojović (Montenegrin Cyrillic: Борис Бојовић), is the disputed third metropolitan of the non-canonical Montenegrin Orthodox Church.

== Early life ==
According to Bojović, as a young child, he was pushed away from the Serbian Orthodox Church by the behavior of Serbian Orthodox Church Metropolitan of Montenegro, Amfilohije Radović, during the Yugoslav Wars.

In 1996, Bojović began attending the Church of Saint George and singing in its choir. In June 1998, Bojović joined the Montenegrn Orthodox Church and in July, he was promoted to subdeacon. While he wished to immediately attend a seminary, his parents pushed him to attend regular schooling. In 2003, upon finishing his schooling, Bojović moved to Italy, where he studied theology.

== Montenegrin Orthodox Church ==
=== Early career ===
In January 2006, upon returning from Italy, Bojović became a deacon of the Montenegrin Orthodox Church in 2006. He also studied at the National University of Kyiv-Mohyla Academy, where he was consecrated by Filaret Denysenko in 2016.

In 2016, Bojović became an archimandrite of the Ukrainian Orthodox Church – Kyiv Patriarchate. On 26 May 2019, he celebrated liturgy at St. Michael Cathedral in Kiev, representing the Montenegrin Orthodox Church.

In 2017, he returned to Montenegro as an archimandrite. In October of that year, he was with Miraš Dedeić, otherwise known as Mihailo, during a confrontation between Mihailo and a Serbian Orthodox deacon named Igor Balaban.

On 17 June 2019, Bojović was ordained as a bishop of the Montenegrin Orthodox Church by Mihailo, becoming the fourth bishop of the church and the bishop of Nikšić. Two days later, on 19 June, Epiphanius I of Ukraine sent a public letter of apology to Bartholomew, Ecumenical Patriarch of Constantinople, apologizing for having interacted with Bojović and co-served with him. This came after the Orthodox Church of Ukraine had been granted autocephaly by Bartholomew earlier in the year.

=== Bishop ===
In 2020, Bojović was granted the "Da je vječna Crna Gora – Milorad Mido Vujošević" award by the Krstaš Association, a Serbian organization meant to recognize figures who contribute to Montenegrin culture.

In 2020, amidst the 2019–2020 clerical protests, Bojović encouraged Montenegrin Orthodox believers to support the church and the Montenegrin government. In May 2021, Bojović was accused of encouraging violence against Joanikije Mićović preceding his enthronement ceremony. This included him accusing Joanikije of being a Serbian state asset. Bojović later claimed that his remarks had been taken out of context. However, later in 2021, he echoed a similar sentiment when he supported the Montenegrin episcopal enthronement protests, which sought to oppose the enthronement of Joanikije Mićović.

In 2021, Bojović attended the 26th anniversary of the Srebrenica massacre. However, in 2023, he publicly boycotted the event, due to participation from the Serbian Orthodox Church.

On 24 April, 2022, amidst the Russian invasion of Ukraine, Bojović encouraged intersectional peace between different nations and religions, saying "It was Catholic Easter, today is Orthodox Easter, and then Eid arrives. We've achieved our 40-day fast, and now it's the moon of the great Ramadan. Honest believers welcome each of those holidays with love and hope that they will be better, and always some who don't think as much as we do, who don't want to build their life in love with others, bring us back to all of what we went through about thirty years ago in then Yugoslavia"

On 18 October, 2022, Bojović visited Brooklyn, where he served liturgy for a group of Montenegrin diaspora believers. This was the first Montenegrin Orthodox liturgy performed in New York since 1923.

=== Schism ===
The second metropolitan of Montenegro, Mihailo, had become unpopular due to several controversies. This included conflicts with the Serbian Orthodox Church, the clerical protests, and the episcopal enthronement protests.

On 17 April, 2023, a phone conversation between Mihailo and Bojović was leaked on social media. In it, Bojović alleged corruption on the behalf of Mihailo, including misuse of Russian money. However, Bojović also stressed the long bond of the two men and claimed that he wished for them to work together.

On 28 August, 2023, Bojović announced his intentions to dethrone Mihailo, asking for Montenegrin Orthodox Church followers to come to a ceremony on 3 September 2023. In addition to posting online, Bojović advertised this gathering in person. He called for the General Assembly of Montenegro to meet to elect a new metropolitan. Following this, Mihailo threatened legal action.

On 3 September 2023, Bojović was elected Archbishop of Cetinje by the General Assembly of Montenegro. This was disputed by Mihailo, who claimed that the assembly did not have the authority to remove him as archbishop and replace him with Bojović. He claimed that the gathering was a "failed political rally" that has "neither legitimacy nor legality". At the same time, a process began to canonize Antonije Abramović. Despite Mihailo's disputes, Bojović was supported by a crowd of approximately 10,000 people. Only a small number group of laity, as well as one priest and one deacon, chose to side with Mihailo.

Mihailo sought legal intervention from the Montenegrin government. His aim was to have the Montenegrin government restore power to him, as well as returning access to church land and possessions. However, on 31 October 2023, his claim was rejected. The claim had sought to ban Bojović from hosting service in the Ivan Crnojević church. Since Mihailo and Bojović represented the same religious organization, it was ruled that Mihailo would have to seek a separate procedure.

On 24 June, 2024, the Supreme Court of Montenegro ruled on the case. It ruled that, as the Montenegrin Orthodox Church is autonomous and distinct from the Montenegrin government, the government would not become involved in church matters. Thus, it would not prohibit Bojovic from becoming metropolitan.

=== Archbishop of Cetinje ===
In May 2024, Bojović said that he would seek autocephaly via the approval of the Ecumenical Patriarch of Constantinople, Bartholomew. Bartholomew had previously denied the MOC autocephaly due to the behavior of previous metropolitans. Bojović mentioned that there had been contact between him and the Ecumenical Patriarchate of Constantinople. However, he admitted that the church schisms made it difficult, as it meant that Constantinople would have to choose which of them to recognize.

On 6 January, 2024, police intervened following a confrontation between Bojović and Mihailo's supporters during a Christmas celebration. Days before the confrontation, Mihailo had made statements denouncing Bojović, telling people to not attend his service.

On September 1 2024, Bojović met with Kosovo prime minister Albin Kurti. Together with several other notable figures, they discussed regional politics and Russian influence.

In 2024, Bojovic attended the annual Srebrenica massacre memorial, which included putting out a statement comparing it to the ongoing Gaza genocide.

In December 2024, the Romanian Orthodox Church put out a statement in response to a meeting between Bojović and a defrocked Romanian Orthodox priest named Emilian Prodan. The Romanian Orthodox Church preemptively denied any legitimacy the meeting might have given the Montenegrin Orthodox Church.

In January 2026, following the announcement by the Foreign Intelligence Service of Russia that Bartholomew would soon be recognizing one of the branches of the Montenegrin Orthodox church, Bojović insisted that his version of the church would be recognized. At the same time, he also decried the Serbian Orthodox Church as fascist Chetnik supporters. Mihailo also insisted that his version of the church would be the one recognized. However, Emmanuel Adamakis, Metropolitan of Chalcedon, denied such claims and said that there had been no contact.

Several days later, on 22 January 2026, Bojović claimed to have met with Orthodox Church of Finland archbishop, Elia Wallgrén, while on a trip in Rome. He used this to claim further contact with canon churches, contradicting Emmanuel's refutation. Elia disputed this, claiming that the two had only met momentarily. Elia also disputed a picture that had been taken of the two together, saying it was taken without them spending time together.

In May 2026, Bojović visited Chicago and New York and participated in mass for the Montenegrin diaspora of those cities. While in Chicago, he met with Emil Škrijelj, a Montenegrin Bosniak imam.

== Personal life ==
Bojović and Kirilo Bojović, bishop of the Serbian Orthodox Eparchy of Buenos Aires, South America, and Central America, are cousins. However, due to their religious divide, the two are not close.

In addition to Montenegrin, Bojović also speaks Ukrainian, having studied theology in Kyiv, and Italian, which he studied for three years in Rome, as well as English, Spanish, Russian, and Romanian.

In 2008, during Assumption of Mary celebrations, Bojović and his uncle were attacked. Later, the attackers were tried for attempted murder.
