= Anti-Montenegrin sentiment =

Negative towards Montenegro and its citizens

Anti-Montenegrin sentiment is a generally negative view of Montenegrins as an ethnic group, commonly involving denial of the Montenegrin ethnicity and language, and negative feelings towards Montenegro. It is present in right-wing discourse in Montenegro and the ex-Yugoslavia region, mainly Serbia, and dates back to the 19th and 20th century.

== In the media ==
Although Montenegrin right-wing media such as IN4S often attempt to display historical proof that Montenegrins are Serbs and that the Montenegrin nationality doesn't exist, the most common examples of anti-Montenegrin sentiment are found in Serbian media. Serbia wields its media influence to spread narratives and disinformation, employing bombastic headlines regarding Montenegro's development as a country. In 2020, Happy TV and TV Pink S were suspended from broadcasting on Montenegrin cable TV by media regulation for 3 months because their talk-show programs where they promoted hate speech, intolerance and discrimination against Montenegrins.

Serbian tourists visit Montenegro in large numbers. In summer 2019, for example, upwards of 460,000 Serbian tourists visited the country. Because of the tourism industry's significant importance as a means of national income and the intense Serbian interest in vacationing in the country, the industry is high on the list of targets against which Serbian media spread disinformation, especially in the lead up to the summer season. Many articles from Serbian outlets cast Montenegro as an expensive and unsafe tourist destination with dirty beaches and aggressive locals, featuring headlines such as: “Tourists massively cancel their vacations in Montenegro” and “Snakes came out from the sea and went after people on the Buljarica beach.” Similar discourse has been observed in prior years, but so far it has not impacted the number of Serbian visitors or the overall tourism economy.

== In governments ==
=== Bosnia and Herzegovina ===
The June 2020 plenary session of the National Assembly of the Republic of Srpska consisted of nationalistic and anti-Montenegrin remarks, along with heavy insults against the highest officials of Montenegro.

In 2021, Banja Luka mayor Draško Stanivuković said the Montenegrin nation was 'made up' and called the 2006 independence referendum fake.

=== Serbia ===
After the dissolution of the State Union of Serbia and Montenegro and the Montenegrin independence that followed, Serbian influence has become more and more apparent.

Minister of Health of Serbia Zlatibor Lončar claimed that there are too many Montenegrins and that he tends not to have Montenegrins working in Serbian institutions.

Members of Serbia's Montenegrin Party have claimed that the latest textbooks in Serbia are written in such a way as to belittle Montenegrin history and that they are full of forgeries. In September 2022, the Montenegrin Ministry of Foreign Affairs demanded that Serbia removes explicit material, pushing the narrative that Montenegro tried to ethnically cleanse Serbs, from its textbooks.

== In the Serbian Orthodox Church ==
Serbia also exerts its influence through a church in Montenegro: the Metropolitanate of Montenegro and the Littoral, the largest eparchy of the Serbian Orthodox Church and the dominant church in Montenegro. The church is often criticised for its heavy political involvement that sometimes raises concerns in EU institutions.

Since the breakup of Yugoslavia, religious figures of the Serbian Orthodox Church, including the late Metropolitan Amfilohije and Patriarch Irinej, and, to a lesser extent, their successors Joanikije II and Porfirije, dispute the existence of Montenegrins as a nation, calling them "the bastards of Milovan Đilas". The Serbian Orthodox Church actively criticises the existence of Montenegrin language, calling it artificial.
