= Bare, Kolašin =

Bare
- Settlement
- Location of Bare in Montenegro
- Coordinates: 42°41′08″N 19°53′00″E
- Country: Montenegro
- Region: Northern
- Municipality: Kolašin

Population (2011)
  - Total: 63
- Time zone: UTC+1 (CET)
  - Summer (DST): UTC+2 (CEST)

Bare (Montenegrin Cyrillic: Баре) is a small settlement in Kolašin, Montenegro. According to the 2011 census, it had a population of 63 people.

The settlement is most known as the birthplace of Amfilohije (Radović), metropolitan bishop of the Serbian Orthodox Church.
