= Amfilohije Radović =

Metropolitan of Montenegro

His Grace, Primate Amfilohije PhD, Th.D
- Metropolitan of Montenegro and the Littoral
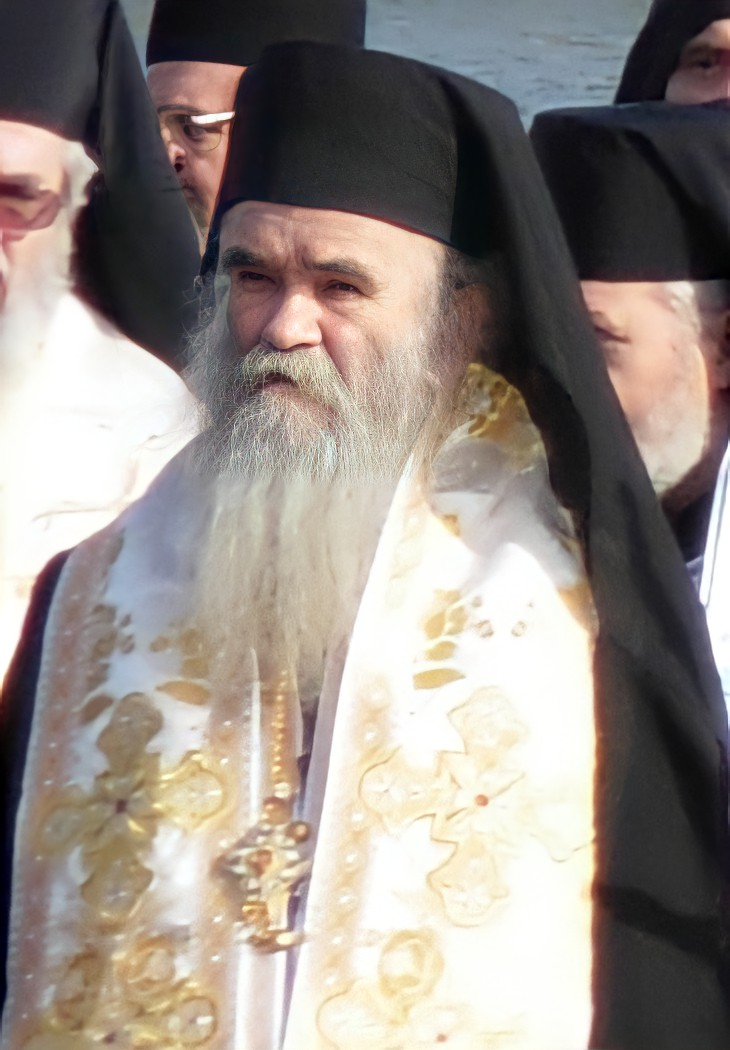
- Metropolitan Amfilohije in 2012
- Native name: Амфилохије
- Church: Serbian Orthodox Church
- Diocese: Metropolitanate of Montenegro and the Littoral
- Installed: 30 December 1990
- Term ended: 30 October 2020
- Predecessor: Danilo III
- Successor: Joanikije II
- Previous posts: Eparchy of Banat (1985–1990)

Orders
- Ordination: 1967 in Greek Orthodox Church
- Consecration: 1985 by German, Serbian Patriarch
- Rank: Metropolitan, Archbishop

Personal details
- Born: Risto Radović; 7 January 1938 Bare Radovića, Zeta Banovina, Kingdom of Yugoslavia (now Montenegro)
- Died: 30 October 2020 (aged 82) Podgorica, Montenegro
- Buried: Cathedral of the Resurrection of Christ, Podgorica
- Denomination: Eastern Orthodoxy
- Education: University of Belgrade; Pontifical Oriental Institute; University of Athens
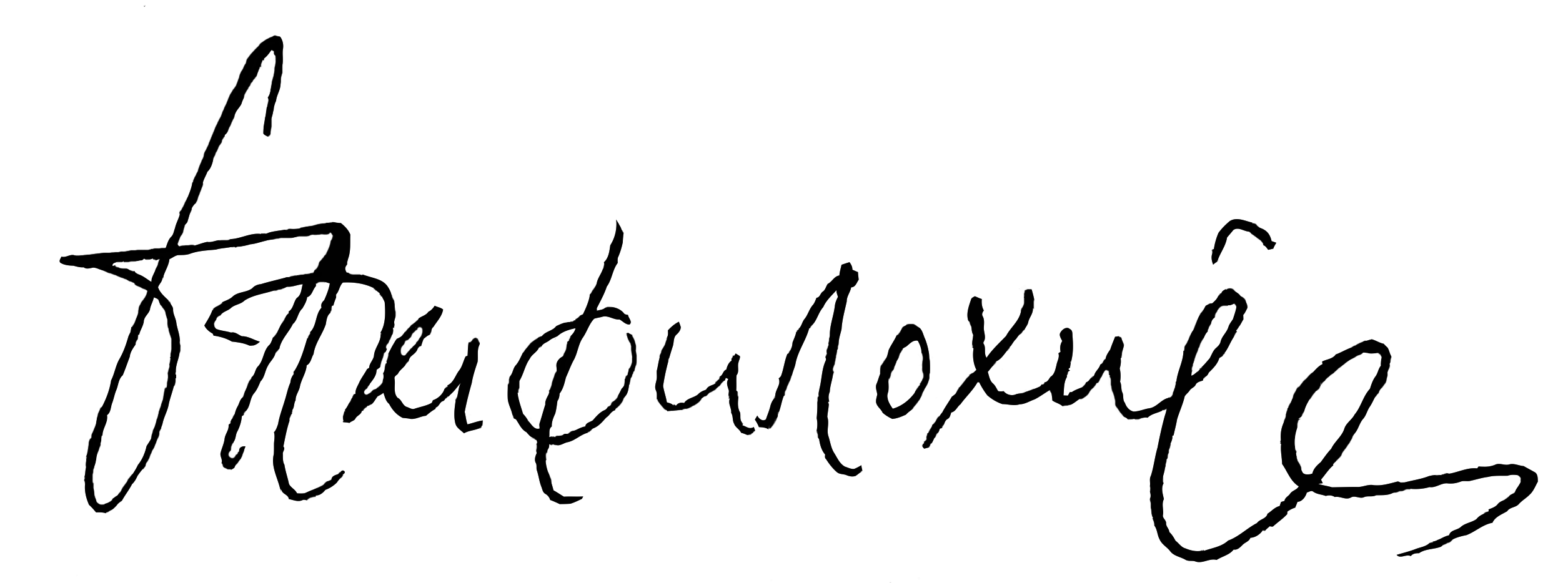
- Signature

Amfilohije (Serbian Cyrillic: Амфилохије; pronounced [amfilɔ̌xijɛ râːdɔv̞itɕ], English: Amphilochius; born Risto Radović, 7 January 1938 – 30 October 2020) was a bishop of the Serbian Orthodox Church, theologian, university professor, author and translator. He was first the Bishop of Banat between 1985 and 1990, and then the Metropolitan Bishop of Montenegro and the Littoral from 1990, until his death. As the metropolitan bishop, he was the primate of the Serbian Orthodox Church in Montenegro. He was one of the most influential leaders of the Serbian Church, and was among the three candidates for the Serbian patriarchate both in 1990 and 2010.

Amfilohije's honorary and liturgical title was: His Grace, Archbishop of Cetinje, Metropolitan of Montenegro and the Littoral, of Zeta, Brda (the Highlands) and the Skenderija, and the Exarch of the Holy Throne of Peć.

More than 569 churches and monasteries of the Serbian Orthodox Church in Montenegro were built or reconstructed during his reign. A noted theologian and author, his bibliography consists of more than 1,000 items and his selected works were published in 36 volumes.

Amfilohije was described as one of the most powerful people in Montenegro, as well as one of the most influential individuals within the Bishops' Council of the Serbian Orthodox Church, the supreme body of the Serbian Orthodox Church.

== Biography ==
=== Early life, education and personal life ===
Amfilohije was born as Risto Radović (Cyrillic: Ристо Радовић) in Bare Radovića in Lower Morača, Kingdom of Yugoslavia (now Montenegro). He was a descendant of voivode Mina Radović who participated in the unification of the Morača tribe with the Principality of Montenegro in 1820.

He studied at St. Sava's Seminary and graduated from the Faculty of Theology in 1962 in Belgrade, which at the time was a part of the SFR Yugoslavia. During his time as a seminarian in the late 1950s, he knew Justin Popović, a SOC cleric and admired the uncompromising position he held toward modern civilisation. He also studied classical philology in Belgrade.

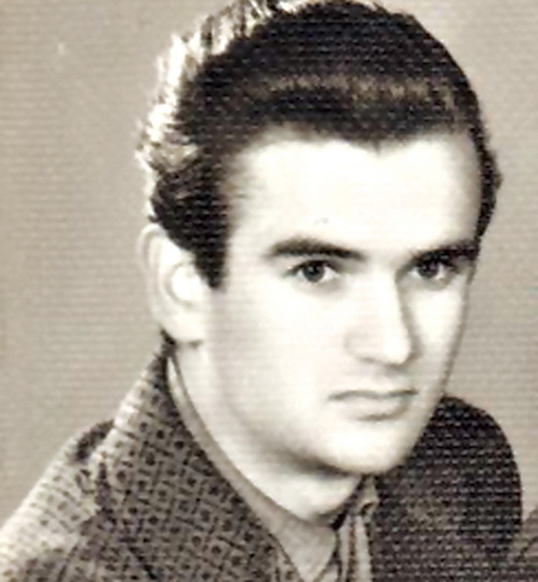
Radović as a young student

In Paris, Amfilohije studied at the Russian St. Sergius Orthodox Theological Institute, in Rome at the Pontifical Oriental Institute and in Bern at the Old Catholic Faculty. He completed his postgraduate studies in Bern and Rome, and then moved to Greece where he lived for seven years, took monastic vows (and monastic name Amfilohije, eng. Amphilochius) and worked as a hieromonk of the Greek Orthodox Church. In Athens, he completed his doctoral thesis on Saint Gregory Palamas and earned a doctor of theology degree. After spending one year at Mount Athos, he moved to Paris and worked as a professor at the St. Sergius Orthodox Theological Institute. In 1976 he became a docent and later professor of Orthodox catechesis at the Faculty of Theology in Belgrade. He was made an honorary doctor of the Moscow Theological Academy (2006) and of the Institute of Theology of the Belarusian State University (2008). He spoke Greek, Russian, Italian, German, French and used Old Greek, Latin and Old Church Slavonic. He was a member of the Association of Writers of Serbia and Montenegro.

=== Bishop of Banat (1980s) ===
Named Bishop of Banat in the 1980s, he held the title until the end of 1990. During the late 1980s, Amfilohije was one along of Serbian intellectuals at time involved in anti-Catholic speeches and accused the Roman Catholic Church and Croatians of endangering Serbs within Croatia. In 1990, Amfilohije became a candidate for Patriarch of the Serbian Orthodox Church (SOC). A week before political elections in Serbia, on 6 December 1990, Serbian President Slobodan Milošević attempted to get control of the SOC through supporting his preferred candidates such as Amfilohije for patriarch. Amfilohije did not succeed in getting many votes and as such did not make the final shortlist of candidates for the role. A few days later the elderly Danilo Dajković retired and in December 1990 Amfilohije was elected to succeed him as Metropolitan of the Metropolitanate of Montenegro and the Littoral, a position he held until his death. Guests that were present at his inauguration ceremony were Matija Bećković, Novak Kilibarda and Radovan Karadžić. The arrival of Amfilohije to his new role was greeted by numerous people that ranged from high ranking politicians to Serbian nationalists in Montenegro.

At Cetinje in December 1990 public protests by people against his appointment as metropolitan followed, due to the reputation of Amfilohije as a Serb nationalist and his denial of a separate Montenegrin identity.

=== As Metropolitan of Montenegro in the early 1990s ===
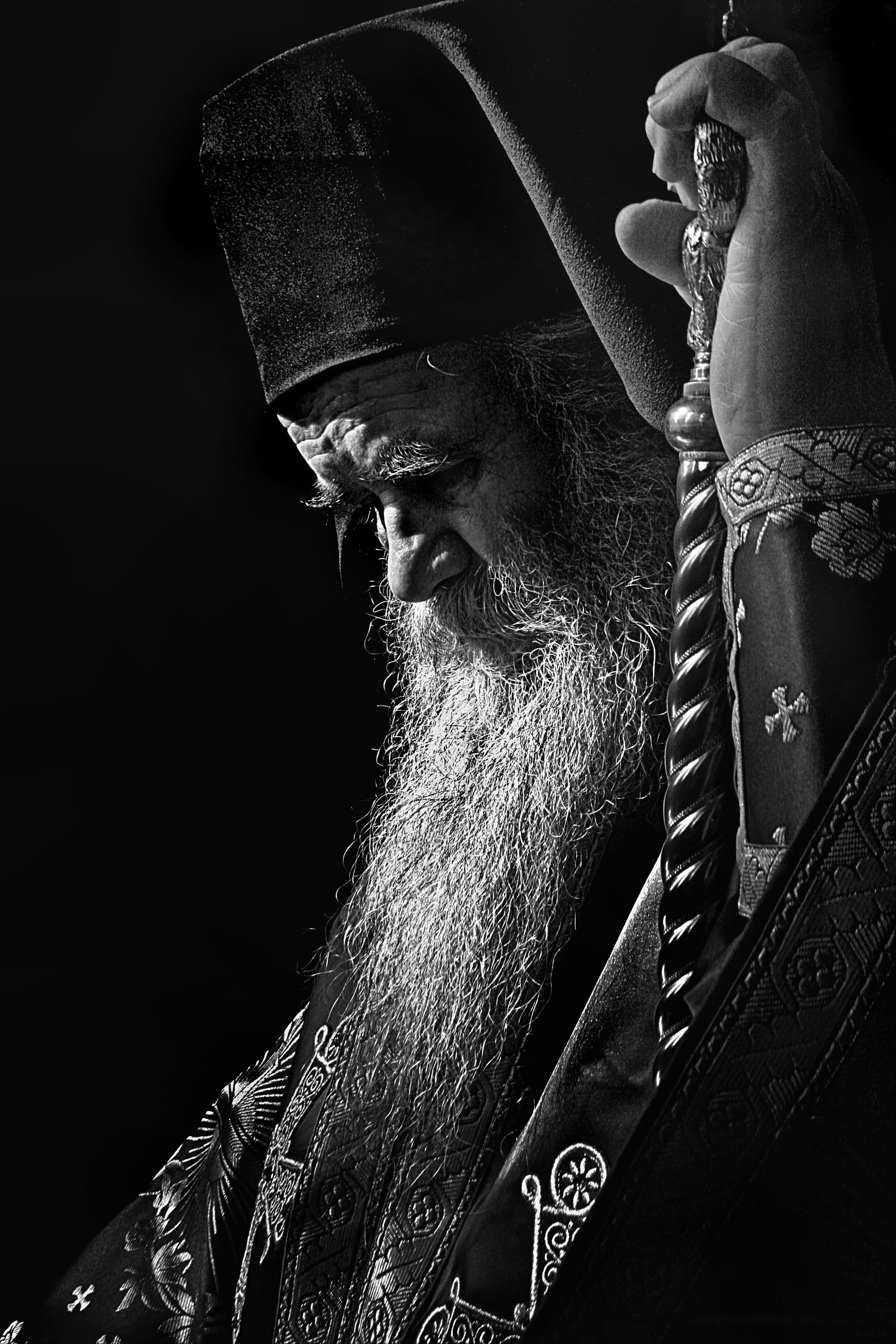
Metropolitan Amfilohije in 2008.

Amfilohije was elected Metropolitan of Montenegro in December 1990 and enthroned in the Cetinje Monastery on 30 December that year.

At the time, the Serbian Orthodox Church in Montenegro had re-emerged as a spiritual and political force following the fall of communism and the subsequent dissolution of the Socialist Federal Republic of Yugoslavia (1992). In his role as metropolitan, Amfilohije initiated a programme to construct new churches, monasteries and rebuild old churches. Other initiatives by Amfilohije resulted in more monks, nuns, priests and people into the church and an increase of Montenegrins baptised into Orthodoxy during a time when his relations with the Yugoslav Montenegrin government were strained. Relics from the bodies of saints were used to rally and to "re-Christianise" the population by the SOC such as those from St. Basil that were divided and later sent out to other monasteries in Yugoslavia. In Montenegro, new churches exhibited relics of martyrs that had died at the Jasenovac concentration camp to remind parishioners of the suffering that Serbs had undergone in the World War II. Amfilohije campaigned to rehabilitate Nikolaj Velimirović, an interwar Serbian Orthodox cleric imprisoned by the Axis powers during the World War II whom he viewed as a martyr.

In Cetinje, Amfilohije opened a new theological school, a publishing house known as Svetigora and a radio station called Radio Svetagora. Amfilohije was the main supervisor of his publishing house Svetigora.

In 1992, Metropolitan Amfilohije founded Svetigora, a periodical journal of the Serbian Orthodox Metropolitanate of Montenegro and the Littoral, which is still published monthly. Journal contains mostly the church teachings, poetry, lectures, spiritual lessons, reportages, news and chronicles from the Metropolitanate, the Serbian Church and the all other Orthodox churches. In 1998, Metropolitan Amfilohije also started nationwide radio station of the same name.

At the time his relations with the Montenegrin government were lukewarm and he lobbied for religious education by the Metropolitanate of Montenegro and the Littoral to be compulsory in schools.

More than 569 churches and monasteries of the Serbian Orthodox Church were built or reconstructed during his reign. During his thirty-year rule of the Eastern Orthodox Church in Montenegro, soup kitchens were opened in several cities in Montenegro, from which currently about 600 most vulnerable families get a hot meal, usually at home, every day, while the number of those receiving one-time food assistance is also large.

Amfilohije became a prominent advocate and supporter of Serbdom and was a self declared Serbian nationalist. His appointment as metropolitan coincided with the rise of Slobodan Milošević and the mobilisation of the Serb population in Yugoslavia that was supported by the SOC, along with an increase in Serbian nationalist sentiment. The SOC increasingly embraced a nationalist path, mainly by radical elements within its ranks as represented by the figure of Amfilohije. He and several other SOC bishops claimed that the responsibility of Yugoslavia's problems were based upon genocidal tendencies among Yugoslav ethnic groups and the West, with its modernity and ideologies such as communism, individualism, materialism and secularism. Amfilohije made comments on the situation in Kosovo and claimed that expansionist countries of the Catholic and Protestant West and Muslim East were "an insane wind trying ceaselessly to extinguish this sacred lamp", defined as Serbia.

As the Yugoslav Wars spread, Amfilohije along with other high ranking clerics strengthened their positions as the older generation of clerics and theologians that made compromises with the past Yugoslav communist government were sidelined. During this period Amfilohije made anti-Muslim and anti-Croat comments. In 1992, claims against Bosniaks, Croats and Albanians were made and repeated by high ranking Serb Orthodox clergy such as Amfilohije that the Serbs faced a genocide from them through a global conspiracy assisted by the Vatican City and Germany. In the early 1990s, Amfilohije and Bishop Vasilije Kačavenda deepened religious and ethnic divisions during the Yugoslav Wars and alleged that a global conspiracy existed against the SOC. Amfilohije stated that the "natural space" of the Serbs lay with the Orthodox East and that they needed to fight the Protestant and Catholic West and also Islam, as according to him "without death there will be no resurrection".

Amfilohije became a prominent contributor to debates regarding identity and sovereignty issues of Montenegro. A number of his views are on the statehood and nationhood of Montenegro and identity of Montenegrins which Amfilohije regards as being of Serb ethnic origin or the "best and purest Serbs" consisting of elements such as Kosovo, St. Sava and the Nemanjić dynasty. Other positions include that the Serb ancestors of the Montenegrins fled from the control of Islam to Montenegro and from there the Serbian nation had the opportunity to revive itself after the defeat suffered by Serbs at the Battle of Kosovo (1389). It led to strong disagreements with the Montenegrin government that over time favoured independence from Serbia. For Amfilohije the Montenegrin nation was invented by communists such as Tito and Milovan Đilas along with separatists supported by external forces that sought to separate Montenegrins from their historic origins and split Serbs within the wider region.

He viewed people advocating for the canonically unrecognized Montenegrin Orthodox Church (MOC) as "heretical and schismatic" that waged a campaign against the SOC and labelled Montenegrin autocephalists as "Crnolatinaši" (Black Latins), a derogatory expression used for dogmatic and fanatical Catholic clergy. Amfilohije stated that the MOC was a "political entity" and that Montenegrin autocephalists were "Titoists" and "godless" that came from "non-church circles" and an irreligious background.

The MOC attempted to characterise Amfilohije as a "dangerous fundamentalist" that wanted to impose the SOC upon all Orthodox Montenegrins and autocephalists viewed him as part of an "anti-Montenegrin" assimilation campaign. Protests by Montenegrin autocephalists were held against Amfilohije, sometimes in places when he was present such as at the inauguration ceremony for the Cathedral of Christ's Resurrection in Podgorica and the interruption of a conference of Montenegrin academia honouring Petar II Petrović-Njegoš. The Montenegrin opposition viewed Amfilohije and his supporters as agents of a "Greater Serbian project" and accused the metropolitan of wanting to maintain ecclesiastical control over all churches in Montenegro.

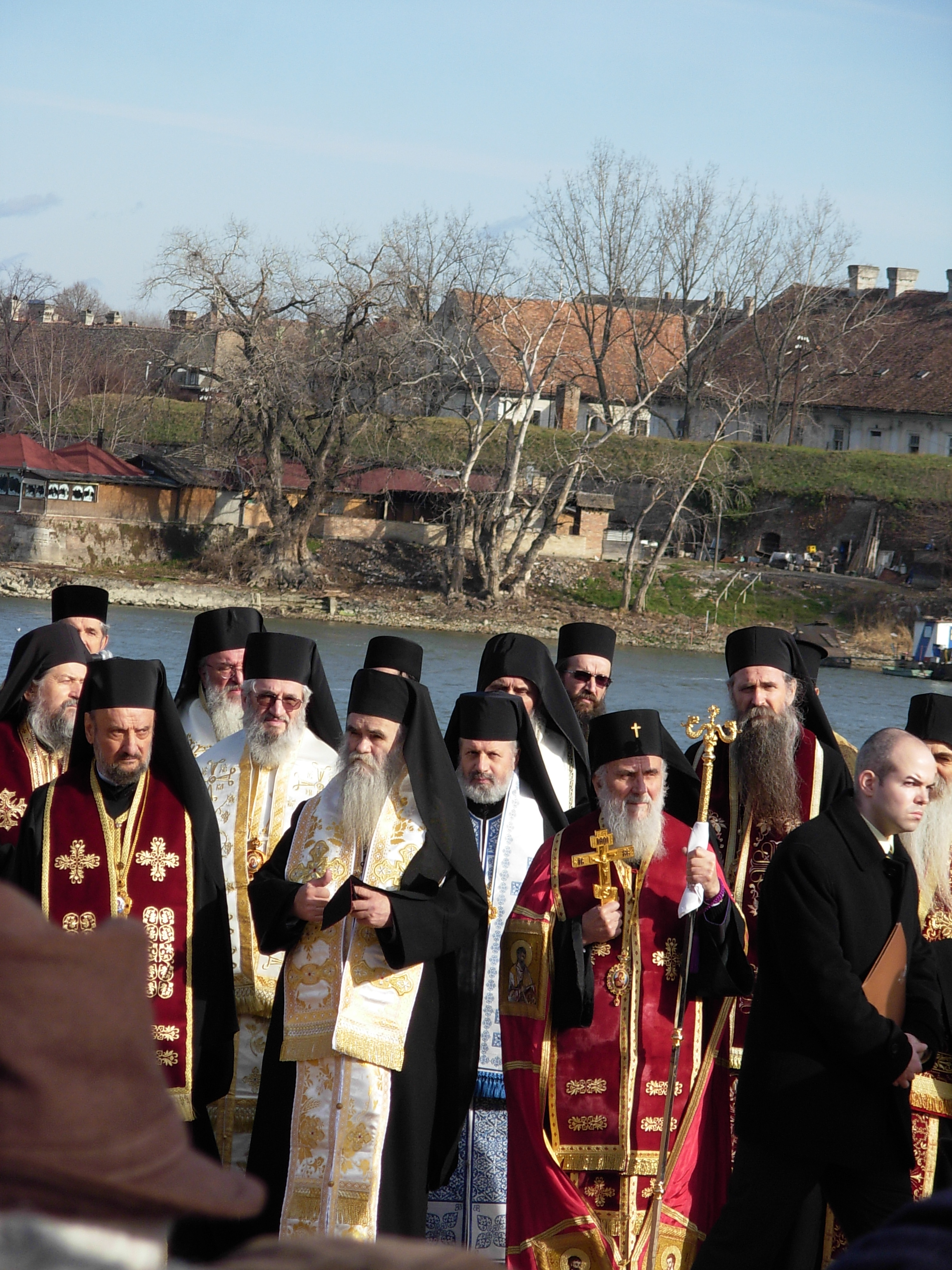
First row: Metropolitans Vasilije Kačavenda (in red, left), Amfilohije (in white, centre) and Patriarch Irinej (in red, right).

Early on Amfilohije supported Milošević, his policies and the Serbian nationalist standpoint during the breakup of Yugoslavia and wars that took place in Croatia and Bosnia. During a 1990 interview with Serbian newspaper NIN, Amfilohije stated that Milošević should be "commended" as he understood "the vital interests of the Serb people" and that "if they continue as they started, the results will be very impressive." In another interview with the foreign media Amfilohije said that the Kosovo jubilee of the late 1980s made Serbia demonstrate "a national unity, unseen probably since 1914." In comments made to a Kosovo Serb newspaper Jedinstvo in 1990, Amfilohije acknowledged the self determination of Slovenes and Croats to statehood and said the Serbs should do likewise adding that "reconciliation over the graves of innocents" was impossible "until the Croatian people renounce the evil".

In anticipation of an invasion by Yugoslav troops of southern Croatia, the SOC, represented on the ground by Amfilohije conducted a religious ceremony (17 February 1991) in a historic Orthodox church on the Prevlaka peninsula on the Croatia-Montenegro border. During the siege of Dubrovnik, Amfilohije played the gusle (a stringed instrument) and sang verses to Yugoslav Montenegrin troops from the epic poem "Battle of Mojkovac". He made many visits to Serb soldiers in Bosnia to give his support. Amfilohije often praised the wartime Bosnian Serb leadership such as Biljana Plavšić, whom he labelled the "Kosovo Maiden", and Radovan Karadžić. Amfilohije invited the Serb paramilitary leader Željko Ražnatović Arkan and his group the Tigers, a paramilitary group on two separate occasions to guard the Cetinje Monastery in 1991 and 1992. On the second of those visits during Orthodox Christmas Eve (1992), Montenegrin autocephalists had assembled at King Nikola's Square and Arkan with his Tigers were present at the monastery where Amfilohije told the gathered crowd that "Skadar would be Montenegrin again".

At the time Amfilohije was also involved as an arbiter in external and internal conflicts within and between Serbian political parties in Montenegro, Serbia and Bosnia and Herzegovina. During the war in Bosnia, Amfilohije in 1994 called for Republika Srpska, a Bosnian Serb self declared political entity to be supported. He was critical of what he viewed as Yugoslav government and European inaction toward Bosnian Serbs and the perceived danger they and the Orthodox faith in Bosnia faced from Muslim Bosniaks. Amfilohije maintained a strong relationship with the wartime Bosnian Serb leadership based in the town of Pale, Bosnia. He often visited Pale and told Serb troops to continue fighting. Amfilohije supported the decision by the wartime Bosnian Serb leadership to reject the Vance–Owen peace plan which proposed to divide Bosnia into multiple cantons. The relationship between Amfilohije and the Serbian President deteriorated after Milošević broke with the Bosnian Serb leadership, due to their rejection in May 1993 of the Vance–Owen peace plan. Amfilohije continued to support the wartime Bosnian Serb leadership and became a strong critic of Milošević and his policies. In 1995, with Serb forces losing ground in Croatia and Bosnia, Amfilohije addressed the Montenegrin parliament and called for them to abandon support for Milošević and to remove their sanctions against Bosnian Serbs.

=== Late 1990s and early 2000s ===
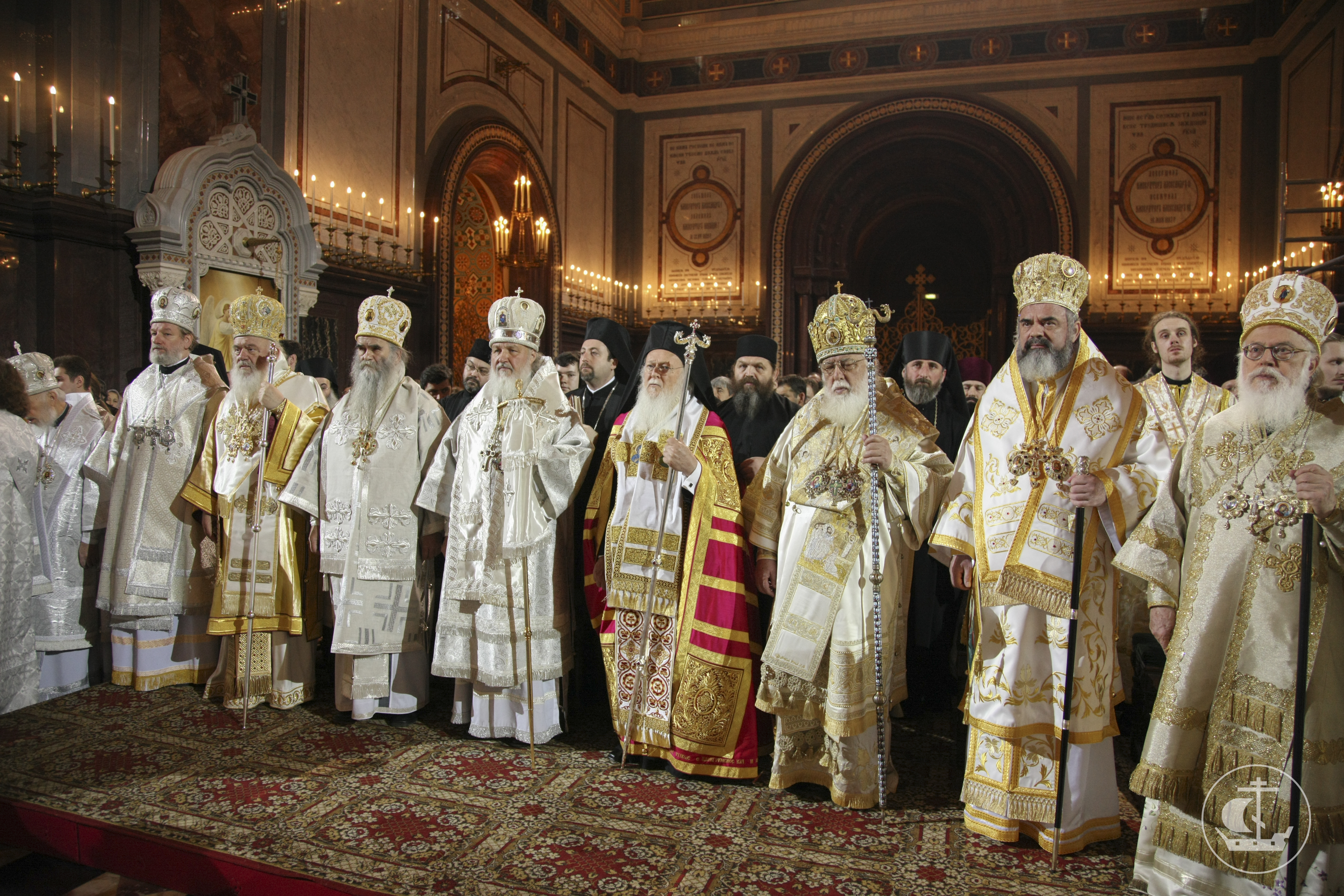
Gathering of global Orthodox clergy: Amfilohije (in white, fourth from left), Patriarch Bartholomew I of Constantinople (in white and red, centre).

Due to his opposition toward Milošević, Amfilohije for a short time found common ground with Milo Đukanović when in 1997 the Democratic Party of Socialists of Montenegro (DPS) became divided into pro- and anti-Milošević groups. Amfilohije gave blessings to Đukanović when he became Montenegrin president in January 1998. Over time, as Đukanović advocated for an independent Montenegro, a rift emerged in their relationship and Amfilohije became a strong critic of the Montenegrin president. Attempts to alleviate ecclesiastical tensions resulted in Đukanović and Prime Minister Igor Lukšić asking Amfilohije to become part of the MOC, a move that is unachievable as the MOC lacks recognition and is considered heretical by other Orthodox churches. In the late 1990s, Amfilohije, as head of the Montenegrin metropolitanate, was in charge of 160 clergy such as priests, monks and nuns that provided religious service to more than 90% of parishes and monasteries within Montenegro. In the mid-2000s, Amfilohije commented and made critical statements regarding the integration of Serbia into the European Union. Amfilohije opposed dialogue and was anti-ecumenical in relation to the Catholic Church. In the late 20th century, Amfilohije gave support to nationalists and radical anti-Westerners and in the early twenty first century he had devoted his efforts toward dialogue between the Orthodox and Catholic churches. During February 2003, Amfilohije was head of a SOC delegation that visited Vatican City and German Catholic media reported that he invited the Pope to Belgrade, later denied by the SOC. Exposed to Catholic influence, Amfilohije has shifted his position about the "evil essence" of people in the West and has begun to distinguish between a "bad" secular and "good" anti-secular Europe. Amfilohije has promoted and advocated for the concept of "theo-democracy" without going into the specifics of the idea as a possible opposition toward liberal democracy. Amfilohije's views remain distant from a liberal perspective and as such, Klaus Buchenau states, he cannot be labelled a "pro-Westerner". In 2005 Amfilohije urged Radovan Karadžić, who evaded capture from the ICTY indictment, to give himself up.

On 18 June 2005, a small corrugated iron church was placed by a helicopter atop the summit of Mount Rumija by the 172nd Airborne Brigade of the Serbian and Montenegrin Army of Podgorica at the request of the Council Church of Podgorica, a dependent of the Orthodox Serb Metropolitan of Montenegro. The symbolic action aimed at demonstrating the dominance of the SOC over other religions and to support the Serbian character of Montenegro, the event also revealed the close links between Amfilohije and the army. The SOC stated that a former church existed some 500 years in that location which was destroyed by the Ottomans. The action was criticised in Montenegro by public figures such as Andrej Nikolaidis who stated there never was a church in that location and Amfilohije received negative press from a part of Montenegrin media of appropriating the site for one faith to the exclusion of others and generating inter religious disharmony. In a letter addressed to Đukanović, Amfilohije stated that any removal of the church would be an act of vandalism.

=== After the independence of Montenegro (since 2006) ===
During the 2006 Montenegrin independence referendum, Amfilohije supported the continuation of Serbian–Montenegrin unionism and was an important figure in the campaign for unity. In Montenegro, Amfilohije was viewed as a more able articulator for the interests of Montenegrin Serbs than politicians of the time. Amfilohije protested an attempt in 2006 by the MOC to storm a church near Cetinje and stated that he thought the Montenegrin government were behind the actions of the MOC. A future unification of all Orthodox churches within Montenegro was opposed by Amfilohije. Montenegrin politician Ranko Krivokapić was a major rival of Amfilohije. During May 2011, Amfilohije was charged with hate speech and underwent a court trial in Podgorica, due to comments made toward people who wanted to remove a church located at Mount Rumija. The trial lasted until November 2012, where Amfilohije rejected the charges against him and later at the conclusion of his case he received a caution from the court. During 2013, Amfilohije attempted to have Petar II Petrović-Njegoš declared a saint, yet those efforts were opposed by Montenegrin authorities and the SOC synod. At the Cathedral of Christ's Resurrection in Podgorica, the image of Amfilohije is featured among the frescoes.

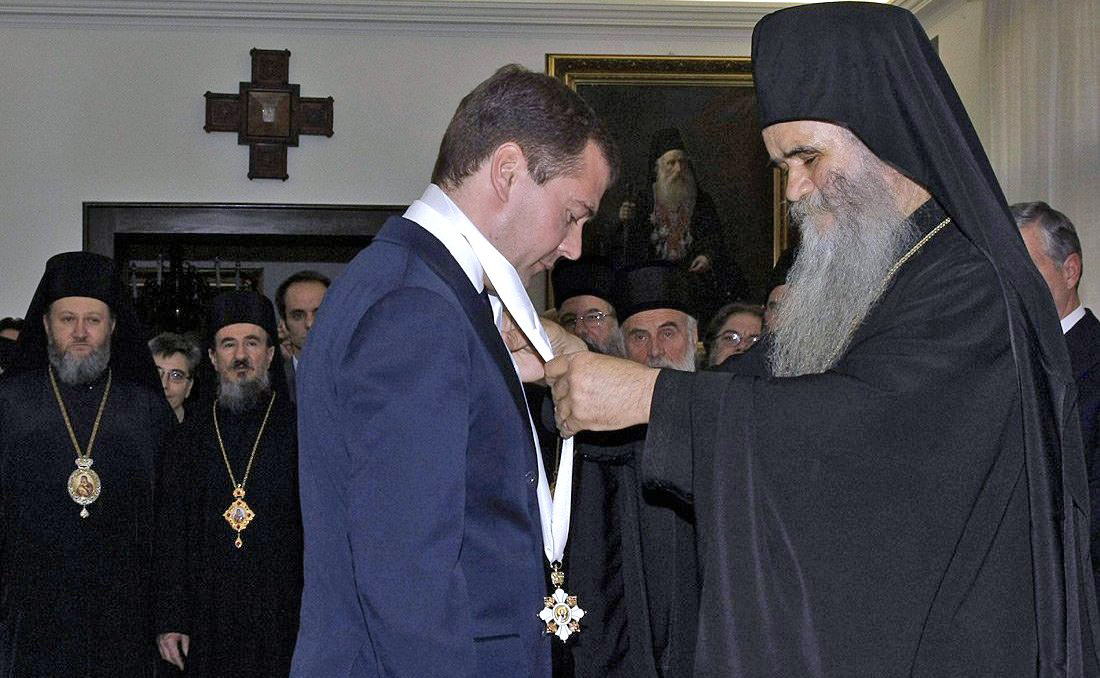
Dmitry Medvedev receives the Order of St. Sava from Metropolitan Amfilohije.

In 2008, Kosovo declared independence from Serbia and Amfilohije gave speeches where he stated that Kosovo was "Jerusalem, the cradle of the Serbian nation". At the time Amfilohije criticised the Serbian Foreign Minister Vuk Jeremić and President Boris Tadić as "traitors who did not want the army to defend Kosovo". Amfilohije also stated that Serbia needed to buy new weapons from Russia and get Russian volunteers to defend Kosovo. In March 2008, during the Serbian elections, Amfilohije backed the Serbian Radical Party (SRS) and Democratic Party of Serbia (DSS). On 13 November 2007, after Serbian Patriarch Pavle (1914–2009) had been transferred to a clinical centre due to his poor health, the Holy Synod of the SOC elected Radović to perform the duties of the patriarch. Patriarch Pavle died on 15 November 2009, and Amfilohije continued his role as the Guardian of the Throne. Amfilohije, portrayed as a compromise figure between nationalists and bishops, along with Vasilije Kačavenda and Irinej Bulović, was the main candidate for the SOC patriarch. He ceased to perform that duty after the election of Bishop Irinej of Niš as the new patriarch on 22 January 2010. His friends have claimed that he was happy not to be elected as a patriarch as there was "a lot of work to be done in Montenegro". On 2 August 2014, at a church gathering on Ilindan (St. Elijah's Day), Amfilohije stated that Muslims were "a false people with a false religion" and Islamic teachings a "spiritual death". He made comments on The Mountain Wreath, a 19th-century poem written by Petar Petrović Njegoš regarding what Amfilohije described as the "extermination of the Turkifiers". Amfilohije stated that killing people was "horrible, however more terrible is the spiritual death sown around by fake people with false faith." He further added that "Thanks to those victims, Bishop Danilo saved Montenegro. Otherwise, there would not have been a single Orthodox ear left in Montenegro."

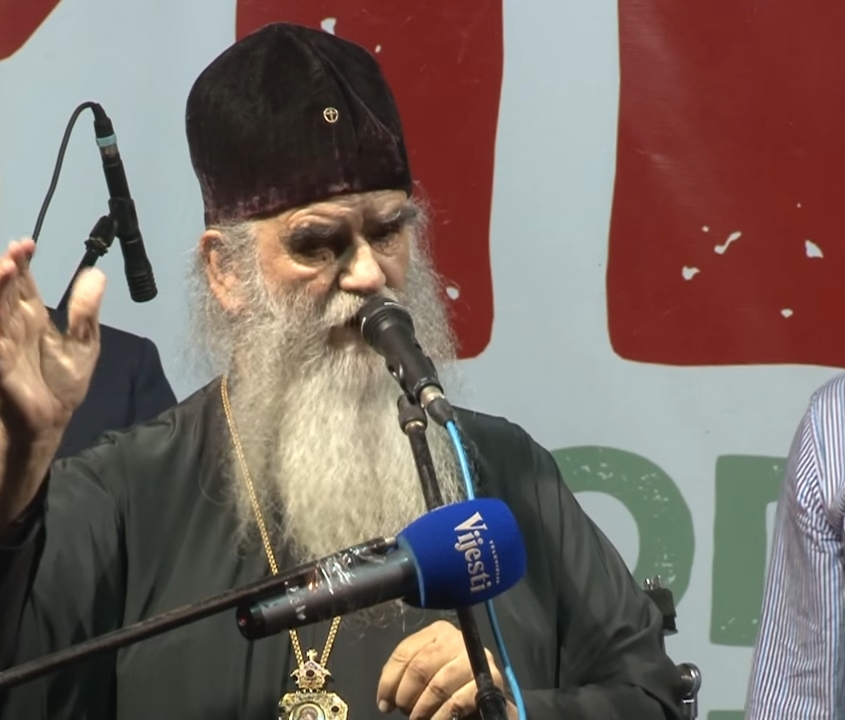
Amfilohije giving a speech at the anti-government rally in October 2015.

On 8 October 2014, at a church celebration in Kolašin, Amfilohije said "two evil and deadly diseases ravaged through this region, poturčenjaštvo and brozomora." The word poturčenjaštvo is in reference to Slavic people becoming Muslims or converting to Islam, the faith of the "Turks" (Ottomans) in the Ottoman era and brozomora (Broz disease) is in relation to acceptance of the communist ideology of Josip Broz Tito. Amfilohije also stated that the era under Tito resulted in the division of a unitary Serbian nation into four separate nations such as the "Bosniaks, Montenegrins and Macedonians". The Islamic Community responded by stating that Amfilohije's comments were "hate speech" and referred to the close relations the Church and Amfilohije had with combatants and their "crimes against humanity" during the Yugoslav Wars. Amfilohije was well known for his frequent statements against the LGBT rights and gender equality, and has been quoted calling the Pride a "parade of death, self-destruction, murder and homicide". He was also elected the Homophobe of the Year by the NGO Queer Montenegro in 2014. He was also publicly warned by the Ombudsman for hate speech and discrimination of the LBGT minority. Amfilohije had denounced NATO, calling it a "militaristic, totalitarian, terrorist, international organization". The SOC in Montenegro has called for a referendum on Montenegro's NATO accession. Anti-government protests had been held, organized by the Montenegrin opposition, made up of the mainly Serb community. Amfilohije had publicly criticized the country's "separation from mother Russia".

==== Controversial religion law and protests (2019–2020) ====
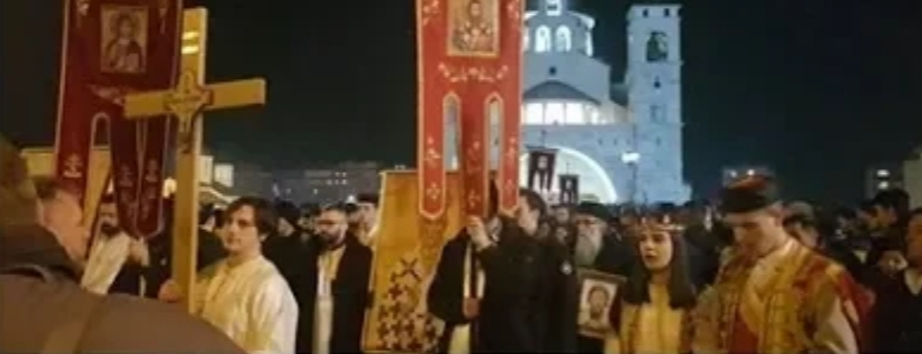
Protest prayer walks in front of the Cathedral of the Resurrection of Christ in Podgorica, on 26 January 2020.

As of late December 2019, the newly proclaimed Law on Religious Communities in Montenegro, which de jure transfers the ownership of church buildings and estates from the Serbian Orthodox Church in Montenegro to the Montenegrin state, sparked a series of large protests followed with road blockages. Some church officials were attacked by the police (including Bishop Metodije, Amfilohije's deputy) and a number of journalists, opposition activists and protesting citizens were arrested. On 29 December 2019, the Episcopal Council of the Serbian Orthodox Church in Montenegro excommunicated President of Montenegro Milo Đukanović and Government coalition MPs and officials for passing the religious law. Prayer walks continued into August 2020 as peaceful protest prayer walks, mostly organised by the Metropolitanate of Montenegro and the Littoral and led by Metropolitan Amfilohije in a number of Montenegrin municipalities. As time went on a considerable percentage of Montenegro's population took to streets opposing the law. During February peaceful public gatherings reached over 50 or even 60,000 attendees in Podgorica alone and they are increasingly described as the most massive public gatherings in the history of Montenegro. During peaceful protests in early 2020, more cases of police abuse of office and violence against protesting citizens and political activists were reported, several opposition activists and journalists were also arrested. At the parliamentary election in August 2020, Metropolitan Amfilohije supported the opposition candidates, going to the polls for the first time in his lifespan. The election resulted in a victory for the opposition parties and the fall from power of the ruling DPS, which had ruled the country since the introduction of the multi-party system in 1990. In September 2020, Montenegrin professor Zdravko Krivokapić, close to Metropolitanate of Montenegro and the Littoral and Metropolitan Amfilohije was selected new prime minister-designate of Montenegro by the new parliamentary majority, announcing withdrawal of the disputed law on religious communities.

=== Death and legacy ===
Metropolitan Amfilohije's grave in the crypt of the Podgorica Cathedral.

On 7 October 2020, Amfilohije tested positive for COVID-19 during its pandemic in Montenegro. He appeared to recover initially, and, on 20 October, tested negative for COVID-19. However, the situation worsened sharply on 29 October, when he developed shortness of breath. The head of the Pulmonology Clinic of the Clinical Center, Jelena Borovinić, stated on 29 October that the health condition of Metropolitan Amfilohije was difficult and that he was "placed in the mode of invasive ventilation". She explained that the deterioration of Amfilohije's health condition occurred after pneumonia developed, due to complications caused by COVID-19. He died on 30 October 2020 in Podgorica, Montenegro, at the age of 82.

Serbian Ambassador to Montenegro Vladimir Božović confirmed the media rumors that the Serbian government offered to transfer Amfilohije to Serbia for treatment, while the Metropolitan was treated at the local hospital in Cetinje, the Metropolitan thanked him and said he wanted to stay in Montenegro and share the fate of all other Montenegrin people.

Metropolitan Amfilohije was, at his own request, buried in the crypt of the Cathedral of the Resurrection of Christ in Podgorica in a resting place prepared for his lifespan. Amfilohije has begifted his personal library, consisting of several thousands books, to the medieval Stanjevići monastery. Noted Serbian poet Matija Bećković wrote a poem in his honour.

Despite to the Montenegrin government's bans on mass public gatherings due to the spread of COVID-19 virus, in front of the Podgorica Cathedral, there were thousands of believers present, as well as heads of the Orthodox Church in Serbia, Bosnia and Herzegovina, Greece, Ukraine and Albania, Roman Catholic Archdiocese of Bar and Islamic communities in Montenegro and Serbia, the funeral was also attended by a large number of political leaders from Montenegro and neighboring countries. Speeches at the funeral were given by Bishop Joanikije of Budimlja and Nikšić, Serbian Patriarch Irinej, Montenegrin Prime Minister-designate Zdravko Krivokapić, President of the Parliament of Montenegro Aleksa Bečić, as well as Serbian poet and Amfilohije's close friend Matija Bećković.

In a telegram of condolences, Belgrade Chief Mufti Mustafa Jusufspahić paid his respects to the late Metropolitan, recalling the events during the nationalist protests in Belgrade during May 2004, when the Bajrakli Mosque was attacked, and when only Metropolitan Amfilohije stood in front of the unbridled mass defending the sanctuary, "defending good from evil in all of us".

He donated his last pension to a poor priest who was working on several books in Belgrade.

Zdravko Krivokapić, the Prime Minister-designate of Montenegro, publicly asked the outgoing Government of Duško Marković to declare a day of mourning on the occasion of the death of the Metropolitan of Montenegro and the Littoral, which the government refused to do; meanwhile, several municipalities of Montenegro declared a day of mourning at the local level: Andrijevica, Budva, Berane, Kotor, Herceg Novi, Tivat and Plužine.

Serbian Patriarch Irinej tested positive for COVID-19 after attending, as well as presiding over, the open casket funeral for Amfilohije, which saw few among a large attendance, including the clergy who provided liturgy, wear safety masks. Those attending the funeral, which was held on 1 November, also did not keep their social distance and agreed to abide by the tradition of walking up to an open casket to kiss a deceased Eastern Orthodox cleric's hands and forehead. Irinej died 19 days after the funeral due to coronavirus, on 20 November.

== Public opinion ==
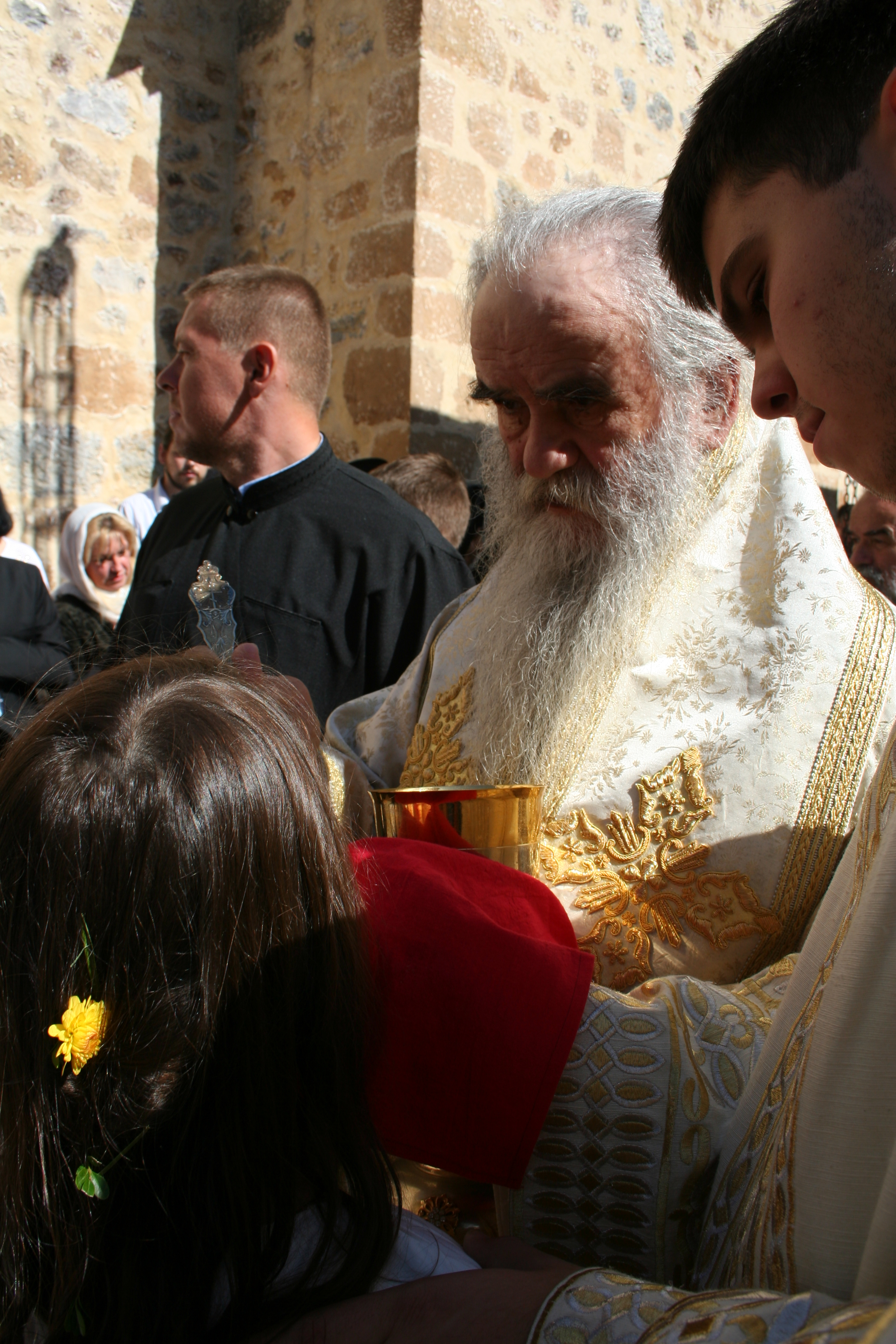
Amfilohije in 2017.

Amfilohije as a metropolitan understood Montenegrin sentiments and the social currents of Montenegro. He was a controversial figure that was respected by his clergy and disliked by some critics. Due to his status as a public figure, polarised public opinion over Amfilohije was either positive or negative. Among Montenegrin Serbs, Amfilohije was a popular figure and in polls conducted during 2003-2004 he ranked as one of the top trusted people in public life of Montenegro. As a divisive figure Amfilohije was portrayed by Montenegrin pro independence parties, some intellectuals and the MOC as a "war criminal" and "fundamentalist" causing conflict among fellow citizens. A cottage industry arose around criticising Amfilohije in the 1990s. The MOC has engaged in a public relations campaign aimed at what they considered to be the negative aspect of Amfilohije's character. Those efforts have included the MOC publishing a book by Vešeljko Koprivica about Amfilohije called Amfilohijeva sabrana ne djela (Misdeeds of Amfilohije) that attempts to portray the metropolitan as a Serb nationalist that stirred conflict during the breakup of Yugoslavia and its wars.

The role of Amfilohije in the political and social life of Montenegro has been denounced as a supporter of "militant Greater Serbian politics" and "ideas that lead to war" by his ideological opponents. In the rivalry between Amfilohije of the SOC and Metropolitan Miraš Dedeić of the canonically unrecognized MOC have often exchanged personal slurs and both have become representatives of the Serb and Montenegrin factions within the country. Supporters of Amfilohije are calling him "Đedo" (the Grandfather).

Amfilohije's supporters have claimed that more churches and monasteries have been built and rebuilt during his rule than during the Nemanjić dynasty.

== Awards ==
Selected orders and medals

- Commemorative Medal of Bartholomew I of Constantinople, 1991
- Medal of the Greek Orthodox Church of Jerusalem commemorating 2000 years of Christianity, 2000
- Order of Lomonsov, The national committee of state awards of the Russian Federation, 2001
- Medal of the Greek Orthodox Church of Jerusalem commemorating 1500 years of Mar Saba, 2002
- Order of Saint Alexander Nevsky, I Degree, Russian Academy of Military Science, 2003
- Order of the St. Cyril of Turov, Belarusian Orthodox Church, 2008
- Order of Saint Prince Vladimir, Ukrainian Orthodox Church, 2012
- Order of The Holy Great Martyr George, Eparchy of Budimlja and Nikšić, 2013
- Order of King Peter of the Society for Nurturing the Traditions of the Liberation Wars of Serbia until 1918, 2014
- Medal of Orthodox Spiritual Academy of St. Petersburg of Saint John the Apostle, 2015
- Order of the Montenegrin Grand Star, the state's highest order, posthumous, 2025
- Commemorative Medal of Vergina, Greece

Honorary degrees

- Moscow Theological Academy, 2006
- The Institute of Theology at the Belarusian State University in Minsk, 2008
- St. Sergius Orthodox Theological Institute in Paris, 2012
- Saint Petersburg Theological Academy, 2015

== Selected works ==
Amfilohije's bibliography consists of more than 1000 units and his selected works have been published in 36 volumes. Together with bishop Atanasije Jevtić, Amfilohije translated the Deuterocanonical books of the Old Testament to Serbian.

His selected works include

- Tajna Svete Trojice po učenju Grigorija Palame (1973),
  study in Greek, doctorate dissertation.
- Smisao liturgije (1974), study in Greek.
- Tumačenje Starog zaveta kroz vekove (1979), Belgrade.
- Sinaiti i njihov značaj u Srbiji XIV vijeka (1981), study.
- Filokalijski pokret XVIII i početkom XIX vijeka (1982), study.
- Osnove pravoslavnog vaspitanja (1983), studies.
- Duhovni smisao hrama Svetog Save (1987), Belgrade.
- Vraćanje duše u čistotu (1992), Podgorica
- Istorijski presjek tumačenja Starog zavjeta (1995), Nikšić.
- Sveti Petar Cetinjski i rat (1996), essay in edited book:
  The Lamb of God and the Beast from the Abyss

Selected translations (mostly from Serbian
to Greek and vice versa)

- Kasijana by Nikolaj Velimirović, 1973 (Serbian to Greek)
- Žitije Svetog Simeona i Save by Justin Popović, 1974
- Starac Arsenije Kapadokijski, 1987
- Od maske do ličnosti, 1993
- Premudrosti Solomonove (Wisdom of Solomon), 1995
- Azbučni Otačnik, 1995
- Knjiga Premudrosti Isusa sina Sirahova (Book of Sirach), 2007
- Eight deuterocanonical books of the Old Testament (Additions to Esther, 2 Esdras, Judith, Sirach, Baruch, Tobit, Letter of Jeremiah, Additions to Daniel), 2011-2012
- Mitropolit pergamski Jovan Zizjulas

== Sources ==
- Buchenau, Klaus (2014). "The Serbian Orthodox Church". In Leustean, Lucian N. (ed.). Eastern Christianity and politics in the twenty-first century. Routledge. ISBN 9781317818656.
- Šístek, František (15 September 2011). "Clericalization of Nationalism. Interpreting the Religious Rivalry between Serbian and Montenegrin Orthodox Churches, 1989–2009". Spaces and Borders. pp. 117–130. doi:10.1515/9783110228144.117. ISBN 978-3-11-022813-7.
- Stamatović, Aleksandar (1999). "Mitropolit Amfilohije Radović i naše vrijeme". Kratka istorija Mitropolije Crnogorsko-primorske (1219-1999) (in Serbian). Rastko.

Eastern Orthodox Church titles
Preceded by Visarion (Kostić)	Bishop of Banat; 1985–1990	Succeeded by Atanasije (Jevtić)
Preceded by Danilo (Dajković)	Metropolitan of Montenegro and the Littoral; 1990–2020	Succeeded by Joanikije (Mićović)
