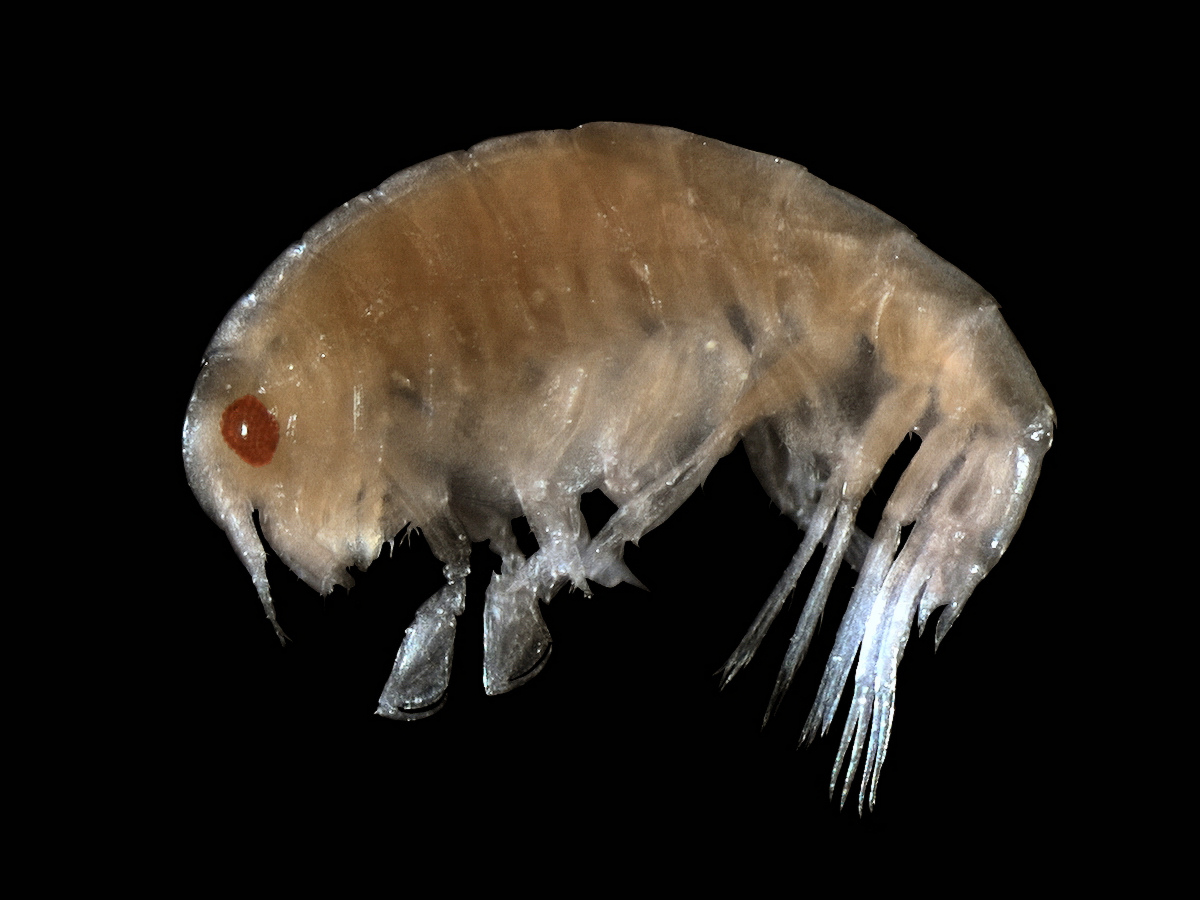
- Amphilochus neapolitanus

Scientific classification
- Kingdom: Animalia
- Phylum: Arthropoda
- Clade: Pancrustacea
- Class: Malacostraca
- Order: Amphipoda
- Superfamily: Amphilochoidea
- Family: Amphilochidae; Boeck, 1871

= Amphilochidae =

Family of crustaceans

Amphilochidae is a family of amphipod crustaceans, containing the following genera:

- Afrogitanopsis G. Karaman, 1980
- Amphilochella Schellenberg, 1926
- Amphilochoides Sars, 1895
- Amphilochopsis Stephensen, 1925
- Amphilochus Bate, 1862
- Apolochus Hoover & Bousfield, 2001
- Cyclotelson Potts, 1915
- Gitana Boeck, 1871
- Gitanogeiton Stebbing, 1910
- Gitanopsilis Rauschert, 1994
- Gitanopsis Sars, 1892
- Hourstonius Hoover & Bousfield, 2001
- Paramphilochoides Lincoln, 1979
- Paramphilochus Ishimaru & Ikehara, 1986
- Rostrogitanopsis G. Karaman, 1980
