= Amphilochius =

Amphilochius may refer to:

- Saint Amphilochius, 2nd-century Illyrian martyr
- Amphilochius of Iconium, 4th-century bishop and saint
- Amphilochius of Sida, 5th-century bishop
- Amphilochius of Pochayiv (Amfilokhiy; 1894–1971), Ukrainian Orthodox priest and saint
- Amphilochius of Montenegro (Amfilohije; 1938–2020), Serb Orthodox metropolitan

== See also ==
- Amfilochia, place in ancient and modern Greece
- Amphilochus (disambiguation)
- Saint Amphilochius (Konya), former church in present-day Turkey
