= Montenegrin Orthodox Church =

Religious organization

- Црногорска православна црква Crnogorska pravoslavna crkva
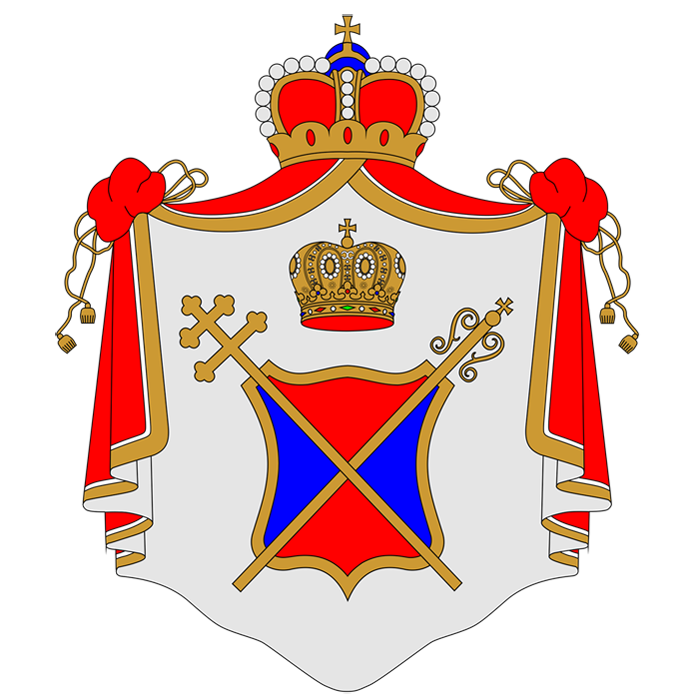
- Coat of arms of the MOC
- Abbreviation: MOC (English); CPC/ЦПЦ (Montenegrin)
- Type: Eastern Christian
- Classification: Independent Eastern Orthodox
- Scripture: Septuagint, New Testament
- Theology: Orthodox theology
- Polity: Episcopal
- Governance: Holy Synod of the Montenegrin Orthodox Church
- Metropolitan: Boris Bojović
- Language: Church Slavonic, Montenegrin
- Headquarters: Cetinje
- Territory: Montenegro
- Founder: Antonije Abramović
- Independence: c. 1993
- Separated from: Serbian Orthodox Church (1993)
- Members: 10% of Eastern Orthodox Christians in Montenegro (2020 est.)
- Official website: cpcniksic.me//

The Montenegrin Orthodox Church (MOC; Montenegrin: Црногорска православна црква, ЦПЦ, romanized: Crnogorska pravoslavna crkva, CPC) is a canonically unrecognized Eastern Orthodox church. Formed in 1993 and registered as a non-governmental organization, Antonije Abramović was appointed as its first metropolitan. In 2023, after some controversy, the current metropolitan, Boris Bojović, succeeded Miraš Dedeić in the role. It claims succession to an older autocephalous Montenegrin Church, which existed until the unification of the Kingdom of Serbia and Kingdom of Montenegro, later to join the Kingdom of Serbs, Croats and Slovenes in 1918.

The Montenegrin Orthodox Church has been recognized as a religious organization by the Government of Montenegro since 2001. According to a 2020 poll conducted by CEDEM, approximately 10 percent of Montenegro's Eastern Orthodox Christians have affiliated with the Montenegrin Orthodox Church, while approximately 90 percent have opted to stay with the Serbian Orthodox Church. Notably, the creation of the MOC has been opposed by the Ecumenical Patriarchate of Constantinople. Patriarch Bartholomew I has stated that "we will never give autocephaly to the so-called 'Montenegrin Orthodox Church'" and that its then-leader Dedeić was suspended by Constantinople for adultery and embezzlement.

== History ==
According to the Montenegrin Orthodox Church itself, the idea of an autocephalous, independent Orthodox church in Montenegro dates back to 1603, with claimed recognition from the Russian Orthodox Church and Ecumenical Patriarch of Constantinople in 1766. Some historians, such as Živko Andrijašević support this claim of a Montenegrin Orthodox Church having existed for hundreds of years before being forcibly absorbed by the Serbian Orthodox Church in 1920. However, this claim is contested by the Serbian Orthodox Church.

This notion of a free Montenegrin Orthodox Church was hardly discussed for many decades, but the creation of a special body for ethnic Montenegrins began to resurface outside Montenegro, at a time when Montenegrin fascists and collaborators led by Sekula Drljević gathered under the auspices of the Ustaša regime in the Independent State of Croatia. From 1943 to 1944, under the influence of the clerical-fascist ideology of the Ustaša movement, Drljević formulated a thesis on the diversity of Montenegrin Orthodoxy not only in relation to Serbian Orthodoxy, but also in relation to Orthodoxy in general. On that occasion, he coined the notion of crnogorоslavlje (Montenegrin Nationalism), putting it in opposition to svetoslavje. Looking at the Ustaša project of the Croatian Orthodox Church, Drljevic claimed that "the Montenegrin Church has not been in any dependence of any Orthodox Church for all centuries."

The Montenegrin Orthodox Church was founded in Cetinje on October 31, 1993, led by Antonije Abramović who was appointed as patriarch, initially with the support of the Liberal Alliance of Montenegro (LSCG), a pro-Montenegrin independence political party that existed at the time. At the time, Montenegro was part of the federal state with Serbia, the Federal Republic of Yugoslavia, which was formed a year earlier following a 1992 referendum. The Liberal Alliance of Montenegro, a party with a pro-independence agenda, is claimed to have used the MOC as a tool in their campaign for Montenegrin independence. At that time, the ruling Democratic Party of Socialists of Montenegro maintained close ties to Slobodan Milošević's administration in Serbia, and therefore the initial activities of the MOC were very sporadic.

After the death of Metropolitan Antonije, he was replaced by Metropolitan Dedeić. Most supporters of the Liberal Alliance of Montenegro disapproved of this change, and their support for the church soon started to fade. By 1997, the Democratic Party of Socialists' administration in Montenegro led by Milo Đukanović began to distance itself from Milošević, and started supporting and financing the church, which received support from both the Democratic Party of Socialists of Montenegro and the Social Democratic Party of Montenegro; however, after 2001 this support seemingly waned.

On January 17, 2001, the MOC was officially registered as a non-governmental organization at the local department of the Ministry of Internal Affairs. In the absence of any other relevant and more current pieces of legislation, the registration was based on the Law on the Legal Position of Religious Communities from 1977, when Montenegro was still a socialist republic within SFR Yugoslavia.

In 2007, the MOC attempted to expand its activities beyond the borders of Montenegro. Serbia originally denied the MOC registration as an organization, as all canonical Eastern Orthodox churches have also refused to recognize the MOC. However, on appeal, the Serbian Supreme Court ruled this position unconstitutional, overturning the refusal and paving the way for a potential permission to register.

The Montenegrin Orthodox Church has offered to issue baptismal certificates in which in the detail "ethnicity" would be changed to "Orthodox Montenegrin" instead of "Orthodox Serb".

On September 3, 2023, the 30th anniversary of the founding of the Montenegrin Orthodox Church, a major schism occurred when Bishop Boris Bojović was proclaimed the new Metropolitan. This decision was made by the MOC general assembly held in Cetinje, and was supported by a faction of younger priests loyal to Bojović, as well as hundreds of citizens gathered there. The assembly also declared the official retirement of former Metropolitan Dedeić, and proclaimed MOC founder and former Metropolitan Abramović a saint of the church. Dedeić sharply rejected the assembly’s declaration, calling it "a failed political rally," and stated "street rallies cannot change the metropolitan and elect a new one next to a living and healthy leader." In October 2023, Dedeić's proposal was rejected by the basic court in Cetinje that asked to prohibit Bojović from performing religious services in MOC churches.

On June 24, 2024, the Administrative Court of Montenegro released a decision ordering the Ministry of Justice and Human and Minority Rights to recognize Metropolitan Bojović as head of the Montenegrin Orthodox Church. This decision ended the ongoing administrative crisis resulting from the Ministry's refusal to register Metropolitan Bojović as the new leader. The court found ministerial rejection of the request was unjustified, taking into account religious autonomy of the church, and the invalidity of internal statutes that had not been officially promulgated. The new leader was elected in accordance with tradition at the General Montenegrin People's Assembly on September 3, 2023.

== Leadership and organization ==
At a General Montenegrin People's Assembly formed by the MOC in Cetinje on 6 January 1997, Metropolitan Mihailo was chosen by traditional public acclamation the Head of the Montenegrin Orthodox Church. In the Church of Saint Paraskeva in Sofia, he was ordained as bishop on 15 March 1998 by Bulgarian Alternative Synod leader, Patriarch Pimen and seven metropolitans and bishops of his synod. He was enthroned as Metropolitan of the Montenegrin Orthodox Church in Cetinje on 31 October 1998, before several hundred believers and supporters of Montenegrin Orthodox Church.

Metropolitan Mihailo had worked as a professor for the Serbian Orthodox Church and then as a priest of the Greek Orthodox Church in Italy, where he created a Serbian Orthodox municipality out of the Greek Church, leading after a number of scandals, including adultery and accusations of embezzlement, to his permanent suspension from the church in 1995. After becoming Metropolitan of the MOC in 1997, he was fully excommunicated by the Holy Synod of the Ecumenical Patriarchate of Constantinople from the Eastern Orthodox Church.

On 11 January 2007, the MOC created its own holy synod which proclaimed its first decree. This holy synod is constituted by archpriests of the church, led by the Metropolitan Archbishop of the Montenegrin Orthodox Church. This synod divided Montenegro in five eparchies: Cetinjska, Dukljanska, Primorska, Ostroška and Beranska.

As of 2024, the Montenegrin Orthodox Church is led by the Archbishop of Cetinje and Montenegro Metropolitan Boris (Bojović).

=== Within Montenegro ===
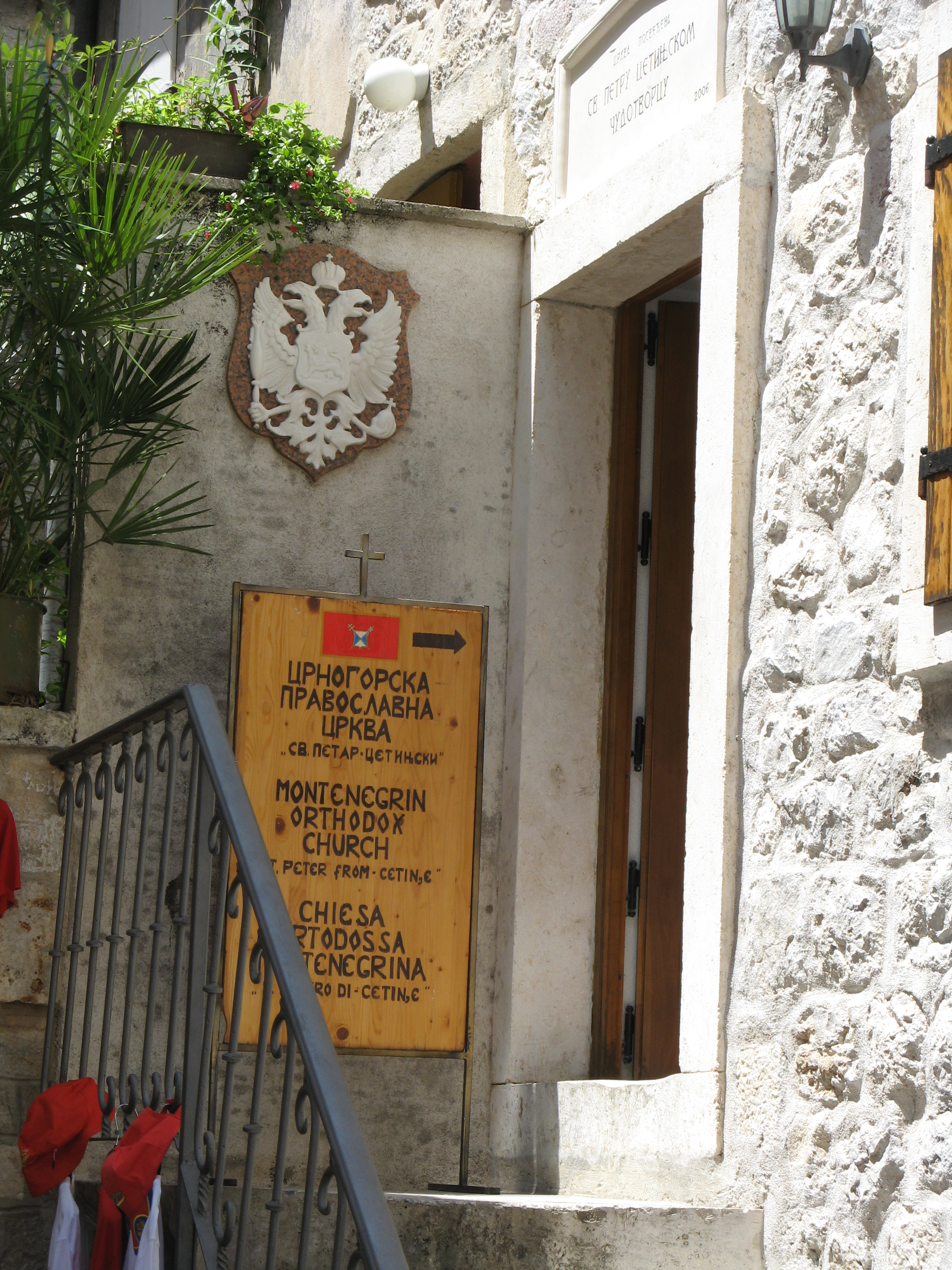
The Church of Saint Peter of Cetinje in Kotor, belonging to the Montenegrin Orthodox Church.

The Montenegrin Orthodox Church currently holds liturgies in several chapels in the royal capital of Cetinje, as well as a church in Kotor. Open-air services are held across Montenegro at Christmas and Easter. The MOC officially opened a new shrine in the old town of Kotor in 2006, following the referendum on independence.

=== Outside Montenegro ===
Construction on one of the first overseas MOC churches, the Holy Church of Righteous Ivan Crnojević, was planned to take place in Lovćenac, Serbia, with the help of the Association of Montenegrins in Serbia "Krstaš". A contract for the land on which the new MOC shrine will be built was signed on 5 August 2005.

The Montenegrin Orthodox Church also has support from abroad, and has managed to build several churches and missions in North America, South America, Australia, and Western Europe, which all host significant Montenegrin émigré communities who mostly support the Church. Services are held in the Australian state of New South Wales as well as in the Argentine province of Chaco, which is the base of Archimandrite Gorazd Glomazic and the Montenegrin Church of Saint Nikola in the colony of Machagai.

== Recognition ==
=== Support from other churches ===
The Montenegrin Orthodox Church has support from a number of likewise non-canonical or unrecognized Eastern Orthodox churches: the Ukrainian Orthodox Church – Kyiv Patriarchate, and its Italian-based branch, the Orthodox Church in Italy.

The MOC had original support of the then-unrecognized Macedonian Orthodox Church, which was later withdrawn as the Macedonian Church entered negotiations for restoration into communion and the defunct Bulgarian Alternative Orthodox Church (founded by Patriarch Pimen).

Following the granting of autocephaly to the Orthodox Church of Ukraine by Ecumenical Patriarch of Constantinople Bartholomew I, rumor spread that the Montenegrin Orthodox Church may soon receive a similar recognition; however, this was denied by Patriarch Bartholomew I, who stated that "we will never give autocephaly to the so-called 'Montenegrin Orthodox Church'" and that its leader Dedeić was suspended by Constantinople for adultery and embezzlement. In December 2022, Mihailo was granted an audience with then-Pope Francis at the Holy See.

=== Support from political parties ===
Political parties in Montenegro that so far officially stated support of the MOC have been: the Liberal Alliance of Montenegro and minority Croatian Civic Initiative, officially proposing it to be mentioned in the new Constitution of Montenegro, which eventually did not mention it upon adoption in late 2007. The Initiative invited representatives of both the Montenegrin and Serbian churches to a special municipal meeting in Tivat, sparking a boycott by local Serbian politicians.

During the occasion of 2008 Serbian elections, the church had the support of the Alliance of Vojvodina Hungarians which stated it should be a recognized religion in the country. After its 9th Congress, the Democratic Party of Socialists of Montenegro also endorsed the MOC as legitimate Church of Montenegro.

=== Public opinion ===
According to data from the Centre of Democracy in Montenegro (CEDEM), in 2007, the Serbian Orthodox Church was the most trusted institution in Montenegro by public opinion (coefficient 3.29), while the Montenegrin Orthodox Church was ranked sixth (coefficient 2.35). According to a 2020 poll conducted by CEDEM, approximately 10% of Montenegro's Eastern Orthodox Christians opted for affiliation with the Montenegrin Church, while approximately 90% chose or stayed with the canonical Serbian Orthodox Church.

== Claim to Serbian Orthodox churches ==
In April 2007 the "President of the Council for the Promotion of the MOC", Stevo Vučinić, was quoted as saying the "we [the MOC] will retake of all the churches and chapels in the towns, and of course the village churches, and the monasteries...we expect resistance, but in no case will we give up".

On April 18, 2007, the representatives of the Montenegrin Orthodox Church – which has announced that it did not wish to cause an "excessive situation", but that it would enter the Serbian Orthodox Cetinje Monastery without regard to the reaction of the Serbian Orthodox Church to their claims and requests attempted to do so. Special police units prevented their forceful entry and that of several hundred supporters of the MOC. There was some pushing and shoving between the police, and the crowd which had intended to force its way into the monastery. Following this, members of the crowd shouted slogans such as "This isn't Serbia", "Whose police are you?" and "Risto, Satan" (a reference to Metropolitan Amfilohije of the SOC).

In September 2008, Serbian Orthodox locals attempted to mount a blockade in the Nikšić area to prevent the MOC from building a church there. 65 were arrested for violating public order.

== See also ==
- Eastern Orthodoxy in Montenegro
