= The Lamb of God and the Beast from the Abyss =

Book of collected papers from a symposium

The Lamb of God and the Beast from the Abyss (Serbian: Jagnje Božije i Zvijer iz bezdana) is a 1996 book of collected papers from the second theological-philosophical symposium held during the Days of Saints Cyril and Methodius, containing contributions of twenty scholars and clerics, particularly from Montenegro, including Dr Radovan Karadžić. It "seeks primarily to justify the war in Bosnia and provide for a general ‘philosophical’ opposition to the anti-war literature published in Yugoslavia". It was edited by Rados M. Mladenovic & Hierodeacon Jovan and published by Svetigora, the publishing house of the Metropolitanate of Montenegro and the Littoral.

== Background ==
The second theological-philosophical symposium of the Serbian Orthodox Church was organized in 1996 by Amfilohije Radović Metropolitan of the Metropolitanate of Montenegro and the Littoral and Archbishop of Cetinje shortly after end of the wars in Croatia and Bosnia and Herzegovina. According to the publisher, "the writers of this book are sure that tragic defeat during these two wars is in reality a great victory which can have cosmic proportions".

== Writers ==
The book is a collection of 15 essays by, among others:

- Radovan Karadžić - leader of the Bosnian Serbs and indicted for war crimes by the International Criminal Tribunal for the former Yugoslavia (ICTY).,
- Amfilohije Radović - a senior member of the Serbian Orthodox Church and a former supporter of Karadžić
- Milovan Milutinović - former chief spokesman for the Bosnian Serb army
- Milutin Mićović
- Dr. Jovan Babić

== Content ==
The first section, titled 'And Holy and War' has two essays. In the first, Amfilohije Radović writes about how it is possible that Holy Peter who "was rightfully compared with Moses and Joshua" fought in three wars during his rule. The second part of the first section discusses the work of Velja Stanišić who created a poster for the "Bicentennial Anniversary of the Victory won by St Peter of Cetinje".

The first part of the second section, "War as experience" was written by Radovan Karadžić. In it, he asks "Was this a true War". In his essay, Karadžić argues that the Bosnian Serbs have been a hundred times victims whose enemies have killed all that is Serbian. Milovan Milutinović writes in his essay about war without a united program of Serbs west and east of the river Drina. In his words, the creation of Republika Srpska and Krajina by Serbian patriotic forces west of the Drina was necessary due to the extremist moves by Slovenian and Croatian secessionists; the Muslim-Croat coalition which wanted to become masters of the Serbs; strong anti-Serbian propaganda in the global media and others. He is satisfied with the organization of Serbian defensive forces west of the Drina, but not in the east. Milutinović ends his essay with the 1996 words of ICTY indictee Ratko Mladić: "We have been without a united Serbian national program, aim or strategy". Subsequently, Tihomir Burzanović discusses Ustaše crimes in 1942 and modern crimes against the Serbs of Bosnia. Regarding events during the Yugoslav Wars, he writes about the alleged crimes of Naser Orić, commander of Bosnian Muslim forces in Srebrenica from 1992, while the city was under siege from Bosnian Serb forces, whose ICTY conviction was overturned on appeal and similar crimes of Croatian and Bosniak forces. In his essay, the writer does not speak about Croats or Bosniaks, but about Ustaše and Muslims. The final essay of this section, by Mladen Šukalo, is about the alleged 'double standards' used by the international media.

The third section is called War as a lie and discusses the "lies and deception the protectors of the secessionist republics which have succeeded in isolating the Serbian people from the rest of the world". The first essay, written by Serbian Orthodox priest Atanasije Jevtić is speaking about is speaking how Serbs have fought always only defensive wars and that Croatian Dalmacija and Dubrovnik are in reality Bosnia and Herzegovina coasts and after that he is attacking dictator and traitor Slobodan Milošević which has given Krajina to Croatia and parts of Republika Srpska to Federation of Bosnia and Herzegovina. Last of his comments is about Western powers which have destroyed Yugoslavia in similar way like UK which has earlier destroyed Cyprus. In second essay of this section Mirko Zurovac of Belgrade university is speaking how western powers have destroyed Yugoslavia and then together with UNPROFOR helped Croatian and Muslim (Bosniaks) military forces. Author of this text is writing short history of events so that reader can better understand that Serbs are victims of genocidal war supported by NATO. 3rd essay is speaking about Microsoft Encarta 1996 which is in writer words biased against Serbs. Last essay in this section is speaking why this war is worst of all wars. In writer thinking this is not because number of victims, but because of number of lies which are created in world lies factory (Hollywood) to be used against Orthodox world. Roots of this hate in author words it is possible to find in the Rolling Stones song "Sympathy for the Devil"

4th section called Ethics, right and war is speaking about courts for war crimes. In first essay Dr. Jovan Babić from the University of Belgrade Faculty of Philosophy is speaking about moral legality of courts (ICTY ?) which will give penalty for defenders of status quo ante (Serbs) and rewards for secessionists (Bosnia and Hercegovina, Croatia) and for other examples he is using US war crimes in Vietnam and soldiers like James Duffy which will never see court for war crimes. Second essay is speaking about morale which is betrayed, abandoned during war. In last essay of this section Mr. Petar Bojanić is using like example correspondence between Norberto Bobbio and Carl Schmitt for statement that price for defeat is never small.

5th section called Soul and War it is written by Bosko V. Popovic and Dr. Jovan Mirić from Philosophical faculty in Belgrade. First essay called Psychological interpretation of War is speaking about psychology of war and human nature. In essay Popovic is speaking about James's study "Moral Equivalents of War", Pitirim Sorokin, Zontanon Colon and other scholars. On other side Mirić in his essay called The Wars in the Kingdom on Earth psychological interpretation of the answer given to the question of causes of war and for that he is using old Serbian folkloric poetry

6th section called People and War is having 3 essays. First called Serbs and War is speaking about stereotype that Serbs are war loving nation and how they have been trapped by Yugoslav idea in 1918 and 1945, but they have refused to be trapped in 1991. Second called Nationalism and War three types of concept concerning the determination of the national: the Romanic, Germanic and Slavic. Last essay in this section called Eastern Orthodoxy and War is speaking present historical and spiritual-political situation of Orthodoxy. Matej Arsenijevic is saying that it is not accident that first intervention of NATO has been against Orthodox Serbs. In his words Serbs question is in center of battle for Euro-Asian history and in center of Geopolitical games.
