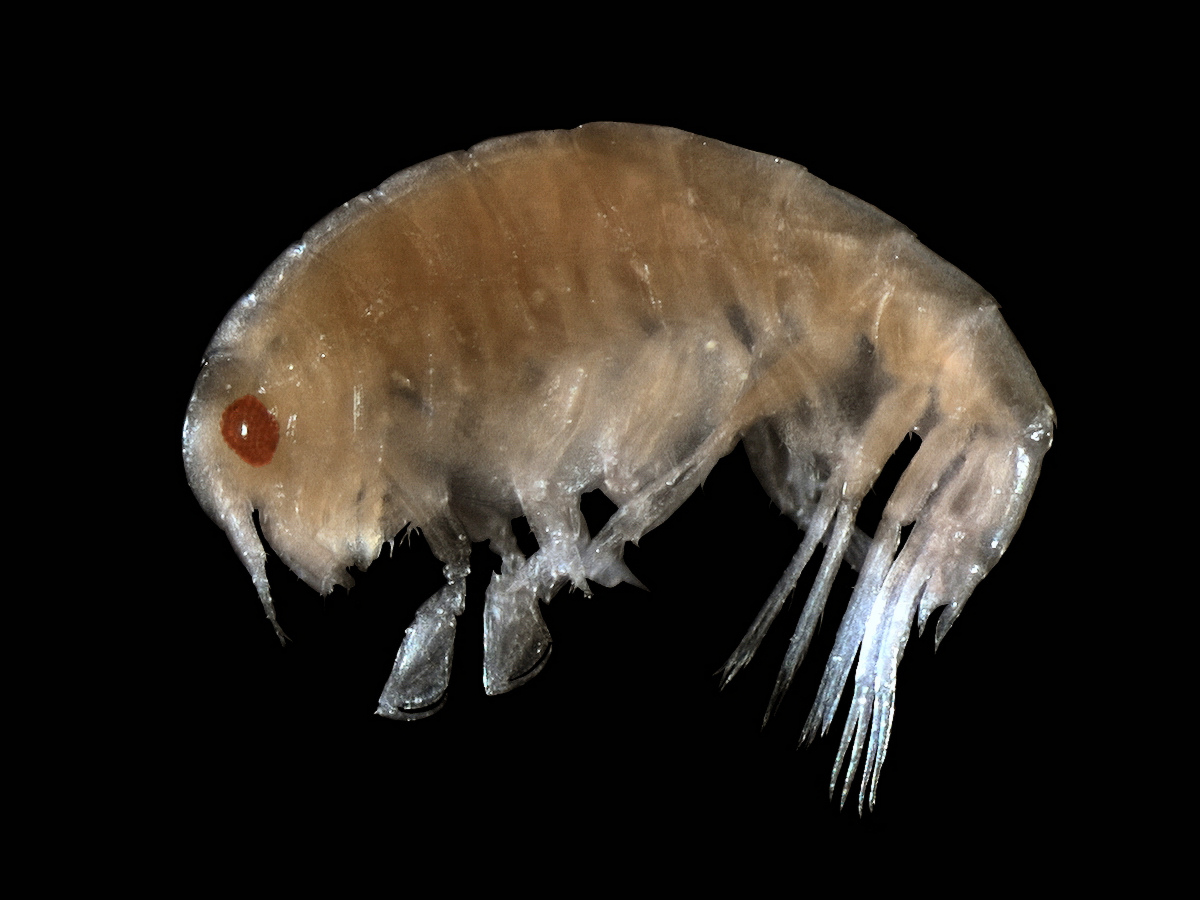

Scientific classification
- Domain: Eukaryota
- Kingdom: Animalia
- Phylum: Arthropoda
- Class: Malacostraca
- Order: Amphipoda
- Family: Amphilochidae
- Genus: Amphilochus
- Species: A. neapolitanus

Binomial name
- Amphilochus neapolitanus Della Valle, 1893

= Amphilochus neapolitanus =

Species of crustacean

Amphilochus neapolitanus also known as “algae louse” is a species of amphipod crustacean up to 4 millimetres (0.16 in) long. It lives at depths of up to 80 metres (260 ft) throughout the Mediterranean Sea and Black Sea, and in parts of the eastern Atlantic Ocean from the North Sea to North Africa. It is usually found on rocks among algae, where it feeds by grazing.
