= Antonije Abramović =

Eastern Orthodox archbishop (1919–1996)

His Beatitude Antonije
- Archbishop of Cetinje and Metropolitan of Montenegro
- Native name: Антоније
- Church: Montenegrin Orthodox Church
- Installed: 31 October 1993
- Term ended: 18 November 1996
- Predecessor: Position established
- Successor: Mihailo

Personal details
- Born: Ilija Abramović; 16 July 1919 Orahovac, County of Kotor, Kingdom of SCS
- Died: 18 November 1996 (aged 77) Podgorica, Montenegro, FR Yugoslavia
- Denomination: Eastern Orthodoxy

Antonije Abramović (Montenegrin Cyrillic: Антоније Абрамовић; 16 July 1919 – 18 November 1996) was an Eastern Orthodox archimandrite, who became the first primate of the canonically unrecognized Montenegrin Orthodox Church, serving from 1993 to 1996. He was styled as His Beatitude the Archbishop of Cetinje and Metropolitan of Montenegro.

== Early life ==
Antonije was born Ilija Abramović in Orahovac, near Kotor, on 16 July 1919. His father had recently moved to the Bay of Kotor from the Bjelice tribe in Old Montenegro. His mother was from the town next to Orahovac, Dobrota. After graduation from junior gymnasium in Kotor in 1935, Abramović became a novice at Praskvica Monastery.

== Monastic life at Visoki Dečani ==
He stayed at Praskvica until 1937, at which time he transferred to Visoki Dečani, where he completed the monastic school in 1941. The abbot there at the time was Dionisije Milivojević, who was elected Bishop of North America by the Serbian Orthodox Church in 1939 and was sent to the United States to take up his post in 1940.

Antonije remained at Visoki Dečani throughout World War II, surviving at least one major raid by the Balli Kombëtar. He was ordained to the priesthood and became a hieromonk in November 1941 in the Cathedral of Saint George in Prizren. Abramović was tonsured to the little schema in April 1943 in Dečani and took on the name of Antonije, in honor of St. Anthony of Rome. He was elevated to the title of hegumen in August 1950 in Dečani. Concurrently, Abramović enrolled at the Prizren Seminary in 1947 and graduated in 1951.

== Career in the SOC and contact with the Yugoslav state apparatus ==
From October 1955 to January 1956, Abramović was the acting abbot of the Patriarchate of Peć monastery. In 1957, he studied a theological course in New York City at the invitation of the dissident Metropolitan Leontius Turkevich, during which he performed priestly service at a church in Syracuse. During this time, he was entering financial hardships and the State Secretariat for Foreign Affairs wrote to the Religious Commission of the Federal Executive Council (SIV) in May 1957 requesting that he be awarded a monthly stipend of $75–100 due to his "useful and positive attitude about our country" which would be "useful for keeping contact with protestants and other religious groups in America".

After that, he was the abbot of Rakovica Monastery until July 1959, when he became the abbot of Savina Monastery in his native Metropolitanate of Montenegro and the Littoral. Soon after the consecration of the new Metropolitan of the Metropolitanate of Montenegro and the Littoral, Danilo Dajković, in December 1961, Abramović was transferred to the Eparchy of Banja Luka where he became the abbot of Moštanica Monastery.

== Service in the Orthodox Church in America (Metropolia) ==
In mid 1962, Abramović left socialist Yugoslavia for Greece, and from there emigrated to Canada a year later. He settled in Montreal, where he was received into the Diocese of Canada of the Russian Orthodox Church in America, then known informally as the Metropolia. He was offered the position of assistant to the parish priest of St. Peter and St. Paul Russian Orthodox Church on Champlain Street.

At that time, Bishop Dionisije Milivojević went into schism with the SOC and immediately recruited Antonije. Dionisije made him a parish priest in New Jersey in 1963, and he stayed there for less than a year before he was forced to return to Montreal. He was again received by the St. Peter and St. Paul Russian Orthodox Church on Champlain Street. After his return to Montreal, Bishop Sylvester Haruns sent him sometimes to serve in Saint Seraphim's Church in Rawdon, Quebec.

In June 1968, Abramović contacted the Metropolitanate of Montenegro and the Littoral led by Metropolitan Danilo Dajković. He requested that he be allowed to perform service at Savina Monastery, and Dajković promised to allow it if Abramović could present the approval of his superior, Bishop Sava Vuković. However, Sava replied that Abramović had followed the schismatic Bishop Dionisije, and was currently part of a Russian church. The SOC retracted their promise.

After 1970, Abramović, now elevated to the dignity of archimandrite, also was sent to Ottawa, Ontario, in order to serve at the Russian Orthodox Church of Saint Nicholas. Abramović retired as an archimandrite. In January 1993, he was recalled from retirement by Bishop Seraphim Storheim of Canada and appointed to serve as a priest in Montreal. In July 1993, Bishop Seraphim wrote to Abramović to inform him that he was to be appointed Bishop's Vicar for monasticism in Canada effective 1 August 1993, but by that time he was already set to return to Montenegro.

== Leadership of the Montenegrin Orthodox Church ==
In October 1993, archimandrite Abramović arrived in Montenegro, responding to the invitation of several groups and organizations, including the Liberal Alliance of Montenegro. His intention to support the proclamation of an independent Montenegrin Orthodox Church became known to the leadership of the Serbian Orthodox Church. Learning that Abramović was a cleric of the Orthodox Church in America, the superior of the Belgrade metochion of the Russian Orthodox Church contacted the Primate of the OCA, Metropolitan Theodosius Lazor, on 27 October 1993 telling him that the autocephalists in Montenegro represented "a party of liberals, former communists and Albanians (both Catholic and Muslim)". Theodosius acted swiftly and on 29 October Abramović was suspended from all priestly functions. Theodosius denied that the episcopal see of "vicar bishop of Edmonton" that Abramović had claimed existed. He was recalled to Canada and told to meet his superior, Bishop Seraphim Storheim, in Ottawa to explain himself.

In spite of that, Abramović was elected as the first head of the newly proclaimed Montenegrin Orthodox Church, at an ad hoc meeting held by his supporters on 31 October 1993 in Cetinje. He was issued a charter by the Committee for the Restoration of an Autocephalous Montenegrin Orthodox Church, signed by its president Dragoje Živković. The Committee denied the validity of Metropolitan Theodosius' fax and claimed it was really sent from Kotor by rector of the Cetinje Orthodox Seminary Momčilo Krivokapić.

On 13 November, the state-owned daily Pobjeda published an official statement by the Ministry of Internal Affairs (MUP) stating that the State Security Service (SDB) had information on Abramović's "lewd activities, based on the statements of the persons injured and findings of medical facilities", and alleged he was left unprosecuted and given the right to leave the country because of his ties to the SDB at the time. The MUP described a police interview they held in the lead-up to the meeting in Cetinje with Bobo Bogdanović, a representative of the committee, and Abramović. They stated that they "thought it was only fair to let Mr Abramović know that this information and these documents were known not only to the SDB, but to the people that sustained not only injuries but violations of dignity from these acts, before he accept any public position". They denied Bogdanović's claim that Abramović was pressured or that he was threatened with liquidation. There is no substantial proof that Abramović was a homosexual, despite these allegations and it being "common knowledge" within the SOC.

On 25 November, the SOC wrote to Metropolitan Theodosius that, despite his suspension, Abramović continued to present himself as vicar bishop, presenting a letter of support from archpriest John Tkachuk, the validity of which the SOC put into question, and continued to perform baptism in Montenegro. On 30 November, Metropolitan Theodosius informed the SOC as well as Ecumenical Patriarch of Constantinople Bartholomew I that the "elderly and deluded" Abramović "was falsely representing himself as an auxiliary (Vicar) bishop of Edmonton (Canada)" since he "was never consecrated" as such. He began the canonical process to formally depose Abramović from the clergy.

Abramović went to Canada, but returned to Montenegro on the eve of Orthodox Christmas on 6 January 1994. This decision was controversial, and the General Secretary of the Committee for the Restoration of an Autocephalous Montenegrin Orthodox Church Stevo Vučinić was opposed, considering it imperative to try to avoid Abramović's deposition from the clergy of the OCA. He blamed Bobo Bogdanović and considered bringing Abramović to Cetinje while his position in the OCA was in jeopardy an attempt to score "cheap political points". Leader of the Liberal Party of Montenegro Slavko Perović had a similar stance on the issue, which he stated in an open letter printed in the party newspaper Liberal on 9 January.

On 17 February 1994, Serbian Orthodox Bishop of Canada Georgije Đokić wrote to the OCA with the information that, despite his suspension, Abramović continued to serve as a priest at the St. Peter and St. Paul Church in Montreal. After initial denial, the OCA found that Archbishop Sylvester Haruns had indeed allowed Abramović to serve the Paschal Vigil. He was declared to be self-deposed by the Holy Synod of the Orthodox Church in America, effective 1 May 1994.

After this, Abramović traveled with Bogdanović and Vučinić to Skopje to try to convince the then canonically unrecognized Macedonian Orthodox Church to consecrate him as a bishop. They rejected out of fear of direct confrontation with the SOC. In late 1994, Abramović repeatedly announced he would be consecrated by an unnamed canonical church.

The Serbian Patriarch Pavle wrote to the OCA on 17 February 1995 stating that Abramović continued to appear wearing archbishop's ornate, was performing baptism in Montenegro, was trying to convince the clergy of the SOC to join the MOC and was searching for someone in the world who would proclaim him bishop. Metropolitan Theodosius wrote to Pavle telling him that Abramović was excommunicated on 22 March at the spring session of the Holy Synod of Bishops of the OCA meeting in Oyster Bay Cove, New York and was given a judgment of "complete expulsion from the Church".

In spite of this, Abramović continued his service as the head of the Montenegrin Orthodox Church. He wrote to Prime Minister Milo Đukanović setting out the historical claims of the church in June 1996. Soon after, however, Abramović fell into ill-health and his activities were much limited.

== Death ==
On 3 November 1996, Abramović sustained a heart attack. He died on 18 November of the same year in Podgorica and was buried in Cetinje. Abramović was succeeded by Mihailo Dedeić in 1997.

== Legacy ==
The emergence of the Montenegrin Orthodox Church in 1993 was seen by researches as an indicative part of wider ethnoreligious and political processes that were occurring in Montenegro after the breakup of former Yugoslavia.

Media in Serbia have accused the government currently in power, headed by Milo Đukanović, of planning to "rob" the Serbian Orthodox Church in Montenegro of its assets, and hand them over to the minor and unrecognized Montenegrin Orthodox Church. The SOC is the largest denomination in multi-ethnic Montenegro, but its relations with the pro-Western government have always been poor. The government considers the Church hostile to the independence of the country, and generally too pro-Serbian and pro-Russian. The Church accuses the government of trying routinely to undermine it and strip the country of its Serbian heritage.

== See also ==
- Montenegrin Orthodox Church
- Miraš Dedeić

== Sources ==
- Aleksić, Budimir; Krstajić, Slavko (2005). Trgovci dušama – dukljansko-montenegrinski vjerski trafiking u svjetlosti dokumenata (in Serbian). Nikšić: Omladinski intelektualni centar.
- Buchenau, Klaus (2014). "The Serbian Orthodox Church". Eastern Christianity and Politics in the Twenty-First Century. London-New York: Routledge. pp. 67–93. ISBN 9781317818663.
- Cattaruzza, Amaël; Michels, Patrick (2005). "Dualité orthodoxe au Monténégro". Balkanologie: Revue d'études pluridisciplinaires. 9 (1–2): 235–253.
- Džankić, Jelena (2016). "Religion and Identity in Montenegro". Monasticism in Eastern Europe and the Former Soviet Republics. London-New York: Routledge. pp. 110–129. ISBN 9781317391050.
- Morrison, Kenneth (2009). Montenegro: A Modern History. London-New York: I.B.Tauris.
- Morrison, Kenneth (2018). Nationalism, Identity and Statehood in Post-Yugoslav Montenegro. London: Bloomsbury Academic. ISBN 9781474235204.
- Morrison, Kenneth; Čagorović, Nebojša (2014). "The Political Dynamics of Intra-Orthodox Conflict in Montenegro". Politicization of Religion, the Power of State, Nation, and Faith: The Case of Former Yugoslavia and its Successor States. New York: Palgrave Macmillan. pp. 151–170. doi:10.1057/9781137477866_7. ISBN 978-1-349-50339-1.
- Rašović, Vojislav, ed. (2006). The Album of Memories: Canadian-Montenegrins. Toronto: Montenegrin Cultural Society of Toronto.
- Stamatović, Aleksandar (2014). Istorija Mitropolije Crnogorsko−primorske 1918-2009 (PDF) (in Serbian). Podgorica: ITP "Unireks". Archived from the original (PDF) on 2019-06-29.

Preceded by Position established	Head of the Montenegrin Orthodox Church; 31 October 1993 – 18 November 1996	Succeeded by Mihailo Dedeić
