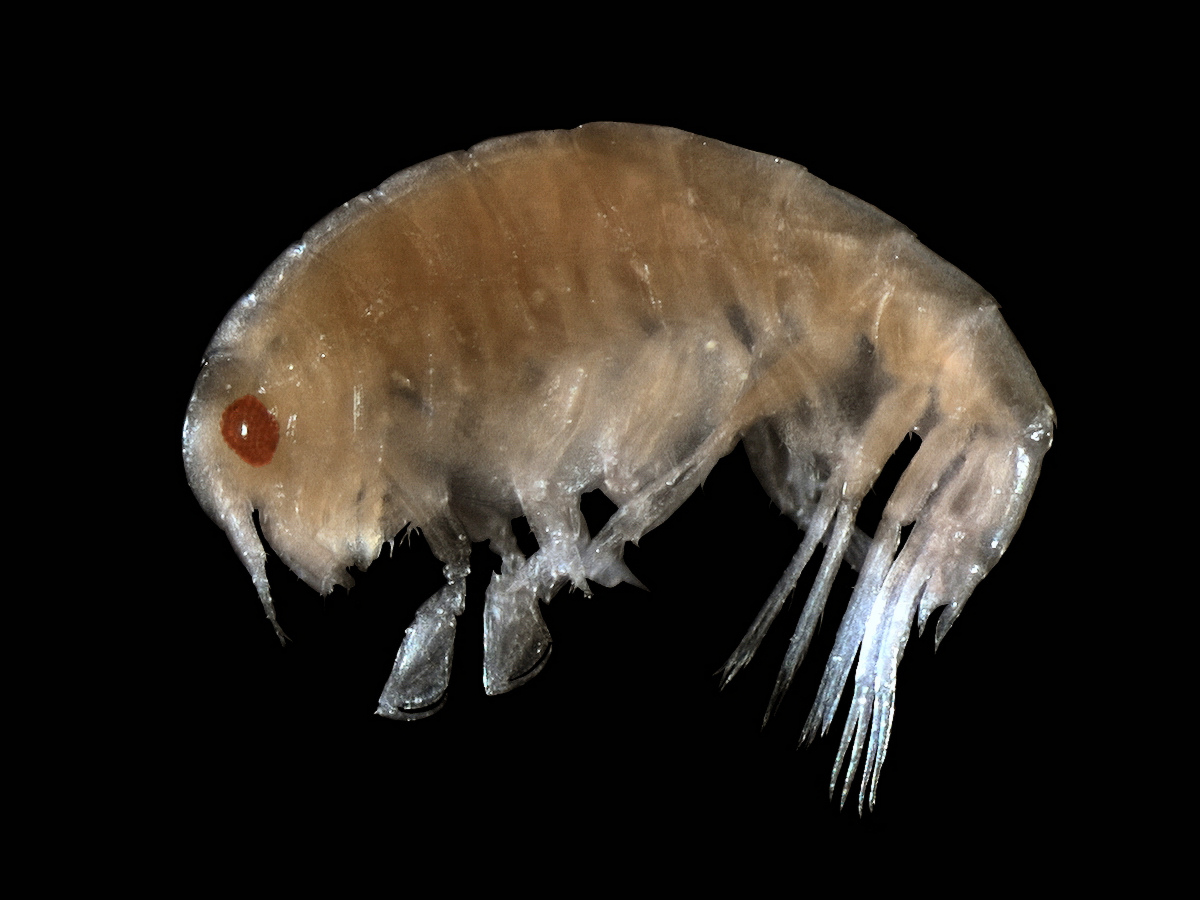
- Amphilochus neapolitanus

Scientific classification
- Domain: Eukaryota
- Kingdom: Animalia
- Phylum: Arthropoda
- Class: Malacostraca
- Order: Amphipoda
- Family: Amphilochidae
- Genus: Amphilochus; Bate, 1862

Type species
- Amphilochus manudens Bate, 1862

Synonyms
- Callimerus Stebbing, 1876; Amphilocus (misspelling)

= Amphilochus (crustacean) =

Genus of crustaceans

Amphilochus is a genus of crustaceans in the order Amphipoda, containing the following species:

- Amphilochus ascidicola Martin, Ortiz & Atienza, 2001
- Amphilochus borealis Enequist, 1949
- Amphilochus brunneus Della Valle, 1893
- Amphilochus casahoya McKinney, 1978
- Amphilochus castroviejoi Ortiz & Lalana, 2002
- Amphilochus delacaya McKinney, 1978
- Amphilochus filidactylus hurley, 1955
- Amphilochus justi Azman, 2009
- Amphilochus kailua J. L. Barnard, 1970
- Amphilochus lacertus Azman, 2009
- Amphilochus likelike J. L. Barnard, 1970
- Amphilochus litoralis Stout, 1912
- Amphilochus manudens Bate, 1862
- Amphilochus marionis Stebbing, 1888
- Amphilochus menehune J. L. Barnard, 1970
- Amphilochus neapolitanus Della Valle, 1893
- Amphilochus opunake J. L. Barnard, 1972
- Amphilochus picadurus J. L. Barnard, 1962
- Amphilochus pillaii Barnard & Thomas, 1983
- Amphilochus planierensis Ledoyer, 1977
- Amphilochus ruperti Moore, 1988
- Amphilochus schubarti Schellenberg, 1938
- Amphilochus spencebatei (Stebbing, 1876)
- Amphilochus tenuimanus Boeck, 1871
- Amphilochus tropicus (Rabindranath, 1972)
