= IN4S =

IN4S / ИН4С
- Type: Online newspaper
- Editor: Gojko Rajčević
- Founded: 6 May 2008
- Political alignment: Right-wing politics Serbian-Montenegrin unionism Serbian nationalism Euroscepticism; Russophilia
- Language: Serbian (Cyrillic script)
- Headquarters: Podgorica, Montenegro
- Website: www.in4s.net

IN4S (Serbian Cyrillic: ИН4С) is a Serb online newspaper that was launched on 6 May 2008 in Montenegro. Within 4 years since the establishment of the site, it has grown into a very influential media that is primarily focused on the politics and the history of Montenegro. The editor-in-chief is Gojko Raičević.

== History ==
IN4S was founded in 2008 by Gojko Rajčević and during 2011, IN4S joined the Montenegro census campaign, highlighting the most important personalities from the history of the Serbs and culture through numerous billboards, brochures, the Internet and newspaper publications. The portal is currently active in the 2021 census campaign. The portal launched an action against Montenegro's accession to NATO in 2016, coordinating the network of non-governmental organizations "No to war - not to NATO".

In August 2020, IN4S published a video in which the activist of the then ruling DPS, Dušica Vulić, talks to a woman about the advancement in the Armed Forces, stating that she needs a positive opinion of the local board of the ruling party.
