= Miraš Dedeić =

21st-century Montenegrin Orthodox bishop

His Beatitude Mihailo
- Archbishop of Cetinje and Metropolitan of Montenegro
- Native name: Михаило
- Church: Montenegrin Orthodox Church
- Installed: 6 January 1997
- Term ended: 3 September 2023
- Predecessor: Antonije Abramović
- Successor: Boris Bojović

Personal details
- Born: Miraš Dedeić; 8 November 1938 (age 87) Ramovo Ždrijelo, Kingdom of Yugoslavia
- Denomination: Non-canonical Eastern Orthodoxy
- Residence: Cetinje
- Education: University of Belgrade Faculty of Theology; Pontifical Oriental Institute

Mihailo Dedeić (Montenegrin Cyrillic: Михаило Дедеић; born 8 November 1938) commonly referred to by his birth name Miraš Dedeić (Montenegrin Cyrillic: Мираш Дедеић), was the second head of the independent Montenegrin Orthodox Church.

== Biography ==
He was born in 1938 in the village of Ramovo Ždrijelo on Durmitor. He graduated from the Faculty of Theology in Belgrade in 1969. He completed his postgraduate studies at the Pontifical Oriental Institute in Rome in 1973 and later attended postgraduate studies at the Russian Theological Academy of St. Sergius in Zagorsk.

After finishing his studies he worked in the state archives of SFR Yugoslavia, Soviet Union and Italy in the Roman representation of the Ecumenical Patriarchate of Constantinople and later served as a priest of the Patriarchate of Constantinople. His service with the Patriarchate of Constantinople ended in 1997, when Patriarch Bartholomew gave a statement saying that Dedeić had been dismissed for canonical offenses including adultery and embezzlement, that his priestly rank had been revoked, and that he had been reinstated as a layman.

On 6 January 1997 in Cetinje, he was proposed and elected head of the Montenegrin Orthodox Church. On 31 October 1998 in Cetinje, he was enthroned as Metropolitan of the Montenegrin Orthodox Church.

On September 3, 2023, Bishop Boris Bojović was proclaimed the new Metropolitan of the church in an assembly held in Cetinje. The decision was supported by a group of younger priests, as well as the hundreds of citizens gathered at the assembly. The assembly also declared the official retirement of former Metropolitan Dedeić. Dedeić rejected the declaration of the assembly, calling it "a failed political rally," and stating that "street rallies cannot change the metropolitan and elect a new one next to a living and healthy leader." Dedeić attempted to nullify the results of the assembly through legal means, but in October 2023, and later in June 2024, his cases were rejected by Montenegrin courts, leaving Bojović as Metropolitan.

== Political views ==
At the beginning of Croatian War of Independence Dedeić gave a statement to the Italian media saying that the war started because of the "desire of the Croatian leadership to take over Serbian territories". He called Dubrovnik a "Serbian city", while comparing Croatian President Franjo Tuđman to Adolf Hitler.

During the 1992-1995 Bosnian War, Dedeić had been fundraising to support the Army of Republika Srpska under Ratko Mladić's command during his plight to support the Serbs fighting the Bosnian Muslims and Croats.

In a Croatian TV show "Bujica", Dedeić stated that Serbia "committed genocide" in Montenegro in 1918 and 1920 and that Serbs are a "disruptive factor in the Balkans and that they should land a little, because there is no longer Greater Serbia". He also added that Croatia has the right to form the Croatian Orthodox Church.

Preceded by Antonije Abramović	Head of MOC; 6 January 1997–3 September 2023	Succeeded by Boris Bojović
