= List of members of the 11th assembly of the Parliament of Montenegro, 2020–present =

This is a list of the 81 members of the current convocation of the Parliament of Montenegro. The current convocation of the Parliament was elected in the 2020 parliamentary election, and is set to meet for the first time on 23 September 2020.

Electoral list	Main ideology	Leader	MPs	Gov't
Democratic Party of Socialists: •Democratic Party of Socialists (29); •Liberal Party of Montenegro (1)	Catch-all party Montenegrin nationalism Pro-Europeanism	Milo Đukanović	30 / 81	No
For the Future of Montenegro: •Democratic Front (19); •Socialist People's Party (5); •Popular Movement (3)	Cultural conservatism Anti-corruption; Serb minority interests	Zdravko Krivokapić	27 / 81	Yes
Peace is Our Nation: •Democratic Montenegro (9); •DEMOS (1)	Moderate politics Anti-corruption; Pro-Europeanism	Aleksa Bečić	10 / 81	Yes
United Reform Action	Social liberalism Green politics Pro-Europeanism	Dritan Abazović	4 / 81	Yes
Social Democrats	Social democracy Populism; Pro-Europeanism	Ivan Brajović	3 / 81	No
Bosniak Party	Bosniak minority interests Social conservatism Pro-Europeanism	Rafet Husović	3 / 81	No
Social Democratic Party	Social democracy Pro-Europeanism; Civic nationalism	Draginja Vuksanović	2 / 81	No
Albanian List: •Albanian Alternative/FORCA (1)	Albanian minority interests Conservatism; Pro-Europeanism	Nik Gjeloshaj	1 / 81	No
Albanian Coalition: •Democratic Party (1)	Albanian minority interests Conservatism; Pro-Europeanism	Fatmir Gjeka	1 / 81	No

== List of elected Members of the Parliament ==
=== Democratic Party of Socialists ===
1. Duško Marković (DPS)
2. Branimir Gvozdenović (DPS)
3. Milutin Simović (DPS)
4. Aleksandra Vuković (DPS)
5. Mevludin Nuhodžić (DPS)
6. Predrag Bošković (DPS)
7. Ivan Vuković (DPS)
8. Gordana Đurović (DPS)
9. Jevto Eraković (DPS)
10. Nikola Rakočević (DPS)
11. Andrija Popović (LPCG)
12. Dragica Sekulić (DPS)
13. Petar Ivanović (DPS)
14. Halil Duković (DPS)
15. Dragutin Papović (DPS)
16. Marta Šćepanović (DPS)
17. Vlastimir Golubović (DPS)
18. Zoran Pažin (Ind.)
19. Časlav Vešović (DPS)
20. Vesna Pavićević (DPS)
21. Miloš Nikolić (DPS)
22. Miodrag Vuković (DPS)
23. Nikola Janović (DPS)
24. Daliborka Pejović (DPS)
25. Branko Čavor (DPS)
26. Bogdan Fatić (DPS)
27. Danijel Živković (DPS)
28. Suzana Pribilović (DPS)
29. Ivan Mitrović (DPS)
30. Abaz Dizdarević (DPS)

=== For the Future of Montenegro ===
1. Zdravko Krivokapić (Ind.)
2. Nebojša Medojević (PzP)
3. Marko Milačić (PCG)
4. Simonida Kordić (NSD)
5. Vladimir Joković (SNP)
6. Maja Vukićević (DNP)
7. Vladimir Dobričanin (UCG)
8. Branko Radulović (PzP)
9. Milun Zogović (DNP)
10. Dragoslav Šćekić (SNP)
11. Branka Bošnjak (PzP)
12. Slaven Radunović (NSD)
13. Strahinja Bulajić (NSD)
14. Predrag Bulatović (DNP)
15. Danijela Đurović (SNP)
16. Milan Knežević (DNP)
17. Vladan Raičević (PzP)
18. Jovan Vučurović (NSD)
19. Jelena Božović (NSD)
20. Dragan Ivanović (SNP)
21. Radoš Zečević (NSD)
22. Marko Kovačević (NSD)
23. Jovanka Bogavac (PzP)
24. Dragan Bojović (DNP)
25. Dragan Vukić (SNP)
26. Milo Božović (NSD)
27. Maksim Vučinić (RP)

=== Peace is Our Nation ===
1. Aleksa Bečić (DCG)
2. Miodrag Lekić (Demos)
3. Zdenka Popović (DCG)
4. Dragan Krapović (DCG)
5. Boris Bogdanović (DCG)
6. Momo Koprivica (DCG)
7. Stevan Katić (DCG)
8. Tamara Vujovič (DCG)
9. Albin Ćeman (DCG)
10. Vladimir Martinović (DCG)

=== United Reform Action ===
1. Dritan Abazović (URA)
2. Miloš Konatar (URA)
3. Božena Jelušić (URA)
4. Srđan Pavićević (CIVIS)

=== Social Democrats of Montenegro ===
1. Ivan Brajović (SD)
2. Damir Šehović (SD)
3. Boris Mugoša (SD)

=== Bosniak Party ===
1. Ervin Ibrahimović (BS)
2. Amer Smailović (BS)
3. Kenana Strujić Harbić (BS)

=== Social Democratic Party ===
1. Draginja Vuksanović (SDP)
2. Raško Konjević (SDP)

=== Albanian List ===
1. Nik Gjeloshaj (AA)

=== Albanian Coalition – Unanimously ===
1. Fatmir Gjeka (DP)
