= Politics of Montenegro =

The Politics of Montenegro (Montenegrin: Politika Crne Gore / Политика Црне Горе) takes place in a framework of a parliamentary representative democratic republic, whereby the Prime Minister of Montenegro is the head of government, and of a multi-party system. Executive power is exercised by the government. Legislative power is vested in both the government and the Parliament of Montenegro. The Judiciary is independent of the executive and the legislature. The Economist Intelligence Unit rated Montenegro a "flawed democracy" in 2022. Montenegro is a candidate to join the European Union since 2010.

== Constitution ==
The current Constitution of Montenegro was ratified and adopted by the Constitutional Parliament of Montenegro on 19 October 2007. The Constitution was officially proclaimed as the Constitution of Montenegro on 22 October 2007. This Constitution replaced the Constitution of 1992.

The new Constitution defines Montenegro as a civic, democratic and environmentally friendly country with social justice, established by the sovereign rights of its government.

Main office-holders
Office	Name	Party	Since
President of Montenegro	Jakov Milatović	Europe Now!	20 May 2023
Prime Minister of Montenegro	Milojko Spajić	Europe Now!	31 October 2023
President of the Parliament	Andrija Mandić	New Serb Democracy	30 October 2023

== Executive branch ==
The Government of Montenegro (Влада Републике Црне Горе, Vlada Republike Crne Gore) comprises the prime minister, the deputy prime ministers as well as ministers. Milojko Spajić is the Prime Minister of Montenegro and head of the Government, since 31 October 2023. The 44nd composition of the Government of Montenegro.

=== President ===
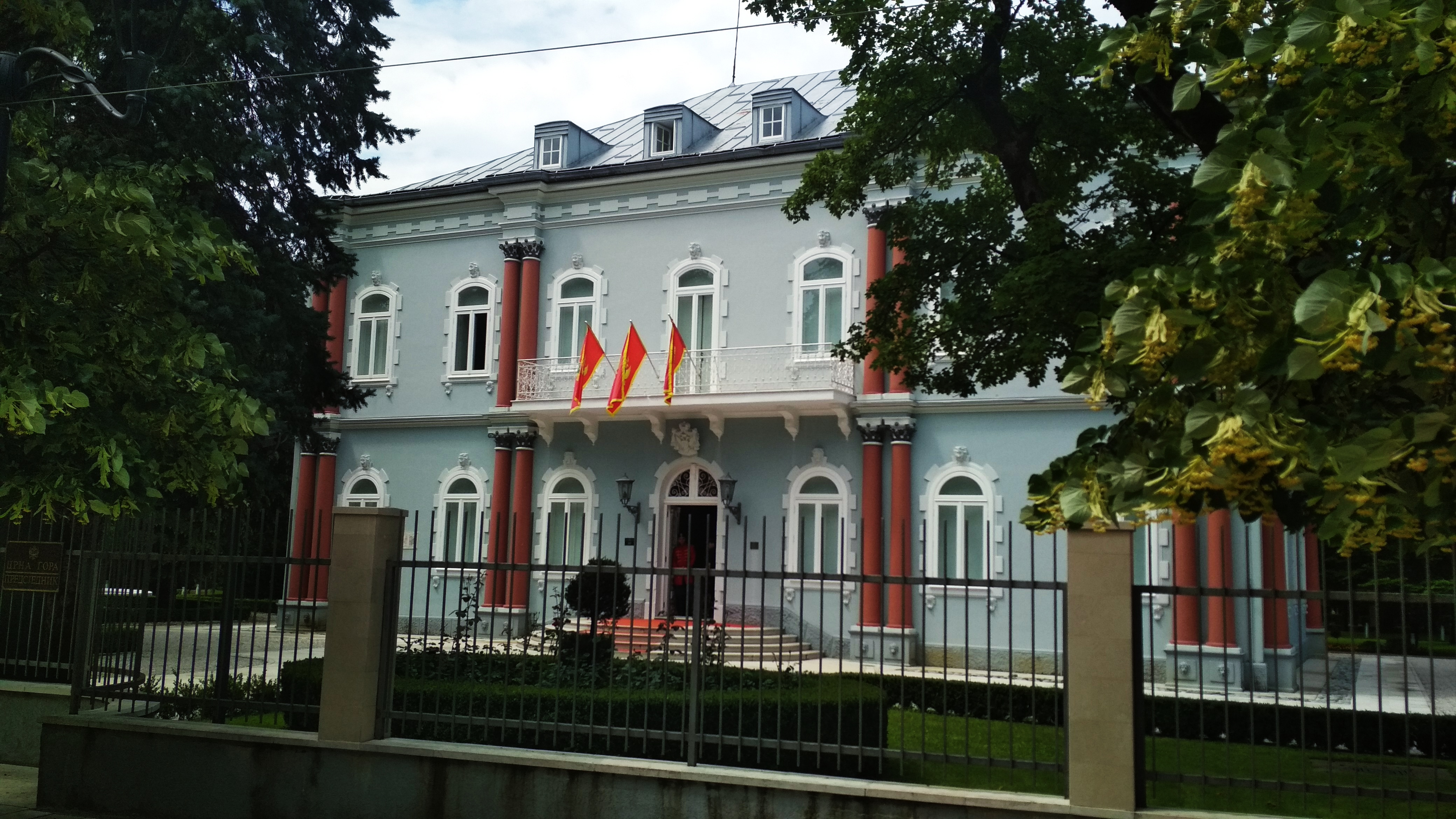
The Blue Palace in Cetinje, the seat of the President of Montenegro

The President of Montenegro is elected for a period of five years through direct and secret ballots. The President:

- Represents Montenegro in the country and abroad
- Promulgates laws
- Calls for Parliamentary elections
- Proposes to the Parliament a candidate for Prime Minister, as well as for the president and justices of the Constitutional Court
- Proposes the holding of a referendum
- Grants pardons
- Confers honors and decorations

=== Government ===
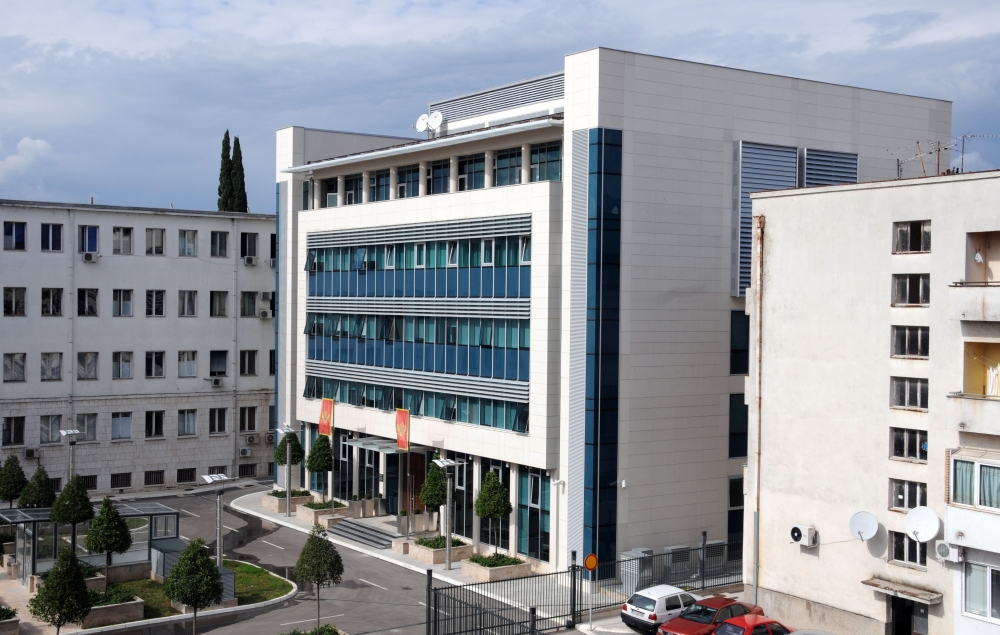
The Government of Montenegro building in Podgorica

The Government of Montenegro is appointed by majority vote of the Parliament. The Government:

- Formulates and conducts foreign policy
- Adopts decrees and other regulations
- Implements laws
- Concludes international treaties
- Establishes the organization and the mode of operation of the government administration
- Performs other duties as laid down in the Constitution

=== Prime minister ===
The Prime Minister of Montenegro directs the work of the Government, and submits to the Parliament the Government's Program including a list of proposed ministers. The resignation of the Prime Minister will cause the fall of the Government.

== Legislative branch ==
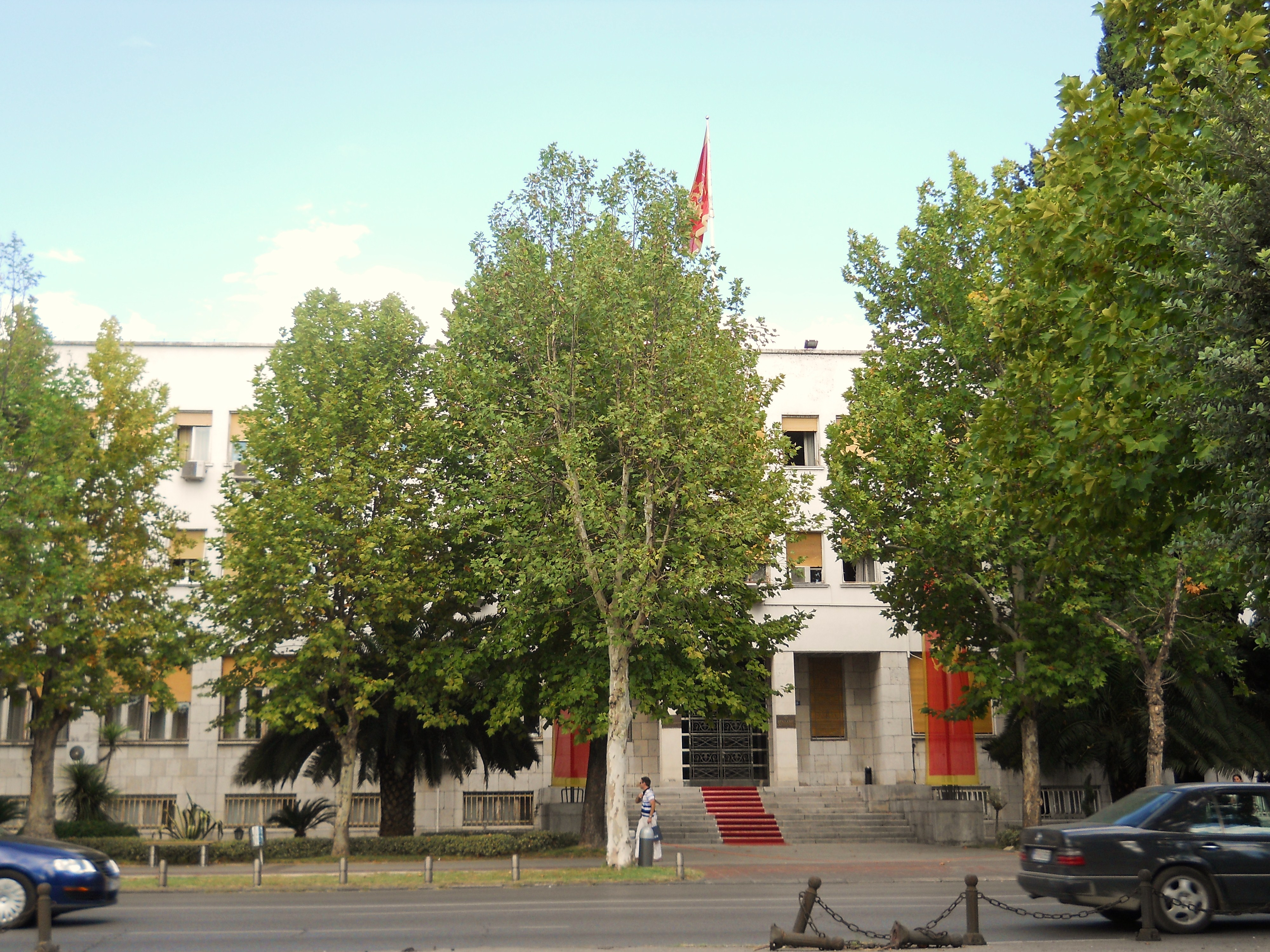
The House of the Assembly in Podgorica, seat of the Parliament

The Parliament of Montenegro (Montenegrin: Скупштина Црне Горе, Skupština Crne Gore) is the legislature of Montenegro. The Parliament currently has 81 members, each elected for a four-year term. Montenegro has a multi-party system, with numerous parties in which no one party often has a chance of gaining power alone, and parties must work with each other to form coalition governments.

The Assembly passes all laws in Montenegro, ratifies international treaties, appoints the prime minister, ministers, and justices of all courts, adopts the budget and performs other duties as established by the Constitution. The Parliament can pass a vote of no-confidence on the Government by a majority of the members. One deputy is elected per 6,000 voters, which in turn results in a reduction of total number of deputies in the Assembly of Montenegro.

== Political parties and elections ==
=== 2023 Parliamentary election ===
Party	Votes	%	Seats	+/–
Europe Now!	77,203	25.53	24	+22
Together! (DPS–SD–LP–UDSh)	70,228	23.22	21	−12
For the Future of Montenegro (NSD–DNP–RP)	44,565	14.74	13	−2
Aleksa and Dritan – Count Bravely! (Democrats–URA)	37,730	12.48	11	−1
Bosniak Party	21,423	7.08	6	+3
SNP–DEMOS	9,472	3.13	2	−4
Social Democratic Party of Montenegro	9,010	2.98	0	−2
Justice for All	8,380	2.77	0	New
Albanian Forum (ASh–LDSh–UNSh)	5,767	1.91	2	+2
Turnaround for a Safe Montenegro	4,833	1.60	0	New
Albanian Alliance (FORCA–PD–LSMZ)	4,512	1.49	1	–1
People's Coalition (DHP–PCG–SCG–DSS–PZPV)	3,630	1.20	0	−1
Croatian Civic Initiative	2,226	0.74	1	+1
Movement for Changes	1,993	0.66	0	−5
Yes, We Can!	1,444	0.48	0	New
Total	302,416	100.00	81	0
Valid votes	302,416	99.05		
Invalid/blank votes	2,890	0.95		
Total votes	305,306	100.00		
Registered voters/turnout	542,468	56.28		
Source: RTC

=== 2020 Parliamentary election ===
Party	Votes	%	Seats	+/–
Democratic Party of Socialists	143,515	35.06	30	–6
For the Future of Montenegro	133,261	32.55	27	+6
Peace is Our Nation	51,298	12.53	10	–2
In Black and White	22,679	5.54	4	+2
Social Democrats	16,769	4.10	3	+1
Bosniak Party^{M}	16,279	3.98	3	+1
Social Democratic Party	12,835	3.14	2	–2
Albanian List^{M}	6,488	1.58	1	0
Albanian Coalition^{M}	4,675	1.14	1	+1
Croatian Civic Initiative^{M}	1,106	0.27	0	–1
Croatian Reform Party^{M}	496	0.12	0	New
Invalid/blank votes	4,500	2.09	–	–
Total	413,894	100	81	0
Registered voters/turnout	540,026	76.64	–	–
^{M} denotes the national minority lists, for which the 3% threshold does not apply.

== Recent developments ==
In April 2018, Milo Djukanovic, the leader of the ruling Democratic Party of Socialists (DPS), won Montenegro’s presidential election. The veteran politician had served as prime minister six times and as president once before.

In September 2020, President Milo Djukanovic’s Democratic Party of Socialists (DPS) narrowly lost the parliamentary election after having led the country for 30 years. The opposition, “For the Future of Montenegro” (ZBCG) bloc, composed mainly of Serb national parties. The new pro-serbian government was formed by Prime Minister Zdravko Krivokapic. However, Prime Minister Zdravko Krivokapic's government was toppled in no-confidence vote after only 14 months in power. In April 2022, a new minority government, comprising moderate parties that are both pro-European and pro-Serb, was formed. The new government was led by Prime Minister Dritan Abazovic.

In March 2023, Jakov Milatovic, a pro-western candidate of the Europe Now movement, won the presidential election run-off over incumbent Milo Djukanovic to succeed him as the next President of Montenegro.

On 31 October 2023, Milojko Spajic of the Europe Now Movement became Montenegro's new prime minister, leading a coalition of both pro-European and pro-Serb parties.

== Judicial branch ==
Montenegro follows the principle of division of powers. Its judicial, legislative, and executive branches are independent of each other. The judiciary is autonomous and independent. The rulings of the courts must be in accordance with the Constitution and the laws of Montenegro. Appointment to a judiciary position is permanent.

With regard to the legal profession, Montenegro officially became a sovereign state in 2006. According to a 2015 source, the country has approximately 800 registered attorneys and the bar association has existed for over a century. Although the Bar Association of Montenegro [Advokatska Komora Crne Gore] maintains records, there is no indication as to how demographic groups, such as women, have fared in the legal field.

== Subdivisions ==
Montenegro is divided in 25 municipalities.

== Symbols ==
A new official flag of Montenegro was adopted on July 12, 2004, by the Montenegrin legislature. The new flag is based on the personal standard of King Nikola I of Montenegro. This flag was all red with a gold border, a gold coat of arms, and the initials "НI" (Н corresponding to N in Latin script) representing King Nikola I. These initials are omitted from the modern flag. The national day of 13 July marks the date in 1878 when the Congress of Berlin recognised Montenegro as the 27th independent state in the world. It is also the date of the 13 July Uprising in 1941 against Fascist Italian occupiers.

In 2004, the Montenegrin legislature selected a popular Montenegrin folk song, "Oh the Bright Dawn of May", as the national anthem. Montenegro's official anthem during the reign of King Nikola was Ubavoj nam Crnoj Gori (To our beautiful Montenegro).
