= Abazović Cabinet =

Government of Montenegro

- 43rd Cabinet of Montenegro
- 2022–2023
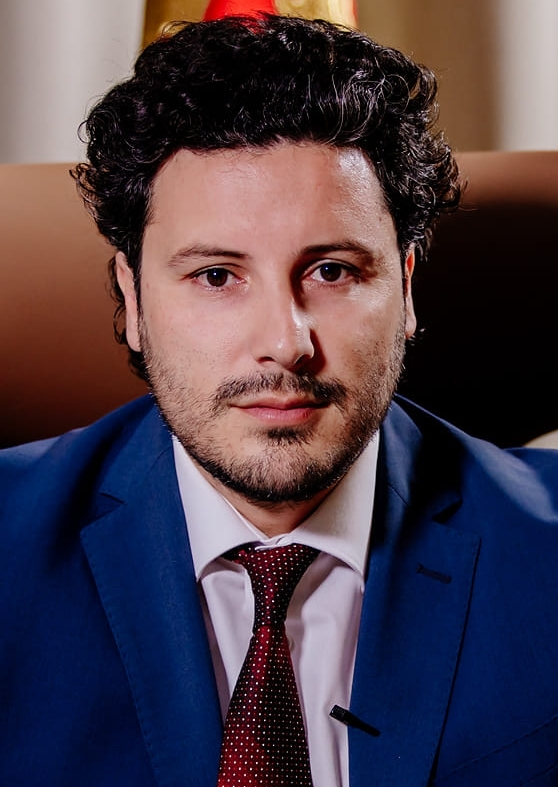
- Date formed: 28 April 2022
- Date dissolved: 31 October 2023

People and organisations
- Head of government: Dritan Abazović
- No. of ministers: 20
- Member parties: SNP, URA, HGI, BS, KSh, LSh
- Status in legislature: Minority government

History
- Election: 30 August 2020
- Predecessor: Krivokapić Cabinet
- Successor: Spajić Cabinet

The Abazović Cabinet was the 43rd cabinet of Montenegro. It was elected on 28 April 2022 by a majority vote in the parliament. The minority government is composed of Civic Movement URA, Socialist People's Party, Bosniak Party, Albanian Coalition and Albanian List, CIVIS, as well as the Croatian Civic Initiative and was supported by the Democratic Party of Socialists and Liberal Party.

On 10 July 2022, DPS and SDP announced a motion of no confidence to the Abazović Cabinet due to the adoption of the draft Fundamental Agreement between Montenegro and the Serbian Orthodox Church. It passed on 20 August 2022.

== Cabinet composition ==
=== Party breakdown ===
- United Reform Action
4
- Socialist People's Party of Montenegro
3
- Bosniak Party
2
- Albanian List
1
- Albanian Coalition
1
- Civis
1

=== Cabinet members ===
Portfolio	Minister	Party	Took office
Prime Minister
General Affairs	Dritan Abazović	URA	28 April 2022
Deputy Prime Ministers
European Integration and Regional Cooperation and Minister of European Affairs	Vacant		
Economic System and Minister of Agriculture, Forestry and Water Management	Vladimir Joković	SNP	28 April 2022
Political System and Internal Policy and Minister of Defense	Vacant		
Regional Development and Minister of Capital Investments	Ervin Ibrahimović	BS	28 April 2022
Ministers
Justice	Marko Kovač	none	28 April 2022
Internal Affairs	Filip Adžić	URA	28 April 2022
Finance	Aleksandar Damjanović	none	28 April 2022
Foreign Affairs	Dritan Abazović (acting)	URA	21 October 2022
Economic Development and Tourism	Goran Đurović	URA	28 April 2022
Sports and Youth	Vasilije Lalošević	SNP	28 April 2022
Public Administration	Marash Dukaj	LSH	28 April 2022
Labor and Social Welfare	Admir Adrović	BS	28 April 2022
Education	Miomir Vojinović	none	28 April 2022
Health	Dragoslav Šćekić	SNP	28 April 2022
Culture and Media	Maša Vlaović	none	28 April 2022
Ecology, Spatial Planning and Urbanism	Ana Novaković Đurović	URA	28 April 2022
Human and Minority Rights	Fatmir Gjeka	KSH	28 April 2022
Science and Technological Development	Biljana Šćepanović	none	28 April 2022
Without Portfolio	Zoran Miljanić	CIVIS	28 April 2022

=== Former members ===
Minister	Party	Portfolio	Period	Days in office
Raško Konjević	SDP	Political System and Internal Policy and Minister of Defense	28 April 2022 – 21 October 2022	176
Ranko Krivokapić	SDP	Foreign Affairs	28 April 2022 – 21 October 2022	176
Adrijan Vuksanović	HGI	Without Portfolio	28 April 2022 – 22 October 2022	177
Jovana Marović	URA	Foreign Affairs, European Integration and Regional Cooperation and Minister of European Affairs	28 April 2022 – 25 November 2022	211
