= 2027 Montenegrin parliamentary election =

- Before 30 June 2027
- All 81 seats in Parliament; 41 seats needed for a majority
Party	Leader	Current seats
PES–DCG–UDSH	Milojko Spajić	27
DPS	Danijel Živković	16
NSD	Andrija Mandić	9
BS	Ervin Ibrahimović	6
URA	Dritan Abazović	4
DNP	Milan Knežević	3
SD	Damir Šehović	3
SNP	Vladimir Joković	2
FSH	Nik Gjeloshaj	2
UCG	Goran Danilović	1
ASH	Genci Nimanbegu	1
HGI	Adrian Vuksanović	1
Independents	–	5
Incumbent Prime Minister
Milojko Spajić; PES

Parliamentary elections are scheduled to be held in Montenegro by 30 June 2027.

== Background ==
The previous parliamentary election in Montenegro was held on 11 June 2023, following a period of political instability and institutional deadlock. The election was called after the dissolution of Parliament in March 2023, amid the collapse of successive governments and difficulties in forming a stable parliamentary majority.

The 2023 election resulted in the Europe Now Movement (PES), led by Milojko Spajić, emerging as the largest political force with 24 seats in the 81-member Parliament. Democratic Party of Socialists (DPS)-led coalition came second with 21 seats, while the For the Future of Montenegro coalition won 13 seats. Following negotiations, Spajić formed coalition government on 31 October 2023.

Under Montenegro's constitutional framework, parliamentary elections are held every four years unless Parliament is dissolved earlier.

== Electoral system ==
The Parliament of Montenegro consists of 81 members elected under a system of proportional representation in a single electoral constituency encompassing the entire country. The general electoral threshold is 3%. Special provisions apply to minority communities that make up no more than 15% of the population; electoral lists representing these communities are entitled to a lower threshold of 0.7%.

== Opinion polls ==

Date	Polling firm/source	PES	DPS	ES			ZBCG		DCG	URA	BS	SNP	ASh	Others/ don't know	Lead
Date	Polling firm/source	PES	DPS	SD	SDP	LP	NSD	DNP	DCG	URA	BS	SNP	ASh	Others/ don't know	Lead
10–19 Oct 2026	Spektrum	24.6	19	7.1			19.1		5.3	7.9	6.6	–	–	–	5.7
10–19 Oct 2026	Spektrum	24.6	19	7.1			10.1	9	5.3	7.9	6.6	–	–	–	5.7
11–23 Apr 2026	Spektrum	20.2	26.3	4.6			22.6		6.4	5.4	6.7	1.9	1.2	6.6	3.7
11–23 Apr 2026	Spektrum	20.2	26.3	4.6			15.1	7.5	6.4	5.4	6.7	1.9	1.2	6.6	3.7
15 Jan 2026	Spektrum	19.1	25.2	5.7			20.1		9.2	3.4	5.6	2.6	1.9	7.2	5.1
25 Sep–6 Oct 2025	CEDEM	20.3	25.8	5.0			23.5		8.2	3.6	5.0	1.4	1.8	5.4	2.3
29 Jul–12 Aug 2025	Ipsos	20.0	24.0	7.0			18.0		8.0	7.0	4.0	–	–	12.0	4.0
30 Jun 2025	Ipsos	25.0	23.0	7.0			20.0		6.0	5.0	3.0	–	–	10.0	2.0
8 Jun 2025	Stars up	24.1	25.8	1.3			18.9		5.9	3.3	7.2	0.4	~5.3	9.1	1.7
15 May 2025	Borba	20.9	25.7	2.9			21.8		5.9	2.3	6.8	2.5	1.9	9.3	3.9
5–14 May 2025	Ipsos	22.0	23.0	9.0			16.0		8.0	7.0	4.0	–	–	11.0	1.0
14 May 2025	Borba	22.5	28.5	3.1			21.9		5.9	2.3	7.2	1.9	1.5	5.2	6.0
1–11 Feb 2025	Ipsos	20.0	21.0	7.0			20.0		7.0	7.0	3.0	–	–	15.0	1.0
10 Mar 2025	Borba	21.9	25.9	3.5			18.9		6.5	2.6	7.3	2.8	1.9	8.7	4.0
14–21 Feb 2025	Borba	23.2	25.5	3.2			17.7		6.8	2.8	7.2	2.7	1.9	9.0	2.3
9–19 Jan 2025	Ipsos	25.0	23.0	7.0			20.0		with PES	8.0	4.0	–	–	13.0	2.0
20–22 Jan 2025	Borba	25.3	19.9	5.1			19.2		5.9	2.8	6.8	1.5	1.5	12.0	5.4
9–11 Jan 2025	Borba	22.5	21.9	4.5			21.7		5.9	2.3	7.1	1.9	1.9	10.3	0.6
23–24 Dec 2024	Borba	21.3	24.3	3.3			20.9		8.1	3.2	6.3	2.1	1.7	8.8	3.0
15 Nov 2024	Borba	19.7	25.4	2.8			19.3		8.9	2.7	6.5	1.7	1.9	11.1	5.7
14–15 Oct 2024	Borba	17.2	26.1	2.8			20.1		9.8	2.0	6.1	1.9	2.0	12.0	6.0
30 Sep – 1 Oct 2024	Borba	14.2	26.8	3.4			20.4		9.7	2.5	5.5	2.3	2.1	13.1	6.4
1–7 Aug 2024	Borba	19.3	23.6	3.7			15.8		8.8	2.9	5.7	2.7	2.1	15.4	4.3
22–26 May 2024	Borba	17.7	19.8	5.1			17.3		10.5	4.3	4.9	2.3	2.8	15.3	2.1
24 Apr 2024	Borba	19.7	26.8	3.2			17.4		6.8	3.2	4.8	2.45	2.4	13.25	7.1
24 Apr 2024	Borba	19.7	26.8	-	-	-	11.6	5.8	6.8	3.2	4.8	2.45	2.4	13.25	7.1
16–23 May 2024	Damar	22.8	21.1	2.6	3.2	-	13.7		7.0	3.9	6.7	3.7	2.3	13.0	1.7
11–15 Mar 2024	Borba	19.2	24.3	1.9	2.4	-	15.9		7.6	3.5	5.0	2.6	2.5	15.1	5.1
5–19 Mar 2024	CEDEM	26.3	26.0	2.2	2.3	-	15.5		10.0	3.4	5.3	2.2	1.9	4.9	0.3
12–27 Dec 2023	CEDEM	24.3	23.9	1.8	2.5	-	16.6		10.0	3.9	7.0	3.0	2.8	4.2	0.4
11 Jun 2023	Election results	25.5	23.2		2.98	-	14.7		12.5		7.1	3.1	1.9	12.1	2.3
