= Government of Montenegro =

- Vlada Crne Gore; Влада Црне Горе
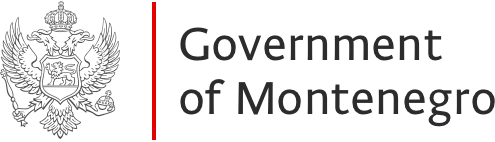
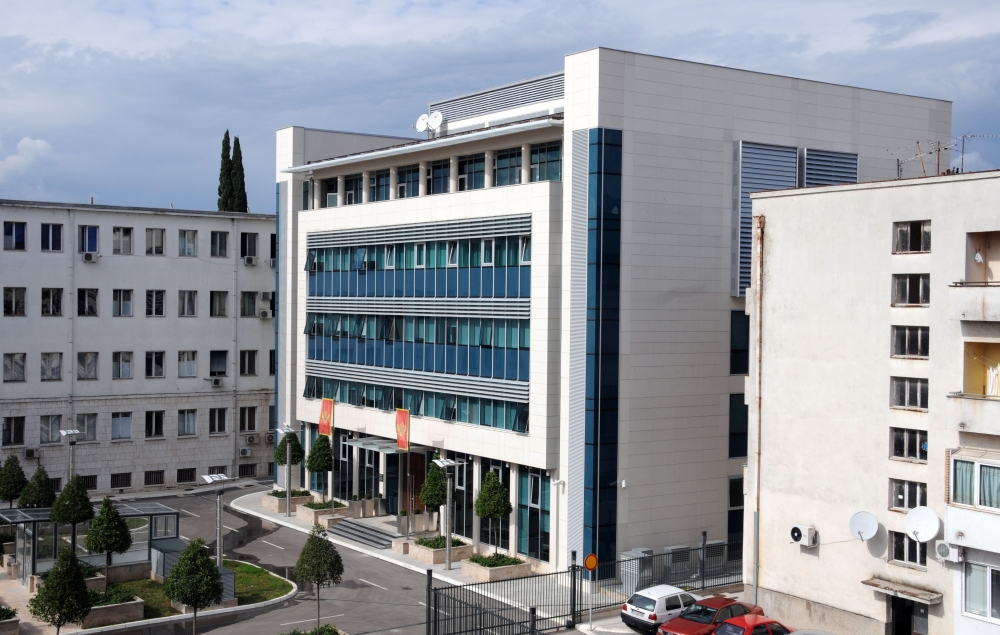
- Logo of Government of Montenegro The Government building in Podgorica

Overview
- Established: 31 October 2023; 2 years ago, (Current, 44th composition of the Government of Montenegro)
- State: Montenegro
- Leader: Prime Minister (nominated by the President of Montenegro)
- Appointed by: Parliament of Montenegro (Skupština Crne Gore)
- Ministries: 23 (including Deputy PMs)
- Responsible to: Parliament of Montenegro (Skupština Crne Gore)
- Headquarters: Podgorica
- Website: www.gov.me

The government of Montenegro (Montenegrin: Vlada Crne Gore, Влада Црне Горе) is the executive branch of state authority in Montenegro. It is headed by the prime minister. It consists of the prime minister, the deputy prime ministers, and the ministers.

Milojko Spajić has served as Prime Minister of Montenegro since 31 October 2023, with the members of his cabinet being elected by Parliament of Montenegro.

== Current ministries ==
Each minister of each ministry reports to the Prime Minister. Ministries in the current 44th composition of the Government of Montenegro (2023–present):

- Ministry of Justice and Human and Minority Rights
- Ministry of Public Administration, Digital Society and Media
- Ministry of Foreign Affairs
- Ministry of Interior Affairs
- Ministry of Defense
- Ministry of Education, Science, Culture and Sports
- Ministry of Finance and Social Welfare
- Ministry of Economy
- Ministry of Capital Investments
- Ministry of Health
- Ministry of Ecology, Spatial planning and Urbanism
- Ministry of Agriculture and Rural Development

== Current composition ==
| Portfolio | Minister | Party | Took office |
|---|---|---|---|
Prime Minister
| General Affairs | Milojko Spajić | PES! | 31 October 2023 |
Deputy Prime Ministers
| Security, Internal Policy, European and Foreign Affairs | Aleksa Bečić | DCG | 31 October 2023 |
| International Relations; Minister of Foreign Affairs | Ervin Ibrahimović | BS | 23 July 2024 |
| Foreign and European Affairs | Filip Ivanović | PES! | 23 July 2024 |
| Education, Science and Relations with Religious Communities | Budimir Aleksić | NSD | 23 July 2024 |
| Health and Social Welfare | Jelena Borovinić Bojović | Independent | 23 July 2026 |
| Political System, Judiciary and Anti-Corruption | Momo Koprivica | DCG | 31 October 2023 |
| Economic Policy; Minister of Economic Development | Nik Gjeloshaj | AF | 31 October 2023 |
Ministers
| Finance | Novica Vuković | PES! | 31 October 2023 |
| Justice | Bojan Božović | PES! | 23 July 2024 |
| Labour and Social Welfare | Naida Nišić | PES! | 31 October 2023 |
| Health | Vojislav Šimun | PES! | 31 October 2023 |
| Mining | Saša Mujović | PES! | 31 October 2023 |
| Education, Science and Innovation | Anđela Jakšić Stojanović | PES! | 31 October 2023 |
| Maritime Affairs | Filip Radulović | PES! | 31 October 2023 |
| European Affairs | Maida Gorčević | PES! | 31 October 2023 |
| Internal Affairs | Danilo Šaranović | DCG | 31 October 2023 |
| Defense | Dragan Krapović | DCG | 31 October 2023 |
| Ecology, Sustainable Development and Development of the North | Damjan Ćulafić | DCG | 23 July 2024 |
| Culture and Media | Tamara Vujović | DCG | 31 October 2023 |
| Spatial Planning, Urbanism and State Property | Slaven Radunović | NSD | 23 July 2024 |
| Tourism | Simonida Kordić | NSD | 23 July 2024 |
| Transport | Radoš Zečević | NSD | 23 July 2026 |
| Agriculture, Forestry and Water Management | Vladimir Joković | SNP | 31 October 2023 |
| Sports and Youth | Dragoslav Šćekić | SNP | 31 October 2023 |
| Energy, Oil and Gas | Admir Šahmanović | BS | 23 July 2024 |
| Social Welfare, Family Care and Demography | Damir Gutić | BS | 23 July 2024 |
| Diaspora | Mirsad Azemović | BS | 23 July 2024 |
| Regional Investment Development and Cooperation with NGOs | Ernad Suljević | BS | 23 July 2024 |
| Public Administration | Marash Dukaj | AF | 31 October 2023 |
| Human and Minority Rights | Fatmir Gjeka | AA | 31 October 2023 |
| Without Portfolio | Milutin Buturović | PES! | 23 July 2024 |
| Without Portfolio | Jovan Jole Vučurović | NSD | 23 July 2026 |

== Government history ==
List of governments of Montenegro (independent country, 2006–present)

| Assumed office | Prime Minister | Composition | Cabinet | Election |
|---|---|---|---|---|
| 10 November 2006 | Željko Šturanović | DPS, SDP, DUA | Šturanović | 2006 |
| 29 February 2008 | Milo Đukanović | DPS, SDP, DUA | Đukanović (V) | 2006 |
| 29 February 2008 | Milo Đukanović | DPS, SDP, DUA, BS | Đukanović (V) | 2009 |
| 29 December 2010 | Igor Lukšić | DPS, SDP, DUA, BS | Lukšić | 2009 |
| 4 December 2012 | Milo Đukanović | DPS, SDP, BS, HGI | Đukanović (VI) | 2012 |
| 28 November 2016 | Duško Marković | DPS, SD, BS, AO, HGI | Marković | 2016 |
| 4 December 2020 | Zdravko Krivokapić | NDCG, URA with MNN, CIVIS and ZBCG support | Krivokapić | 2020 |
| 28 April 2022 | Dritan Abazović | SNP, URA, BS, CIVIS, KSH, LSH with DPS and LP support | Abazović | 2020 |
| 31 October 2023 | Milojko Spajić | PES!, DCG, SNP, CIVIS, BS, AF, AA, ZBCG and UCG support | Spajić | 2023 |

== See also ==
- Politics of Montenegro
  - Parliament of Montenegro
  - President of Montenegro
