= Spajić Cabinet =

Current and 44th government of Montenegro

- 44th Cabinet of Montenegro
- 2023–present
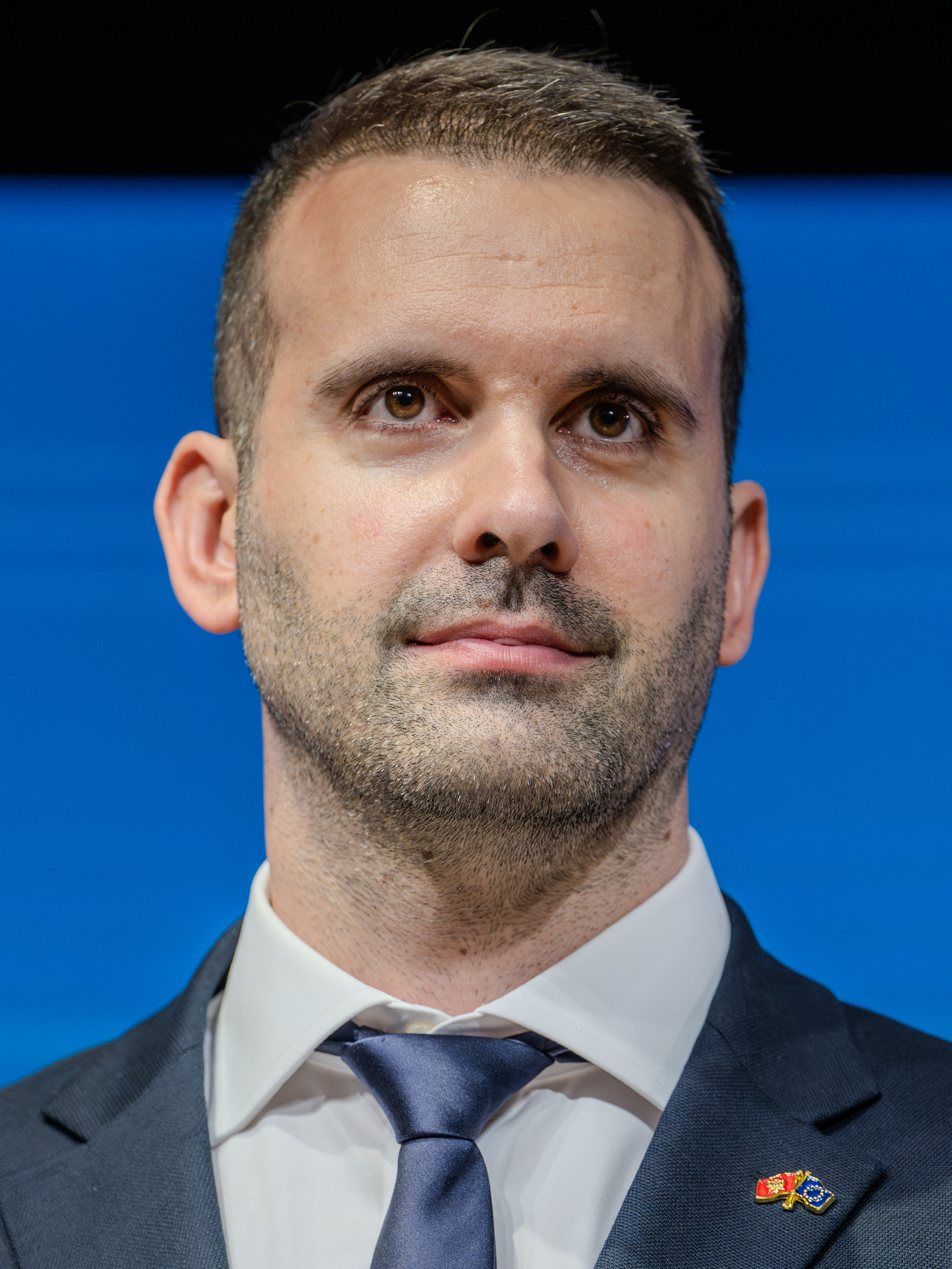
- Date formed: 31 October 2023

People and organisations
- Head of government: Milojko Spajić
- No. of ministers: 28
- Member parties: PES!, NSD, DCG, BS, SNP, UCG, CIVIS, AF, AA, UDSh
- Status in legislature: Majority government

History
- Election: 11 June 2023
- Predecessor: Abazović Cabinet

The Spajić Cabinet is the 44th cabinet of Montenegro. It was elected on 31 October 2023 by a majority vote in the parliament. The government is composed of Europe Now, Democratic Montenegro, For the Future of Montenegro (NSD), Bosniak Party, Socialist People's Party, Albanian Forum, and Albanian Alliance. The Democratic People's Party (DNP) withdrew its support from the cabinet on 31 January 2026 after the party's ministers resigned.

== Cabinet composition ==
=== Party breakdown ===
- Europe Now!
11
- Democratic Montenegro
6
- Bosniak Party
5
- New Serb Democracy
3
- Socialist People's Party of Montenegro
2
- Albanian Forum
2
- Albanian Alliance
1

=== Cabinet members ===
Portfolio	Minister	Party	Took office
Prime Minister
General Affairs	Milojko Spajić	PES!	31 October 2023
Deputy Prime Ministers
Security, Internal Policy, Fight Against Crime	Aleksa Bečić	DCG	31 October 2023
Minister of Foreign Affairs	Ervin Ibrahimović	BS	23 July 2024
European and Foreign Affairs	Filip Ivanović	PES!	23 July 2024
Education, Science and Relations with Religious Communities	Budimir Aleksić	NSD	23 July 2024
Infrastructure and Regional Development	Milun Zogović	DNP	
Political System, Judiciary and Anti-Corruption	Momo Koprivica	DCG	31 October 2023
Economic Policy; Minister of Economic Development	Nik Gjeloshaj	AF	31 October 2023
Ministers
Finance	Novica Vuković	PES!	31 October 2023
Justice	Bojan Božović	PES!	23 July 2024
Labour and Social Welfare	Naida Nišić	PES!	31 October 2023
Health	Vojislav Šimun	PES!	31 October 2023
Mining	Saša Mujović	PES!	31 October 2023
Education, Science and Innovation	Anđela Jakšić Stojanović	PES!	31 October 2023
Maritime Affairs	Filip Radulović	PES!	31 October 2023
European Affairs	Maida Gorčević	PES!	31 October 2023
Internal Affairs	Danilo Šaranović	DCG	31 October 2023
Defense	Dragan Krapović	DCG	31 October 2023
Ecology, Sustainable Development and Development of the North	Damjan Ćulafić	DCG	23 July 2024
Culture and Media	Tamara Vujović	DCG	31 October 2023
Spatial Planning, Urbanism and State Property	Slaven Radunović	NSD	23 July 2024
Tourism	Simonida Kordić	NSD	23 July 2024
Transport	Filip Radulović (acting)	PES!	5 February 2026
Agriculture, Forestry and Water Management	Vladimir Joković	SNP	31 October 2023
Sports and Youth	Dragoslav Šćekić	SNP	31 October 2023
Energy, Oil and Gas	Admir Šahmanović	BS	23 July 2024
Social Welfare, Family Care and Demography	Damir Gutić	BS	23 July 2024
Diaspora	Mirsad Azemović	BS	23 July 2024
Regional Investment Development and Cooperation with NGOs	Ernad Suljević	BS	23 July 2024
Public Administration	Marash Dukaj	AF	31 October 2023
Human and Minority Rights	Fatmir Gjeka	AA	31 October 2023
Without Portfolio	Milutin Buturović	PES!	23 July 2024

=== Former members ===
Minister	Party	Portfolio	Period	Days in office
Milun Zogović	DNP	Infrastructure and Regional Development	23 July 2024 – 31 January 2026	557
Maja Vukićević	DNP	Transport	23 July 2024 – 31 January 2026	557
