= 2027 in Europe =

This is a list of events that will take place in Europe in 2027.

== Incumbents ==
=== European Union ===
- Presidency of the Council of the EU:
  - Lithuania (January–June)
  - Greece (July–December)

== Events ==
=== Scheduled and confirmed events ===
- January 13–31: 2027 World Men's Handball Championship in Germany
- January 30 – 2027 German presidential election will be held.
- March 7 – Next Estonian parliamentary election will be held.
- April 18 – French presidential election will be held.
- April 18 – 2027 Finnish parliamentary election will be held.
- May – The 2027 Eurovision Song Contest is scheduled, which will be hosted in Bulgaria.
- May 14–30 – 2027 IIHF World Championship in Germany
- May 15 – August 15 – Expo 2027 is scheduled to be held in Belgrade, Serbia.
- May 26 – 2027 UEFA Europa League final in Frankfurt am Main, Germany
- June 16 –June 27 Istanbul, Turkey, will host the 2027 European Games.
- June 5 – 2027 UEFA Champions League final in Madrid, Spain.
- July 25 – Next Greek parliamentary election wil be held.
- July 28-August 8 – 2027 Women's EuroHockey Championship and 2027 Men's EuroHockey Championship in England
- September 25 – Next Slovak parliamentary election will be held.
- November 7 – If not triggered earlier, the next Polish parliamentary election will occur no later than this date.
- December 22 – If not triggered earlier, the next Italian general election will occur no later than this date.

=== Date unknown ===
- The 2027 Andorran parliamentary election will be held.
- The 2027 Montenegrin parliamentary election will be held.
- The 2027 Slovenian presidential election will be held.

== See also ==
- 2027 in politics
