= Tamara Srzentić =

Tamara Srzentić Тамара Срзентић
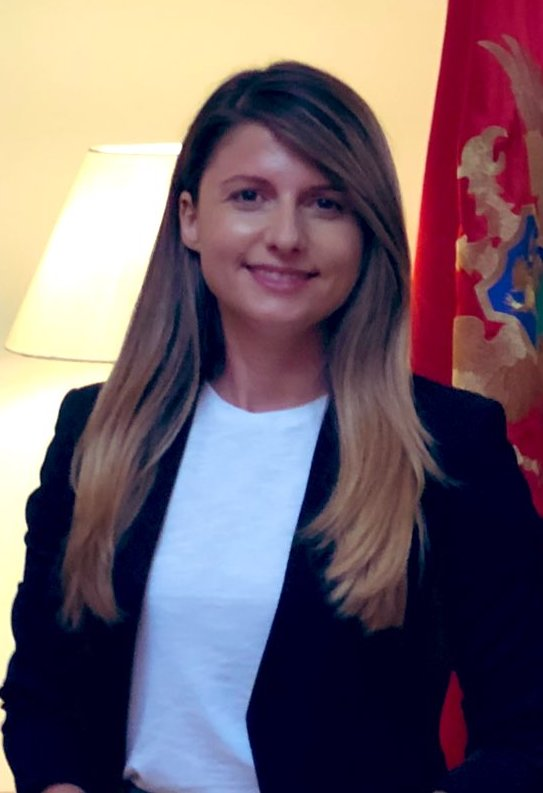
- Tamara Srzentić in July 2021

Minister of Public Administration, Digital Society and Media of Montenegro
- In office 4 December 2020 – 28 April 2022
- Prime Minister: Zdravko Krivokapić
- Preceded by: Suzana Pribilović
- Succeeded by: Marash Dukaj

Personal details
- Born: 1982 (age 43–44) Cetinje, SFR Yugoslavia (now Montenegro)
- Party: Independent
- Education: California State University; Temple University

Tamara Srzentić (Serbian Cyrillic: Тамара Срзентић; born 1982) is a Montenegrin expert on digital transformation and innovation. She served as the Minister of Public Administration, Digital Society and Media in Montenegrin government and the cabinet of Zdravko Krivokapić, from 2020 to 2022, prior to which she was Deputy Director of the California Innovation Office.

== Biography ==
=== Early life and education ===
Srzentić was born in Cetinje, SR Montenegro, SFRY. She graduated from the California State University and defended her master's degree at Temple University in Philadelphia.

She has more than 15 years of experience in government reform, policy management and digital transformation. During the past two administrations of California, Srzentić has advocated a course for priority digital service and public transformation policy initiatives and strategies for the world’s fifth largest economy. During this period, California reshaped policies and standards, launched public-private partnerships, saved money, improved services, and built lasting opportunities for innovation and digital service delivery. She also built two startups for the state of California.

=== Administration career ===
In 2017, she co-founded and became deputy director of the California Innovation Office at the California Health and Humanitarian Service, which was responsible for fostering innovation for 13 state departments of 30,000 employees with an annual budget of about $160 billion, providing critical health and social care. services for nearly one-third of all California residents. She was part of the core team that worked to establish the Digital Innovation Office, which focuses on improving the usability, reliability and user experience of California's most important digital services. Srzentić has consulted with leaders around the world on civic technology, technology policy, public administration reform and digital transformation, and has led digital services, innovation communities in practice, workshops and trainings in California, the Western Balkans and European countries. In 2020, she led the team that created the website for California's response to COVID-19.

On 5 November 2020, the Prime Minister-designate of Montenegro, Zdravko Krivokapić, appointed her a candidate for the Minister of Public Administration, Digital Society and Media in the new Government cabinet of Montenegro.
