= Filip Ivanović (politician) =

Montenegrin academic

Filip Ivanović FRHistS
- Филип Ивановић
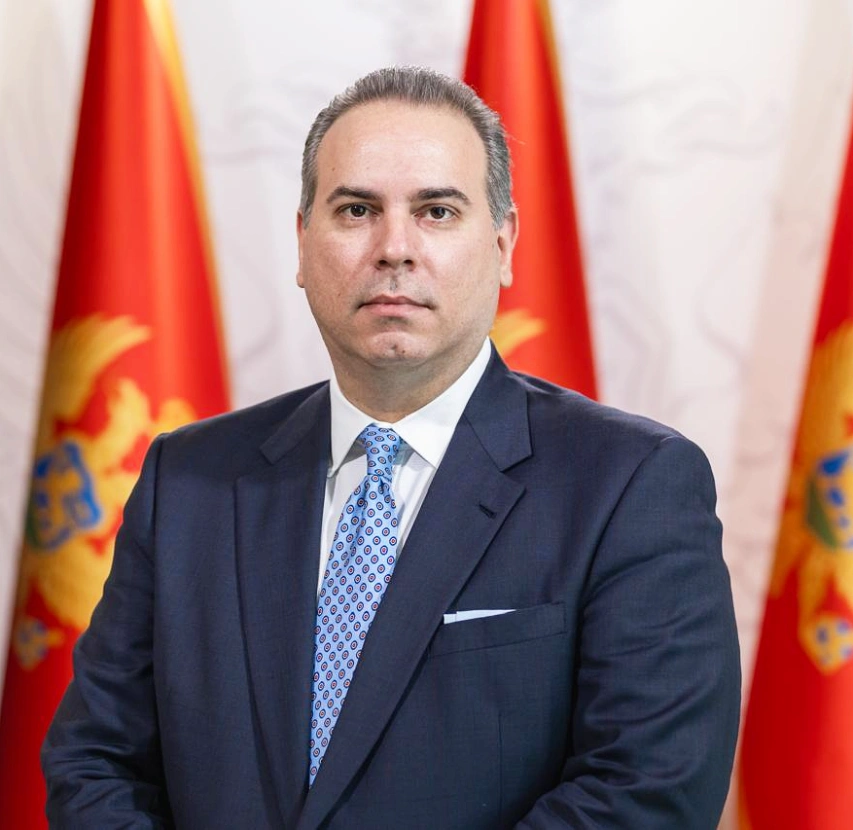
- Official portrait, 2024

Deputy Prime Minister for Foreign and European Affairs
- Incumbent
- Assumed office 23 July 2024
- Prime Minister: Milojko Spajić

Minister of Foreign Affairs
- In office 31 October 2023 – 23 July 2024
- Prime Minister: Milojko Spajić
- Preceded by: Dritan Abazović (acting)
- Succeeded by: Ervin Ibrahimović

Member of the Parliament of Montenegro
- In office 27 July 2023 – 31 October 2023

Acting Foreign Policy Advisor to the President of Montenegro
- In office April 2023 – June 2023
- President: Jakov Milatović

Personal details
- Born: 6 January 1986 (age 40) Titograd, SR Montenegro, SFR Yugoslavia
- Party: Europe Now (2022–present)
- Education: University of Bologna; Norwegian University of Science and Technology
- Occupation: Philosopher, university professor and politician

Filip Ivanović FRHistS (Serbian Cyrillic: Филип Ивановић; born 6 January 1986) is a Montenegrin philosopher, university professor, and politician, who served as minister of foreign affairs of Montenegro from October 2023 to July 2024. Currently he holds the position of Deputy Prime Minister for Foreign and European Affairs in the Government of Montenegro.

He is a research associate at the University of Montenegro and a presidency member of Europe Now Movement (PES).

== Early life and education ==
Ivanović was born on 6 January 1986 in Titograd, SR Montenegro, SFR Yugoslavia, where he completed his elementary education and gymnasium. He graduated from the Department of Philosophy of the University of Bologna, where he also received his master's degree in 2009.

He obtained his PhD in 2014 from the Department of Philosophy and Religious Studies of the Norwegian University of Science and Technology, defending his doctoral thesis on Dionysius the Areopagite and Maximus the Confessor before an international committee.

Ivanović also holds a Postgraduate Diploma in Diplomatic Practice from the United Nations Institute for Training and Research.

== Academic career ==
From 2010 to 2014 Ivanović worked as a research & teaching fellow at the Norwegian University of Science and Technology. From 2015 to 2016 he was a research associate at the Van Leer Jerusalem Institute and a visiting researcher at the Hebrew University of Jerusalem, and from 2016 to 2017 he worked as a researcher at the Department of Greek Studies of the University of Leuven. He specialized at the Aarhus University (2010) and twice (2012/2013 and 2017/2018) at the Norwegian Institute at Athens as an Onassis International Scholar.

In the academic year 2018/2019 he taught aesthetics at the Music Academy of the University of Montenegro, and in 2019 he became assistant professor of philosophy and culture at the University of Donja Gorica in Podgorica. In April 2022, he was appointed assistant research professor at the Institute of Advanced Studies of the University of Montenegro.

He is the founder and director of the Center for Hellenic Studies in Podgorica, one of the founders of the International Conference of Hellenic Studies, and editor-in-chief of the international scholarly journal Akropolis: Journal of Hellenic Studies. He is a member of the Committee for Philosophy and Sociology of the Montenegrin Academy of Sciences and Arts (CANU), the Working Group for negotiations on Montenegro's accession to the European Union for Chapter 25 "Science and Research", and the College of Research Associates of the European Science Foundation. He is an external expert at the Agency for Control and Quality Assurance of Higher Education of Montenegro. From April 2022 to August 2023 Ivanović served as a member of the Governing board of the University of Montenegro. In 2022, he was a member of the jury for the Thirteenth of July Award, the highest state recognition of Montenegro.

Ivanović is a member of numerous academic and professional associations, including the International Society for the Study of Medieval Philosophy, the International Association of Patristic Studies, the International Society for Neoplatonic Studies, the North American Patristic Association, the American Philosophical Association, and others.

Ivanović is also a fellow of the Young Academy of Europe and a fellow of the Royal Historical Society, as well as member of the CANU Center for Young Scientists and Artists.

== Political career ==
The government of Zdravko Krivokapić appointed Ivanović as Ambassador of Montenegro to the Holy See, for which he received the agrément from the Vatican in September 2021. The then President of Montenegro Milo Đukanović refused to sign letters of credence for Ivanović, justifying this position with the opinion that a career diplomat should be sent to the Vatican.

In August 2022, Ivanović joined the newly founded centrist Europe Now (PES), led by former ministers Milojko Spajić and Jakov Milatović and became its presidency member. PES participated at the 2022 local elections and Ivanović was elected to the City Assembly of Podgorica. He was sworn in on 12 April 2023, but resigned from this post in May 2023, citing incompatibility with duties at the Governing board of the University of Montenegro.

Following Milatović's victory in the 2023 presidential election, Ivanović served as acting foreign policy advisor to the President.

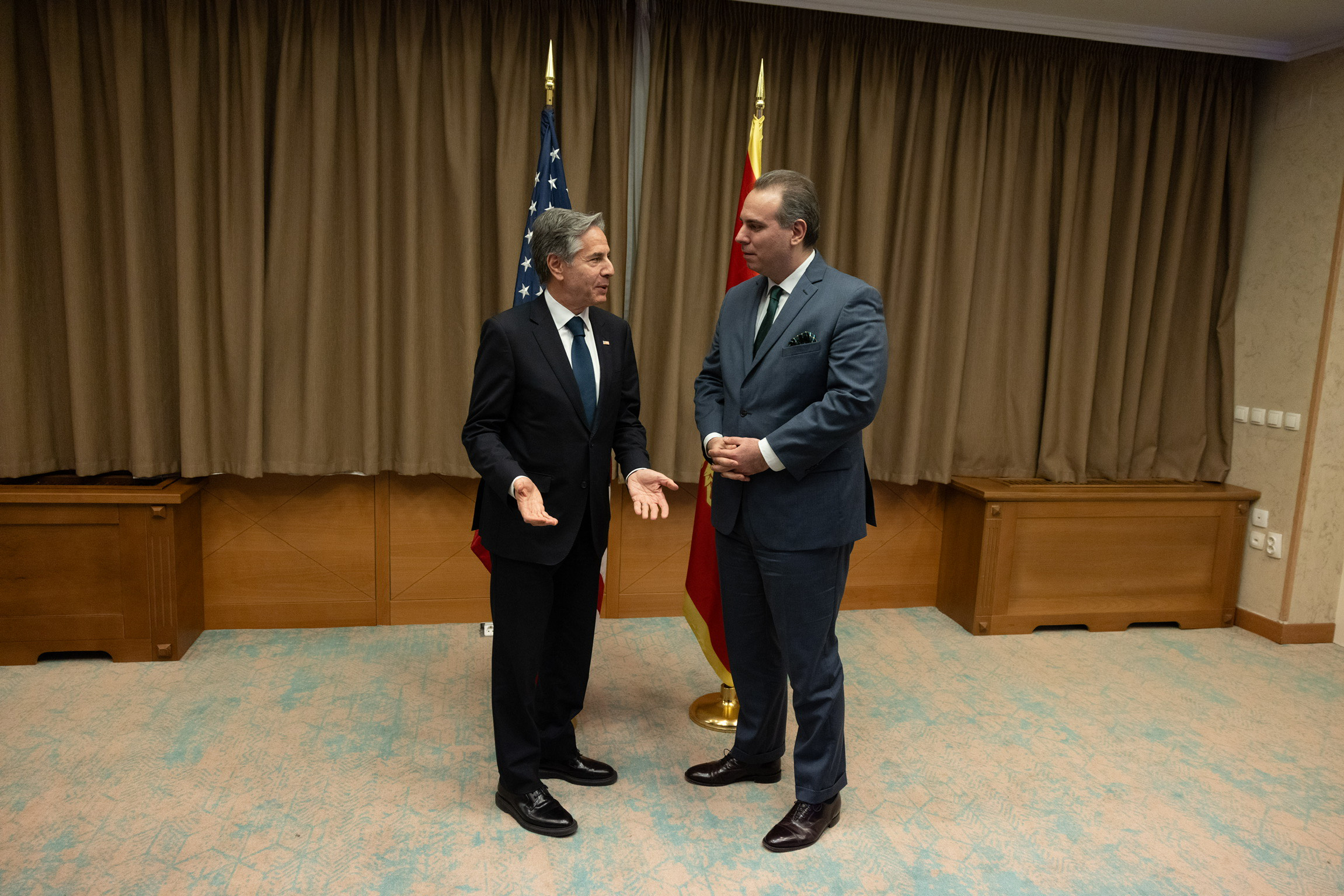
Ivanović with U.S Secretary of State Antony Blinken in November 2023

He received second position on PES's electoral list for the 2023 parliamentary election and was elected to the Parliament of Montenegro following PES's election victory.

=== Minister of Foreign Affairs & Deputy Prime Minister ===
On 31 October 2023 a new government of Montenegro was elected, with Ivanović as minister of foreign affairs. On 23 July 2024 Spajić carried out a reshuffle of the cabinet, with Ervin Ibrahimović as minister of foreign affairs, and Ivanović as deputy prime minister for foreign and European affairs.

== Personal life ==
Ivanović is an adherent of the Serbian Orthodox Church (SPC).

== Selected works ==
=== Books ===
- Desiring the Beautiful: The Erotic-Aesthetic Dimension of Deification in Dionysius the Areopagite and Maximus the Confessor, Washington, DC: The Catholic University of America Press, 2019
- Symbol and Icon: Dionysius the Areopagite and the Iconoclastic Crisis, Eugene, OR: Pickwick, 2010

=== Articles and Papers ===
- “Pseudo-Dionysius and the Importance of Sensible Things”, in: F. Dell’Acqua & E.S. Mainoldi (eds.), Pseudo-Dionysius and Christian Visual Culture c. 500-900, London: Palgrave MacMillan, 2020, 77–87.
- “Philosophy as a Way of Life in Maximus the Confessor”, in: K. Boudouris (ed.), Proceedings of the XXIII World Congress of Philosophy, vol. 6, Charlottesville: Philosophy Documentation Center, 2018, 5–9.
- "Педагошка и терапеутска улога философије код Климента Александријског", Гласник Одјељења хуманистичких наука Црногорске академије наука и умјетност, 4, 2018, 199–217.
- “Union with and Likeness to God: Deification According to Dionysius the Areopagite”, in: M. Edwards & E. Vasilescu (eds.), Visions of God and Ideas on Deification in Patristic Thought, London: Routledge, 2017, 118–157.
- “Maximus the Confessor’s Conception of Beauty”, International Journal of the Classical Tradition, 22:2, 2015, 159–179.
- “The Eternally and Uniquely Beautiful: Dionysius the Areopagite’s Understanding of the Divine Beauty”, International Journal of Philosophy and Theology, 75:3, 2014, 188- 204.
- "Знање и традиција код Климента Александријског", Филозофија и друштво, 24:2, 2013, 264–274.
- “The Ecclesiology of Dionysius the Areopagite”, International Journal for the Study of the Christian Church, 11:1, 2011, 27–44.
- “Byzantine Philosophy and its Historiography”, Byzantinoslavica: Revue internationale des études byzantines, 68, 2010, 369–381.
