= Budimir Šegrt =

Montenegrin doctor and politician

Budimir Šegrt (Cyrillic: Будимир Шегрт; born 19 November 1956 in Trebinje) is a Montenegrin doctor, professor and politician who served as the Minister of Health in the Government of Montenegro from 14 March 2015 to 28 November 2016. He is currently serving as the Ambassador of Montenegro to Poland.

On 29 December 2020, the Deputy Prime Minister of Montenegro Dritan Abazović announced that Šegrt was arrested. On 20 January 2021, at the request of the Special State Prosecutor's Office, Šegrt's sentence was terminated.
