= Filip Ivanović =

Filip Ivanović may refer to:

- Filip Ivanović (footballer)
- Filip Ivanović (politician)
