= Srzentić =

Srzentić (Serbian Cyrillic: Срзентић), sometimes Srezentić (Срезентић), is a surname found in Montenegro, Serbia and Croatia.

There was a Srzentić brotherhood (family) of the historical Paštrovići tribe; seven houses recorded in Brda (1960), and two houses recorded in Sotonići (1941, 1960). The brotherhood has the slava (patron saint veneration) of St. Nicholas (Nikoljdan). It was earlier called Ćuda. The family has been connected to the Zanović family.

In Croatia, the surname is found around Zadar.

Notable people with the surname include:

Srzentić

- Andelo Srzentic (born 1990), Croatian football player
- Milan Srzentić (1893–1914), Montenegrin navy captain.
- Tamara Srzentić (born 1982), Montenegrin government official
- Zoran Srzentić (born 1954), Montenegrin government official

Srezentić

- Vaso Srezentić, Serbian banker during the Kingdom of Yugoslavia.
- Spiro Srezentić, Yugoslav military attache and political instructor to the Albanian army.
- Mirko Srezentić, Serbian student, whose murder sparked the February demonstrations in 1935.
- Nikola Srezentić, SAP Vojvodina delegate (fl. 1973–86).

== Sources ==
- Вукмановић, Јован (1960). Паштровићи: антропогеографско-етнолошка испитивања. Obod.
- Petrović, Mihailo (1941). Đerdapski ribolovi u prošlosti i u sadašnjosti. Vol. 39. Izd. Zadužbine Mikh. R. Radivojeviča. p. 198.
