= Ministry of Labor and Social Welfare =

Ministry of Labor and Social Welfare may refer to:

- Ministry of Labor and Social Welfare (Chile), a government department in Chile
- Ministry of Labor and Social Welfare (Guatemala), a government department in Guatemala
- Ministry of Labor and Social Welfare (Montenegro), a government department in Montenegro
- Ministry of Labor and Social Welfare (Uruguay), a government department in Uruguay
