= Dukaj =

Dukaj is a surname. Notable people with the surname include:

- Jacek Dukaj, Polish science fiction and fantasy writer
- Marash Dukaj (born 1985), Montenegrin politician
