= Ministry of Health (Montenegro) =

Government ministry of Montenegro

- Ministarstvo zdravlja

Agency overview
- Formed: 2006
- Jurisdiction: Government of Montenegro
- Headquarters: Podgorica
- Agency executive: Dragoslav Šćekić, Minister of Health of Montenegro
- Website: mzd.gov.me

Minister of Health (Montenegrin: Ministar zdravlja) is the person in charge of the Ministry of Health of Montenegro (Ministarstvo zdravlja). Dragoslav Šćekić is the current Minister of Health, since 4 December 2020.

== Ministers of Health, since 2006 ==
Democratic Party of Socialists Social Democrats Non-party

Minister	Start of term	End of term
Miodrag Radunović	10 November 2006	14 March 2015
Budimir Šegrt	14 March 2015	28 November 2016
Kenan Hrapović	28 November 2016	4 December 2020
Jelena Borovinić	4 December 2020	28 April 2022
Dragoslav Šćekić	28 April 2022	incumbent
