= Akropolis: Journal of Hellenic Studies =

- Discipline: Hellenic studies
- Language: English; Serbian
- Edited by: Filip Ivanović

Publication details
- History: 2017–present
- Publisher: Center for Hellenic Studies (Montenegro)
- Frequency: Annually
- Open access: Yes

Standard abbreviations
- ISO 4: Akropolis

Indexing
- ISSN: 2536-572X (print); 2536-5738 (web)
- OCLC no.: 1038392187

Links
- Journal homepage

Akropolis: Journal of Hellenic Studies is an annual open access peer-reviewed academic journal devoted to the study of Hellenic culture and civilization from antiquity to the present. It was established in 2017 and is published by the Center for Hellenic Studies, based in Podgorica.

The journal publishes original research articles and book reviews in all areas of Hellenic studies: philosophy, religion, archaeology, history, law, politics, literature, philology, art.

The editor in chief is Filip Ivanović, and associate editor is Mikonja Knežević.

Akropolis is abstracted and/or indexed in a number of databases, including Scopus, ERIH Plus, The Philosopher's Index, DOAJ, and others.

According to Scimago Journal Rank, Akropolis is ranked as Q4 in Classics for 2020 and 2021.
