= Rafet Husović =

Montenegrin politician (1964–2021)

Rafet Husović Рафет Хусовић
- Husović in December 2011

Deputy Prime Minister
- In office 4 December 2012 – 4 December 2020
- Prime Minister: Milo Đukanović; Duško Marković
- Succeeded by: Dritan Abazović

Minister Without Portfolio
- In office 10 June 2009 – 4 December 2012
- Prime Minister: Milo Đukanović; Igor Lukšić
- Succeeded by: Marija Vučinović

Personal details
- Born: 2 April 1964 Rožaje, SR Montenegro, SFR Yugoslavia
- Died: 9 March 2021 (aged 56) Podgorica, Montenegro
- Party: SDA (1990–1997); BS (2006–2021)
- Education: University of Pristina
- Profession: Politician, teacher

Rafet Husović (Bosnian Cyrillic: Рафет Хусовић; 2 April 1964 – 9 March 2021) was a Montenegrin Bosnian politician, who served as the Deputy Prime Minister of Montenegro. He was the founder and long-term president of the centre-right Bosniak Party, an ethnic minority party for promotion of interests of Bosniaks.

== Biography ==
=== Early life and education ===
Rafet Husović was born in Rožaje to a family of Bosniak origin, a town in northeastern Montenegro, at that time part of the SR Montenegro of SFR Yugoslavia. Having finished elementary and secondary school in his hometown, he graduated at the Faculty of Natural Sciences in Pristina, SAP Kosovo, after which he worked for years as a math teacher in his hometown of Rožaje.

=== Political career ===
After the introduction of the multi-party system in Montenegro in 1990, he joined the branch of the right-wing Party of Democratic Action in Republic of Montenegro (SDA CG), where he was part of party's moderate wing and a member of the main board from 1992 to 1997 and the party's dissolution due police repression. Between 1997 and 2002, he was a member of the Main Board of the International Democratic Union (IDU). From 2002 to 2006 he was a member of the Bosniak National Council of the State Union of Serbia and Montenegro (BNV SCG). He was one of the founders and head of parliamentary group in Rožaje local parliament of the Bosniak-Muslim Alliance, which in February 2006 merged with other Bosniak and Muslim parties in Montenegro to form the Bosniak Party (BS), of which Husović was president from its founding, holding leadership post until February 2021, when he retired from politics due to health problems.

He was a Minister Without Portfolio in the 6th cabinet of Milo Đukanović (2009–2010) and the cabinet of Igor Lukšić (2010–2012). In December 2012, Husović was appointed Deputy Prime Minister in the 7th cabinet of Đukanović (2012–2016).

Following the 2016 parliamentary election in Montenegro, the opposition right-wing populist Democratic Front (DF) which did not recognized the results of the election, made a public offer to Husović, such that if he and his party joined the Democratic Front, he would push for Husović to be selected as the new provisional Prime Minister of Montenegro. Husović's Bosniak Party voted on whether to join the DF or to remain in a coalition with the Democratic Party of Socialists (DPS), and the party ended up voting to stay as a partner to DPS, ultimately rejecting opposition bid. After election, Husović kept the Deputy Prime Minister for Regional Development position in another DPS-led cabinet, with new PM, Duško Marković (2016–2020).

=== Illness and death ===
Rafet Husović died on 9 March 2021, at the age of 56, after a short, but severe illness. The Mayor of Rožaje, Rahman Husović, declared three days of mourning in that municipality following Rafet Husović's death.
