= Ministry of Public Administration, Digital Society and Media (Montenegro) =

Government ministry of Montenegro

- Ministarstvo javne uprave, digitalnog društva i medija u Vladi Crne Gore

Agency overview
- Formed: 2016 (2020)
- Jurisdiction: Government of Montenegro
- Headquarters: Podgorica
- Agency executive: Tamara Srzentić, Minister of Public Administration, Digital Society and Media
- Website: mju.gov.me

Minister of Public Administration (Montenegrin: Ministar javne uprave) is the person in charge of the Ministry of Public Administration of Montenegro (Ministarstvo javne uprave). Tamara Srzentić, an independent politician is the current Minister of Public Administration, since 4 December 2020.

== Ministers (2016–present) ==
Democratic Party of Socialists Independent

Minister	Start of term	End of term
Duško Marković^{[a]}	12 May 2016	28 November 2016
Suzana Pribilović	28 November 2016	4 December 2020
Tamara Srzentić	4 December 2020	Incumbent

^{a} Deputy Prime Minister for Administration, Internal and Foreign Policy
