= 2027 in politics =

The following political events are scheduled to occur in 2027.

== Predicted and scheduled events ==
- January 30 – 2027 German presidential election will be held.
- February 28 – The 2027 Salvadoran legislative election will be held.
- February 28 – The 2027 Salvadoran presidential election will be held.
- April – French presidential election will be held.
- April 18 – 2027 Finnish parliamentary election will be held.
- August 10 – The 2027 Kenyan general election will be held. Incumbent president William Ruto will be eligible for reelection.
- October 24 – The 2027 Argentine general election will be held.
- November 7 – If not triggered earlier, the next Polish parliamentary election will occur no later than this date.
- December 22 – If not triggered earlier, the next Italian general election will occur no later than this date.

=== Date unknown ===
- The autonomous region of Bougainville in Papua New Guinea aims to gain independence by this year per an agreement made in 2021.
- The 2027 Andorran parliamentary election will be held.
- The 2027 Nigerian general election will be held.
- The next Greek parliamentary election must take place by this year.
- The next Estonian parliamentary election must take place by this year.
- The 2027 Montenegrin parliamentary election must take place by this year.
- The next Slovak parliamentary election must take place by this year.
- The next Papua New Guinean general election must take place by this year.
- The 2027 Guatemalan general election will be held.
- The 2027 Nicaraguan general election will be held.
- The 2027 Dominican general election will be held.
- The 2027 Grenadian general election will be held.
- The next Lesotho general election will be held.
- The next Chinese Communist Party election will be held.
