= Palace of Zeta Banovina =

- Palata Zetske banovine
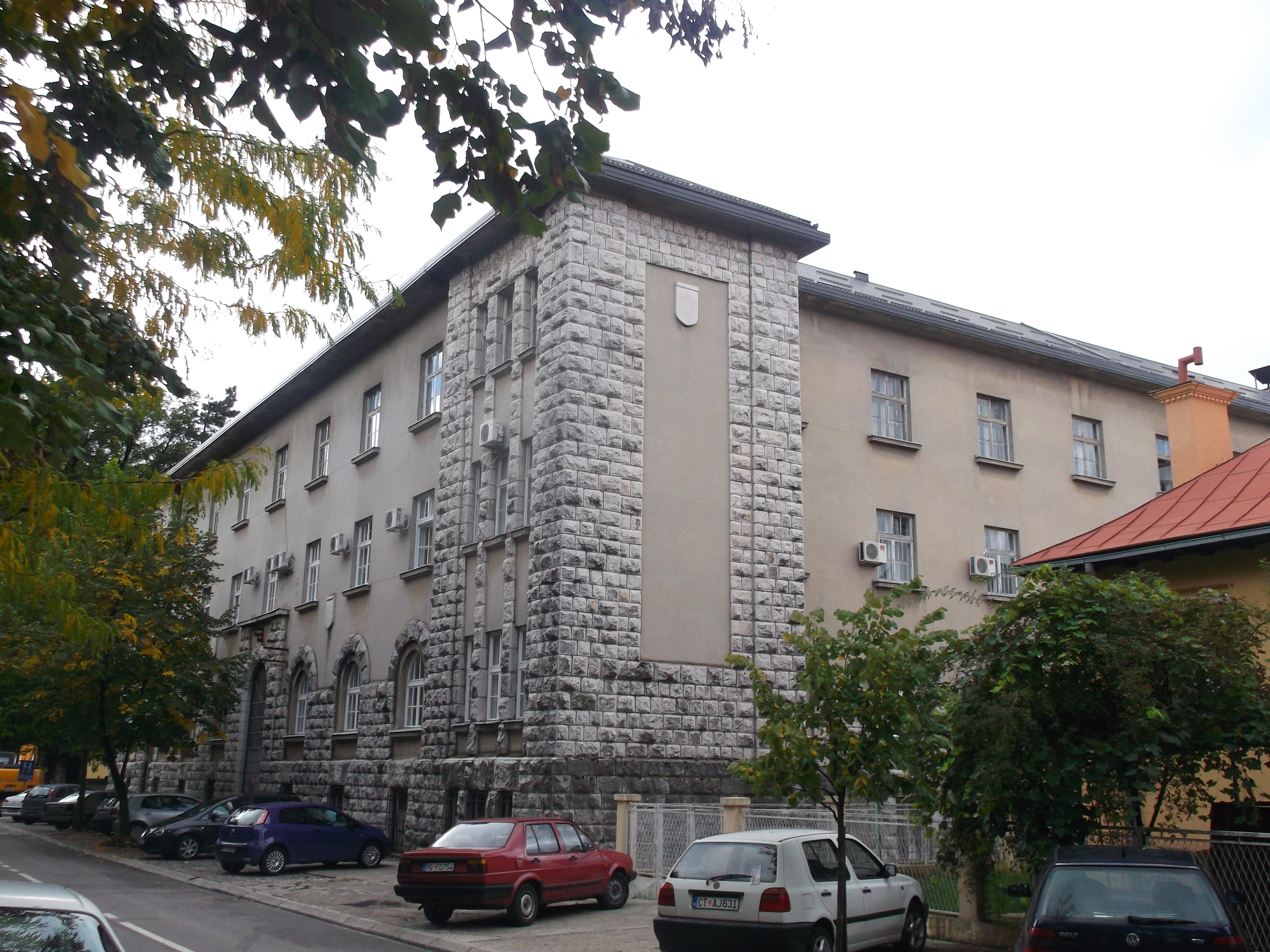
- Interactive map of the Palace of Zeta Banovina area

General information
- Location: Cetinje, Montenegro
- Coordinates: 42°23′18″N 18°55′40″E
- Year built: 1932
- Completed: 1932; 94 years ago
- Owner: City of Cetinje

The Palace of Zeta Banovina (Montenegrin: Palata Zetske banovine) in Cetinje, Montenegro is a representative building housing the city administration of the Old Royal Capital Cetinje. The building was completed in 1932 as the seat of the Zeta Banovina. The building was designed by White Russian émigré architect Nikola Kirsanov who designed many other representative buildings in the Kingdom of Yugoslavia. The fourth session of the Montenegrin Anti-Fascist Assembly of National Liberation on 15-17 April of 1945 took place in the building. Since 2024 the building is used in the logo of the Parliament of Montenegro.

== History ==
The palace was constructed in 1932 during the interwar period, designed by Russian émigré architect Nikolai Petrovich Krasnov (1864–1939). It was built following the 1929 territorial reorganization of the Kingdom of Yugoslavia, when nine new banovinas were established, and served as the administrative seat of the Zeta Banovina.

The first session of the Zeta Banovina council was held in December 1930 in Cetinje Sloboda Dom where the need for a purpose built administrative building was raised. The project was entrusted to Russian émigré architect Nikolai Petrovich Krasnov, renowned for his monumental public buildings in Belgrade, who was assisted by architect Radmila Jevrić.

In 2024 Speaker of the Parliament of Montenegro Andrija Mandić announced a change to the Parliament's visual identity, unveiling a new logo featuring the Palace of Zeta Banovina which at one point housed key institutions of the Republic of Montenegro. He said the choice was meant to honour Cetinje as the country's historic capital. Opposition MPs criticized the decision. Democratic Party of Socialists of Montenegro MP Andrija Nikolić questioned the legal authority to change the logo and argued that invoking the Zeta Banovina symbol recalls a period when Montenegro lost its name.

== See also ==
- Parliament of Montenegro
- Zetski dom
- Zeta (river)
