= Ministry of Sports and Youth (Montenegro) =

Government ministry of Montenegro

- Ministarstvo sporta i mladih

Agency overview
- Formed: 2016
- Jurisdiction: Government of Montenegro
- Headquarters: Podgorica
- Agency executive: Vasilije Lalošević, Minister of Sports and Youth
- Website: ms.gov.me

Minister of Sports and Youth (Montenegrin: Ministar sporta i mladih) was the person in charge of the Ministry of Sports and Youth of Montenegro (Ministarstvo sporta i mladih). Prior to 2016, the Minister of Education and Sports (Ministarstvo prosvjete i sporta) was in charge of youth and sports affairs. In 2020, Ministry once again merged into the Ministry of Education. It was once again re-established in 2022.

== Ministers of Sports and Youth (2016-2020) ==
Democratic Party of Socialists Non-partisan

Minister	Start of term	End of term
Nikola Janović	28 November 2016	4 December 2020
Vasilije Lalošević	28 April 2022	incumbent
