= Marija Vučinović =

Montenegrin engineer and politician (born 1958)

Minister Without Portfolio
- In office 4 December 2012 – 4 December 2020
- Prime Minister: Milo Đukanović; Duško Marković
- Succeeded by: Zoran Miljanić (2022)

Personal details
- Born: 30 January 1958 (age 68) Rijeka, PR Croatia, FPR Yugoslavia
- Party: HGI (2002–2020); HRS (since 2020)
- Education: University of Rijeka
- Occupation: Nautical engineer, politician

Marija Vučinović (Cyrillic: Марија Вучиновић; born 30 January 1958) is a Montenegrin Croat nautical engineer and politician, Minister Without Portofolio in the Government of Montenegro in two terms, and former Member of the Parliament. She was one of founders and a former leader of the centre-right minority politics party Croatian Civic Initiative (HGI), which she left in 2020.

== Career ==
Born in Rijeka, Croatia, she graduated from the Faculty of Engineering - Department of Shipbuilding and Graduated Engineer of Shipbuilding. She worked for sixteen years in the Adriatic shipyard in Bijela in the construction office, in the affairs of the chief constructor and as head of the office. Since 2005 she has been the president of the Croatian Civil Initiative party and is a member of the Croatian - Montenegrin interstate council. She was a member of the Croatian National Council of the Republic of Montenegro.

== Politics ==
=== Croatian Civic Initiative ===
She serves as Minister Without Portofolio since she was appointed by Prime Minister Milo Đukanović on 4 December 2012 and re-appointed by Duško Marković on 28 November 2016. She had been a member of the Parliament in the minority Croatian group and the president of the Croatian Civic Initiative (HGI), a party that brings together Croats in Montenegro.

=== Croatian Reform Party ===
In February 2019, following ideological disagreements with the HGI membership, Vucinovic was removed from the post of party president by the party's main board, remaining a minister in the Montenegrin government. Eventually she left party prior the 2020 Montenegrin parliamentary election. In July 2020 she became one of the founders of the new Croatian minority interests Croatian Reform Party (Hrvatska Reformska Stranka, HRS), established when the centrist faction of the HGI defected from the party, and formed new political subject. At the first party congress, Vucinovic was elected president of the new party. A newly formed party ran independently at the 2020 elections, competing for one Croatian parliamentary seat with the HGI.
