= Hellenic studies =

Academic discipline focused on post-classical Greece

Hellenic studies (also Greek studies) is an interdisciplinary scholarly field that focuses on the language, literature, history and politics of post-classical Greece. In university, a wide range of courses expose students to viewpoints that help them understand the historical and political experiences of Byzantine, Ottoman and modern Greece; the ways in which Greece has borne its several pasts and translated them into the modern era; and the era's distinguished literary and artistic traditions.

== History ==
"Hellenic" refers to a period in Ancient Greek history between 507 BC (the date of the establishment of democracy in Athens) and 323 BCE (the death of Alexander the Great). This period included later parts of Archaic Greece and the whole of Classical Greece (480-323 BC) and should not be confused with The Hellenistic World, which designates the period between Alexander's death and the Roman Empire's conquest of Greece (323-146/31 BC). The Hellenic World of ancient Greece consisted of the Greek mainland, Crete, the islands of the Greek archipelago, Cyprus, Pontus, the coast of Asia Minor primarily (though mention is made of cities within the interior of Asia Minor) and the colonies in southern Italy. This is the great Golden Age of Greece and, in the popular imagination, resonates as 'ancient Greece'.

The great law-giver, Solon, having served as Archon of Athens for 22 years, retired from public life and saw the city, almost immediately, fall under the dictatorship of Peisistratus. Though a dictator, Peisistratus understood Solon's wisdom, carried on his policies and after his death, his son Hippias continued this tradition (though maintaining a dictatorship that favored the aristocracy). His younger brother was assassinated (inspired, according to Thucydides, by a love affair gone wrong and not, as later thought, politically motivated) Hippias then became wary of the Athenians, instituted a rule of terror and was finally overthrown by the army under Kleomenes I of Sparta and Cleisthenes of Athens. Cleisthenes reformed the Athenian constitution and established democracy in the city during 507 BC. He also followed Solon's lead, but instituted new laws that decreased the artistocracy's power, raised the status of the common people and attempted to join the separate tribes of the mountain, the plain and the shore into one, unified people under a new form of government. According to Will Durant, "The Athenians themselves were exhilarated by this adventure into sovereignty...they knew the zest of freedom in action, speech and thought; and from that moment they began to lead all Greece in literature and art, even in statesmanship and war". This foundation of democracy, of a free state consisting of men who "owned the soil that they tilled and who ruled the state that governed them", stabilized Athens and provided the groundwork for the Golden Age.

The list of thinkers, writers, doctors, artists, scientists, statesmen and warriors of the Hellenic World important contributions to western civilization: The statesman Solon, poets Pindar and Sappho, playwrights Sophocles, Euripides, Aeschylus and Aristophanes, the orator Lysias, historians Herodotus and Thucydides, philosophers Zeno of Elea, Protagoras of Abdera, Empedocles of Acragas, Heraclitus, Xenophanes, Socrates, Plato and Aristotle, writer and general Xenophon, physician Hippocrates, sculptor Phidias, statesman Pericles, generals Alcibiades, Themistocles, Leonidas, Pausanias the Regent, Cimon, Pericles, Agesilaus II, Epaminondas, Philip, Alexander the Great and many more lived during this period. The Golden Age, according to the poet Shelley, "is undoubtedly...the most memorable in the history of the world" for the accomplishments and advancements made by the people of that time. Herodotus considered his own age as lacking in many ways and looked back to a more ancient past for a paradigm of a true greatness. The writer Hesiod, an 8th-century BC contemporary of Homer, claimed precisely the same thing about the age Herodotus admired and called his own age "wicked, depraved and dissolute" and hoped the future would produce a better breed of man for Greece.

== Geography ==
Major city-states and sacred places of pilgrimage in the Hellenic World were Argos, Athens, Eleusis, Corinth, Delphi, Ithaca, Olympia, Sparta, Thebes, Dodona, Dion, Pella, Aigai, Thrace and Mount Olympus, the home of the gods. The gods played an important part in the lives of the people; so much so that one could face execution for questioning - or even allegedly questioning - their existence, as in the case of Protagoras, Socrates and Alcibiades (the Athenian statesman Critias, sometimes referred to as `the first atheist', only escaped condemnation because he was so powerful). Great works of art and beautiful temples were created for the worship and praise of the various gods and goddesses of the Greeks such as the Parthenon of Athens, dedicated to the goddess Athena Parthenos (Athena the Virgin) and the Temple of Zeus (listed as an Ancient Wonder) at Olympia (both works to which Phidias contributed). The temple of Demeter at Eleusis was the site of the famous Eleusinian Mysteries and is considered the most important rite in ancient Greece. In his works, The Iliad and The Odyssey, immensely popular and influential in the Hellenic World, Homer depicted the gods and goddesses as intimately involved in the lives of the people. The deities were regularly consulted in domestic matters as well as affairs of state. The Oracle at Delphi was considered so important at the time that people from all over the known world came to Greece to ask advice or favors from the god. It was considered vital to consult with the supernatural forces before embarking on any military campaign.

Among the famous battles of the Hellenic World were the Battle of Marathon (490 BC), the Battles of Thermopylae, Salamis (480 BC), Plataea (479 BC), Battle of the Eurymedon (469/466 BC), Battle of the Prosoptis (454 BC), Battle of Naupactus (429 BC), Battle of Mantinea (418 BC), Battle of Aeogospotami (405 BC) , Battle of Tegyra (375 BC) , Battle of Leuctra (374 BC) , Battle of the Crocus field (353/352 BC) and the Battle of Chaeronea (338 BC) where the forces of the Macedonian King Philip II commanded, in part, by his son Alexander, defeated the forces of a Greek coalition led by Athens and Thebes and unified the Greek city-states into the Hellenic League. After Philip's death, Alexander conquered the world of his day, becoming Alexander the Great. His campaigns brought Greek culture, language and civilization to the world and, after his death, left the legacy that came to be known as the Hellenistic World.

== University programs ==
=== Brown University ===
Brown University's Committee of Modern Greek Studies sponsors the Department Of Classics Language instruction began in 1972. Instruction in Modern Greek literature and history began in 1995.

=== Columbia University ===
Columbia University offers Hellenic Studies with an undergraduate curriculum in Modern Greek and Greek Diaspora Studies. Students are encouraged to study abroad in Greece to further their academic studies and professional work.

=== University of Florida ===
The University of Florida's Center for Greek Studies brings together under one aegis the various UF courses and programs that deal with Greece past and present, to promote the values of Greek civilization and to assist local citizens in their interactions with Greece.

=== University of Indianapolis ===
The University of Indianapolis' Office of Hellenic Studies offers a Study Abroad Program.

=== University of Maryland ===
The University of Maryland, College Park's Classics Department has offered courses in Ancient and Modern Greek since 1989 and offers a minor in Greek Language and Culture. The school offers a study abroad course in Greece, “History and Archaeology of Corinth”, providing archaeological fieldwork. UMD hosts an annual Annual Modern Greek Studies Conference; the 5th Annual conference in 2021 discussed the meaning of "Democracy in Hellenism and in the West".

=== University of Missouri–St. Louis ===
The University of Missouri–St. Louis hosts a Greek Studies program including a Hellenic Government-Karakas Foundation Professorship in Greek Studies. Its mission is to focus, develop and sustain research, teaching and public education on Hellenism.

=== Johns Hopkins University ===
Johns Hopkins University publishes a Journal of Modern Greek Studies. The journal publishes critical analyses of Greek social, cultural and political affairs, covering the period from the late Byzantine Empire to the present.

=== New York University ===
NYU's A.S. Onassis Program in Hellenic Studies offers a comprehensive and interdisciplinary understanding of the language, literature, history and politics of post-classical Greece. Students are exposed to multiple viewpoints that help them understand the historical and political experiences of Byzantium, Ottoman Empire and modern Greece; the ways that Greece has borne its pasts and translated them into the modern era; and Greece's literary and artistic traditions of a country.

The university's Bobst Library is home to two endowed collections of Hellenic Studies: the Papamarkou Library of Byzantine and Medieval Greek Books and the Vardinoyannis Library of Hellenic Civilizations. "NYU in Athens" gives students the opportunity to study in Greece.

=== Princeton University ===
Princeton's Program in Hellenic Studies was established in 1979.

=== Sacramento State University ===
Hellenic Studies at Sacramento State University emphasizes coursework and independent study in the areas of the Greek language, Greek History, Greek politics, and Greek arts and literature. The Hellenic Studies curriculum includes lower and upper-division classes offered by the departments of Foreign Languages, History, Humanities, and Religious Studies, Philosophy, Government, and Art. The minor is associated with the Tsakopoulos Hellenic Collection in the Sacramento State Library.

=== Simon Fraser University ===
Hellenic Studies began at SFU in 1996 with the establishment of the Hellenic Canadian Congress of British Columbia Chair in Hellenic Studies, made possible by donations from the Hellenic Community of Vancouver with matching funds from the province of British Columbia. The inaugural chair-holder, Dr. André Gerolymatos, has since worked to secure more funding and resources to expand the discipline at SFU.

=== Yale University ===
Yale's Hellenic Studies Program was established in July 2001. It organizes lectures, symposia, conferences and supports faculty and student scholarly activities, as well as cultural events. It offers a program of instruction in modern Greek at the elementary, intermediate and advanced levels and cooperates closely with Yale's Center for Language Study on the development of teaching aids. The Program offers courses in modern Greek literature and culture as well as in Ottoman and modern Greek history.

=== York University ===
York's Hellenic Studies Program began on January 28, 2000.

== Libraries ==
Harvard University Libraries possess the richest collection in Hellenic studies, in particular Modern Greek fiction of last decade, followed by Columbia University Libraries, Princeton University Library and University of Michigan Library. The Rakus Family Hellenic Studies Collection at the University of Washington Libraries is a developing collection in Hellenic studies. Φυσιογνωμία: αλλοιωμένη αλήθεια (Physiognomy: distorted truth) by Nikos Toumaras is the most widely distributed Greek fiction title in libraries of the last decade.

== Journals ==
- Akropolis: Journal of Hellenic Studies
- Journal of Hellenic Studies
- Revue des Études Grecques

== See also ==
- Balkan studies
- Byzantine studies
- Center for Hellenic Studies
- Classical Greece
- Modern Greek studies
