= Ministry of Labor and Social Welfare (Montenegro) =

Government ministry of Montenegro

- Ministarstvo rada i socijalnog staranja

Agency overview
- Formed: 2006
- Jurisdiction: Government of Montenegro
- Headquarters: Podgorica
- Agency executive: Admir Adrović, Minister of Labor and Social Welfare
- Website: mrs.gov.me

Minister of Labor and Social Welfare (Montenegrin: Ministar rada i socijalnog staranja) is the person in charge of the Ministry of Labor and Social Welfare of Montenegro (Ministarstvo rada i socijalnog staranja). In 2020, Ministry merged into the Ministry of Finance and Social Welfare. It was re-established in 2022.

== Ministers of Labor and Social Welfare, 2006–2020; 2022–present ==
Democratic Party of Socialists Bosniak Party Non-party

| Minister | Start of term | End of term |
|---|---|---|
| Suad Numanović | 10 November 2006 | 4 December 2012 |
| Predrag Bošković | 4 December 2012 | 12 May 2016 |
| Boris Marić | 12 May 2016 | 28 November 2016 |
| Kemal Purišić | 28 November 2016 | 4 December 2020 |
| Admir Adrović | 28 April 2022 | Incumbent |
