= Milan Knežević (Montenegrin politician) =

Montenegrin politician

Milan Knežević Милан Кнежевић
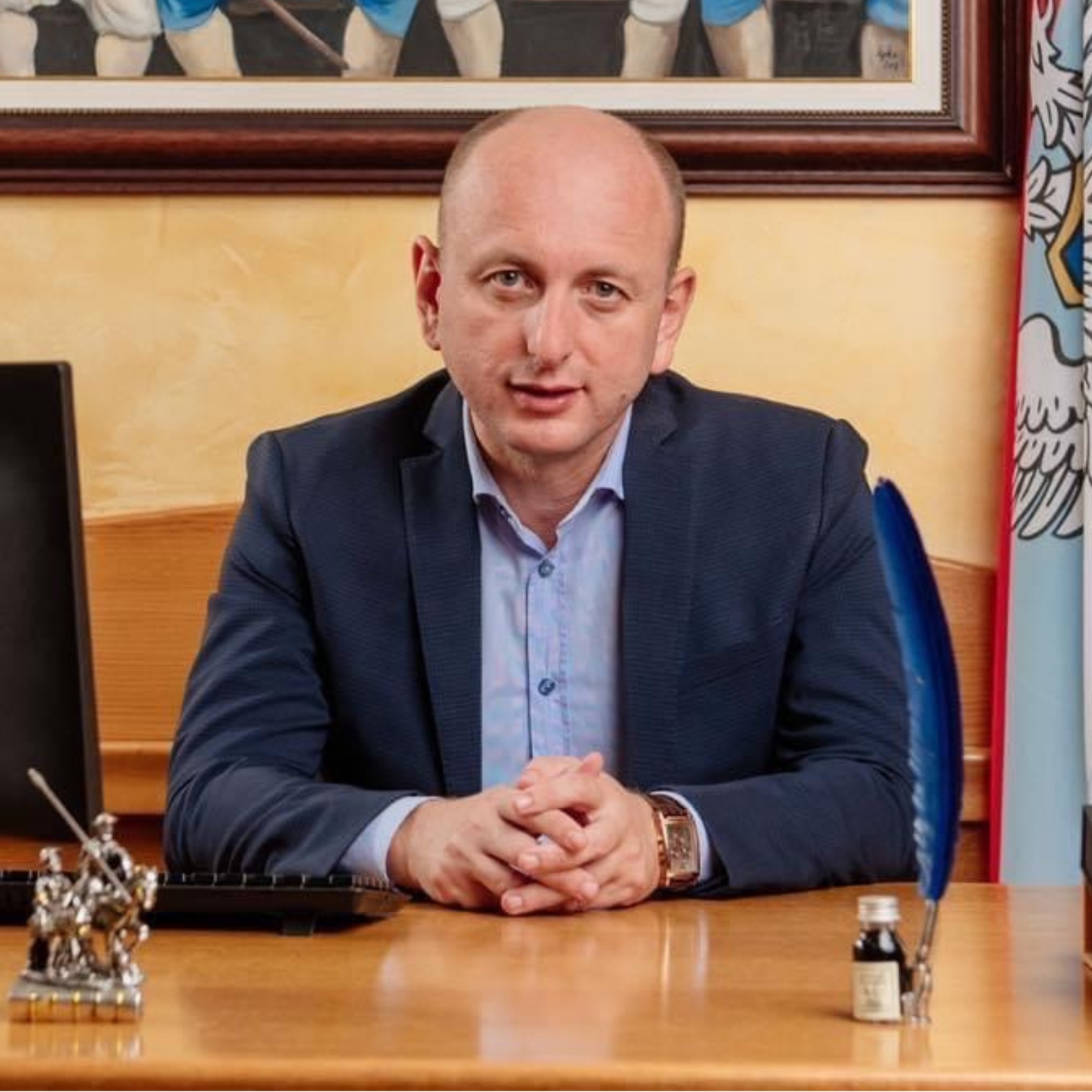
- Milan Knežević in January 2020.

Member of Parliament
- Incumbent
- Assumed office 29 March 2009
- President: Ranko Krivokapić; Darko Pajović; Ivan Brajović; Aleksa Bečić

Personal details
- Born: 24 March 1980 (age 46) Titograd, SFR Yugoslavia
- Party: Democratic People's Party (2012–present); Socialist People's Party (until 2012)
- Education: University of Montenegro
- Profession: Politician

Milan Knežević (Serbian Cyrillic: Милан Кнежевић; born 24 March 1980) is a Montenegrin politician and poet. He is the founder and current president of the right-wing Democratic People's Party, a member of presidency of the opposition Democratic Front alliance, current member of the Parliament of Montenegro and the President of the Parliamentary Board for Defence and Security.

== Biography ==
=== Private life ===
He was born to a Serb family in 1980 in Titograd (Podgorica). Having finished elementary and secondary school in Podgorica, Knežević graduated Serbian language and South Slavic literature at the Faculty of Philosophy in Nikšić. He is fluent in Serbian, English and Russian language.

On 13 November 2020, it was announced that Knežević had contracted COVID-19.

=== Political life ===
He decided to enter political life in the mid-2000s by joining Srđan Milić's Socialist People's Party (SNP), in which he was one of the representatives in the parliament of Montenegro. Before the 2012 parliamentary election, the right-wing faction of the SNP led by Knežević and their former president Predrag Bulatović left the party and joined the Democratic Front (DF) alliance independently.

After the election Knežević remained a representative in the assembly. In November 2015, he was elected President of the newly formed populist Democratic People's Party (DNP).

=== Trial over alleged coup ===
On 15 February 2017, Knežević was stripped of his parliamentary immunity in connection with an ongoing criminal prosecution against him. On 8 June 2017, the High Court in Podgorica confirmed the indictment of Milan Knežević, along with thirteen other persons, including two Russian nationals and Andrija Mandić, on charges that included "preparing a conspiracy against the constitutional order and the security of Montenegro" and an "attempted terrorist act."

On 18 October 2017, Knezevic was sentenced to seven months in prison, for attacking a policeman on 17 October 2015 in front of the Parliament building, during the Democratic Front protests. After being found guilty, Knezevic said that the verdict was an indicator of trapped state institutions, particularly judicial ones, and announced that he would appeal against the court's judgement.

In February 2021, the Montenegrin appellate court overturned the first-instance verdict against Knežević and the other defendants, and ordered a retrial. On July 12, 2024, the High Court in Podgorica acquitted Milan Knežević and all other defendants charged with organizing and preparing the alleged 2016 coup d'état.

=== Incident at the Airport Podgorica ===
On 7 December 2022, in front of the airport Podgorica main building, Milan Knežević with his bodyguard, first verbally and then physically attacked a man in his twenties who supposedly had previously verbally insulted Milan. Both involved parties agreed not to press charges against each other. Soon after, Milan Knežević made numerous media statements, saying that he had been verbally and physically attacked because he was a Serb and that he intended to arm his family because he and his family didn't feel safe. Soon after the airport released the security video footage of the incident.

=== Persona non grata declaration ===
On 25 July 2024, Knežević, along with president of Parliament Andrija Mandić and deputy prime minister Aleksa Bečić were declared persona non grata by Croatia following the passage of a resolution in the Parliament of Montenegro recognising a genocide in the Jasenovac concentration camp committed by the pro-Axis Independent State of Croatia during World War II.

== Works ==
Poetry collections

- Deponija snova (2007)
- Avlija bivših (2011)
- Dnevnik sitnih grehova (2014)
- Elektronska identifikacija birača (2016)
- Nijemi dijalozi (2017)
- Robijaški refreni (2020)

Novel

- Obala nesanice (2021)
