= Suzana Pribilović =

Montenegrin judge and politician

Suzana Pribilović (Serbian Cyrillic: Сузана Прибиловић; born 1972 in Cetinje) is a Montenegrin judge and politician who was the former Minister of Public Administration appointed by Duško Marković from 28 November 2016 until 4 December 2020. She is member of the Democratic Party of Socialists and was a member of the Parliament of Montenegro until 2016 until she returned to parliament again in the 2020 elections.

== Early life ==
Pribilović was born in 1972 in Cetinje. She graduated from the University of Belgrade where she studied law before she became secretariat. She was then, from 1998 to June 2004, the secretary for Parliamentary Affairs and Secretariat for Economy in Finance. In addition, during this time, she served in the cabinet of the president of the Budva Municipality. Afterward from 2004 to 2010 she served as a judge in the Court of Kotor, specializing in criminal cases. From 2010 until 2012 she practiced law at a firm, before being announced as President of the State Commission for the Control of Public Procurement Procedures in March 2012 which was a position she held until 2015. During her mandate for the State Commission, she drafted the Law on Public Procurement and conducted negotiations with the European Union.

In November 2015, it was announced by Srđa Popović that she would become Vice President of the Budva Municipality. Her appointment as Vice President was notable as the cabinet of Budva that was chosen by Popović had a historical rate of inclusion of women, which Popović said was his goal to balance equality. She left this position upon being appointed Minister of Public Administration in November 2015, which was a position she held until 2020. She worked towards integrating Montenegro with European Union standards and reorganized the management of human resources and civil servants.
