= Croatian Civic Initiative =

Croatian Civic Initiative Hrvatska građanska inicijativa
- President: Adrian Vuksanović
- Founder: Božo Nikolić; Marija Vučinović
- Founded: 28 August 2002
- Headquarters: Tivat, Montenegro
- Ideology: Social conservatism; Croat minority interests; Pro-Europeanism
- Political position: Centre-right
- National affiliation: European Montenegro (2006–2012)
- Parliament of Montenegro: 1 / 81

Website
- Official website

The Croatian Civic Initiative (Croatian/Montenegrin: Hrvatska građanska inicijativa, HGI, Montenegrin Cyrillic: Хрватска грађанска иницијатива, ХГИ) is a political party of the Croat minority in Montenegro.

== History ==
The party was formed in 2002. It first participated in local elections in Tivat municipality that year, and established its headquarters in this town. HGI has best electoral results in Boka region, because the Croat minority is concentrated mostly in municipalities of Tivat and Kotor. Marija Vučinović was party president from 2006, until 2019. At the 2009 legislative elections in Montenegro, Croatian Civic Initiative was a part of victorious Coalition for a European Montenegro, alongside DPS, SDP, DUA and the Bosniak Party.

HGI contested the 2012 legislative elections independently, and won 0.4% of votes, gaining one seat in the Parliament, because of the lower electoral threshold envisaged for the Croat minority, which has been set at 0.35%. The party entered a post-election coalition with ruling DPS and SDP. The party's sole parliamentary representative was Adrian Vuksanović, who was elected new president of the Party in 2019.

In February 2019, following ideological disagreements with the HGI membership, Marija Vučinović was removed from the post president by the party's main board, remaining a minister in the Montenegrin government. Eventually she left the party prior the 2020 Montenegrin parliamentary election. In July 2020 she became one of the founders of the new Croatian minority interests Croatian Reform Party, established when the centrist faction of the HGI defected from the party, and formed new political subject. At the first party congress, Vučinović was elected president of the new party. A newly formed party ran independently at the 2020 elections, competing for one Croatian parliamentary seat with the HGI. As there were two parties running represent interest o Croatian minority, they split votes, which led to no party crossing the 0.35% electoral threshold.

In April 2022, after the fall of Krivokapić Cabinet, a new government under Dritan Abazović was composed including Adrian Vuksanović as minister without portfolio. Vuksanović later resigned on 22 October 2022. In the 2023 Montenegrin parliamentary election, the HGI only accumulated 0.74% of all votes, gaining one seat in parliament. Following the election, the party remained in the opposition and was not included in the government led by Milojko Spajić.

== Electoral performance ==
=== Parliamentary elections ===
| Election | Party leader | Performance | | | | Alliance | Government |
| Election | Party leader | Votes | % | Seats | +/– | Alliance | Government |
|---|---|---|---|---|---|---|---|
| 2006 | Marija Vučinović | 164,737 | 48.62% | 1 / 81 | New | ECG | Support |
| 2009 | Marija Vučinović | 168,290 | 51.9% | 1 / 81 | 0 | ECG | Support |
| 2012 | Marija Vučinović | 1,470 | 0.40% | 1 / 81 | 0 | — | Coalition |
| 2016 | Marija Vučinović | 1,801 | 0.47% | 1 / 81 | 0 | — | Coalition |
| 2020 | Adrian Vuksanović | 1,106 | 0.27% | 0 / 81 | ▼1 | — | extra-parliamentary^{[a]} |
| 2023 | Adrian Vuksanović | 2,226 | 0.74% | 1 / 81 | ▲1 | — | Opposition |

Notes:

^{A} Extra-parliamentary (2020-2022); Government (April-October 2022); Extra-parliamentary (October 2022-)

== Related links ==
- Croatian Civic Society of Montenegro
