= Marash Dukaj =

Montenegrin politician (born 1985)

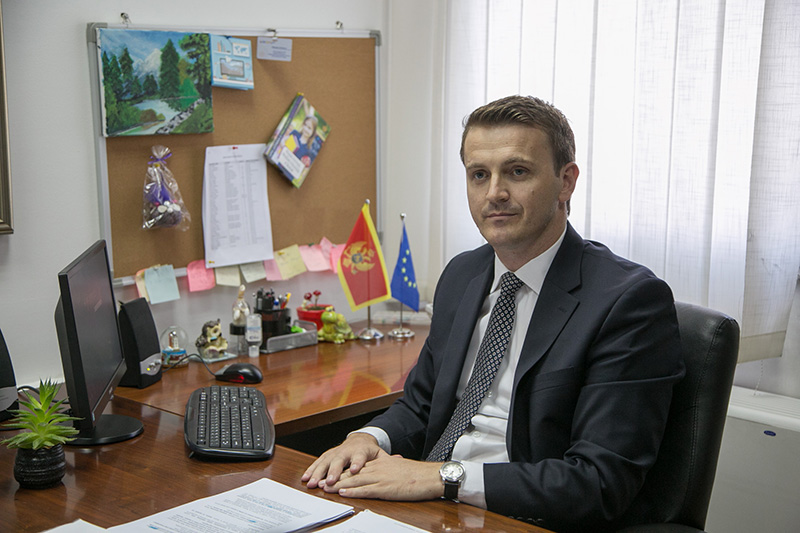
- Dukaj in 2022

Minister of Public Administration
- Incumbent
- Assumed office 28 April 2022
- Prime Minister: Dritan Abazović; Milojko Spajić
- Preceded by: Tamara Srzentić

Personal details
- Party: Albanian Alternative (since 2018)

Marash Dukaj (born 1985) is a Montenegrin politician. He is serving as the Minister of Public Administration in Montenegro since 22 April March 2022.

== Early life and career ==
Dukaj completed his primary and secondary education in Tuzi. He graduated at the Faculty of Education of the University of Montenegro and obtained a master's degree at the European University of Tirana, in Psychology. For many years he has served as an elementary school teacher in Tuzi, as well, he worked as a journalist and chief-editor at TV Boin. Subsequently, he was served as Deputy Minister in the Ministry of Education of Montenegro and held high ranking positions at the Tuzi Municipality. Among of his contributions was the introduction of the national Albanian alphabet book (Abetarja kombetare), as well as other important educational reforms benefiting minorities in Montenegro.

Since 2018 he serves as the political director of Albanian Alternative.

== See also ==
- Albanian Alternative
- Albanian List (Montenegro)
