= Filip Adžić =

Montenegrin politician

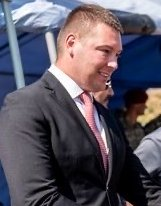

Filip Adžić (Montenegrin Cyrillic: Филип Аџић) is a Montenegrin politician.

Adžić was born in Cetinje, in the Socialist Republic of Montenegro, then part of the Socialist Federal Republic of Yugoslavia, in 1986. He is vice-president of United Reform Action, a green, socially liberal, and pro-European party.

Until 31 October 2023, he was the Minister of the Interior of Montenegro, appointed on 28 April 2022. He was also the country's acting Minister of Defense.
