= Ervin Ibrahimović =

Montenegrin politician

- Ервин Ибрахимовић
- Ibrahimović in 2026

Vice President of the Parliament of Montenegro
- Incumbent
- Assumed office 9 December 2021
- President: Aleksa Bečić

Leader of the Bosniak Party
- Incumbent
- Assumed office 13 June 2021
- Preceded by: Rafet Husović

Member of Parliament
- Incumbent
- Assumed office 16 October 2016
- President: Ivan Brajović; Aleksa Bečić

Deputy Prime Minister for International Relations and Foreign Affairs
- Incumbent
- Assumed office 23 July 2024
- Prime Minister: Milojko Spajić

Personal details
- Born: 7 June 1972 (age 54) Rožaje, SR Montenegro, SFR Yugoslavia
- Party: Bosniak Party
- Education: University of Pristina; University of Belgrade
- Profession: Politician

Ervin Ibrahimović (Bosnian Cyrillic: Ервин Ибрахимовић; born 7 June 1972) is a Montenegrin Bosniak politician serving as the vice president of the Parliament of Montenegro since December 2021 and the current president of the conservative Bosniak Party (BS), minority party representing Bosniaks in Montenegro, succeeding the party founder Rafet Husović in 2021.

== Biography ==
=== Early life and education ===
Ibrahimović was born on 7 June 1972 in Rožaje, a northern Montenegro town. He finished middle and high school in Rožaje, and later graduated from the Faculty of Metallurgy, University of Pristina. He has a master's degree from the University of Belgrade. In his youth, he played sports for many years and achieved notable result as a basketball coach in Rožaje and Tutin.

=== Political career ===
He served as the president of the Bosniak Party board in Rožaje, served as a member of the Municipal Parliament of Rožaje, and has been a member of the party presidency throughout the years. From 2011 to 2016 he served as the Consul at the Consulate General of Montenegro in Frankfurt, and has been a member of the Parliament of Montenegro since 2016. Ibrahimović was part of the selected group of officials and MPs who received loans and apartments from the state on favorable terms, as well as other benefits, causing controversy in the Montenegrin public. In December 2020, the Agency for the Prevention of Corruption determined that he violated the Law on the Prevention of Corruption. On 13 June 2021 he was elected new president of the Bosniak Party, succeeding Rafet Husović, first leader of the party after his death.

On 9 December 2021, Ibrahimović was elected vice president of the Parliament of Montenegro.

=== Personal life ===
In addition to his native Bosnian, Ibrahimović speaks English. He is married and is the father of two children.
