= Milojko Spajić =

Prime Minister of Montenegro since 2023

- Милојко Спајић
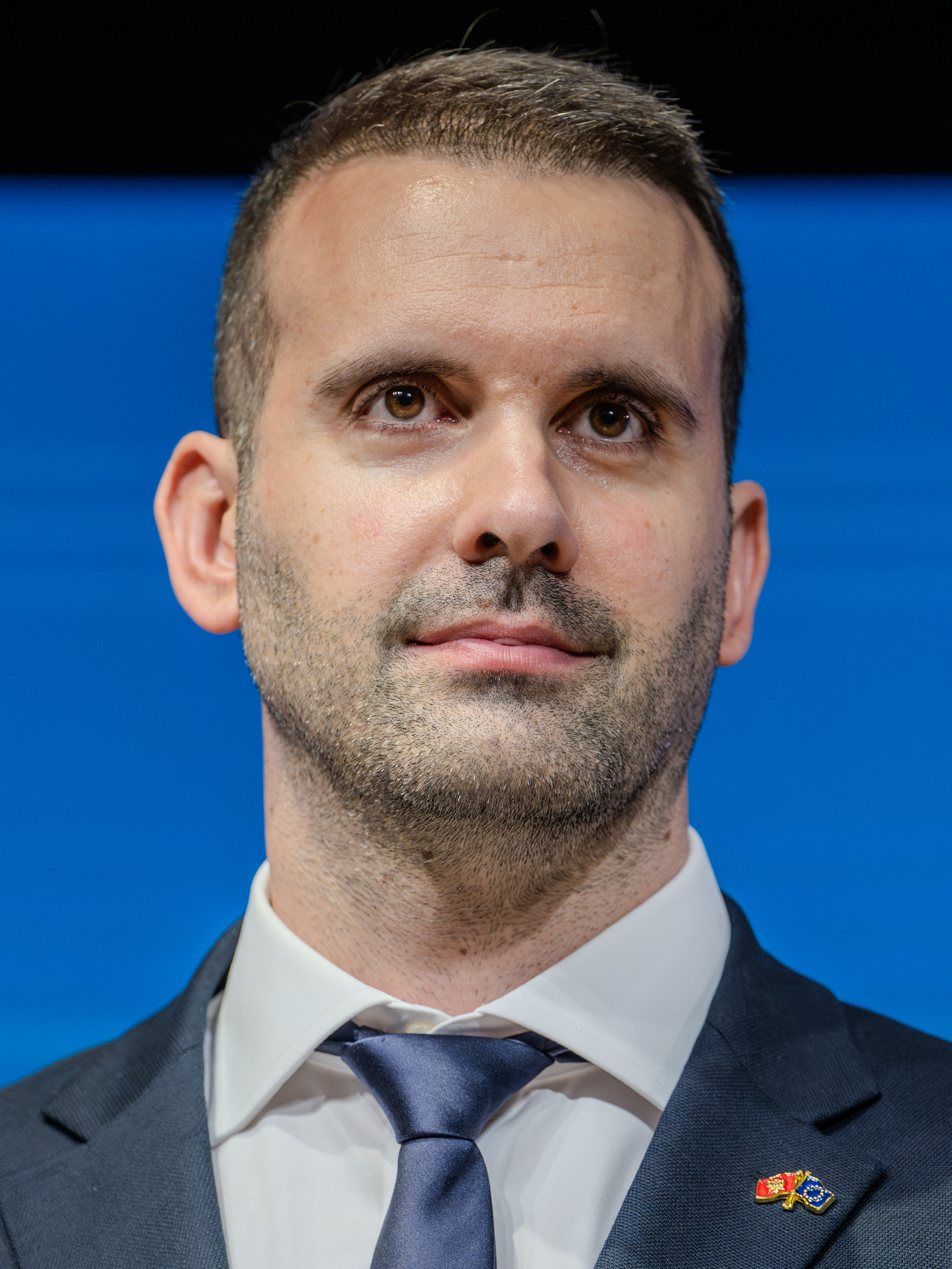
- Spajić in 2024

Prime Minister of Montenegro
- Incumbent
- Assumed office 31 October 2023
- President: Jakov Milatović
- Preceded by: Dritan Abazović

Member of Parliament
- In office 27 July 2023 – 31 October 2023

Minister of Finance and Social Welfare
- In office 4 December 2020 – 28 April 2022
- Prime Minister: Zdravko Krivokapić
- Preceded by: Darko Radunović (Finance); Kemal Purišić (Labor and Social Welfare)
- Succeeded by: Aleksandar Damjanović

Personal details
- Born: 24 September 1987 (age 38) Pljevlja, SR Montenegro, SFR Yugoslavia
- Party: Europe Now! (since 2022)
- Other political affiliations: Independent (until 2022)
- Spouse: Milena Tošić Spajić
- Children: 2
- Education: Saitama University (BA); HEC Paris (MSc)

Milojko Spajić (Montenegrin Cyrillic: Милојко Спајић; born 24 September 1987) is a Montenegrin politician serving as Prime Minister of Montenegro since October 2023. He previously served as minister of finance and social welfare in the Krivokapić Cabinet from 2020 to 2022. He is also the leader and co-founder of the Europe Now! Movement.

As of 2026, he is the fifth youngest serving state leader in the world, after Ibrahim Traoré of Burkina Faso, Daniel Noboa of Ecuador, Kristrún Frostadóttir of Iceland and Balen Shah of Nepal.

== Early life and education ==
Spajić was born on 24 September 1987 in Pljevlja, SR Montenegro, SFR Yugoslavia. His father, Vladimir Spajić, who died in 2024, was a dentist. His maternal uncle is Bishop Metodije Ostojić of the Serbian Orthodox Church. Spajić has an older brother, a dentist based in Los Angeles, California.

Spajić graduated from Pljevlja Gymnasium as one of its top students. He attended a Japanese preparatory program at the University of Osaka before attending the Saitama University, where he earned a bachelor's degree in econometrics in 2012. His studies in Japan were supported by the Monbukagakushō Scholarship from the Japanese government. During his undergraduate studies, he also completed an exchange semester at Tsinghua University in Beijing.

In 2013, Spajić obtained a master's degree in financial economics from HEC Paris, where he studied on scholarship.

== Business career ==
Spajić began his professional career as a private equity intern at Financial Liberty in Tokyo while an undergraduate student. Following the completion of his master's degree in France, he returned to Japan and joined Citibank as a trainee. In 2014, he moved to Singapore to work as a credit research analyst at Goldman Sachs.

After leaving Goldman Sachs in 2017, Spajić became a partner at Das Capital SG, a Singapore-based venture capital fund. He remained with the firm until 2020, when he returned to Montenegro and entered public service.

== Political career ==
=== 2020 parliamentary election ===
Spajić started his political career as a non-partisan politician and during the parliamentary elections in 2020 was a member of Zdravko Krivokapić's expert team. Spajić stated that there were several reasons for his return to Montenegro, but that the main one was the adoption of the disputed Law on Freedom of Religion and that the law shows how many problems have accumulated in the Montenegrin system. He added that until the situation improves, he would not "move" from Montenegro and that no investor would "trust in a state where an institution such as the Serbian Orthodox Church (SOC), which had existed for eight centuries and is trusted by most Montenegrin citizens, is getting its property seized by the government". During the religious crisis, he participated in lobbying in the United States for interests of the Serbian Orthodox Church and the Serbs of Montenegro.

=== Minister of Finance and Social Welfare ===
Spajic was sworn in as the minister of finance and social welfare on 4 December 2020 and served under Prime Minister Zdravko Krivokapić. During his term, Spajić and economy minister Jakov Milatović presented and implemented the controversial "Europe now" economic reform program. Following a parliamentary crisis, Prime Minister Krivokapić announced that he had submitted an initiative to the Parliament of Montenegro to remove Deputy Prime Minister Dritan Abazović and proposed that Spajić replaces him as the deputy prime minister. Spajić claimed that he donated his whole ministerial salary.

=== Europe Now! ===
In 2022, Spajić and Milatović founded the Europe Now (PES) political party, with Spajić as president and Milatović as deputy president. PES participated in the 2022 local elections.

=== 2023 elections ===
Spajić tried to run for President of Montenegro in the 2023 presidential election but his candidacy was rejected by the State Electoral Commission (DIK) as it was discovered that he is a dual citizen of Serbia and Montenegro. Following this discovery he stated he became a citizen of Serbia in 2009 and that the process of renouncing his Serbian citizenship is still ongoing. He later stated that he accepted Serbian citizenship so that he could travel to Japan without a visa. Instead of him, Milatović ran as PES candidate and ended up defeating incumbent president Milo Đukanović in the run-off with 58.88% of the popular vote.

Following the presidential election, Spajić said that he is ready to take responsibility and be PES's ballot carrier for the 2023 parliamentary election. On 26 April, it was confirmed that Spajić would head PES's electoral list. During the election campaign, Prime Minister Dritan Abazović and interior minister Filip Adžić accused Spajić of having connections to South Korean cryptocurrency developer Do Kwon who was arrested in Montenegro in March 2023. According to Abazović, Do Kwon sent a letter from prison which was addressed to Abazović, Adžić, justice minister Marko Kovač and main prosecutor Vladimir Novović, informing them of his connections to Spajić. PES denied the accusations against Spajić and stated that Do Kwon signed the letter under Abazović's orders. PES won around 25% of the popular vote in the parliamentary election, gaining the most seats in the Parliament of Montenegro. Following the election, Do Kwon denied that he ever financially backed Spajić.

On 10 August 2023, President Jakov Milatović gave Spajić a mandate to form the new government. On 30 August 2023, protests were held throughout Montenegro against Spajić and his plans to include the ethnic minority parties in the new government due to them being former coalition partners of the Democratic Party of Socialists (DPS) and for excluding the pro-Serbian coalition For the Future of Montenegro from the new government formation.

=== Prime Minister of Montenegro ===
On 31 October 2023, Montenegro's parliament approved a new government, with Spajić as Prime Minister.

Between May and June 2025, statements by Metropolitan Joanikije of Montenegro and Littoral of the Serbian Orthodox Church, in which he accused the government of persecuting Serbs and called Chetnik war criminal Pavle Đurišić "a great hero with an invincible character", were harshly criticized and condemned by Spajić, who distanced himself from the church's interference in government affairs.

Under Spajić's premiership, Montenegro advanced significantly towards European Union accession.

== Political positions ==
=== Foreign policy ===
Spajić supports the accession of Montenegro to the European Union but also thinks that Western politicians are "not interested in Montenegro". He claimed that joining NATO was a "good move for Montenegro", but that he would be opposed to deploying Montenegrin soldiers to the Baltic countries. Spajić condemned the Russian invasion of Ukraine, which he considers an aggression, and voiced his support for sanctioning Russia, even though he thinks that sanctions would only "strengthen Moscow on its way". Spajić is against the proposals of Montenegro revoking the recognition of Kosovo's independence, stating that he thinks that that is "one of the topics behind us". He advocates closer relations between Montenegro and Serbia.

== Personal life ==
Spajić has a daughter from a previous relationship. He is married to Milena Tošić Spajić, with whom he has a son, Vladimir, born in 2024.

He identifies himself as a Montenegrin by ethnicity, and speaks Serbo-Croatian. In addition to his native language, he also speaks English, Japanese, Chinese, Russian and French. He is a member of the Serbian Orthodox Church.

== See also ==
- List of current heads of state and government
- List of heads of the executive by approval rating
- List of state leaders by age#Youngest serving state leaders

Political offices
Preceded by Dritan Abazović	Prime Minister of Montenegro; 2023–present	Incumbent
