= Democratic People's Party (Montenegro) =

Montenegrin political party

Democratic People's Party Demokratska narodna partija Демократска народна партија
- Leader: Milan Knežević
- Founders: Milan Knežević; Predrag Bulatović
- Founded: September 2012 (citizen's group); 21 March 2015 (political party)
- Split from: Socialist People's Party
- Headquarters: Podgorica
- Ideology: Serbian–Montenegrin unionism; Social conservatism; Social democracy; Soft Russophilia
- Political position: Syncretic; Social: Right-wing; Economic: Centre-left
- National affiliation: For the Future of Montenegro
- Parliament: 3 / 81
- Local Parliaments: 37 / 844
- Mayors: 1 / 25

Website
- www.dnpcg.me

The Democratic People's Party (Serbian: Демократска народна партија, romanized: Demokratska narodna partija, DNP) is a Serb interests political party in Montenegro.

== History ==
The Democratic People's Party was founded in 2015 from the former Socialist People's Party (SNP) faction led by Milan Knežević and Predrag Bulatović which left the Party and joined the Democratic Front alliance as an independent group, prior the October 2012 parliamentary election. DNP currently has four MPs in the Parliament of Montenegro elected from the list of the Democratic Front alliance on 2016 election.

On 9 May 2019, paty leader Knežević, along with 13 another people found guilty by the Higher Court for the allegedly "plotting to commit terrorist acts and undermine the constitutional order of Montenegro on the day of 2016 parliamentary election." In 2021, the appellate court annulled the first instance verdict on all counts of the indictment.

== Ideology ==
The party views the Serb community, which it represents, as discriminated against. It sees Montenegro as pursuing the concept of a nation-state and the politics of assimilation. It demands that the Serbian language enters the Constitution of Montenegro as the official language. The party is currently the main advocate of Serbian-Montenegrin unionism, together with its coalition partner the New Serb Democracy.

In relation to the Russo-Ukrainian war, Knežević has stated that he supports "the territorial integrity of both Russia and Ukraine", he does not support Russian military intervention against any country, and he advocates a peace agreement between Russia and Ukraine. He has stated that while he opposes Montenegrin sanctions on Russia, he believes that anyone involved in committing crimes against civilians should be held accountable, including Putin.

The Democratic People's Party jointly with New Serb Democracy has had cooperation with the Russian far-right Rodina and United Russia parties as well with Serb nationalist Alliance of Independent Social Democrats from Bosnia and Herzegovina, and the party also maintains a very close cooperation with the right-wing populist Serbian Progressive Party regime in Serbia.

== Electoral performance ==
=== Presidential elections ===
President of Montenegro
Election year	#	Candidate	1st round vote	%	2nd round	%	Notes
2013	2nd	Miodrag Lekić	154,289	48.79%	—	—	Independent, support
2018	2nd	Mladen Bojanić	111,711	33.40%	—	—	Independent, support
2023	3rd	Andrija Mandić	65,385	19.32%	—	—	Democratic Front

=== Parliamentary elections ===
Election	Party leader	Performance				Alliance	Government
Election	Party leader	Votes	%	Seats	+/–	Alliance	Government
2012	Milan Knežević	82,773	22.82%	3 / 81	New	DF	Opposition
2016	Milan Knežević	77,784	20.32%	4 / 81	▲1	DF	Opposition
2020	Milan Knežević	133,261	32.55%	5 / 81	▲1	DF – ZBCG	Support 2020–22
2020	Milan Knežević	133,261	32.55%	5 / 81	▲1	DF – ZBCG	Opposition 2022–23
2023	Milan Knežević	44,565	14.74%	4 / 81	▼1	ZBCG	Support 2023–24
2023	Milan Knežević	44,565	14.74%	4 / 81	▼1	ZBCG	Government 2024–26
2023	Milan Knežević	44,565	14.74%	4 / 81	▼1	ZBCG	Opposition 2026–27
