= Bosniak Party =

Montenegrin political party

Bosniak Party Bošnjačka stranka Бошњачка странка
- Abbreviation: BS
- President: Ervin Ibrahimović
- Founder: Rafet Husović
- Founded: 26 February 2006; 20 years ago
- Headquarters: Rožaje, Montenegro
- Ideology: Bosniak nationalism; Social conservatism; Bosniak minority interests; Pro-Europeanism
- Political position: Centre-right
- National affiliation: European Montenegro (2009–2012)
- European affiliation: European People's Party (associate)
- Parliament: 6 / 81
- Mayors: 2 / 25
- Local Parliaments: 54 / 844

Website
- www.bscg.me

The Bosniak Party (Montenegrin/Bosnian: Bošnjačka stranka, Montenegrin Cyrillic: Бошњачка странка, abbr. BS) is a conservative and national conservative political party of the Bosniak minority in Montenegro. Its founder and first leader was Rafet Husović, while the party is currently led by Ervin Ibrahimović, MP, who is also serving as the party's parliamentary group leader in the Parliament of Montenegro.

== History ==
This party was founded in 2006 by Rafet Husović and was officially registered with the Ministry of Justice on 24 March 2006. It was formed by unification of the Slavic Muslim-oriented parties in Montenegro: International Democratic Union, Bosniak Democratic Alternative, Muslim-Bosniak Alliance, and Party of National Equality, in February of the same year. At the legislative elections in Montenegro in March 2009, the Bosniak Party was a part of victorious Coalition for a European Montenegro, alongside the DPS, SDP, and HGI. From its founding up until 2021, Bosniak Party was led by its founder Rafet Husović.

== Electoral performance ==
=== Parliamentary elections ===
Election	Party leader	Performance				Alliance	Government
Election	Party leader	Votes	%	Seats	+/–	Alliance	Government
2006	Rafet Husović	12,748	3.76%	1 / 81	New	LP–BS	Support
2009	Rafet Husović	16,290	5.9%	3 / 81	▲2	ECG	Coalition
2012	Rafet Husović	15,124	4.17%	3 / 81	0	—	Coalition
2016	Rafet Husović	12,089	3.16%	2 / 81	▼1	—	Coalition
2020	Rafet Husović	16,279	3.98%	3 / 81	▲1	—	Opposition 2020–22
2020	Rafet Husović	16,279	3.98%	3 / 81	▲1	—	Coalition 2022–23
2023	Ervin Ibrahimović	21,423	7.08%	6 / 81	▲3	—	Opposition 2023–24
2023	Ervin Ibrahimović	21,423	7.08%	6 / 81	▲3	—	Coalition 2024–

=== Local elections in 2014, 2018 and 2022 ===
Local election	Municipality					
Local election	Bar	Berane	Bijelo Polje	Plav	Pljevlja	Podgorica
2014	2 / 37 (coalition)	0 / 35	2 / 38	7 / 31	17 / 35 (European Montenegro coalition)	did not participate
2018	1 / 37	17 / 35 (DPS-BS-SD coalition)	2 / 38 (DPS-BS-SD coalition)	7 / 31	2 / 35 (DPS-BS-SD coalition)	1 / 61 (DPS-LP-BS-CNR-DUA-PCG coalition)
2022	1 / 37	1 / 35 (DPS-BS-SD coalition)	4 / 38	7 / 31	1 / 35 (DPS-BS-SD-SDP-LP coalition)	1 / 58 (DPS-SDP-SD-LP-BS-DUA-NL-DPR coalition)
