= Parliament of Montenegro =

Unicameral legislature of Montenegro

Parliament of Montenegro Skupština Crne Gore Скупштина Црне Горе Kuvendi i Malit të Zi
- 12th Parliament
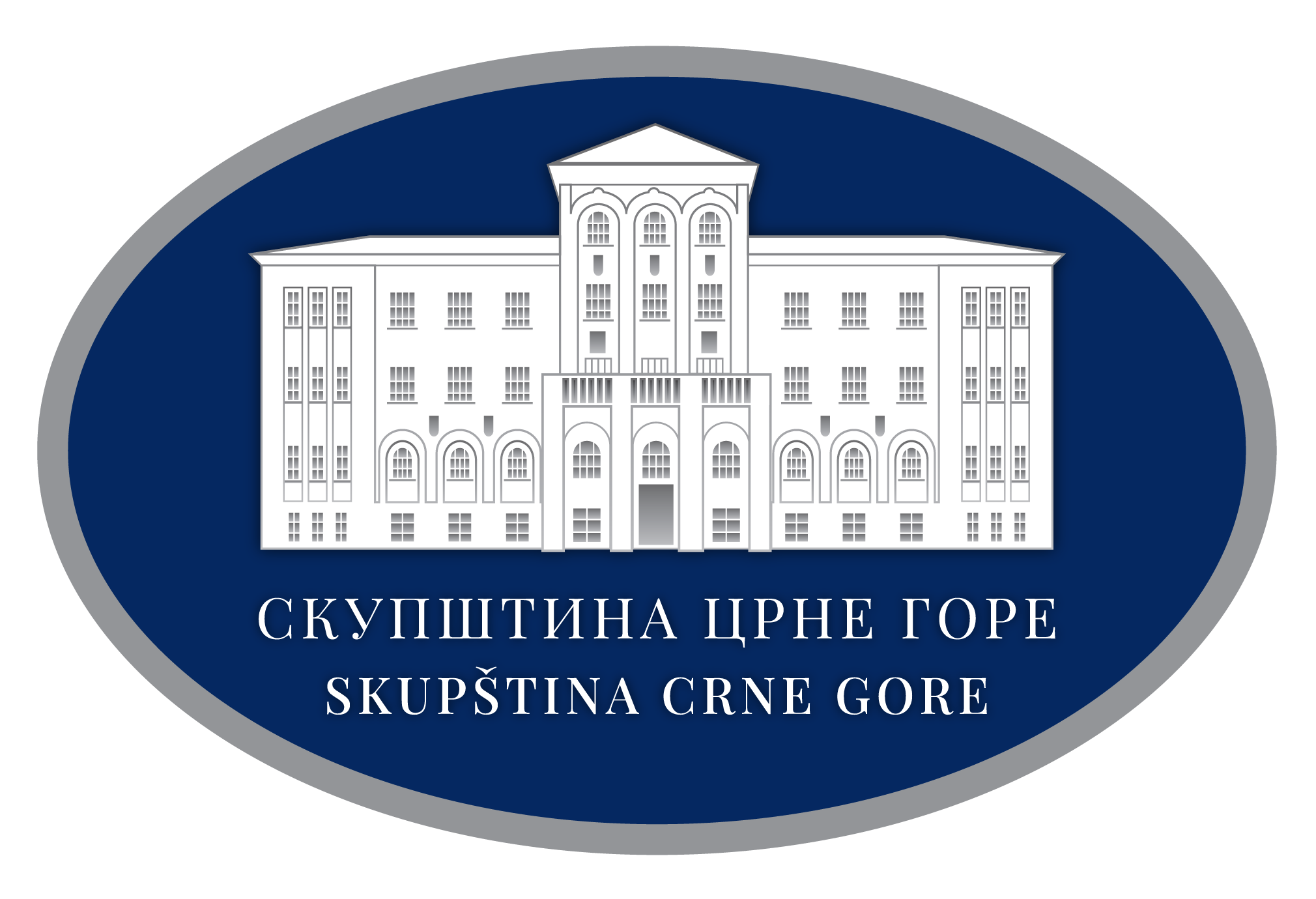

Type
- Type: Unicameral

Leadership
- President: Andrija Mandić, NSD since 30 October 2023
- First Vice President: Boris Pejović, PES since 30 October 2023
- Second Vice President: Zdenka Popović, DCG since 30 October 2023

Structure
- Seats: 81
- Political groups: Government (Spajić Cabinet) (46) PES (19) ZBCG (13): NSD (9); SNP (2); UCG (1); DCG (7) BS (6) ASh (1) Supported by (5) Independents (1) Civis (1) LDSh (1) FORCA (1) UDSh (1) Opposition (30) DPS (16) URA (4) Independents (3) DNP (3) SD (3) HGI (1)

Elections
- Voting system: Proportional representation under the D'Hondt method
- Last election: 11 June 2023
- Next election: On or before 30 June 2027

Meeting place
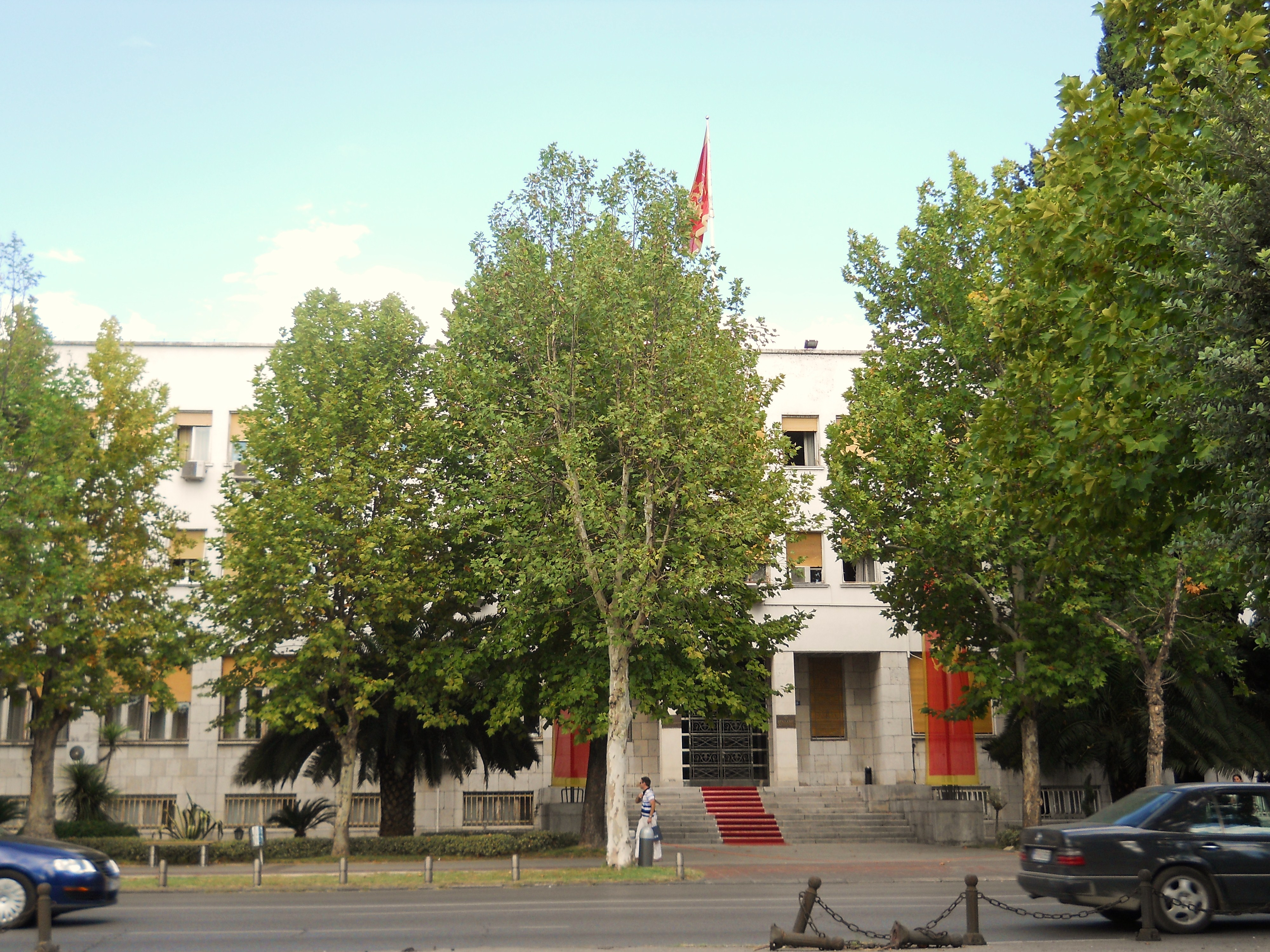
- House of the Assembly, Boulevard of Saint Peter of Cetinje, Podgorica

Website
- www.skupstina.me

The Parliament of Montenegro (Montenegrin: Skupština Crne Gore / Скупштина Црне Горе) is the unicameral legislature of Montenegro. The Parliament currently has 81 members, with each member elected to a four-year term. Following the 2006 independence referendum, the Parliament declared and ratified the independence of Montenegro on 3 June 2006. Members of the Parliament are elected using proportional representation.

== History ==
The Parliament of Montenegro was initially established by the Constitution of the Principality of Montenegro in 1905 and was called the Popular Assembly (Narodna skupština). It had a limited legislative role, limited by the authority of the Knjaz (Prince). The first parliament was constituted in 1906. Following the incorporation of the Kingdom of Montenegro into the Kingdom of Yugoslavia in 1918, the Parliament of Montenegro was disbanded until World War II. The Parliament was reinstated in 1944, in the form of the Montenegrin Anti-Fascist Assembly of National Liberation (CASNO), which changed its name to the Montenegrin National Assembly, and later the National Assembly. This lasted until 1946, when a new Assembly was elected for the Socialist Republic of Montenegro, a constituent republic within the SFR Yugoslavia. The current parliament is the 23rd since the foundation of the Parliament.

== Powers ==
The Parliament appoints the Prime Minister nominated by the President, as well as the ministers chosen by the Prime Minister. Parliament also passes all laws in Montenegro, ratifies international treaties, appoints justices of all courts, adopts the budget and performs other duties as established by the Constitution. The Parliament can pass a vote of no-confidence in the Government with a majority of the members.

== Deputies ==
A deputy has a four-year term. One deputy is elected per 6,000 voters, which in turn results in a change of total number of deputies in the parliament. Current assembly convening comprises 81 deputies.

== Elections ==
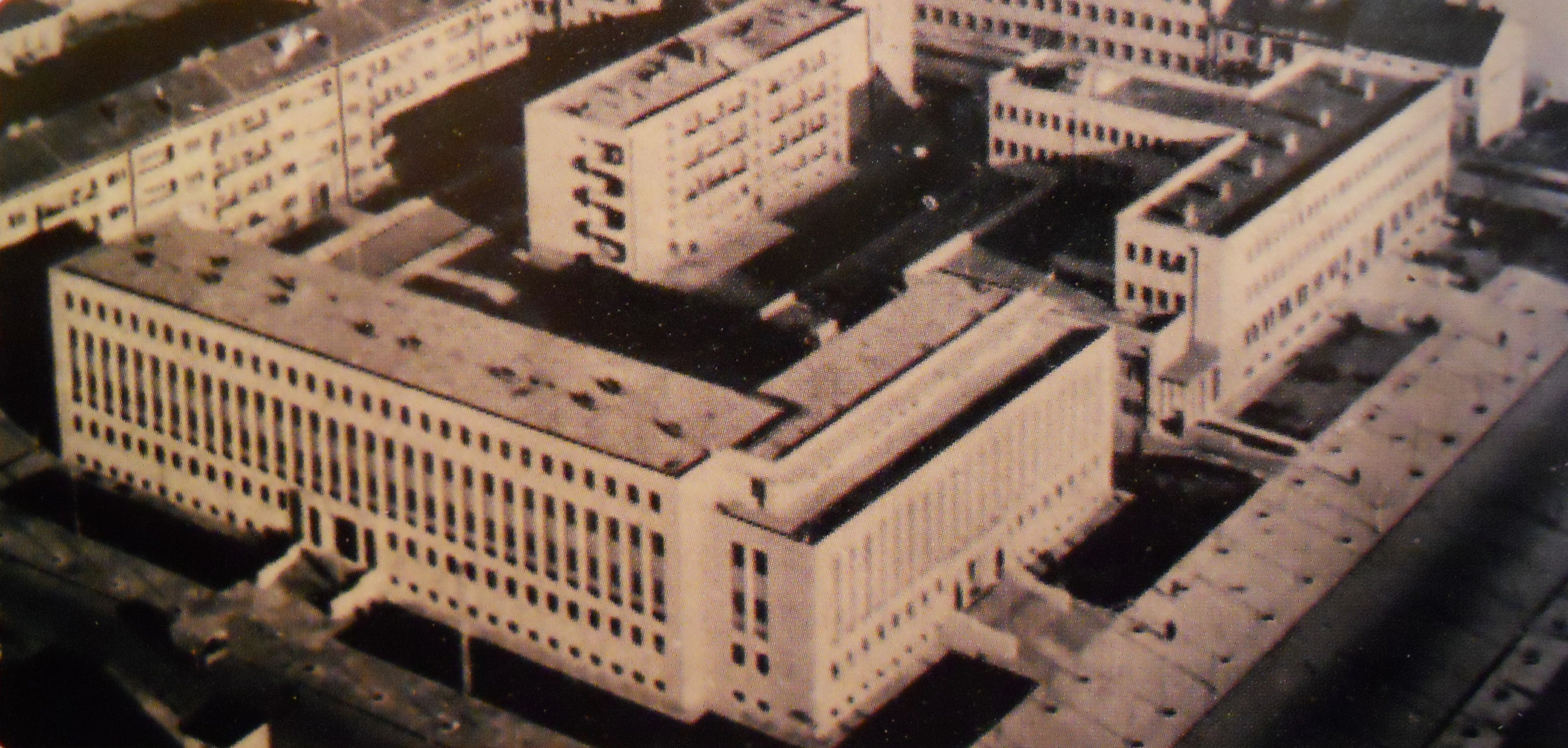
Old photograph of the Montenegrin parliament building (right) and the current Presidential residence (left)

The Parliament has 81 members (deputies) elected by a D'Hondt method system of proportional representation for a four-year term.

The 81 seats of the Parliament of Montenegro are elected in a single nationwide constituency by closed list proportional representation. Seats are allocated using the d'Hondt method with a three percent electoral threshold. Minority groups that account for up to 15 percent of the population are given an exemption that lowers the electoral threshold to 0.7 percent if their list fails to cross the three percent threshold. For ethnic Croats, if no list representing the population passes the 0.7 percent threshold, the list with the most votes will win one seat if it receives more than 0.35 percent of the vote.

=== 2023 parliamentary election ===
| Party | Votes | % | Seats | +/– |
|---|---|---|---|---|
| Europe Now! | 77,203 | 25.53 | 24 | +22 |
| Together! (DPS–SD–LP–UDSh) | 70,228 | 23.22 | 21 | −12 |
| For the Future of Montenegro (NSD–DNP–RP) | 44,565 | 14.74 | 13 | −2 |
| Aleksa and Dritan – Count Bravely! (Democrats–URA) | 37,730 | 12.48 | 11 | −1 |
| Bosniak Party | 21,423 | 7.08 | 6 | +3 |
| SNP–DEMOS | 9,472 | 3.13 | 2 | −4 |
| Social Democratic Party of Montenegro | 9,010 | 2.98 | 0 | −2 |
| Justice for All | 8,380 | 2.77 | 0 | New |
| Albanian Forum (ASh–LDSh–UNSh) | 5,767 | 1.91 | 2 | +2 |
| Turnaround for a Safe Montenegro | 4,833 | 1.60 | 0 | New |
| Albanian Alliance (FORCA–PD–LSMZ) | 4,512 | 1.49 | 1 | –1 |
| People's Coalition (DHP–PCG–SCG–DSS–PZPV) | 3,630 | 1.20 | 0 | −1 |
| Croatian Civic Initiative | 2,226 | 0.74 | 1 | +1 |
| Movement for Changes | 1,993 | 0.66 | 0 | −5 |
| Yes, We Can! | 1,444 | 0.48 | 0 | New |
| Total | 302,416 | 100.00 | 81 | 0 |
| Valid votes | 302,416 | 99.05 | | |
| Invalid/blank votes | 2,890 | 0.95 | | |
| Total votes | 305,306 | 100.00 | | |
| Registered voters/turnout | 542,468 | 56.28 | | |
Source: RTC

== Symbols ==
In 2024, Speaker Andrija Mandić introduced a new visual identity for the Parliament of Montenegro, presenting a logo depicting the Palace of Zeta Banovina, a building that had once housed key institutions in Montenegro. Mandić stated that the design was chosen to honour Cetinje as Montenegro’s historic capital. The move drew criticism from opposition parties with Democratic Party of Socialists of Montenegro MP Andrija Nikolić questioned the authority to implement the change and argued that the Zeta Banovina symbol evoked a period when Montenegro lost its name.

== See also ==
- President of the Parliament of Montenegro
- Palace of Zeta Banovina
