= 2026 in Montenegro =

- Decades: 2000s; 2010s; 2020s
- See also: Other events of 2026; Timeline of Montenegrin history

Events in the year 2026 in Montenegro.

== Incumbents ==
- President: Jakov Milatović
- Prime Minister: Milojko Spajić

== Events ==
- 26 January – A coordinated blockade is held by truck drivers in border crossings nationwide in protest over the implementation of the Entry/Exit System by the European Union.
- 3 June – Montenegro bans 87 Serbian nationals who arrived in Tivat aboard a chartered Air Serbia flight from entering the country, citing security concerns ahead of a summit between EU and Balkan leaders.

== Holidays ==
- 1 January – New Year's Day
- 6–8 January – Christmas Day
- 10 April – Orthodox Good Friday
- 13 April – Orthodox Easter Monday
- 1–2 May – Labour Day
- 21–22 May – Independence Day
- 13–14 July – National Day
- 13–14 November – Njegos Day

== Deaths ==
- 8 April – Duško Vujošević, 67, basketball coach (Partizan, Pallacanestro Brescia, Bosnia national team).
- 25 October – Darko Božović, 48, footballer (Mladenovac, Bežanija, national team).
