= 2027 in Montenegro =

- Decades: 2000s; 2010s; 2020s
- See also: Other events of 2027; Timeline of Montenegrin history

Events in the year 2027 in Montenegro.

== Events ==
=== Predicted and scheduled ===
- By 30 June – 2027 Montenegrin parliamentary election
- 2 August – Solar eclipse of August 2, 2027 (partial eclipse)

== Holidays ==
- 1 January – New Year's Day
- 6–8 January – Christmas Day
- 30 April – Orthodox Good Friday
- 1 May – Labour Day
- 3 May –
  - Orthodox Easter Monday
  - Labour Day Holiday
- 21–22 May – Independence Day
- 13–14 July – National Day
- 13–14 November – Njegos Day
