= Stadion Malih Sportova =

Sports venue in Podgorica, Montenegro

Coordinates: 42.443944°N 19.269681°E

Stadium of Little Sports (Montenegrin and Serbian: Stadion malih sportova Стадион малих спортова) is a multi-purpose stadium in Podgorica, the capital of Montenegro. It is located under the Gorica hill, near the city center. The stadium's total area is 6.686 square meters, and it is owned by the municipality of Podgorica. Stadion malih sportova serves as one of the main concert venues in the city.

== Held and scheduled events ==
Date	Event	Attendance	Type	Note
October, 1999	Van Gogh	n/a	Concert	
August, 2003	Van Gogh	n/a	Concert	
June 10, 2009	Operacija Trijumf contestants	6.000	Concert	
June 13, 2009	Dino Merlin	12.000	Concert	part of his Ispočetka tour
July 13, 2010	Van Gogh		Concert	Montenegrin Statehood day commemoration concert
September 3, 2011	Sergej Ćetković	5.000	Concert	
September 9, 2011	Gibonni	10.000	Concert	part of his Toleranca tour
September 16, 2011	Dženan Lončarević	10.000	Concert	his first solo concert
March 26, 2012	Colonia		Concert	
May 21, 2012	Neverne Bebe		Concert	Montenegrin Independence Day commemoration concert
June 8, 2012	Eyesburn		Concert	Part of Telekom Underhill Fest 2012
June 15, 2012	Darkwood Dub		Concert	Part of Telekom Underhill Fest 2012
September 15, 2012	Đorđe Balašević	6.000	Concert + Kao Rani Mraz film premiere	
September 28, 2012	Haris Džinović		Concert	
November 10, 2012	Dženan Lončarević and Goca Tržan		Concert	
June 14, 2013	Tropico Band		Concert + theatrical show Maćado	
August 31, 2013	Sergej Ćetković with special guests: Sal da Vinci and Maya Sar		Concert	Part of his Live Montenegro 2013 tour
September 12, 2013	Disclosure, Mount Kimbie, Retro Stefson & DJ Gilerz		Concert	Part of T-Mobile's Electronic Beats Festival Podgorica
