= 2020 in Montenegro =

- Decades: 2000s; 2010s; 2020s
- See also: Other events of 2020; Timeline of Montenegrin history

Events of 2020 in Montenegro.

== Incumbents ==
- President: Milo Đukanović
- Prime Minister: Duško Marković (until 4 December), Zdravko Krivokapić (starting 4 December)

== Ongoing ==
- COVID-19 pandemic in Montenegro

== Events ==
- January 2 – Several thousand fans of the Red Star Belgrade marched to the Montenegrin embassy in Belgrade to support the protests in Montenegro against the law, setting off fireworks that partially burned the flag of Montenegro outside the embassy building. Several Serbian far-right organisations also joined the rally. Although the event was announced, the embassy was allegedly left unguarded by the Serbian police, with only undercover security units present, which sparked criticism from Montenegro. President of Serbia Aleksandar Vučić denied these claims and stated that the embassy was well-guarded and Serbian Ministry of Foreign Affairs condemned the vandalism and stated that the Montenegrin government is trying to shift the blame for ongoing crisis on Serbia.
- February 29 – A senior Russian-backed bishop in Ukraine Onufriy Berezovsky participated and led a prayer walk and protest rally in Podgorica, reflecting tense relations between the Montenegrin government and Russia.
- 30 August – 2020 Montenegrin parliamentary election.
