= 2021 in Montenegro =

- Decades: 2000s; 2010s; 2020s
- See also: Other events of 2021; Timeline of Montenegrin history

Events in the year 2021 in Montenegro.

== Incumbents ==
- President: Milo Đukanović
- Prime Minister: Zdravko Krivokapić

== Events ==
Ongoing — COVID-19 pandemic in Montenegro

- 14 March – 2021 Montenegrin municipal elections.
- 5 September - Clashes in the city of Cetinje following inauguration of Serb Orthodox Church leader Joanikije II.

== Deaths ==
=== January ===
- 24 January – Jevrem Brković, writer, poet, and historian (born 1933).

=== March ===
- 9 March – Rafet Husović, politician (born 1964).
- 12 March – Miodrag Baletić, basketball coach (born 1948).
