= 2019 in Montenegro =

- Decades: 1990s; 2000s; 2010s; 2020s
- See also: Other events of 2019; Timeline of Montenegrin history

This article lists events from the year 2019 in Montenegro.

== Incumbents ==
- President: Milo Đukanović
- Prime Minister: Duško Marković

== Events ==
- 2 February to 30 September – 2019 Montenegrin anti-corruption protests
- 24 December 2019 to 30 August 2020 – 2019–2020 Clerical protests in Montenegro

== Deaths ==
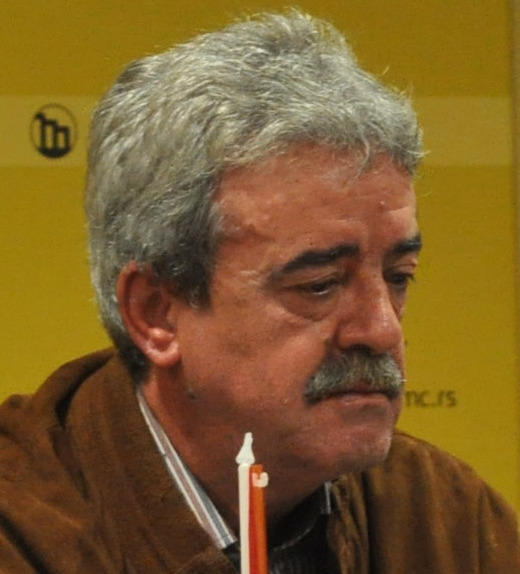
Momir Bulatović

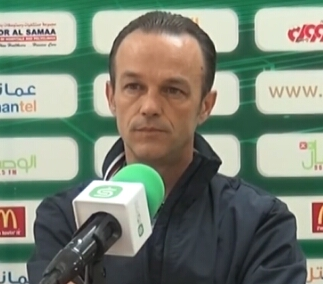
Milovan Minja Prelević

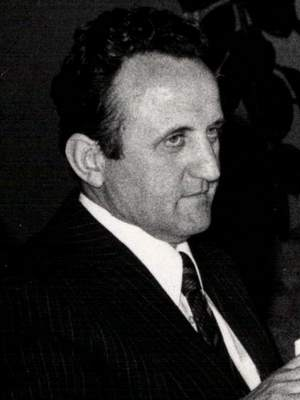
Marko Orlandić

- 3 March – Uroš Tošković, painter (b. 1932).
- 30 June – Momir Bulatović, politician, President of the Republic of Montenegro and Prime Minister of the Federal Republic of Yugoslavia (b. 1956).
- 1 August – Milovan Minja Prelević, footballer (b. 1970).
- 19 September – Koča Pavlović, journalist and politician (b. 1962).
- 13 October – Goran Marković, footballer (b. 1986).
- 25 October – Janko Vučinić, boxer and politician (b. 1966).
- 20 December – Marko Orlandić, politician, Prime Minister and President (b. 1930).

== Links ==
Media related to 2019 in Montenegro at Wikimedia Commons
