= 2022 in Montenegro =

- Decades: 2000s; 2010s; 2020s
- See also: Other events of 2022; Timeline of Montenegrin history

Events in the year 2022 in Montenegro.

== Incumbents ==
- President: Milo Đukanović
- Prime Minister: Zdravko Krivokapić (until 28 April), Dritan Abazović (starting 28 April)

== Events ==
Ongoing — COVID-19 pandemic in Montenegro; Montenegrin nationalist protests (2020–present)

- 4 February – The Government of Zdravko Krivokapić is ousted after a motion of no confidence passes 43–11.
- 28 April – Dritan Abazović is elected by the Parliament of Montenegro as the new Prime Minister, succeeding Zdravko Krivokapić, who was ousted by a motion of censure on 4 February.
- 12 August – 2022 Cetinje shooting - A man kills a woman and two children at their home in Cetinje, before opening fire in the streets against random civilians, killing seven people and wounding six others. The perpetrator is later killed by an armed citizen.
- 12 December – Protests and riots break out in front of the Parliament building of Montenegro after the adoption of amendments to the presidential bill.

== Building Projects ==
- Smokovac - Mateševo section of the Princess Xenia motorway completed.

== Deaths ==
=== January ===
- 25 January - Dojčin Perazić, footballer (b. 1945)

=== April ===
- 4 April - Branislav Šoškić, politician (b. 1922)
