= 2012 in Montenegro =

- Decades: 1990s; 2000s; 2010s; 2020s
- See also: Other events of 2012; Timeline of Montenegrin history

Events in the year 2012 in Montenegro.

== Incumbents ==
- President: Filip Vujanović
- Prime Minister: Igor Lukšić

== Events ==
- Parliamentary elections were held on 14 October 2012. The long-ruling Democratic Party of Socialists (DPS), led by Milo Đukanović, remained the dominant political force.
- Montenegro had opened negotiations with the European Union in June 2012, and throughout the year worked on judicial reform and governance standards.
