= 2018 in Montenegro =

- Decades: 1990s; 2000s; 2010s; 2020s
- See also: Other events of 2018; Timeline of Montenegrin history

This article lists events from the year 2018 in Montenegro.

== Incumbents ==
- President: Filip Vujanović (until 20 May); Milo Đukanović (from 20 May)
- Prime Minister: Duško Marković

== Events ==
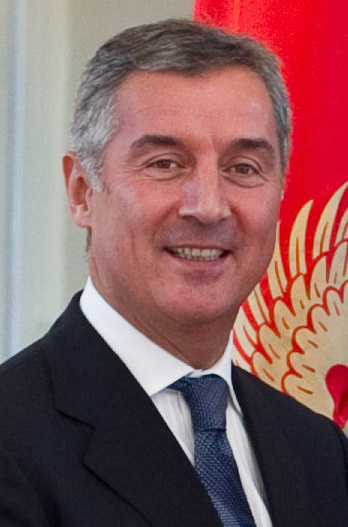
Milo Đukanović wins the Montenegrin presidential election, 2018

- 9 to 25 February – Montenegro participated at the 2018 Winter Olympics in PyeongChang, South Korea, with three competitors in two sports.
- 15 April – Milo Đukanović wins the presidential election with a majority of the votes.

== Deaths ==
- 12 December – Pavle Strugar, military officer and convicted war criminal (b. 1933).

== Links ==
Media related to 2018 in Montenegro at Wikimedia Commons
