= 2011 in Montenegro =

- Decades: 1990s; 2000s; 2010s; 2020s
- See also: Other events of 2011; Timeline of Montenegrin history

Events in the year 2011 in Montenegro.

== Incumbents ==
- President: Filip Vujanović
- Prime Minister: Igor Lukšić

== Events ==
- 15 October - the Dajbabska Gora Tower officially opens

== Sports ==
Football (soccer) competitions: Montenegrin First League, Montenegrin Cup.

- The Montenegrin Women's League is founded
