= 2016 in Montenegro =

- Decades: 1990s; 2000s; 2010s; 2020s
- See also: Other events of 2016; Timeline of Montenegrin history

This article lists events from the year 2016 in Montenegro.

== Incumbents ==
- President: Filip Vujanović
- Prime Minister: Milo Đukanović (until 28 November); Duško Marković

== Events ==
- Ongoing – the 2015–16 political crisis
- 5-21 August – Montenegro at the 2016 Summer Olympics: 34 competitors in 7 sports. The Montenegrin water polo team reached the semifinals and ended in 4th place.
- 16 October – Montenegrin parliamentary election, 2016
- 28 November – Duško Marković took over as prime minister

== Deaths ==
- 3 June – Sreten Asanović, writer (b. 1931).
- 8 September – Dragiša Pešić, politician (b. 1954).

== Links ==
Media related to 2016 in Montenegro at Wikimedia Commons
