= 2023 in Montenegro =

- Decades: 2000s; 2010s; 2020s
- See also: Other events of 2023; Timeline of Montenegrin history

Events in the year 2023 in Montenegro.

== Incumbents ==
- President: Milo Đukanović (until 20 May), Jakov Milatović (starting 20 May)
- Prime Minister: Dritan Abazović

== Events ==
Ongoing — COVID-19 pandemic in Montenegro

- 27 February – Parliament elects three of four Constitutional Court judges, ending a stalemate that threatened Montenegro’s EU bid.
- 19 March – 2023 Montenegrin presidential election: Incumbent president Milo Đukanović wins the first round, moving onto face Jakov Milatović in the runoff on 2 April.
- 2 April – Former economic minister Jakov Milatović defeats incumbent Milo Đukanović to become the new President of Montenegro, with 60.1% of the vote.
- 11 June – The pro-EU Europe Now Movement wins a snap parliamentary election with 25.6%, ahead of the DPS (23.7%); turnout is 56.4%, and leader Milojko Spajić begins coalition talks.
- 10 August – President Jakov Milatović nominates Milojko Spajić as prime minister-designate after 44 lawmakers pledge support for him.
- 12 September – Police launch an investigation after discovering a tunnel from an apartment to a Podgorica court depot holding seized drugs and evidence.
- 19 September – A bus carrying 30 passengers plunges into a ravine on the road between Budva and Cetinje, killing two people and seriously injuring nine others.
- 31 October – Montenegro's parliament appoints a new pro-European and pro-Serb government led by Milojko Spajic, including 19 ministries and five deputy prime ministers.
- 30 November – Montenegro postpones its population census to 3 December after the opposition threats to boycott the headcount.

== Sports ==
- 23 July 2022 – May 2023: 2022–23 Montenegrin First League
- 2022–23 Montenegrin Cup
- UEFA Euro 2024 qualifying Group G
- 2022–23 BIBL season
