= Independence Day (Montenegro) =

Montenegrin holiday observed on 21 May

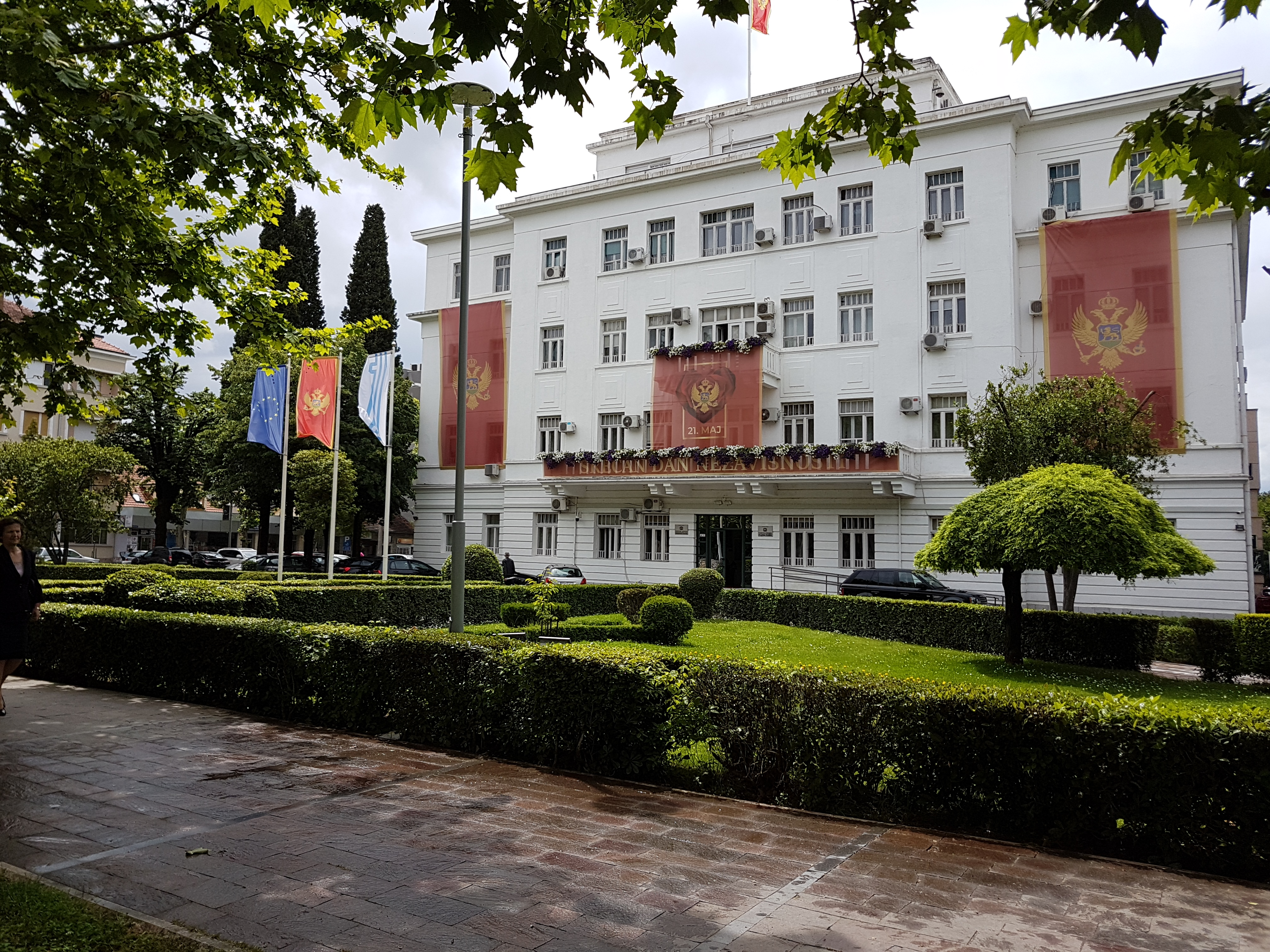
Podgorica City Hall draped with the Flag of Montenegro for Independence Day celebrations in 2019

Independence Day (Montenegrin: Dan nezavisnosti / Дан независности) is observed in Montenegro on 21 May to commemorate the passage of the 2006 Montenegrin independence referendum, marking Montenegro's independence from Serbia and Montenegro.

== Background ==
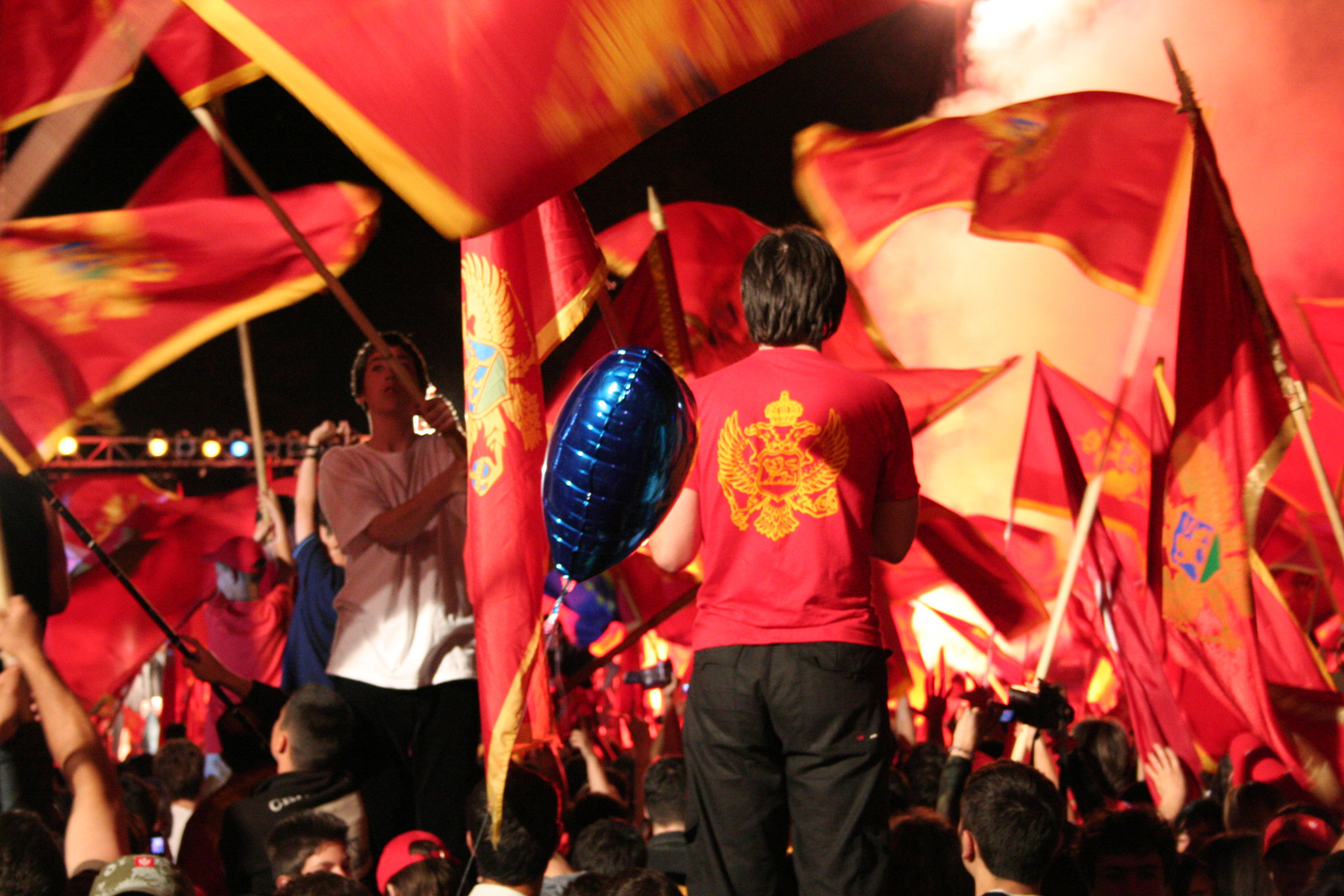
Supporters of independence in Cetinje following the passage of the referendum in 2006

Montenegro became first independent in 1878 after the Treaty of Berlin was signed. It became part of the Kingdom of Serbs, Croats and Slovènes in 1918, which was renamed to the Kingdom of Yugoslavia in 1929; but was dismembered in 1941 by the Axis Powers who invaded the country and its territory was occupied by Fascist Italy and Nazi Germany. In 1945, Montenegro regained its statehood by ZAVNOCGB and became part of the second Yugoslavia. When Yugoslavia was about to break up, the Republic of Montenegro formed a union with Serbia in 1992 as part of the Federal Republic of Yugoslavia, which was renamed to the State Union of Serbia and Montenegro in 2003.

Three years later citizens of the Republic of Montenegro voted in an independence referendum on 21 May 2006. All members of the Montenegrin diaspora, with the exception of Montenegrins living in Serbia, were able to vote. Voters were asked "Do you want the Republic of Montenegro to be an international state with full international and legal subjectivity?" (Note: Montenegrin: "Želite li da Republika Crna Gora bude nezavisna država s punim međunarodno-pravnim subjektivitetom?" / "Желите ли да Република Црна Гора буде независна држава с пуним међународно-правним субјективитетом?") The movement for independence was largely supported by ethnic Montenegrins and the government of Montenegro, especially Prime Minister Milo Đukanović. Opposed to the movement were mostly ethnic Serbs, including the Republic of Serbia and the Montenegrin Orthodox Church. Pro-union supporters accused Đukanović of wanting his own "private state."

Voter turnout for the referendum was 86.49%, with 55.5% of voters in favor of the referendum, just above the 55% threshold proposed by the European Union for international recognition. On 3 June, the Parliament of Montenegro formally declared independence from its union with Serbia.

== Observance ==
Both local and state authorities organize celebrations across the country, with local artists holding concerts. Media representatives, government officials, and foreign diplomats are often in attendance for Independence Day celebrations. The prime minister of Montenegro often holds a reception for the holiday and gives an address to the nation. The final of the Montenegrin Men's Handball Cup is held on Independence Day.

In 2024, the New York City Council hosted a Montenegrin Independence Day event at New York City Hall.

== See also ==
- Statehood Day (Montenegro)
