= Uroš Tošković =

Montenegrin and Yugoslav painter and draftsman (1932–2019)

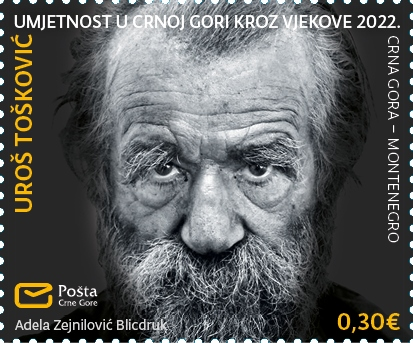
Tošković on a 2022 stamp of Montenegro

Uroš Tošković (Serbian Cyrillic: Урош Тошковић; 19 November 1932 – 3 March 2019) was a Montenegrin painter and draftsman.

== Early life ==
Tošković was born in a poor family in the village of Pelev Brijeg, in Bratonožići region of Montenegro, which was then a part of the Kingdom of Yugoslavia. His childhood was marked by poverty, experiences of an abusive father, and the atrocities of World War II. His three brothers died fighting for the Yugoslav Partisans.

After moving to Cetinje, Tošković enrolled in Art School, which was later transferred to Herceg Novi, where he graduated in 1952, in the class led by Petar Lubarda and Milo Milunović. Later he moved to Belgrade, where he graduated from the Academy of Fine Arts in 1956, in the class mentored by Marko Čelebonović. During the studies in Belgrade, Tošković partnered with Dado Đurić, Olja Ivanjicki and others, forming the alternative artist group Mediala in 1953.

== Career ==
In 1956, Tošković moved to Paris, upon receiving a French government scholarship for the École des Beaux-Arts, where he graduated under the mentorship of Maurice Brianchon. He lived and worked in Paris until 1976, leading an ascetic and bohemian lifestyle, occasionally living as a vagabond. He was a close friend of Dado, fellow Montenegrin painter who gained international recognition. Tošković claimed that he idolised Pablo Picasso and wanted to be mentored by the Spaniard, but was disenchanted upon meeting him and dropped the idea.

In 1976, he moved from Paris to Belgrade, and since 1996 he resided in the Montenegrin coastal town of Bar. He gained recognition in his homeland, and in 1987 he received the 13th July Award, highest civil award issued by the Government of Montenegro.

== Death ==
Tošković died on 3 March 2019 at the age of 86.
