= Dajbabska Gora Tower =

Agency for Electronic Communications and Postal Services Main Control and Measuring Center
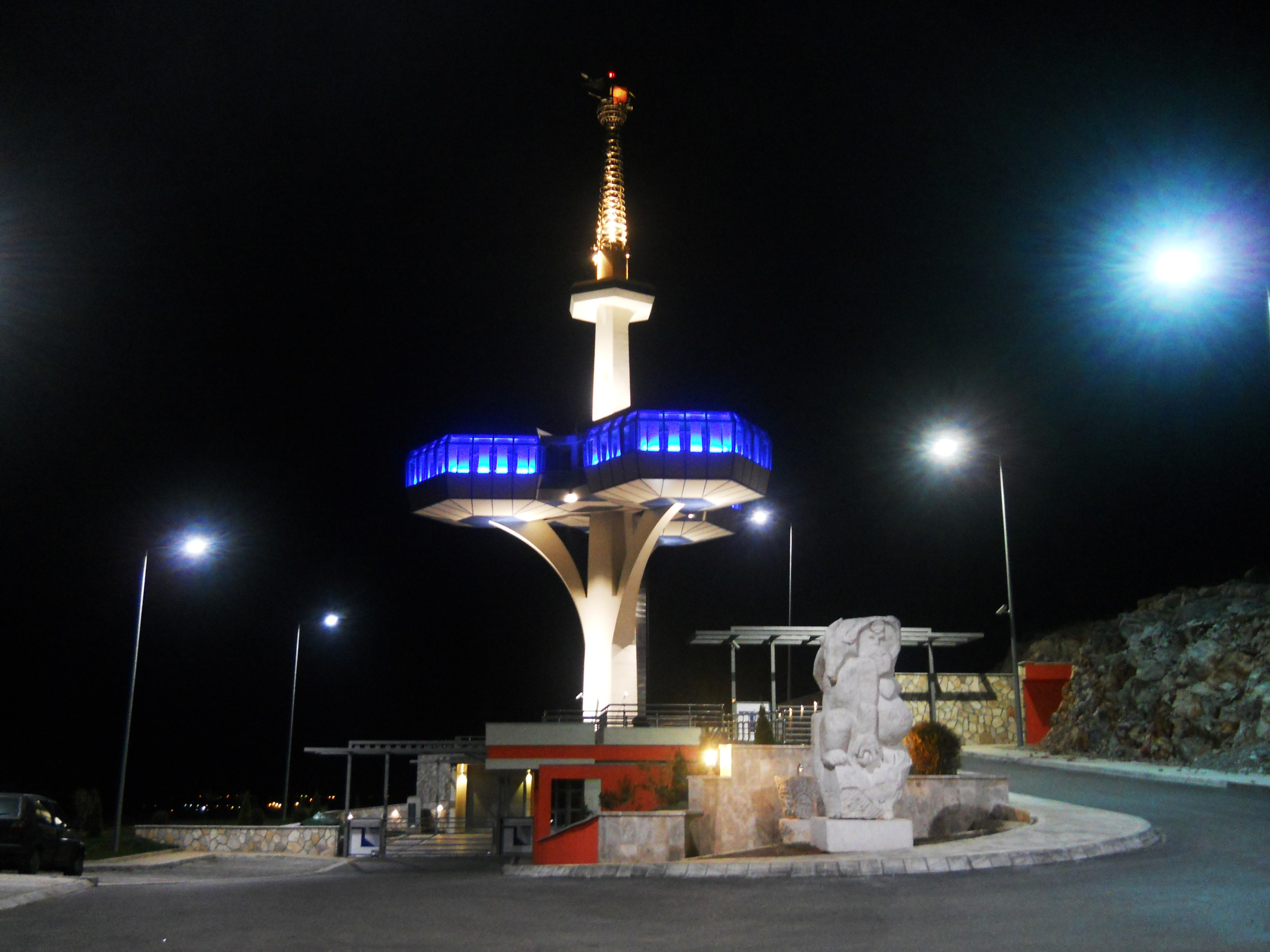
- The tower at night
- Interactive map of the Agency for Electronic Communications and Postal Services Main Control and Measuring Center area

General information
- Status: radio frequency spectrum control tower
- Location: Podgorica, Montenegro
- Coordinates: 42.41716°N 19.238636°E
- Construction started: 2008
- Completed: 15 October 2011
- Cost: 6.000.000€

Height
- Height: 55 m (180 ft)

Design and construction
- Main contractor: Zoran Sekulić

The Dajbabska Gora Tower (Montenegrin: Торањ на Дајбабској Гори, romanized: Toranj na Dajbabskoj Gori) is a radio frequency spectrum control tower located on Dajbabska Gora, a hill in the south of Podgorica, Montenegro. It is 55 meters tall, and soon after its opening it became one of the most popular landmarks and visitor attractions of the city.

== Construction ==
The tower was built by the Agency for Electronic Communications and Postal Services of Montenegro during a 3-year period, from 2008 to 2011. The whole project was marred by controversy, mostly regarding the construction costs of approximately 5 million euros. It was officially opened on 15 October 2011.
