= 2024 in Montenegro =

- Decades: 2000s; 2010s; 2020s
- See also: Other events of 2024; Timeline of Montenegrin history

Events in the year 2024 in Montenegro.

== Incumbents ==
- President: Jakov Milatović
- Prime Minister: Milojko Spajić

== Events ==
- 5 March – An appeals court overturns a decision to extradite South Korean cryptocurrency mogul Do Kwon, who was arrested in Montenegro in March 2023, to the United States on fraud charges.
- 20 June – Two people are killed and three others are injured in a suspected bomb attack in the sports hall of Cetinje.
- 21 June – A massive power outage leaves much of the country without electricity.
- 2 July – Two deaths are reported in Čanj and Lustica respectively following a storm.
- 25 July – President of the Parliament Andrija Mandić, deputy prime minister Aleksa Bečić and MP Milan Knežević are declared persona non grata by Croatia following the passage of a resolution in the Parliament of Montenegro recognising a genocide in the Jasenovac concentration camp committed by the pro-Axis Independent State of Croatia during World War II.
- 1 August – An appeals court allows the extradition of Do Kwon to South Korea.
- 31 December – Do Kwon is extradited to the United States after the Ministry of Justice and Human and Minority Rights accepts a request from Washington.

=== Sports ===
- UEFA Euro 2024 qualifying Group G

== Holidays ==
- 1 January – New Year's Day
- 6–8 January – Christmas Days
- 1 May – Labour Day
- 3 May – Orthodox Good Friday
- 6 May – Orthodox Easter
- 21 May – Independence Day
- 13 July – National Day
- 13 November – Njegos Day
