= 2025 in Montenegro =

- Decades: 2000s; 2010s; 2020s
- See also: Other events of 2025; Timeline of Montenegrin history

Events in the year 2025 in Montenegro.

== Incumbents ==
- President: Jakov Milatović
- Prime Minister: Milojko Spajić

== Events ==
- 1 January - Thirteen people are killed and three others are injured in a shooting in Cetinje. The perpetrator commits suicide.
- 12 August – A water tanker overturns near Podgorica, killing a soldier responding to a wildfire.
- 21 December – Two chairlifts collide at Savin Kuk in Žabljak, killing German footballer Sebastian Hertner and injuring his wife.

== Holidays ==
- 1 January – New Year's Day
- 6–8 January – Christmas Days
- 18 April – Orthodox Good Friday
- 21 April – Orthodox Easter Monday
- 1 May – Labour Day
- 6 May – Orthodox Easter
- 21–22 May – Independence Day
- 13–15 July – National Day
- 13–14 November – Njegos Day
