= COVID-19 pandemic in Montenegro =

Information on the COVID pandemic in Montenegro

- Disease: COVID-19
- Pathogen: SARS-CoV-2
- Location: Montenegro
- Index case: Podgorica
- Arrival date: 17 March 2020 (6 years, 5 months and 6 days ago)
- Confirmed cases: 291'970
- Active cases: 480
- Hospitalized cases: 181 (-7)
- Recovered: 288'662
- Deaths: 2'828
- Fatality rate: 1.51%
- Vaccinations: 604,616 (+3,542)

Government website
- www.covidodgovor.me www.ijzcg.me

The COVID-19 pandemic in Montenegro has resulted in 251,280 confirmed cases of COVID-19 and 2,654 deaths.

The first case of the disease in Montenegro was confirmed on 17 March 2020, making it the last European country to register a case of SARS-CoV-2. On 24 May 2020, 68 days after the first case was recorded in Montenegro, it became the first COVID-19-free country in Europe. Within the first outbreak, indexed cases counted 9% of the total reported, 80% of cases were infected due to contact with primary cases, while the origin of infection of the other 11% of cases was not certain. The Government of Montenegro estimated that the country needs EUR 59.2 million private and international relief to address the health, social and economical impact of COVID-19.

Montenegro had no active cases from 24 May until 14 June 2020, when the first imported case was reported.

As of 3 December 2022, 523,735 COVID-19 vaccine doses have been administered in Montenegro.

== Background ==
On 12 January 2020, the World Health Organization (WHO) confirmed that a novel coronavirus was the cause of a respiratory illness in a cluster of people in Wuhan City, Hubei Province, China, which was reported to the WHO on 31 December 2019.

The case fatality ratio for COVID-19 had been much lower than SARS of 2003, but the transmission had been significantly greater, with a significant total death toll.

== Timeline ==
- On 31 March 2020, the number of cases surpassed 100.
- On 29 June 2020, it surpassed 500.
- On 9 July 2020, it surpassed 1,000.
- On 2 September 2020, it surpassed 5,000.
- On 26 September 2020, it surpassed 10,000.
- On 12 November 2020, it surpassed 25,000.
- On 5 January 2021, it surpassed 50,000.
- On 27 February 2021, it surpassed 75,000.
- On 16 June 2021, it surpassed 100,000.
- On 17 September 2021, it surpassed 125,000.
- On 10 November 2021, it surpassed 150,000.

On 31 August 2020, the number of deaths reached 100, surpassing it the next day. On 21 October 2020, it reached 250, surpassing it the next day. On 1 December 2021, it surpassed 500. On 20 January 2021, it surpassed 750. On 28 February 2021, it surpassed 1,000. On 29 March 2021, it surpassed 1,250. On 1 May 2021, it surpassed 1,500. On 12 October 2021, it reached 2,000, surpassing it the next day.

=== March 2020 ===
On 17 March, Montenegro confirmed its first three cases of COVID-19, a woman born in 1973, and a man born in 1963 of which two lived together in the capital city Podgorica, the other woman, born in 1948, was from Ulcinj. One of the first three cases had arrived 12 days earlier from the New York City United States to Ulcinj, the other two cases had arrived in Podgorica 5 days earlier from Barcelona Spain and were under medical surveillance.

On 18 March, 6 more cases were confirmed, one of whom had no links to the cases confirmed on the day before.

On 19 March, 2 more cases were confirmed, bringing the number of infected in the country to 10. Later that day, 3 more cases were confirmed, bringing the total to 13.

On 20 March, the 14th case was identified in Herceg Novi.

On 21 March, 2 new cases were confirmed.

On 22 March, 6 new cases were confirmed. One of these cases, a 65-year-old man who had traveled several days before from Serbia, died one day after hospital admission, becoming the country's first fatal case.

On 23 March, 5 new cases were confirmed.

On 24 March, 18 new cases were confirmed. As 15 of the new cases were recorded in Tuzi, the government imposed a complete lockdown on Tuzi, making Tuzi the first municipality in Montenegro to be put into complete lockdown during the pandemic with only essential services being allowed to operate.

On 25 March, 6 new cases were confirmed.

On 26 March, 14 new cases were confirmed. Later that day, two more cases were confirmed, while 6,258 people where under medical supervision.

On 27 March (07:45), one more case was confirmed. Later that day (17:45), five more cases were confirmed, all of them in Andrijevica, while 6,278 people where under medical supervision. Later that day (21:00), 7 more cases were confirmed, 4 in Tuzi and 3 in Bar.

On 28 March, 2 new cases were confirmed, one in Tivat and one in Podgorica.

On 29 March, one new case was confirmed.

On 30 March, 6 new cases were confirmed.

On 31 March, 18 new cases were confirmed.

=== April 2020 ===
On 1 April, 14 new cases were confirmed.

=== May 2020 ===
On 24 May, 68 days after the first case was recorded, Montenegro became the first COVID-19-free country in Europe.

=== June 2020 ===
On 14 June, the first new case in the country was reported since 4 May. However, this is also the first reported imported case, as a person from Bosnia and Herzegovina, who was put in self-isolation, was tested positive.

On 15 June, another imported case was reported in the country - this one also from Bosnia and Herzegovina and is currently located in Budva. As of 15 June, there are two active cases in Montenegro.

=== Autumn 2020 ===
On 7 October 2020, the nation's most prominent cleric Amfilohije Radović, the Serbian Orthodox metropolitan bishop of Montenegro and the Littoral, tested positive for COVID-19. He died on 30 October 2020 in Podgorica at the age of 82. Despite the Montenegrin government's bans on mass public gatherings due to the spread of COVID-19 virus, in front of the Podgorica Cathedral, there were thousands of believers present, as well as heads of the Orthodox Church in Serbia, Bosnia and Herzegovina, Greece, Ukraine and Albania, Roman Catholic Archdiocese of Bar and Islamic communities in Montenegro and Serbia, the funeral was also attended by a large number of political leaders from Montenegro and neighboring countries. Speeches at the funeral were given by Bishop Joanikije of Budimlja and Nikšić, Serbian Patriarch Irinej, Montenegrin Prime Minister-designate Zdravko Krivokapić, President of the Parliament of Montenegro Aleksa Bečić, as well as Serbian poet and the Amfilohije's close friend Matija Bećković. The funeral was a superspreader event and several church officials including Patriarch Irinej tested positive in early November. Following the Podgorica outbreak, Serbian Orthodox priests began appealing to their parishioners to take the virus more seriously.

== Statistics ==
=== Infected per municipality ===
COVID-19 free municipalities

Municipality	Total cases		Deaths		Recoveries		Active cases		Active per 100K	Percent	Fatality rate
Podgorica	58,128	+49	586	=	56,845	+54	697	-5	345.68	28.83%	1.01%
Nikšić	21,371	+25	341	=	20,834	+19	196	+6	283.22	30.88%	1.6%
Bar	9,295	+9	219	+1	8,974	+10	102	-2	242.58	22.11%	2.36%
Budva	8,854	+14	79	=	8,672	+10	103	+4	466.89	40.13%	0.89%
Bijelo Polje	7,727	+10	191	=	7,449	+9	87	+1	206.21	18.31%	2.47%
Pljevlja	6,681	+6	123	=	6,487	+5	71	+1	262.9	24.74%	1.84%
Berane	6,598	+7	127	=	6,388	+9	83	-2	260.4	20.7%	1.92%
Herceg Novi	6,197	+21	71	=	5,982	+21	144	=	470.63	20.25%	1.15%
Ulcinj	5,405	+4	123	=	5,259	=	23	+4	113.91	26.77%	2.28%
Kotor	5,024	+20	70	=	4,849	+19	105	+1	461.48	22.08%	1.39%
Cetinje	4,499	+8	88	=	4,370	+7	41	+1	270.07	29.64%	1.96%
Tivat	4,320	+12	33	+1	4,151	+19	136	-8	902.52	28.67%	0.76%
Danilovgrad	3,654	+9	31	=	3,543	+11	80	-2	437.54	19.98%	0.85%
Rožaje	3,574	+1	81	=	3,487	=	6	+1	26.06	15.52%	2.27%
Tuzi	1,670	=	21	=	1,635	=	14	=	115.74	13.81%	1.26%
Mojkovac	1,266	+4	27	=	1,200	+5	39	-1	516.35	16.76%	2.13%
Kolašin	1,189	+2	16	=	1,152	+1	21	+1	290.54	16.45%	1.35%
Andrijevica	1,147	+1	29	=	1,090	+1	28	=	610.69	25.02%	2.53%
Plav	711	=	35	=	672	=	4	=	44.05	7.83%	4.92%
Žabljak	572	=	13	=	547	+1	12	-1	389.48	18.57%	2.27%
Plužine	540	=	11	=	528	=	1	=	38.27	20.67%	2.04%
Petnjica	414	=	11	=	398	=	5	=	91.21	7.55%	2.66%
Šavnik	255	=	6	=	242	=	7	=	449.29	16.37%	2.35%
Gusinje	167	=	8	=	159	=	0	=	0	4.15%	4.79%
Total	159,635	+202	2,349	+2	155,281	+201	2,005	-1	322.41	25.67%	1.47%
As of 11 December 2021, 3:00 PM (CET)

=== Other data ===
Testing
Samples processed	919,239 (+1,972)
Positive samples (total)	17.37%
New samples positivity	10.24%
Vaccination
Vaccinated with 1. dose	279,793 (+544)
Vaccinated with 2. dose	263,776 (+1,028)
Vaccinated with 3. dose	61,047 (+1,970)
Vaccines used	604,616 (+3,542)
Vaccinated with 1. dose (%)	44.99%
Vaccinated with 2. dose (%)	42.42%
Vaccinated with 3. dose (%)	9.82%
Age
0–9	5,410
10–19	14,453
20–29	22,383
30–39	29,547
40–49	26,231
50–59	22,523
60–69	19,413
70–79	10,277
80–89	4,397
>90	431
Gender
Male	76,553
Female	82,565
As of 11 December 2021, 3:00 PM (CET)

== Government Measures ==
Country-Specific Information:

The Government of Montenegro announced an initial round of precautionary measures on 13 March designed to reduce the risk of transmission of COVID-19. Subsequent measures have also been introduced. People found to be in violation of the regulations can be fined and/or arrested, and sentenced to up to a year in prison. Some of the measures include:

- Masks are required to be worn in all enclosed public spaces (e.g. shops, banks, etc.)
- Extension of the validity of expired permanent and temporary residence permits and tourist visas until 1 July.
- Clothing stores, book stores, hair salons, fitness centers, shops, craft workshops, dental offices, driving schools, rent-a-car agencies, museums, and galleries, are reopened with obligatory social distancing and mask measures.
- Beaches are open. An area of 16 m^{2} will be delineated for each set of two deck chairs and one sunshade. The same rule applies to those who wish to use their own beach towels to lay on the beach. Deck chairs and other equipment will be disinfected on a daily basis.
- Individual sporting activities are allowed in public spaces, with obligatory social distancing measures. Group sporting activities are also allowed with up to 200 spectators who must still maintain social distancing measures.
- Internal maritime transport is reinstated for people and goods, with appropriate prevention measures, including the wearing of masks. Recreational maritime transport is also allowed.
- Religious rites are allowed under certain strict conditions, including:

– A maximum of one person per 10m ², inside the religious edifice;

– People must maintain a minimum of two meters distance between themselves;

– The maximum number of people allowed inside must be posted at the entrance;

– Everyone except for the religious leader giving rites must wear masks; and

– Hand disinfectant must be provided at each entrance and exit, and should be used by all who enter

- The maximum number of individuals gathering in people's homes is 20 persons.
- All schools and universities remain closed.
- Daycare centers are permitted to reopen under conditions.
- Public gatherings (including weddings and funerals) are allowed outdoors and indoors, with the attendance of no more than 200 people, who are obliged to respect a physical distance of at least two meters and other recommendations, in accordance with corresponding instructions of Public Health Institute of Montenegro.

Cinemas and theaters are reopened.

Montenegro Airlines has announced that commercial flights will resume with limited destinations on or about 15 June.

- The movement of goods into Montenegro, as well as in transit to other countries, remains unhindered, but subject to special sanitary health controls.
- Limiting the number of customers in relation to the size of a retail outlet. Only one customer at a time is allowed in a retail space less than ten square meters. In a retail outlet larger than ten square meters, regardless of surface, there can be no more than 50 customers at one time.
- Obligation of commercial establishments to post a notice at their entrance indicating the maximum number of persons allowed inside at the same time and to implement these measures by providing the space and marking a distance of at least two meters between persons waiting to enter or checkout.
- Limiting the number of customers who can be in a market (i.e. farmer's/green market) to 100.
- Validity of expired driver's licenses is automatically extended if the driver possesses a valid insurance policy and proof of valid vehicle technical inspection until 1 July.
- Employers are encouraged to allow staff to continue remote work when possible and to allow flextime for parents of children under 11 years old.
- Obligation of commercial establishments to ensure the implementation of health protection measures for their employees, as prescribed by the Institute of Public Health of Montenegro.
- Enforcing epidemiological measures for people performing construction, including social distance between employees and other measures of occupational health and safety.
- Suspension of the €2 fee for official birth certificates.

Montenegro Entry and Exit Requirements:

Land Borders with Bosnia and Herzegovina, Albania, Serbia, Kosovo and Croatia are opened. No testing required for crossing into Montenegro, 14-day quarantine is required for visitors entering from countries with >25 confirmed cases on 100,000 population.

Group	Municipalities	Measures	Map
I	Plav, Gusinje, Petnjica, Herceg Novi, Žabljak, Tivat, Kotor, Plužine, Budva, Tuzi, Rožaje, Bar, Ulcinj, Bijelo Polje, Cetinje, Podgorica, Danilovgrad, Nikšić, Mojkovac, Berane, Kolašin, Pljevlja, Šavnik, Andrijevica	Free movement is allowed without any restraints; Grocery stores can work without any restraints; Other stores can work without any restraints; Restaurants can work without any restraints; Intercity traffic is allowed without any restraints	
II	none	Free movement from 5:00 am until 12:00 pm; Grocery stores can work from 7:00 am until 10:00 pm in all days except Sundays; Other stores can work from 7:00 am until 10:00 pm in all days except Sundays; Restaurants can work from 7:00 am until 11:00 pm; Intercity traffic is disallowed	
III	none	Free movement from 5:00 am until 10:00 pm; Grocery stores can work from 7:00 am until 9:00 pm; Other stores are closed; Restaurants are closed; Intercity traffic is disallowed	

== See also ==
- COVID-19 pandemic by country and territory
- COVID-19 pandemic in Europe
