= Statehood Day (Montenegro) =

National holiday

- Official name: Дан државности Dan državnosti
- Observed by: Montenegro
- Significance: commemorate the day in 1878 on which the Berlin Congress recognized Montenegro as an independent state
- Date: 13 July
- Next time: 13 July 2026
- Frequency: annual

Statehood Day (Montenegrin and Serbian: Дан државности/Dan državnosti) is a holiday that occurs every year on 13 July in Montenegro to commemorate the day in 1878 on which the Berlin Congress recognized the Principality of Montenegro as the twenty-seventh independent state in the world. The date is also celebrated to commemorate the 1941 uprising against Italian occupation.

Statehood Day is not to be confused with Montenegro's Independence Day, which is held each year on 21 May in honor of the 2006 referendum that indicated that 55.5% of Montenegrins were in favor of becoming a sovereign nation.

== See also ==
- Berlin Congress (1878)
- 13 July Uprising (1941)
- Independence Day (Montenegro) (2006)
