= History of Montenegro =

The early written records of the history of Montenegro begin with Illyria and its various kingdoms until the Roman Republic incorporated the region into the province of Illyricum (later Dalmatia and Praevalitana) after the Illyro-Roman Wars.

In the Early Middle Ages, Slavic migration led to several Slavic states. In the 9th century, there were three principalities on the territory of Montenegro: Duklja, roughly corresponding to the southern half, Travunia, the west, and Rascia, the north. In 1042, Stefan Vojislav led a revolt that resulted in the independence of Duklja and the establishment of the Vojislavljević dynasty. Duklja reached its zenith under Vojislav's son, Mihailo (1046–81), and his grandson Bodin (1081–1101). By the 13th century, Zeta had replaced Duklja when referring to the realm. In the late 14th century, southern Montenegro (Zeta) came under the rule of the Balšić noble family, then the Crnojević noble family, and by the 15th century, Zeta was more often referred to as Crna Gora (Venetian: monte negro).

Large portions fell under the control of the Ottoman Empire from 1496 to 1878. Parts were controlled by the Republic of Venice. From 1516 until 1852 the prince-bishops (vladikas) of Cetinje were the rulers. The House of Petrović-Njegoš ruled until 1918. From 1918, it was a part of Yugoslavia. On the basis of an independence referendum held on 21 May 2006, Montenegro declared independence on 3 June of that year.

== Early history ==
Roman Roads in Montenegro

Before the arrival of the Slavonic peoples in the Balkans during the 6th century AD, the area now known as Montenegro was inhabited principally by the Illyrians.

During the Bronze Age, the Illirii, probably the southernmost Illyrian tribe of that time, that gave their name to the entire group were living near Skadar lake on the border of Albania and Montenegro and neighboring with the Greek tribes south. Along the seaboard of the Adriatic, the movement of peoples that was typical of the ancient Mediterranean world ensured the settlement of a mixture of colonists, traders, and those in search of territorial conquest. Substantial Greek colonies were established on the 6th and 7th centuries BC and Celts are known to have settled there in the 4th century BC. During the 3rd century BC, an indigenous Illyrian kingdom emerged with its capital at Scutari. The Romans mounted several punitive expeditions against local pirates and finally conquered the Illyrian kingdom in the 2nd century BC, annexing it to the province of Illyricum.

The division of the Roman Empire between Roman and Byzantine rule – and subsequently between the Latin and Greek churches – was marked by a line that ran northward from Shkodra through modern Montenegro, symbolizing the status of this region as a perpetual marginal zone between the economic, cultural, and political worlds of the Mediterranean. As Roman power declined, this part of the Dalmatian coast suffered from intermittent ravages by various semi-nomadic invaders, especially the Goths in the late 5th century and the Avars during the 6th century. These soon were supplanted by the Slavs, who became widely established in Dalmatia by the middle of the 7th century. Because the terrain was extremely rugged and lacked any major sources of wealth such as mineral riches, the area that is now Montenegro became a haven for residual groups of earlier settlers, including some tribes who had escaped Romanisation.

== Middle Ages ==
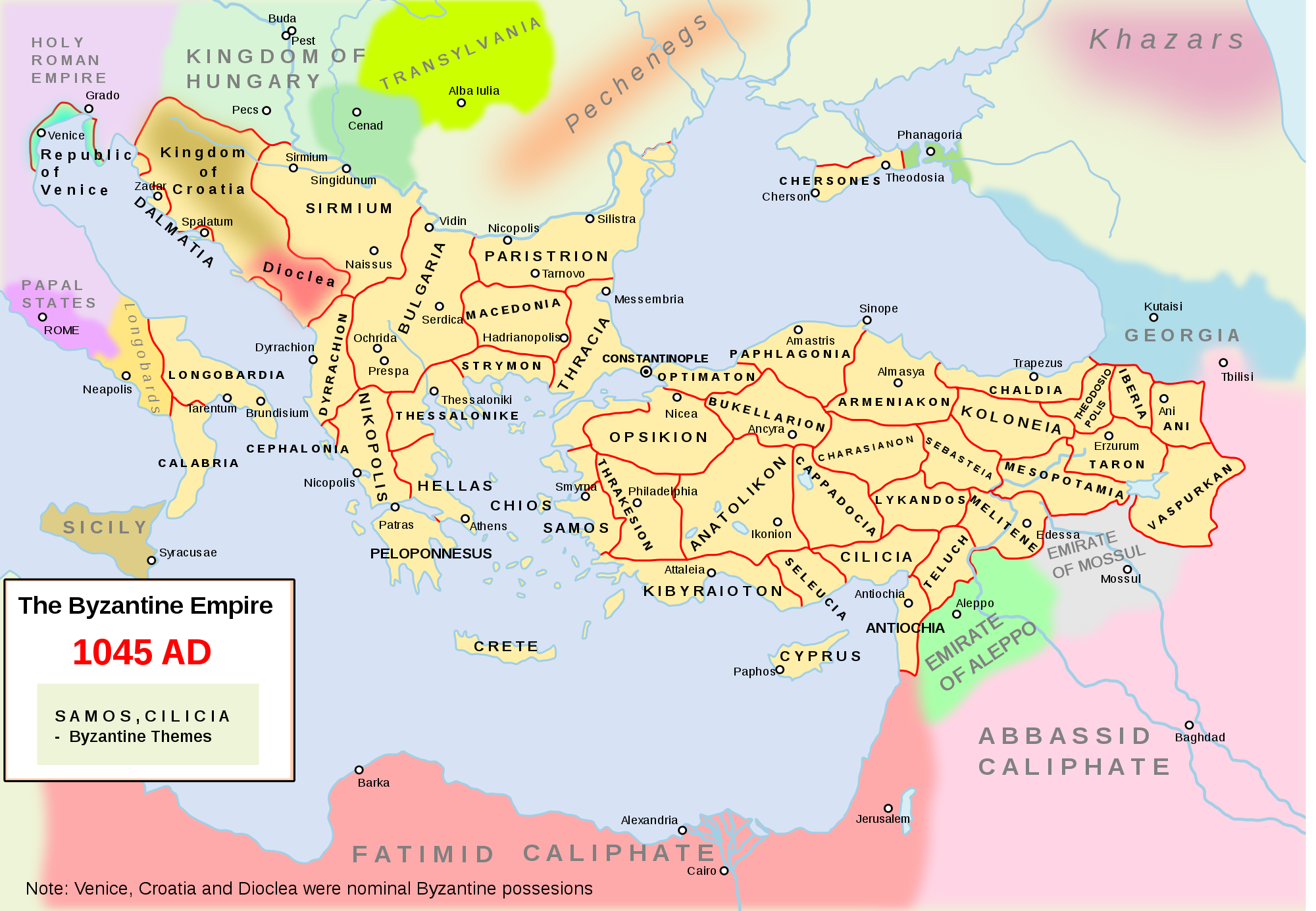
Duklja in the 11th century

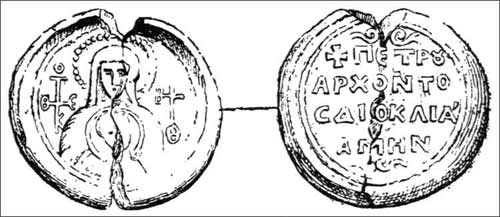
The seal of prince Peter of Duklja from the 9th century. Inscription says "Peter, archon of Diokleia, Amen".

In the second half of the 6th century, Slavs migrated from the Bay of Kotor to the River of Bojana and the hinterland of it as well as surround the Skadar lake. They formed the Principality of Doclea. Under the following missions of Cyril and Methodius, the population was Christianised. The Slavic tribes organised into a semi-independent dukedom of Duklja (Doclea) by the 9th century.

After facing subsequent Bulgarian domination, the people were split as the Doclean brother-archonts split the lands among each other after 900. Prince Časlav Klonimirović of the Serbian Vlastimirović dynasty extended his influence over Doclea in the 10th century. After the fall of the Serbian Realm in 960, the Docleans faced a renewed Byzantine occupation through to the 11th century. The local ruler, Jovan Vladimir Dukljanski, whose cult still remains in the Orthodox Christian tradition, was at the time struggling to ensure independence.

Stefan Vojislav started an uprising against the Byzantine domination and gained a huge victory against the army of several Byzantine strategoi in Tudjemili (Bar) in 1042, which put to an end the Byzantine influence over the Doclea. In the 1054 Great Schism, the Doclea fell on the side of the Catholic Church. Bar became a Bishopric in 1067. In 1077, Pope Gregory VII recognised Duklja as an independent state, acknowledging its King Mihailo (Michael, of the Vojislavljević dynasty founded by nobleman Stefan Vojislav) as Rex Doclea (King of Duklja). Later on Mihailo sent his troops, led by his son Bodin, in 1072 to assist the uprising of Slavs in Macedonia. In 1082, after numerous pleas the Bar Bishopric of Bar was upgraded to an Archbishopric.

The expansions of the Kings of the Vojislavljević dynasty led to the control over the other Slavic lands, including Zahumlje, Bosnia and Rascia. The might of the Doclea declined and they generally became subjected to the Grand Princes of Rascia in the 12th century. Stefan Nemanja was born in 1117 in Ribnica (today Podgorica). In 1168, as the Serbian Grand Zhupan, Stefan Nemanja took Doclea. In charters of Vranjina Monastery during the 14th century the ethnic groups which are mentioned were Albanians (Arbanas), Vlahs, Latins (Catholic citizen) and Serbs.

=== Duklja (Zeta) within the Nemanjić State (1186–1360) ===
The region of Duklja (Zeta) was ruled by the Nemanjić dynasty from c. 1186 until c. 1360. In this period Zeta was administered by members of the Serbian royalty as a crown land.

=== Zeta under the Balšići (1360–1421) ===
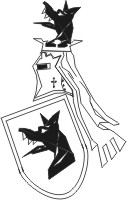
Coat of arms of the House of Balšić

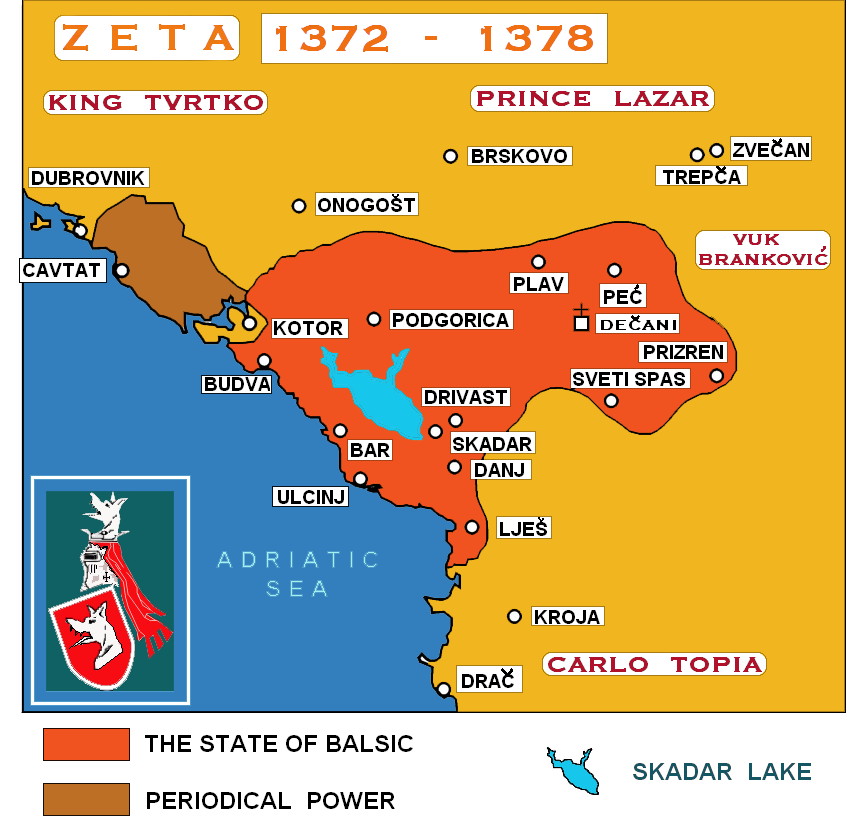
Zeta under the Balšić Dynasty in the 14th century

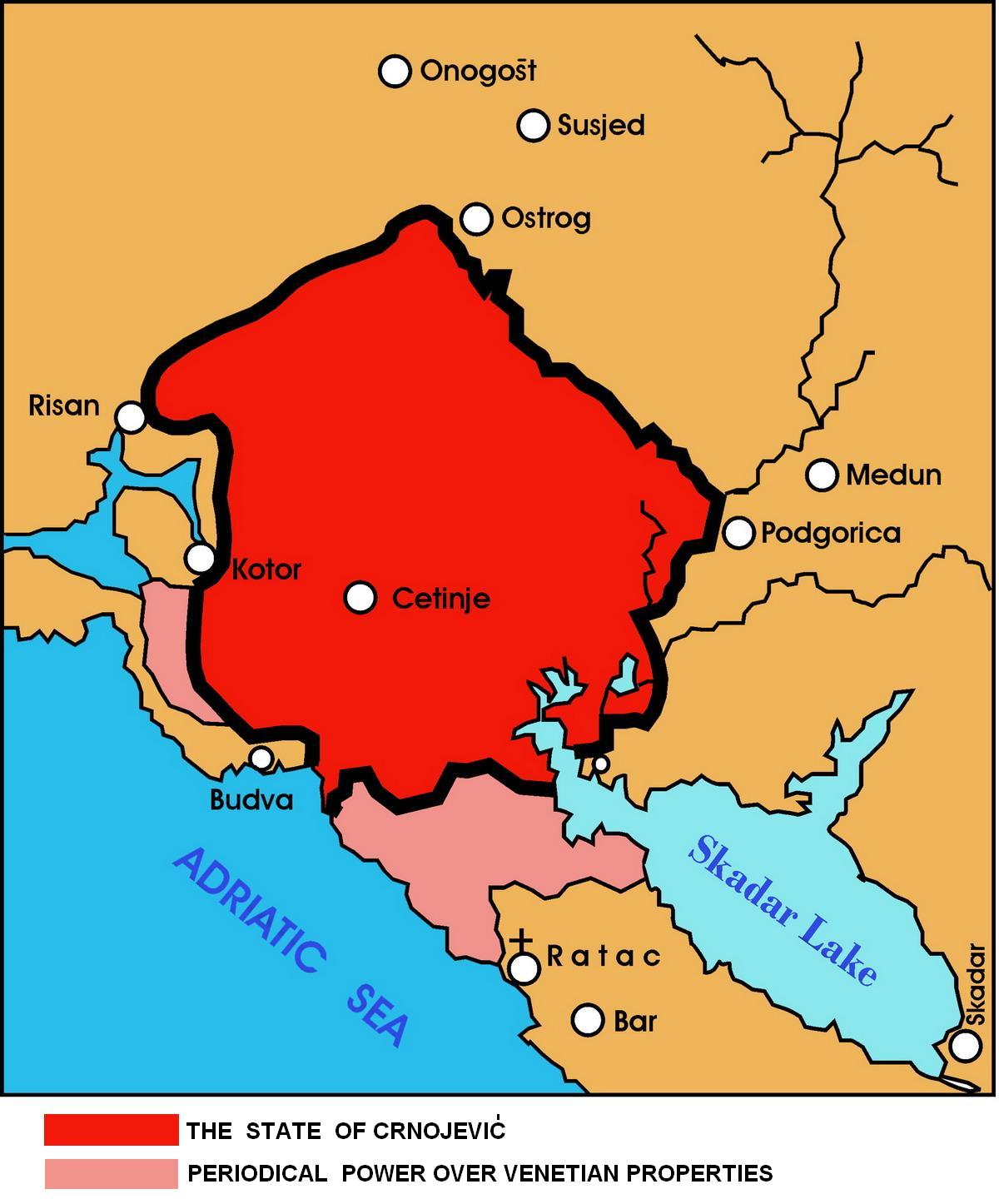
Zeta under the Crnojević Dynasty in the 15th century

The Principality of Zeta was ruled by the house of Balšić from c. 1356 until 1421.

=== Zeta within the Serbian Despotate (1421–1451) ===
After the death of Balša III, last representative of House of Balšić, Zeta joined the Serbian Despotate in 1421.

=== Zeta under the Crnojevići (1451–1496) ===
The Principality of Zeta was ruled by the house of Crnojević Dynasty from c. 1451 until 1496. It is believed that the name Crna Gora (Montenegro) originated during their rule. The Crnojevići were driven out from Zeta by the Ottomans and forced to retreat above the Gulf of Kotor where they built a monastery and a royal court in Cetinje, the future royal capital of Montenegro, before eventually fleeing to Venice. In 1496, Ottomans conquered Zeta and consolidated it into the newly established Sanjak of Montenegro, thereby ending its principality.

=== The Venetian coastal Montenegro ===
Territory of Venetian Albania

After the dramatic fall of the Western Roman Empire (476), the romanised Illyrians of the coast of Dalmatia survived the barbarian invasions of the Avars in the 6th century and were only nominally under the influence of the Slavs in the 7th and 8th centuries. In the last centuries of the first millennium, these Romanised Illyrians started to develop their own neo-Latin language, called Dalmatian language, around their small coastal villages that were growing with maritime commerce.

Venice started to take control of the southern Dalmatia around the 10th century, quickly assimilating the Dalmatian language with Venetian. By the 14th century the Republic of Venice was able to create a territorial continuity around the Bay of Kotor (Cattaro).

== Early modern period ==
The Republic of Venice dominated the coasts of today's Montenegro from 1420 to 1797. In those four centuries the area around the Cattaro (Kotor) became part of Venetian Albania.

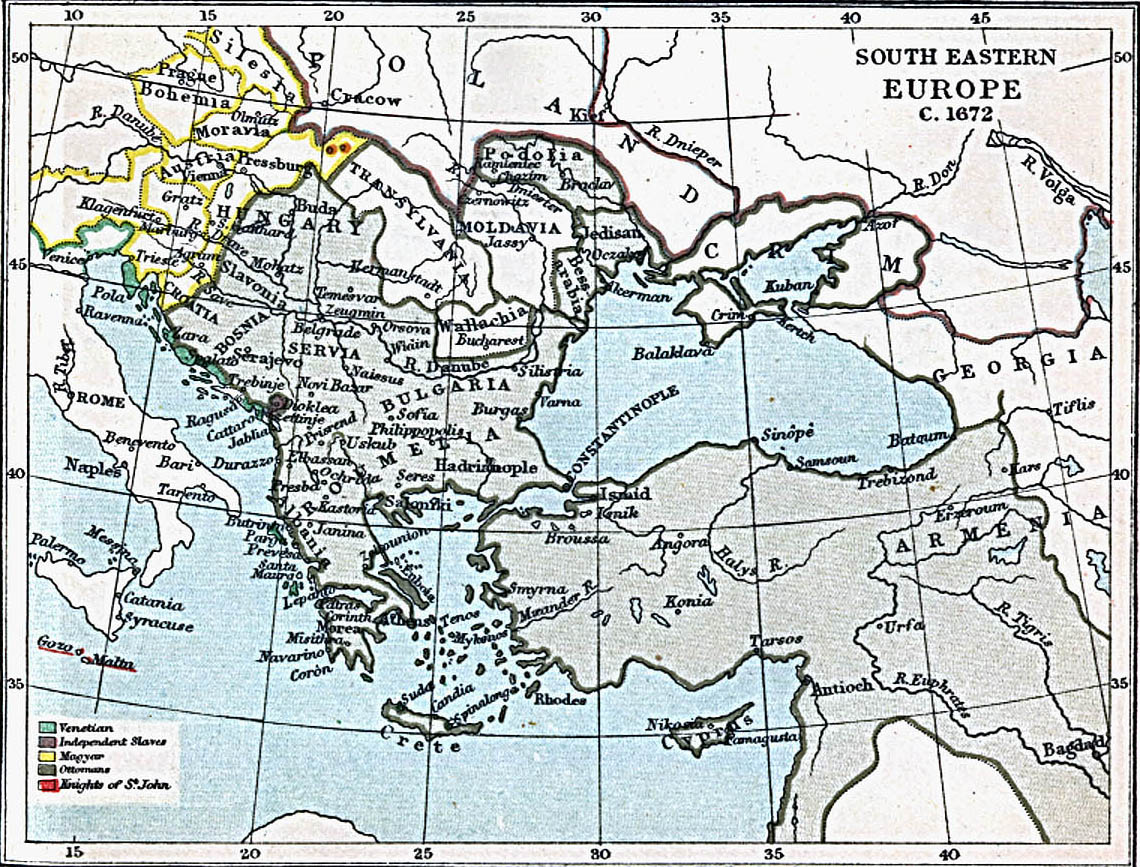
Map of south-eastern Europe ca. 1670, Montenegro is represented in purple dot

=== Struggle for maintaining independence (1496–1878) ===
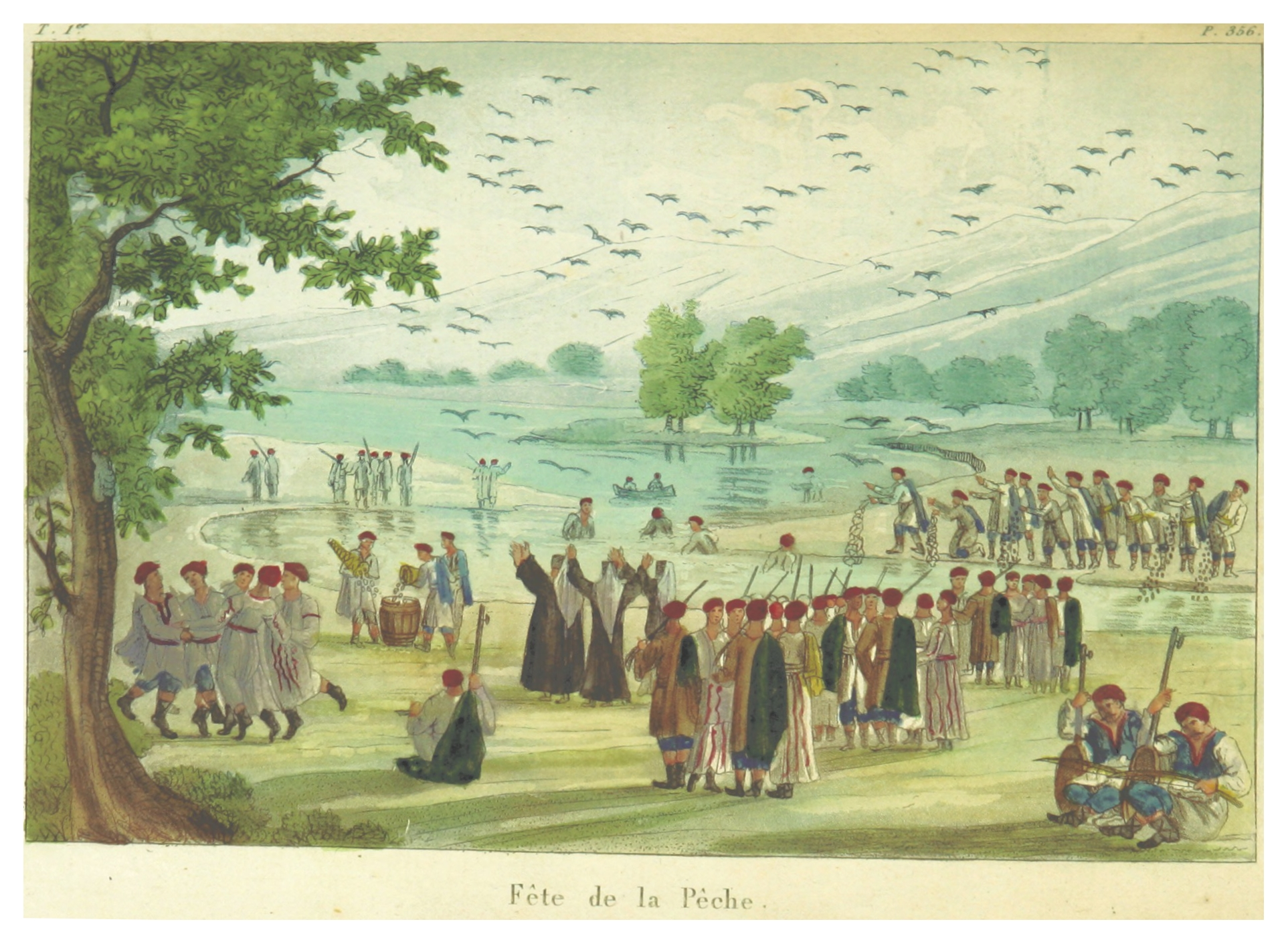
A Montenegrin fishing festival depicted in 1820

Part of today's Montenegro, called Sandžak (which was not historically part of Montenegro until 1912), was under direct Ottoman control from 1498 to 1912, while westernmost part of coastal Montenegro was under Venetian control and the rest of Montenegro was autonomous from 1516, when Vladika Vavila was elected as ruler of Montenegro by its clans, and licensed by the Ottoman Empire it became a theocratic state and not secular. Only small town centers like Cetinje and Njegusi were controlled by Ottomans, but mountains and rural area were autonomous and controlled by several Montenegrin clans, which were warrior societies, but paying a special tax to the Ottoman Empire.

In 1514, the Ottoman territory of Montenegro was proclaimed as a separate Sanjak of Montenegro, by the order of Sultan Beyazid II. The first Sanjak-beg (governor) who was chosen was Ivan Crnojević's son Staniša (Skenderbeg Crnojević), who converted to Islam, and governed until his death in 1528. Despite Skenderbeg's emphasized cruelty, the Ottomans did not have effective power in Montenegro. Vladika Vavil was elected in 1516 as Montenegrin prince-bishop by the Montenegrin people and the patriarch of Belgrade.

==== Elective Vladikas (1516–1696) ====
For 180 years after their first appointment, the Vladikas were elected by the Serbian Patriarchate of Peć and the clans — an arrangement which was ultimately abandoned in favour of the hereditary system in 1696. For most of this period the Montenegrin people were in constant struggle for its autonomy inside of the Ottoman Empire.

A pretender to Montenegrin throne, one of the Crnojević family who had converted to Islam, invaded Montenegro just as Staniša, thirty years before, and with the same result. Vukotić, the civil governor, repulsed the attack of Turks. Montenegrins, encouraged by the victory, besieged Jajce in modern-day Bosnia and Herzegovina, where the Hungarian garrison was closely hemmed in by the Ottoman army. The Turks were too much occupied with the Hungarian war to take revenge. The next Ottoman invasion of Montenegro took place in 1570.

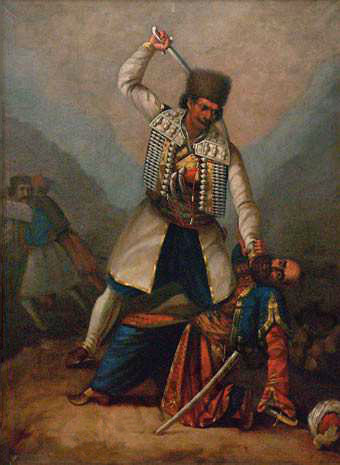
Montenegrin leader Bajo Pivljanin decapitates Turkish officer.

The national historians are silent upon the subject of the Haraç (tax in Ottoman Empire), which the invaders are said to have exacted from the inhabitants of the free mountains. The refusal of high-spirited Montenegrin clans to pay tax any longer was the cause of the Pasha's invasion during the reign of the Hadjuk Bishop Rufim, when the Turks were driven back with heavy loss in Battle of Lješkopolje in 1604. About 1500 Montenegrin warriors attacked the Turkish camp on Lješkopolje field during the night, which counted 10.000 Ottoman soldiers.

In 1613, Arslan Pasha gathered army of over 40,000 men to attack part of Old Montenegro. Ottoman soldiers were twice as numerous as whole population of Old Montenegro. On 10 September the Montenegrins met the Turkish army, on the same spot Skenderbeg Crnojević was defeated nearly a century ago. The Montenegrins, although assisted by some neighbouring tribes, counted 4000 and were completely outnumbered. However, the Montenegrins managed to defeat the Turks. Arslan Pasha was wounded, and the heads of his second-in-command and a hundred other Turkish officers were carried off and stuck on the ramparts of Cetinje. The Ottoman troops retreated in disorder; many were drowned in the waters of the Morača. Others were killed by Montenegrin pursuers.

Much light is thrown upon the condition of Montenegro at this period and the causes of its invariable success in war even against fearful odds are explained by the accounts of a contemporary writer, Mariano Bolizza. This author, a patrician of Venice, residing at Kotor in the early part of the seventeenth century, spent a considerable time in the Old Montenegro, and published in 1614 a description of Cetinje. At the time, the whole male population of Cetinje available for war consisted of 8,027 persons, distributed among ninety-three villages.

The condition of the country at this period was naturally unsettled. War was the chief occupation of its inhabitants from sheer necessity, and the arts of peace languished. The printing-press, so active a century earlier, had ceased to exist; the control of the Prince-Bishop over the five nahije (sing. nahija, from the Turkish nahiyah, i.e. "district"), which then composed the principality, was weak; the capital itself consisted of only a few houses. Still, there was a system of local government. Each nahija was divided into tribes (Serbian: plemena), each presided over by a chief (Serbian: knez), who acted as a judge in disputes between the tribesmen.

== Modern history ==
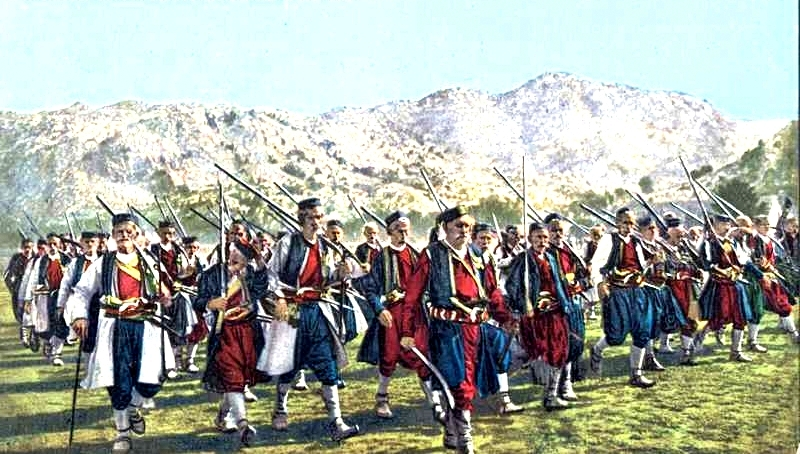
Warriors from Chevo clan marching to battle.

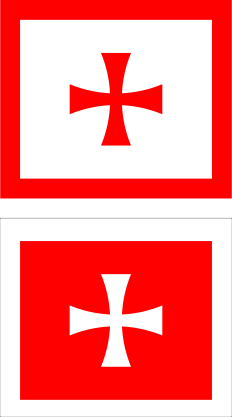
Flags of Montenegro, about 1800 AD

Petar Petrović Njegoš, an influential vladika, reigned in the first half of the 19th century. In 1851 Danilo Petrović Njegoš became vladika, but in 1852 he married and renounced his ecclesiastical character, assuming the title of knjaz (Prince) Danilo I, and transformed his land into a secular principality.

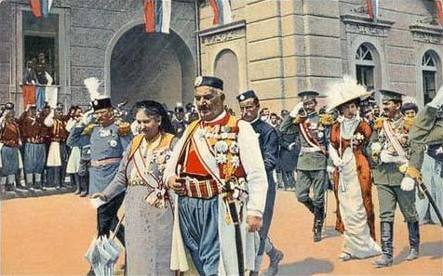
Proclamation of the Kingdom of Montenegro.

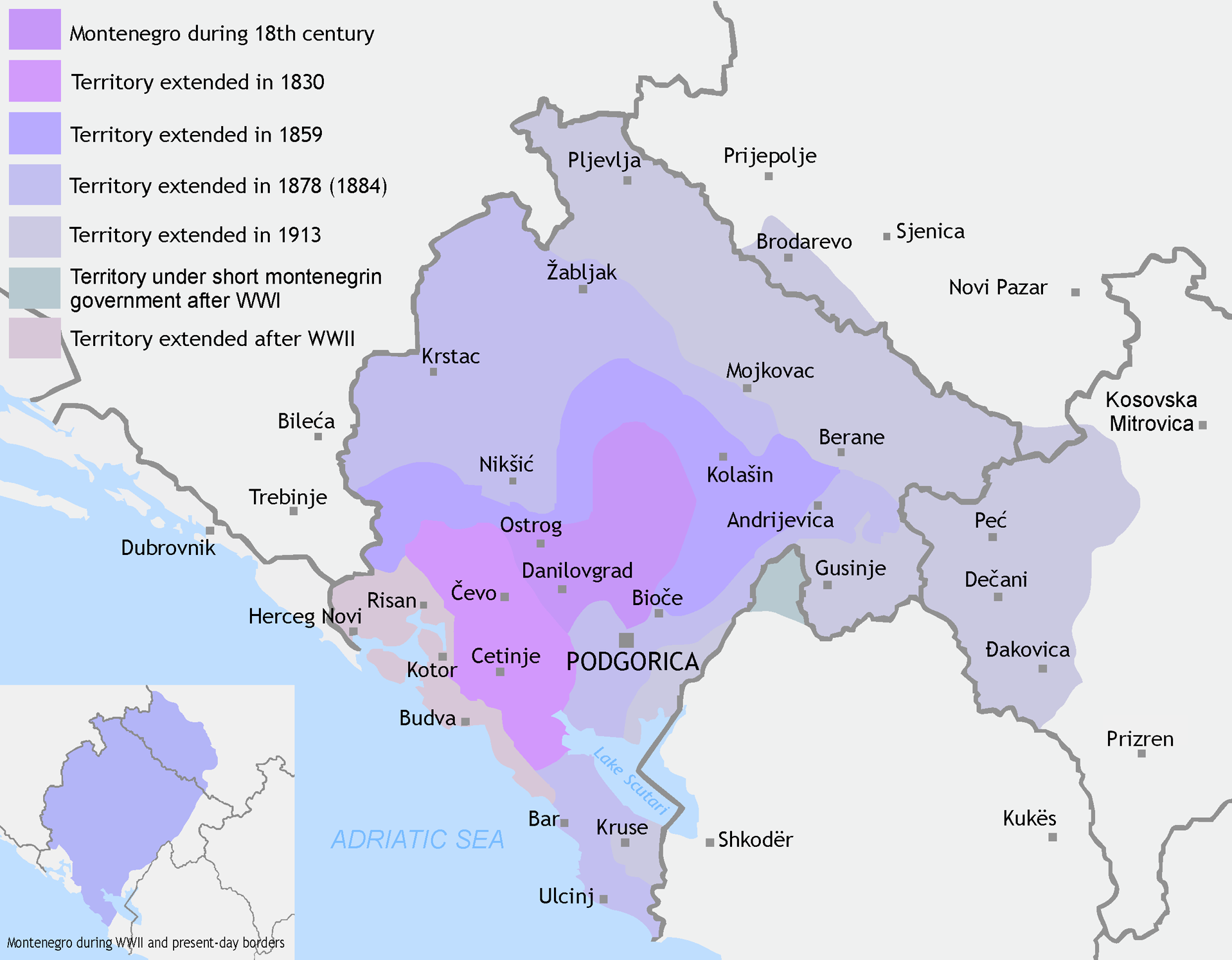
Montenegro territorial expansion (1830–1944)

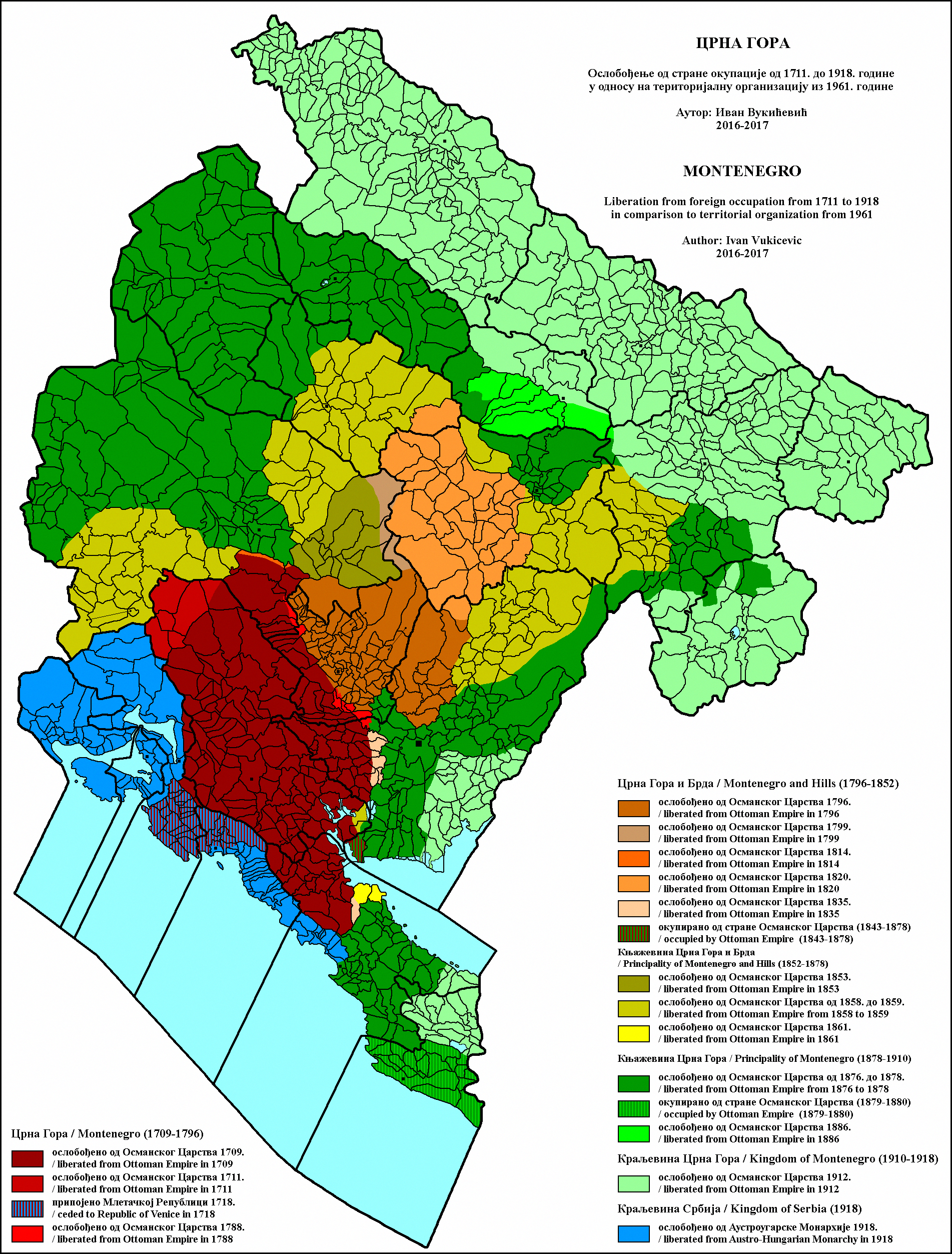
Liberation of Montenegro from foreign occupation from 1711 to 1918

Following the assassination of Danilo by Todor Kadić in Kotor, in 1860, the Montenegrins proclaimed Nicholas I as his successor on August 14 of that year. In 1861–1862, Nicholas engaged in an unsuccessful war against the Ottoman Empire.

Following the Herzegovinian Uprising, partly initiated by his clandestine activities, he yet again declared war on Turkey. The Serbia joined Montenegro, but it was defeated by Turkish forces that same year. Russia now joined in and decisively routed the Turks in 1877–78. The Treaty of San Stefano (March 1878) was highly advantageous to Montenegro, as well as Russia, Serbia, Romania and Bulgaria. However, the gains were somewhat trimmed by the Treaty of Berlin (1878). In the end Montenegro was internationally recognized as an independent state, its territory was effectively doubled by the addition of 4,900 square kilometres (1,900 sq mi), the port of Bar and all the waters of Montenegro were closed to warships of all nations; and the administration of the maritime and sanitary police on the coast was placed in the hands of Austria.

Under Nicholas I the country was also granted its first constitution (1905) and was elevated to the rank of kingdom in 1910.

In the Balkan Wars (1912–1913), Montenegro did make further territorial gains by splitting Sanjak with Serbia. However, the captured city of Skadar had to be given up to the new state of Albania at the insistence of the Great Powers despite the Montenegrins having lost 10,000 lives for the conquest of the town from the Ottoman-Albanian forces of Essad Pasha Toptani.

=== World War I ===
Montenegro suffered severely in World War I. Shortly after Austria-Hungary declared war on Serbia (28 July 1914), Montenegro lost little time in declaring war on the Central Powers – on Austria-Hungary in the first instance – on 6 August 1914, despite Austrian diplomacy promising to cede Shkoder to Montenegro if it remained neutral. For purposes of coordination in the fight against the enemy army, Serbian General Božidar Janković was named head of High Command of both Serbian and Montenegrin armies. Montenegro received 30 artillery pieces and financial help of 17 million dinars from Serbia. France contributed a colonial detachment of 200 men located in Cetinje at the beginning of war, as well as two radio-stations – located on top of Mount Lovćen and in Podgorica. Until 1915 France supplied Montenegro with necessary war material and food through the port of Bar, which was blockaded by Austrian battleships and submarines. In 1915 Italy took over this role, running supplies unsuccessfully and irregularly across the line Shengjin-Bojana-Lake Skadar, an unsecured route because of constant attacks by Albanian irregulars organised by Austrian agents. Lack of vital materials eventually led Montenegro to surrender.

Austria-Hungary dispatched a separate army to invade Montenegro and to prevent a junction of the Serbian and Montenegrin armies. This force, however, was repulsed, and from the top of the strongly fortified Lovćen, the Montenegrins carried on the bombardment of Kotor held by the enemy. The Austro-Hungarian army managed to capture the town of Pljevlja while on the other hand the Montenegrins took Budva, then under Austrian control. The Serbian victory at the Battle of Cer (15–24 August 1914) diverted enemy forces from Sandžak, and Pljevlja came into Montenegrin hands again. On August 10, 1914, the Montenegrin infantry delivered a strong attack against the Austrian garrisons, but they did not succeed in making good the advantage they first gained. They successfully resisted the Austrians in the second invasion of Serbia (September 1914) and almost succeeded in seizing Sarajevo. With the beginning of the third Austro-Hungarian invasion, however, the Montenegrin army had to retire before greatly superior numbers, and Austro-Hungarian, Bulgarian and German armies finally overran Serbia (December 1915). However, the Serbian army survived, and led by King Peter I of Serbia, started retreating across Albania. In order to support the Serbian retreat, the Montenegrin army, led by Janko Vukotić, engaged in the Battle of Mojkovac (6–7 January 1916). Montenegro also suffered a large scale invasion (January 1916) and for the remainder of the war remained in the possession of the Central Powers. See Serbian Campaign (World War I) for details. The Austrian officer Viktor Weber Edler von Webenau served as the military governor of Montenegro between 1916 and 1917. Afterwards Heinrich Clam-Martinic filled this position.

King Nicholas fled to Italy (January 1916) and then to Antibes, France; the government transferred its operations to Bordeaux. Eventually the Allies liberated Montenegro from the Austrians. A newly convened National Assembly of Podgorica (Podgorička skupština, Подгоричка скупштина), accused the King of seeking a separate peace with the enemy and consequently deposed him, banned his return and decided that Montenegro should join the Kingdom of Serbia on December 1, 1918. A part of the former Montenegrin military forces still loyal to the King started a rebellion against the amalgamation, the Christmas Uprising (7 January 1919).

=== Yugoslavia ===
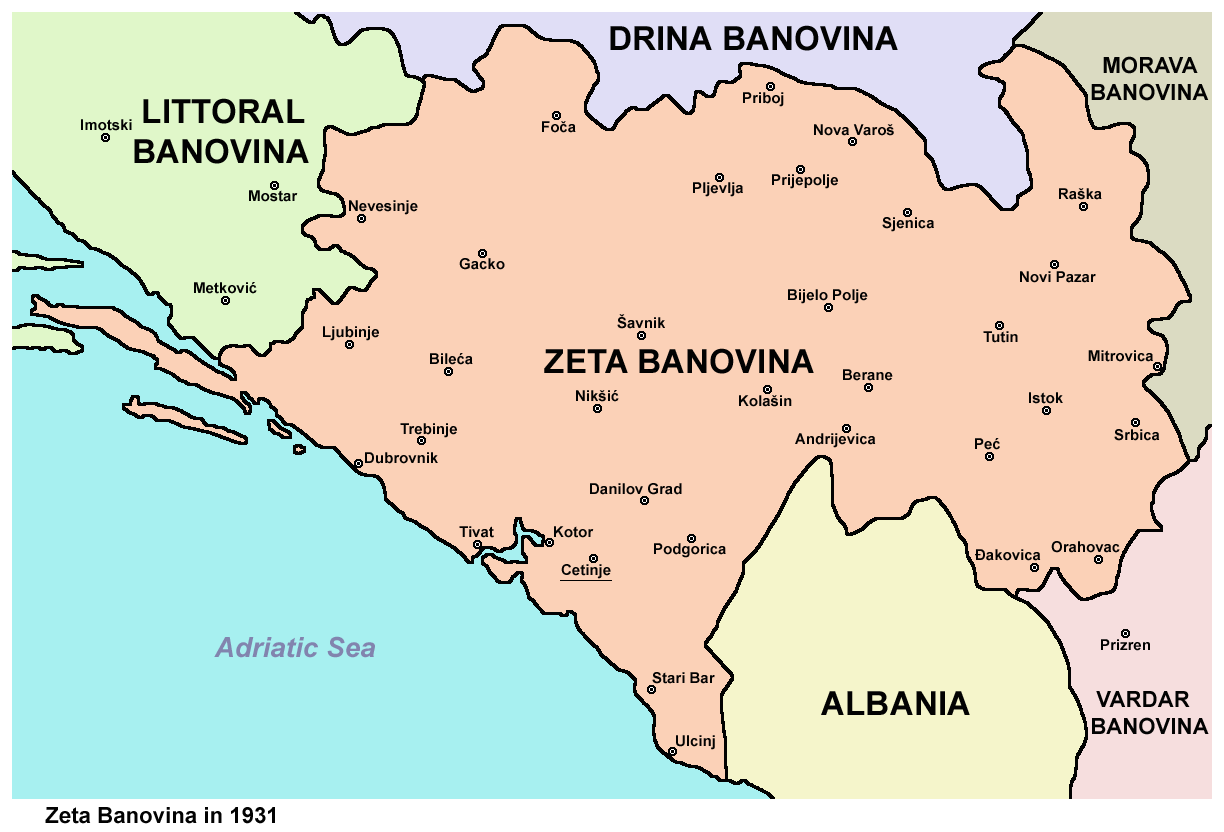
Map of Zeta Banovina

In the period between the two World Wars, Nikola's grandson, King Alexander I dominated the Yugoslav government. In 1922 Montenegro became part of Zeta area and later Zeta Banate. The administrative seat of banate became former Montenegrin capital Cetinje. During this period, Montenegrin people were still divided between politics of Greens and Whites. The dominant political parties in Montenegro were Democratic Party, People's Radical Party, Communist Party of Yugoslavia, Alliance of Agrarians, Montenegrin Federalist Party, and the Yugoslav Republican Party. During this period, two main problems in Montenegro were lost sovereignty and bad economic situation. All of the parties except Federalists had the same attitude towards the first question, favoring centralism to federalism. The other question was more complex, but the fact on which all of the parties agreed is that the situation was far from good and that the government did nothing to improve the life in area. Devastated by war, Montenegro was never paid the reparations to which it had right as one of the Allies in the Great War. Most of the population lived in rural areas, but the smaller population of citizens had better standards of life. There was no infrastructure and industry was formed of few companies.

=== The puppet "Kingdom of Montenegro" and World War II ===
During World War II, Italy under Benito Mussolini occupied Montenegro in 1941 and annexed it to the Kingdom of Italy in the area of Kotor (Cattaro), where there was a small Venetian speaking population. (The Queen of Italy – Elena of Montenegro – was daughter of the former king of Montenegro and was born in Cetinje.)

The English historian Denis Mack Smith wrote that the Queen of Italy (considered the most influential Montenegrin woman in history) convinced her husband the King of Italy Victor Emmanuel III to impose on Mussolini the creation of an independent Montenegro, against the wishes of the fascist Croats and Albanians (who wanted to enlarge their countries with the Montenegrin territories). Her nephew Prince Michael of Montenegro never accepted the offered crown, pledging loyalty to his nephew King Peter II of Yugoslavia.

The puppet Kingdom of Montenegro was created under fascist control while Krsto Zrnov Popović returned from his exile in Rome in 1941 to attempt to lead the Zelenaši ("Green" party), who supported the reinstatement of the Montenegrin monarchy. This militia was called the Lovćen Brigade. Montenegro was ravaged by a terrible guerrilla war, mainly after Nazi Germany replaced the defeated Italians in September 1943.

During World War II, as was the case in many other parts of Yugoslavia, Montenegro was involved in some sort of civil war. Besides Montenegrin Greens, the two main factions were the Chetnik Yugoslav army, who swore allegiance to the government in exile and consisted mainly of Montenegrins who declared themselves as Serbs (many of its members were Montenegrin Whites) and Yugoslav Partisans, whose aim was the creation of a Socialist Yugoslavia after the war. Since both factions shared some similarities in their goals, particularly those relating to a unified Yugoslavia and anti-Axis resistance, the two sides joined hands and in 1941 started the 13th July uprising, the first organised uprising in occupied Europe. This occurred just two months after Yugoslavia capitulated, and liberated most of Montenegrin territory, but the rebels were unable to regain control of major towns and cities. After the failed attempts to liberate the towns of Pljevlja and Kolasin, the Italians, reinforced by Germans, recaptured all insurgent territory. At the leadership level, disagreements regarding state policy (Centralist monarchy vs. Federal Socialist republic) eventually led to a split between the two sides; they then became enemies from thereon. Constantly, both factions were trying to gain support among the population. The monarchist Chetniks had influential scholars and revolutionaries among their supporters, such as Blažo Đukanović, Zaharije Ostojić, Radojica Perišić, Petar Baćović, Mirko Lalatovic, and Bajo Stanišić, the hero of the anti-fascist uprising. However, eventually the Chetniks in Montenegro lost support among the population, as did other Chetnik factions within Yugoslavia. The de facto leader of the Chetniks in Montenegro, Pavle Djurisic, along with other prominent figures of the movement like Dusan Arsovic and Đorđe Lašić, were held responsible for massacres of Muslim population in eastern Bosnia and Sandzak during 1944. Their ideology of a homogeneous Serbia within Yugoslavia proved to be a major obstacle in recruiting liberals, minorities, and Montenegrins who regarded Montenegro as a nation with its own identity. These factors, in addition to the fact that some Chetniks were negotiating with the Axis, led to the Chetnik Yugoslav army losing support among the Allies in 1943. In the same year, Italy, who was until then in charge of the occupied zone, capitulated and was replaced by Germany, and the fighting continued.

Podgorica was liberated by the socialist Partisans on 19 December 1944, and the war of liberation had been won. Josip Broz Tito acknowledged Montenegro's massive contribution to the war against the Axis powers by establishing it as one of the six republics of Yugoslavia.

=== Montenegro within Socialist Yugoslavia ===
From 1945 to 1992, Montenegro became a constituent republic of the Socialist Federal Republic of Yugoslavia; it was the smallest republic in the federation and had the lowest population. Montenegro became economically stronger than ever, since it gained help from federal funds as an under-developed Republic, and it became a tourist destination as well. After war years proved turbulent and were marked by political eliminations. Krsto Zrnov Popović, the leader of Greens was assassinated in 1947, and 10 years later, in 1957, the last Montenegrin Chetnik Vladimir Šipčić was also murdered. During this period Montenegrin Communists such as Veljko Vlahović, Svetozar Vukmanović-Tempo, Vladimir Popović and Jovo Kapicić held key positions in the federal government of Yugoslavia. In 1948 Yugoslavia faced the Tito–Stalin split, a period of high tensions between Yugoslavia and the USSR caused by disagreements about each country's influences on its neighbours, and the resolution of Informbiro. Political turmoil began within both the communist party and the nation. Pro-Soviet communists faced prosecution and imprisonment in various prisons across Yugoslavia, notably Goli Otok. Many Montenegrins, due to their traditional allegiance with Russia, declared themselves as Soviet-orientated. This political split in the communist party saw the downfall of many important communist leaders, including Montenegrins Arso Jovanović and Vlado Dapčević. Many of the people imprisoned during this period, regardless of nationality, were innocent – this was later recognised by the Yugoslav government. 1954 saw the expulsion of prominent Montenegrin politician Milovan Đilas from the communist party for criticising party leaders for forming a "new ruling class" within, Yugoslavia along with Peko Dapčević.

Through the second half of the 1940s and the whole of the 1950s, the country underwent infrastructural rejuvenation thanks to federal funding. Montenegro's historic capital Cetinje was replaced with Podgorica, which in the inter-war period became the biggest city in the Republic – although it was practically in ruins due to heavy bombing in the last stages of WW II. Podgorica had a more favorable geographical position within Montenegro, and in 1947 the seat of the Republic was moved to the city, now named Titograd in honor to Marshal Tito. Cetinje received the title of 'hero city' within Yugoslavia. Youth work actions built a railway between the two biggest cities of Titograd and Nikšić, as well as an embankment over Skadar lake linking the capital with the major port of Bar. The port of Bar was also rebuilt after being mined during the German retreat in 1944. Other ports that faced infrastructural improvement were Kotor, Risan and Tivat. In 1947 Jugopetrol Kotor was founded. Montenegro's industrialisation was demonstrated through the founding of the electronic company Obod in Cetinje, a steel mill and Trebjesa brewery in Nikšić, and the Podgorica Aluminium Plant in 1969.

=== Breakup of Yugoslavia and the Yugoslav Wars ===
The breakup of communist Yugoslavia (1991–1992) and the introduction of a multi-party political system found Montenegro with a young leadership that had risen to office only a few years earlier in the late 1980s.

In effect, three men ran the republic: Milo Đukanović, Momir Bulatović and Svetozar Marović; all swept into power during the anti-bureaucratic revolution — an administrative coup of sorts within the Yugoslav Communist party, orchestrated by younger party members close to Slobodan Milošević.

All three appeared devout communists on the surface, but they also had sufficient skills and adaptability to understand the dangers of clinging to traditional rigid old-guard tactics in changing times. So when the old Yugoslavia effectively ceased to exist and the multi-party political system replaced it, they quickly repackaged the Montenegrin branch of the old Communist party and renamed it the Democratic Party of Socialists of Montenegro (DPS).

The inheritance of the entire infrastructure, resources and membership of the old Communist party gave the DPS a sizable head start on their opponents in the newly formed parties. It allowed them to win the first multi-party parliamentary election held on 9 and 16 December 1990, and presidential elections held on 9 and 23 December 1990. The party has ruled Montenegro ever since (either alone or as a leading member of different ruling coalitions).

During the early-to-mid-1990s Montenegro's leadership gave considerable support to Milošević's war-effort. Montenegrin reservists fought on the Dubrovnik front line, where Prime Minister Milo Đukanović visited them frequently.

In April 1992, following a referendum, Montenegro decided to join Serbia in forming the Federal Republic of Yugoslavia (FRY), which officially put the Second Yugoslavia to rest.

During the 1991–1995 Bosnian War and Croatian War, Montenegro participated with its police and military forces in the attacks on Dubrovnik, Croatia and Bosnian towns along with Serbian troops, aggressive acts aimed at acquiring more territories by force, characterized by a consistent pattern of gross and systematic violations of human rights. Montenegrin General Pavle Strugar has since been convicted for his part in the bombing of Dubrovnik. Bosnian refugees were arrested by Montenegrin police and transported to Serb camps in Foča, where they were subjected to systematic torture and executed.

In May 1992, the United Nations imposed an embargo on FRY. This affected many aspects of life in the country.

Due to its favourable geographical location (access to the Adriatic Sea and a water-link to Albania across Lake Skadar) Montenegro became a hub for smuggling activity. The entire Montenegrin industrial production had stopped, and the republic's main economic activity became the smuggling of user goods – especially those in short supply like petrol and cigarettes, both of which skyrocketed in price. It became a de facto legalized practice and it went on for years. At best, the Montenegrin government turned a blind eye to the illegal activity, but mostly it took an active part in it. Smuggling made millionaires out of all sorts of shady individuals, including senior government officials. Milo Đukanović continues to face actions in various Italian courts over his role in widespread smuggling during the 1990s and in providing safe haven in Montenegro for different Italian Mafia figures who also allegedly took part in the smuggling distribution chain.

=== Recent history (1996–present) ===
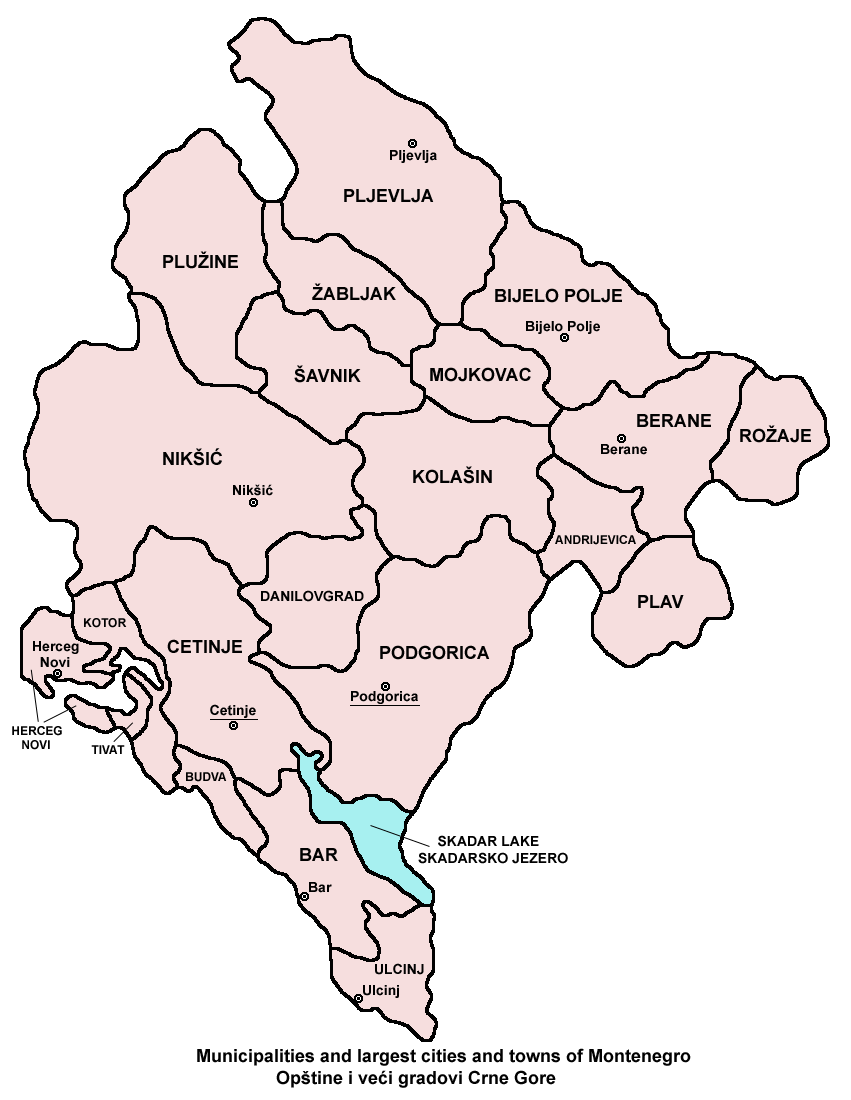
Map of modern Montenegro.

In 1997 a bitter dispute over presidential election results took place. It ended with Milo Đukanović winning over Momir Bulatović in a second-round run-off plagued with irregularities. Nonetheless, the authorities allowed the results to stand. Former close allies had by this time become bitter foes, which resulted in a near-warlike atmosphere in Montenegro for months during the autumn of 1997. It also split the Democratic Party of Socialists of Montenegro. Bulatović and his followers broke away to form the Socialist People's Party of Montenegro (SNP), staying loyal to Milošević, whereas Đukanović began to distance himself from Serbia. This distance from the policies of Milošević played a role in sparing Montenegro from the heavy bombing that Serbia endured in the spring of 1999 during the NATO air-campaign.

Đukanović came out a clear winner from this political fight, as he never lost power for even a day. Bulatović, on the other hand, never held office again in Montenegro after 1997 and eventually retired from politics in 2001.

During the Kosovo War, ethnic Albanians took refuge in Montenegro, but were still under threat by Serbian soldiers, who were able to take refugees back into Serbian controlled areas and imprison them.

In the spring of 1999, at the height of the NATO offensives, 21 Albanians died in several separate and unexplained incidents in Montenegro, according to the republic's prosecutor. Another group of around 60 Albanian refugees was fired upon in Kaludjerski Laz by Yugoslav Army members, leading to the death of six people, including a woman aged 80 and a child, killed in crossfire that allegedly came from three machine-gun posts of the then Yugoslav Army. In all, 23 Albanians were killed in Kaludjerski Laz, and Montenegrin prosecutors have charged 8 soldiers, among which is Predrag Strugar, son of convicted Montenegrin war criminal General Pavle Strugar, with "inhuman treatment against civilians". During the war Montenegro was bombed as part of NATO operations against Yugoslavia, though not as heavily as Serbia. The targets were mostly military ones such as Golubovci Airbase.

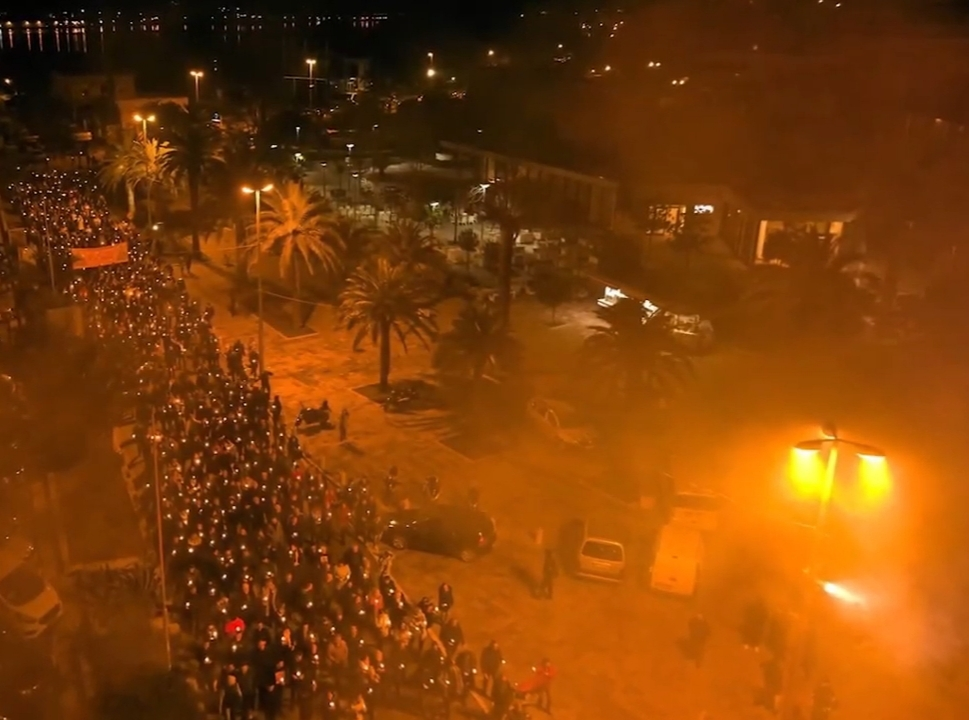
The "Law on Freedom of Religion or Belief and the Legal Status of Religious Communities" introduced in 2019 by the then-ruling DPS, would have seen the transfer of the majority of religious objects and land owned by the SPC to the Montenegrin state. It sparked a series of mass protests.

In 2003, after years of wrangling and outside assistance, the Federal Republic of Yugoslavia renamed itself as "Serbia and Montenegro" and officially reconstituted itself as a loose union. The State Union had a parliament and an army in common, and for three years (until 2006), neither Serbia nor Montenegro held a referendum on the break-up of the union. However, a referendum was announced in Montenegro to decide the future of the republic. The ballots cast in the controversial 2006 independence referendum resulted in a 55.5% victory for independence supporters, just above the 55% borderline mark set by the EU. Montenegro declared independence on 3 June 2006.

==== Independent Montenegro ====
On 28 June 2006, Montenegro joined the United Nations as its 192nd member state.

For 16 October 2016, the day of the parliamentary election, a coup d'état against the government of Milo Đukanović had been prepared, according to the Montenegrin Special Prosecutor. Fourteen people, including two Russian nationals and two Montenegrin opposition leaders, Andrija Mandić and Milan Knežević, were indicted for their alleged roles in the coup attempt on charges such as "preparing a conspiracy against the constitutional order and the security of Montenegro" and an "attempted terrorist act."

In June 2017, Montenegro formally became a member of NATO, an eventuality that had been rejected by about half of the country's population and had triggered a promise of retaliatory actions on the part of Russia's government.

In April 2018, Đukanović, the leader of the ruling Democratic Party of Socialists (DPS), won Montenegro’s presidential election. The veteran politician had served as Prime Minister six times and as President once before. He had dominated Montenegrin politics since 1991.

In September 2020, Đukanović's pro-Western Democratic Party of Socialists (DPS) narrowly lost the parliamentary election after having led the country for 30 years. The opposition, For the Future of Montenegro (ZBCG) bloc, was composed mainly of Serb nationalist parties. The new pro-serbian government was formed by Prime Minister Zdravko Krivokapić. However, Prime Minister Zdravko Krivokapic's government was toppled in no-confidence vote after only 14 months in power. In April 2022, a new minority government, comprising moderate parties that are both pro-European and pro-Serb, was formed. The new government was led by Prime Minister Dritan Abazovic.

On 12 August 2022, a mass shooting occurred in Cetinje, which left ten people dead and six others injured. The gunman, identified as 34-year-old Vučko Borilović, was then shot and killed by an armed civilian after engaging in a gun battle with responding officers. It is the deadliest mass shooting in the history of Montenegro.

In March 2023, Jakov Milatović, a pro-western candidate of the Europe Now movement, won the presidential election run-off over incumbent Milo Đukanović to succeed him as the next President of Montenegro. On 20 May 2023, Milatović was sworn in as President of Montenegro. In June 2023, Europe Now movement won a snap parliamentary election. On 31 October 2023, Milojko Spajic of the Europe Now Movement became Montenegro's new prime minister, leading a coalition of both pro-European and pro-Serb parties.

== See also ==
- Demographic history of Montenegro
- Military history of Montenegro
- Tribes of Montenegro
