= 2020 Montenegrin municipal elections =

2020 Montenegrin local elections
- 30 August 2020 (5 municipalities)
- 157 seats in local parliaments
Party	Leader	Vote %	Seats	+/–
DPS	Milo Đukanović	36.94	58	−20
DOCG	Radosav Rakonjac	28.66	45	+13
MNN	Aleksa Bečić	14.01	22	+10
SD	Ivan Brajović	8.91	14	+1
AK	Fatmir Gjeka	3.82	6	+1
SDP	Draginja Vuksanović	3.18	5	−5
BS	Rafet Husović	1.91	3	+2
CnB	Dritan Abazović	1.91	3	+1
This lists parties that won seats. See the complete results below.
Mayoral seats before	Mayoral seats after
DPS (5) (Note: At the 2016 local elections in Budva and Kotor, the opposition originally won a majority, but during 2019 and 2020, the ruling DPS regained power in both municipalities, after a couple of councilors changed sides and formed a majority with DPS, which many saw as an act of political corruption of ruling party. In both cases, DPS return to power was accompanied by arrests, police brutality and violence against removed local government officials and its supporters.)	DS (1); Democrats (1); SNP (1); DPS (1); Independent (1)

Municipal elections were held in Montenegro on 30 August 2020 in Andrijevica, Budva, Gusinje, Kotor and Tivat.

Elections for the Tivat local parliament were scheduled for 24 April, but were postponed to August, due to the COVID-19 pandemic in Montenegro, so that elections in all five municipalities were held on 30 August, the same date as the national-level parliamentary elections.

Since parliamentary election resulted in a victory for the opposition parties and the fall from power of the ruling DPS, which had ruled the country since the introduction of the multi-party system in 1990. Opposition success at the national level was accompanied by its success at local level elections, opposition lists won majority in four out of five municipalities where elections were held, including Andrijevica, Budva, Kotor and Tivat while in Gusinje, the ruling DPS retained power, in coalition with SD and the national minority parties.

== Results ==
=== Andrijevica ===
Party / Coalition	Popular vote	% of votes	Seats	±	Gov't
DPS–SD	1,626	49.02	15	▼6	No
NSD–SNP–DS–GSS–SDU	1,381	41.63	13	▲3	Yes
DCG–Demos	310	9.35	3	▲3	Yes

=== Budva ===
Party / Coalition	Popular vote	% of votes	Seats	±	Gov't
DS–GSS–SDU–DF–SNP–PCG–UCG–Demos	5,786	41.40	14	▲5	Yes
DPS–CGP–SD–LP	4,340	31.06	11	▼5	No
DCG	2,479	17.74	6	▼1	Yes
URA	532	3.81	1	0	No
SDP	429	3.07	1	▲1	No
Others	409	2.92	0	New	—N/a

=== Gusinje ===
Party / Coalition	Popular vote	% of vote	Seats	±	Gov't
DPS	776	36.24	12 (Note: The "Party for Gusinje", which won 6 seats at the 2016 local elections in Gusinje, merged into Democratic Party of Socialists in 2019.)	▼3	No
SD	499	23.31	7	▲3	supp.
AA−DSA−DUA	469	21.91	6	0	Yes
BS–LP	242	11.30	3	▲2	Yes
SDP	80	3.74	1	▼2	Yes
SNP	75	3.50	1	0	Yes

=== Kotor ===
Party / Coalition	Popular vote	% of vote	Seats	±	Gov't
Democratic Party of Socialists	4,437	32.14	12	0	No
Kotor is Our Nation	3,313	24.00	9	▲4	Yes
For the Future of Kotor	2,937	21.27	7	▼1	Yes
United Reform Action	692	5.01	1	0	Supp.
Social Democratic Party	603	4.37	1	▼2	No
Social Democrats	568	4.11	1	▼1	No
Liberal Party	566	4.10	1	0	No
Socialists of Montenegro	450	3.26	1	New	No
Croatian Civic Initiative	239	1.73	0	▼1	—N/a

=== Tivat ===
Party / Coalition	Popular vote	% of vote	Seats	±	Gov't
People Wins (Note: Members of local DF, SNP and DCG, as well of some Tivat localist parties, such as the Tivat Action and Arsenal for Tivat, which decided to run independently, due to opposition boycott of 2020 Tivat local elections.)	3,519	38.25	13	▲10	Yes
Democratic Party of Socialists	3,014	32.76	11	▼6	No
Social Democrats	701	7.62	2	▼2	No
Boka Forum	612	6.65	2	▲1	Yes
Croatian Civic Initiative	520	5.65	2	Steady	No
Social Democratic Party	379	4.12	1	▼1	Supp.
Goran Božović List	311	3.38	1	New	Yes
