= Opposition (Montenegro) =

Parliamentary political opposition to the government of Montenegro

Leader of the Opposition Lider opozicije / Лидер опозиције
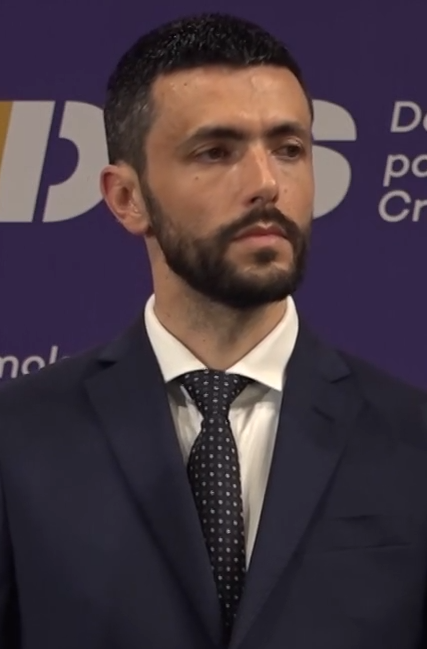
- Danijel Živković since 31 October 2023
- Term length: While leader of the largest party not in government

In Montenegro, the Opposition (Montenegrin: Opozicija / Oпoзициja) is all of the political parties represented in Parliament that are not a part of the Government supported by the parliamentary majority.

The Leader of the Opposition (Montenegrin: Lider opozicije / Лидер опозиције) leads the largest party not within the government.

== 11th assembly of the Parliament ==
The main opposition subject in the eleventh assembly of Parliament of Montenegro are the Democratic Party of Socialists (DPS) of Milo Đukanović, which fall from the power, after ruled the country for 30 years, since the introduction of multi-party system in 1990. The August 2020 parliamentary election resulted in the victory of the lists of parties which were in opposition in the previous parliament convocation; For the Future of Montenegro (DF-SNP-NP), Peace is Our Nation (DCG-Demos), United Reform Action (URA) and the Social Democratic Party (SDP), opposition lists won 43 of the 81 seats in the Parliament of Montenegro, while the ruling DPS, together with the Liberal Party, won only 30 seats, going into opposition after thirty years in power. Three opposition lists For the Future of Montenegro, Peace is Our Nation and United Reform Action, which won a majority of 41 MPs, announced the formation of a coalition government, while the SDP remained in opposition. In the 11th assembly of the Parliament (2020–present), the subjects in parliament that include the opposition are:

- Democratic Party of Socialists (DPS)
- Social Democrats (SD)
- Bosniak Party (BS)
- Social Democratic Party (SDP)
- Albanian Alternative (ASh/AA)
- Democratic Party (PD/DP)
- Liberal Party of Montenegro (LP)

== 10th assembly of the Parliament ==
Since the constitution the 10th assembly of the Montenegrin Parliament the entire opposition (all 39 MPs out of 81 in total) started a collective boycott of all parliamentary sittings, due to claims of electoral fraud at the October 2016 parliamentary elections. The largest opposition group, Democratic Front alliance, decides to end the boycott and return to parliament in December 2017, as did newly formed, United Montenegro. The Social Democratic Party and the Demos both decides to end the boycott and return to parliament, after poor results in May 2018 local elections, as did Socialist People's Party. Leaving Democratic Montenegro and United Reform Action, who remaining in a boycott with the same demands. In the 10th assembly of the Parliament of Montenegro (2016–2020), the subjects in parliament that include the opposition are:

- Democratic Montenegro (DCG)
- New Serb Democracy (NSD)
- Movement for Changes (PzP)
- Socialist People's Party (SNP)
- Social Democratic Party (SDP)
- Democratic Alliance (Demos)
- United Montenegro (split from Demos in 2017)
- Democratic People's Party (DNP)
- United Reform Action (URA)
- Workers' Party (RP)

== 9th assembly of the Parliament ==
Since the constitution of the 9th assembly of the Montenegrin Parliament, the opposition subjects in the parliament were Democratic Front (DF), Socialist People's Party (SNP) and Positive Montenegro (PCG). The leader of the opposition was Miodrag Lekić, leader of the DF. After Lekić's abandonment of Democratic Front in March 2015, Andrija Mandić became de facto leader of opposition. In January 2016, despite formerly being an opposition party, PCG provided the ruling DPS with 3 votes necessary to win the government confidence vote, after the DPS's coalition partner the SDP left the government coalition due to allegations of electoral fraud and political corruption, leaving the government functioning as a de facto minority government. Provisional government was elected on May 12, 2016, by the Parliament. The provisional governing coalition was formed by ruling DPS and several opposition parties. The subjects in the Parliament that include the opposition were:

- Democratic Front (DF)
- DEMOS (split from DF in 2015)
- Socialist People's Party (SNP)
- Democrats (split from SNP in 2015)
- Positive Montenegro (PCG, until 2016)
- United Reform Action (split from PCG in 2015)
- Social Democratic Party (SDP, since 2015)
- Albanian Alternative (AA, since 2015)

== Leaders of the Opposition (2006–) ==
Image	Leader (Birth–Death)	Opposition subject	Term of office		Assembly convocation	Government Cabinet
	Nebojša Medojević (1966–)	PzP	10 September 2006	29 March 2009	VII. (7th)	Šturanović
	Nebojša Medojević (1966–)	PzP	10 September 2006	29 March 2009	VII. (7th)	Đukanović (V)
	Srđan Milić (1965–)	SNP	29 March 2009	14 October 2012	VIII. (8th)	Đukanović (V)
	Srđan Milić (1965–)	SNP	29 March 2009	14 October 2012	VIII. (8th)	Lukšić
	Miodrag Lekić (1947–)	DF	14 October 2012	13 March 2015	IX. (9th)	Đukanović (VI)
	Andrija Mandić (1965–)	NSD (DF)	13 March 2015	31 August 2020	IX. (9th)	Đukanović (VI)
	Andrija Mandić (1965–)	NSD (DF)	13 March 2015	31 August 2020	X. (10th)	Marković
	Aleksa Bečić (1987–)	DCG	16 October 2016	31 August 2020	X. (10th)	Marković
	Milo Đukanović (1962–)	DPS	31 August 2020	28 April 2022	XI. (11th)	Krivokapić
	Andrija Mandić (1965–)	NSD (DF)	28 April 2022	31 October 2023		Krivokapić
	Andrija Mandić (1965–)	NSD (DF)	28 April 2022	31 October 2023	XI. (11th)	Abazović
	Aleksa Bečić (1987–)	DCG	28 April 2022	31 October 2023	XI. (11th)	Abazović
	Danijel Živković (1987–)	DPS	31 October 2023	-	XII. (12th)	Spajić

== See also ==
- Political opposition
- Politics of Montenegro
