= 2016 Montenegrin municipal elections =

2016 Montenegrin local elections
- 7 April (Tivat); 16 October (4 municipalities)
- 157 seats in local parliaments
Party	Leader	Vote %	Seats	+/–
DPS	Milo Đukanović	43.94	69	−1
DF	Andrija Mandić	10.19	16	−3
SNP	Srđan Milić	9.55	16	+1
SD	Ivan Brajović	8.28	13	New
DCG	Aleksa Bečić	7.64	12	New
SDP	Ranko Krivokapić	6.36	10	−7
PzG	Rusmin Laličić	3.82	6	+2
HGI	Marija Vučinović	1.91	3	−2
AO	Nazif Cungu	1.91	3	−1
AK	Gëzim Hajdinaga	1.91	3	−1
CDU	Miodrag Vlahović	1.91	3	New
This lists parties that won seats. See the complete results below.
Mayoral seats before	Mayoral seats after
DPS (5)	DPS (3); DCG (2)

Municipal elections were held in Montenegro on 17 April in Tivat and on 16 October in Andrijevica, Budva, Gusinje and Kotor.

== Results ==
=== April elections ===
==== Tivat ====
Party	Votes	%	Seats
Democratic Party of Socialists	3,374	44.74%	17
Social Democrats	787	10.43%	4
Social Democratic Party	563	7.46%	2
Tivat Action	544	7.21%	2
Socialist People's Party	471	6.25%	2
Croatian Civic Initiative	394	5.22%	2
Democratic Serb Party	365	4.84%	1
Boka Forum	327	4.34%	1
Arsenal for Tivat	320	4.24%	1
Montenegrin Democratic Union	182	2.41%	-
Serbian Radical Party	139	1.84%	-
Tivat Liberals	76	1.01%	-

This election was boycotted by several opposition parties and coalitions due to unfair conditions.

Elected mayor: Snežana Matijević (DPS)

=== October elections ===
==== Budva ====
Party	Votes	%	Seats
Democratic Party of Socialists	3,883	33.45%	12
Democrats	2,263	19.49%	7
Democratic Front	2,231	19.22%	7
Montenegrin Democratic Union	931	8.02%	3
Coalition SNP-DEMOS	773	6.60%	2
Coalition SDP-URA-LP	603	5.19%	1
Social Democrats	456	3.92%	1
Civic Action	205	1.76%	-
Positive Montenegro	134	1.15%	-
Independent list "Uplift Budva"	128	1.10%	-

Elected mayor: Dragan Krapović (Democrats)

==== Kotor ====
Party	Votes	%	Seats
Democratic Party of Socialists	4,014	32.71%	12
Democrats	1,801	14.68%	5
Democratic Front	1,660	13.53%	5
Socialist People's Party	996	8.12%	3
Social Democratic Party	977	7.96%	3
Social Democrats	697	5.68%	2
Liberal Party	535	4.36%	1
United Reform Action	415	3.38%	1
Croatian Civic Initiative	382	3.10%	1
Party of Serb Radicals	353	2.88%	-
Demos	264	2.15%	-
Positive Montenegro	177	1.44%	-

Elected mayor: Vladimir Jokić (Democrats)

==== Andrijevica ====
Party	Votes	%	Seats
Democratic Party of Socialists	1,865	57.07%	20
Democratic Front	544	16.65%	5
Socialist People's Party	518	15.85%	5
Social Democrats	137	4.19%	1
Social Democratic Party	81	2.23%	-
Demos	81	2.23%	-
Positive Montenegro	42	1.28%	-

Elected mayor: Srđan Mašović (DPS)

==== Gusinje ====
Party	Votes	%	Seats
Democratic Party of Socialists	?	26.8%	9
Party for Gusinje	?	18.4%	6
Social Democrats	?	13.7%	4
Democratic League	?	11.5%	3
Social Democratic Party	?	10.1%	3
Coalition DUA-AA	?	8.9%	3
Bosniak Party	?	5.2%	1
Socialist People's Party	?	4.6%	1

Elected mayor: Anela Čekić (DPS)
