= 2018 Podgorica City Assembly election =

Local elecion in Montenegro

- 27 May 2018
- All 61 seats in the City Assembly; 31 seats needed for a majority
- Turnout: 64.2%
Party	Leader	Vote %	Seats	+/–
DPS-led coalition	Milo Đukanović	47.6	32	+1
DCG–URA	Aleksa Bečić	25.7	17	New
DF–SNP	Andrija Mandić	12.3	8	−17
Social Democrats	Ivan Brajović	5.1	3	New
AA^{[min.]}	Nik Gjeloshaj	1.8	1	+1
This lists parties that won seats. See the complete results below.
Mayor before	Mayor after
Migo Stijepović; DPS	Ivan Vuković; DPS

City Assembly elections were held in Podgorica, the capital of Montenegro, on 27 May 2018. Parties and coalitions ran for 61 seats in the Assembly, with 3% election threshold required to win seats.

== Electoral system ==
Voters in Podgorica determine the composition of the City Assembly, which in turn elects the Mayor. This means that the Mayor is only indirectly elected by the voters. Only parties which reach an electoral threshold of 3% may enter the Assembly. The Mayor may or may not be a councilor of the Assembly. Assembly's composition is subject to a 4-year election cycle.

== Electoral lists ==
The following are the electoral lists proclaimed by the Capital City Electoral Commission:

No.	Ballot Name
1	For the sake of citizens of Podgorica. Winning Coalition – Milo Đukanović
2	Citizen Group – Saša Mijović
3	Civic Alliance for Changes (SDP – DEMOS – Free Citizens)
4	United Montenegro – Goran Danilović – Serious People for a Serious City
5	Democratic Front – Socialist People's Party – Everything for my City
6	Albanian Alternative^{[minority party]}
7	Social Democrats – Ivan Brajović – Consistently for Podgorica
8	Marko Milačić – For Podgorica to be a Family – True Montenegro
9	Aleksa Bečić - Dritan Abazović – Podgorica for the 21st Century – Democrats – URA
10	Serb Coalition – Dobrilo Dedeić

== Campaign ==
Democratic Montenegro (DCG) and United Reform Action (URA) decided to run together under the name the "Podgorica for 21st century", with DCG member Vladimir Čađenović as ballot carrier.

Social Democratic Party (SDP) decided to form a pre-election alliance with Democratic Alliance (DEMOS) under the name the "Civic Alliance for Changes", with SDP member Ivan Vujović as ballot carrier.

Bosniak Party (BS) decided to sign an agreement with ruling Democratic Party of Socialists (DPS) and Liberal Party (LP), as did the Montenegrin (CRN), Positive Montenegro (PCG) and Democratic Union of Albanians (DUA), with university professor Ivan Vuković as ballot carrier, while the current Mayor Migo Stijepović took second place on electoral list.

Social Democrats (SD) decided to run independently under the slogan "Consistently for Podgorica", with current president of Podgorica City Assembly Đorđe Suhih as ballot carrier.

Socialist People's Party (SNP) and Democratic Front (DF) agreed to form a pre-election local alliance under the slogan "Everything for my City", with DF member and MP Slaven Radunović as ballot carrier.

== Results ==
Party	Votes	%	Seats
Democratic Party of Socialists coalition	48,043	47.6%	32
Democratic Montenegro-United Reform Action	26,032	25.7%	17
Democratic Front-Socialist People's Party	12,291	12.3%	8
Social Democrats	5,122	5.1%	3
Social Democratic Party-Demos	2,985	2.9%	-
True Montenegro	2,399	2.3%	-
Albanian Alternative^{[minority party]}	1,478	1.8%	1
United Montenegro	1,409	1.4%	-
Citizen Group – Saša Mijović	746	0.7%	-
Serb Coalition	199	0.3%	-

=== Vote share ===
DPS coalition	47.6%
DCG-URA	25.7%
DF-SNP	12.3%
SD	5.1%
SDP-Demos	2.9%
PCG	2.3%
AA	1.8%
UCG	1.4%
Others	1.0%

=== Seats ===
DPS coalition (32)	52.4%
DCG-URA (17)	27.8%
DF-SNP (8)	13.1%
SD (3)	4.9%
AA (1)	1.6%
