= 2021 Montenegrin municipal elections =

2021 Montenegrin local elections
- 14 March-9 May (Nikšić and H. Novi); 5 December (3 municipalities)
- 170 seats in local parliaments
Party	Leader	Vote %	Seats	+/–
DPS-SD (Note: Include other minor coalition partners, such as LP and PKS. SD run separately in Cetinje and Petnjica.)	Milo Đukanović	43.52	72	−43
MNN (Note: Including 4 seats won by the NDCG members in Nikšić, Herceg Novi and Mojkovac. The NDCG run as an independent list at the Mojkovac election.)	Aleksa Bečić	18.82	32	+11
DF-SNP (Note: Include various other minor coalition partners, such as SRS, SCG and JKP. SNP run independently at the elections in Cetinje and Petnjica, winning one seat.)	Andrija Mandić	15.88	28	+16
CnB (Note: Including 3 seats won by the Bosniak ethnic minority SPP at the Petnjica local election.)	Dritan Abazović	7.05	12	+5
SDP	Raško Konjević	5.29	9	+4
NL (Note: Independent local list run only in Herceg Novi.)	Savo Marić	4.11	7	+4
BS	Ervin Ibrahimović	3.52	6	+1
SG LSCG (Note: Independent local list run only in Cetinje.)	Goran Vušurović	1.76	3	+1
This lists parties that won seats. See the complete results below.
Mayoral seats before	Mayoral seats after
DPS/SD (4); MNN (1)	DF/SNP (2); MNN (1); SDP (1); DPS/SD (1)

Local elections were held on 14 March 2021 in Nikšić Municipality, on 9 May 2021 in Herceg Novi Municipality, while the elections in the municipalities of Cetinje, Mojkovac and Petnjica were held on 5 December 2021.

Elections resulted in won for local-level opposition parties in 3 out of 5 municipalities. Large coalition consisting of the former ZBCG (led by DF), MNN (led by DCG) and CnB (led by URA) formed local government in Nikšić and Mojkovac municipalities, while SDP and the independent list "Old Guard of the LSCG" rise in Cetinje Old Royal Capital. The DPS keep governing in Petnjica, in coalition with SD and BS, while the DCG keep its mayoral post in Herceg Novi, in coalition with the local DF and URA. Novska Lista is a local pro-Serb Herceg Novi based political party that started from few former NSD and SNP members who left in 2012, few months after creation of DF.

== Results ==
=== March elections ===
==== Nikšić ====
Party / Coalition	Popular vote	% of vote	Seats	±	Gov't
DPS–SD–LP–PKS (Note: Previous local election in Nikšić was held on 12 March 2017 and was boycotted by all the opposition parties after the Government announced the imprisonment of the leaders of the opposition Democratic Front alliance. Only the ruling DPS (winning 80% of votes) and its minor partner SD (9% of votes) ran in the election, with voter turnout at 45%, while 11% of the votes cast were spoilt.)	19,294	40.4%	18	▼23	No
DF–SNP	12,348	25.9%	11	▲11	Yes
DCG–Demos	11,150	23.2%	10	▲10	Yes
URA	2,140	4.5%	1	▲1	Yes
NP	1,549	3.2%	1	New	No
SDP	1,259	2.7%	0	0	—N/a

=== May elections ===
==== Herceg Novi ====
Party / Coalition	Popular vote	% of votes	Seats	±	Gov't
DCG–Demos	4,568	27.29%	10	▲1	Yes
DPS–SD	3,680	21.99%	8	▼5	No
DF–SNP	3,246	19.39%	7	▲1	Yes
"Novska lista"	3,195	19.09%	7	▲3	Yes
URA–CIVIS	1,281	7.65%	2	▲2 (Note: At the previous local election in Herceg Novi, United Reform Action participated in a coalition with the Social Democratic Party and together they won one seat, that seat being won by a member of SDP, effectively making URA an extra-parliamentary party on the local level in Herceg Novi.)	Yes
PCG	768	4.59%	1	New	Yes

=== December elections ===
==== Cetinje ====
Party / Coalition	Popular vote	% of vote	Seats	±	Gov't
DPS	3,669	40.5%	14	▼2	No
SDP	2,031	22.4%	8	▲5	Yes
URA	996	11.0%	4	▼1	Supp.
DCG	878	9.7%	3	▼2	Supp.
Old Guard	827	9.1%	3	▲1	Yes
SD–LP	389	4.3%	1	▼1	No
SNP	135	1.4%	0	0	—N/a
Dragan Hajduković list	123	1.3%	0	New	—N/a

==== Mojkovac ====
Party / Coalition	Popular vote	% of votes	Seats	±	Gov't
DPS–SD–LP	2,395	43.9%	14	▼5	No
DF–SNP	1,320	24.2%	8	▲2	Yes
DCG	735	13.4%	4	▼1	Yes
NDM	348	6.4%	2	New	Yes
URA	334	6.1%	2	▲1	Supp.
UCG	328	6.0%	1	New	Supp.

==== Petnjica ====
Party / Coalition	Popular vote	% of vote	Seats	±	Gov't
DPS	1,390	48.7%	16	▼4	Yes
BS	519	18.2%	6	▲1	Yes
SPP	334	11.7%	3	▲2	No
DCG	203	7.1%	2	▲1	No
SD	202	7.1%	2	▼1	Yes
SDP	115	4.0%	1	0	No
SNP	89	3.1%	1	▲1	No

== List of mayors and local governments ==
Municipality	Mayor before elections	Party	Current Mayor	Party	Local government
Nikšić	Veselin Grbović	DPS	Marko Kovačević	DF	DF-SNP-DCG-URA
Herceg Novi	Stevan Katić	DCG	Stevan Katić	DCG	DCG-DF-SNP-NL-URA-PCG
Cetinje	Aleksandar Kašćelan	DPS	Nikola Đurašković	SDP	SDP-SG LSCG-URA-DCG
Mojkovac	Ranko Mišnić	DPS	Vesko Delić	DF	DF-DCG-SNP-URA
Petnjica	Samir Agović	DPS	Erol Muratović	DPS	DPS-SD-BS
