= New Left (Montenegro) =

New Left Нова љевица Nova ljevica
- Leader: Saša Mijović
- Founded: 8 December 2018
- Headquarters: Podgorica, Montenegro
- Ideology: Social liberalism Pro-Europeanism
- Political position: Centre-left
- Parliament of Montenegro: 0 / 81

Website
- novaljevica.me

The New Left (Montenegrin: Нова љевица, romanized: Nova ljevica, NL) is a minor localist, socially liberal and nationalist political party in Montenegro formed as a local citizens' movement in May 2018 prior to the 2018 Podgorica City Assembly election by Saša Mijović, Montenegrin drug abuse interventionist, NGO activist and the former member of the Young Liberals of Montenegro, youth-branch of the minor DPS-affiliated Montenegrin nationalist Liberal Party of Montenegro.

== History ==
The New Left party was formed in December 2018 from the Podgorica local citizens' movement gathered around civic activist Saša Mijović. It was part of the 2019 Montenegrin anti-corruption protests. In July 2020, the New Left decided to enter the pro-European, big tent Peace is Our Nation coalition with the Democrats, Demos, and Party of United Pensioners and the Disabled in order to participate at the 2020 Montenegrin parliamentary election.

The party left the coalition with the centrist Democrats in early September 2021, during the Montenegrin nationalist protests in Cetinje led by the former DPS-led regime and minor nationalist right-wing organizations, publicly supporting violent protests against the enthronement of the new head of the Metropolitanate of Montenegro and the Littoral, expressing public support for the canonically unrecognized Montenegrin Orthodox Church and its controversial leader Miraš Dedeić, accusing their former coalition partners of "betraying Montenegrin national interests" for cooperating with the "occupying church in Montenegro", what they called canonical Metropolitanate of Montenegro of the SOC. Mijović and his party launched a negative campaign under the slogan "no more ethnic Montenegrin votes for Democrats and the URA!", also calling on the centre-left URA to “overthrow” the government “like men”, increasingly publishing statements predominantly characterized by ethnic nationalism and negative sentiment towards the local Serb population in Montenegro.

== Electoral performance ==
=== Parliamentary election ===
Year	Popular vote	% of popular vote	Overall seats won	Seat change	Coalition	Government
2020	51,298	12.53%	0 / 81	New	MNN	Extra-parliamentary
