= 2020 Montenegrin parliamentary election =

Parliamentary election held in Montenegro

← 2016	30 August 2020	2023 →
- All 81 seats in the Parliament; 41 seats needed for a majority
- Turnout: 76.64% (▲3.23pp)
Party	Leader	Vote %	Seats	+/–
DPS	Milo Đukanović	35.06	30	−6
ZBCG	Zdravko Krivokapić	32.55	27	+6
MjNN	Aleksa Bečić	12.53	10	−2
CnB	Dritan Abazović	5.54	4	+2
SD	Ivan Brajović	4.09	3	+1
BS	Rafet Husović	3.98	3	+1
SDP	Draginja Vuksanović	3.14	2	−2
LSh	Nik Gjeloshaj	1.58	1	0
KSH	Fatmir Gjeka	1.14	1	+1
This lists parties that won seats. See the complete results below.
Results by each municipality;
DPS ZBCG BS AL
Saturation of colour denotes strength of vote
Prime Minister before	Prime Minister after
Duško Marković; DPS	Zdravko Krivokapić; Independent

Parliamentary elections were held in Montenegro on 30 August 2020. They were the fifth parliamentary in Montenegro since gaining its independence in 2006. Eighty-one members of the Montenegrin parliament were elected. Elections were organized in special conditions, due to the COVID-19 pandemic in Montenegro. The parliamentary election was also held simultaneously with the local elections in five municipalities.

The period before the election was marked by the high polarization of the electorate. Several corruption scandals of the ruling party triggered 2019 anti-government protests, while a controversial religion law sparked another wave of protests. Election observers Organization for Security and Co-operation in Europe stated: "Abuse of state resources gave the ruling party an unfair advantage", and said that although the elections were competitive, the governing party also benefited from a lack of independent media.

The election resulted in a victory for the opposition parties and the fall from power of the ruling DPS, which had ruled the country since the introduction of the multi-party system in 1990. On 31 August, the leaders of three opposition coalitions, For the Future of Montenegro, Peace is Our Nation and In Black and White, agreed to form an expert government, and to continue to work on the European Union accession process.

== Background ==
Following the 2016 parliamentary elections, the entire opposition started a collective boycott of all parliamentary sittings. In January 2017, 39 of the 81 MPs were boycotting parliament, requesting early elections to be held no later than 2018, when the next presidential elections were scheduled.

In 2016, then Vice President of the ruling DPS Svetozar Marović was arrested in connection to a long-running corruption case concerning his hometown of Budva; the Montenegrin prosecutor's office labeled him as "head of Budva criminal group," which he later admitted in court. He eventually fled to neighboring Serbia for alleged psychiatric treatment in Belgrade, where he currently resides. Montenegro has repeatedly requested his extradition from Serbia. In August 2020, Marović spoke to the media for the first time, after fleeing to Belgrade, accusing the leadership of the party he founded of corruption, nepotism, partocracy and authoritarianism, also accusing President Đukanović of rigging the corruption process against him and members of his family.

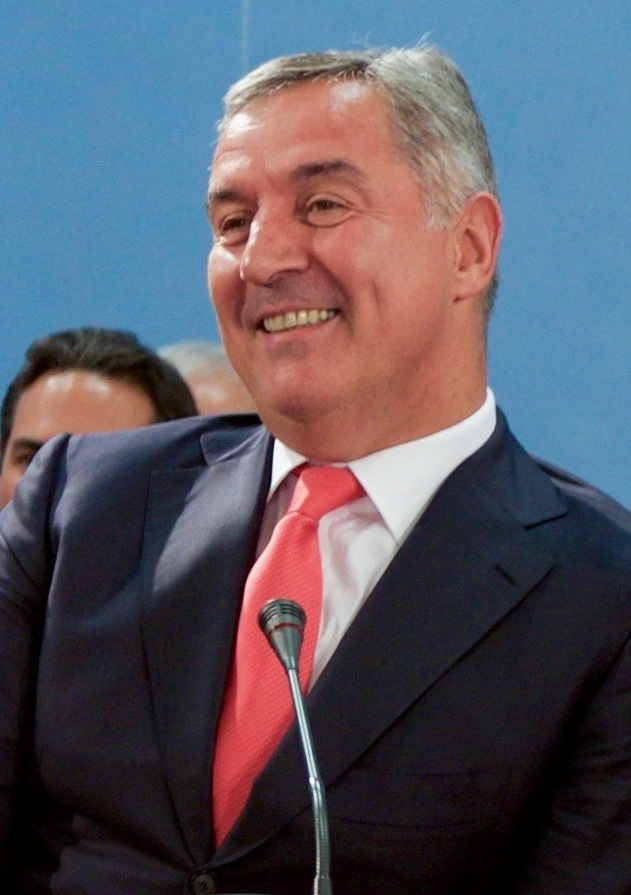
President Milo Đukanović, whose DPS ruled the country for three decades, established a hybrid regime through alleged strongman tactics

In its June 2018 report, issued after the April 2018 presidential election, the OSCE's Office for Democratic Institutions and Human Rights, called for election reforms in Montenegro, and for more integrity, impartiality, and professionalism in election administration.

Protests against corruption in the DPS-led government started in February 2019 after the revelation of footage and documents that appeared to implicate top officials in obtaining funds for the ruling party. On 30 March, all 39 opposition MPs signed an "Agreement for the Future", proposed by the protest organizers, in which they promised to boycott the 2020 elections if they were deemed irregular. In May 2020 the protest organizers called for a boycott of the 30 August elections, along with some opposition parties, claiming that the elections would not be held under fair conditions.

The EU-backed board for electoral system reform, which both the government and the opposition participated in, failed in December 2019, after the opposition left the board sessions as a protest against the government passing a controversial law on religion, accusing the ruling party of inciting ethnic hatred and unrest. In late December 2019 another wave of protests started against the newly adopted law which de jure transfers the ownership of church buildings and estates from the Orthodox Church to the Montenegrin state.

In its political rights and civil liberties worldwide report in May 2020, Freedom House marked Montenegro as a hybrid regime rather than a democracy because of declining standards in governance, justice, elections, and media freedom. Freedom House stated that years of increasing state capture, abuse of power and strongman tactics had been employed by long-term Prime Minister and President Milo Đukanović, and for the first time since 2003, Montenegro was no longer categorised as a democracy. The report emphasised the unequal electoral process, cases of political arrests, negative developments related to judicial independence, media freedoms, as well as a series of unresolved cases of corruption within the DPS-led government. Despite repeated demands from the opposition, NGO sector, and the EU-backed institutions for the professionalization and neutralisation of institutions controlling the electoral process, they are still under the de facto control of the ruling Democratic Party of Socialists-led coalition government.

== Electoral system ==
The 81 seats of the Parliament of Montenegro are elected in a single nationwide constituency using closed list proportional representation. Seats are allocated using the d'Hondt method with a 3% electoral threshold; however, minority groups that account for no more than 15% of the population in a district are given an exemption that lowers the electoral threshold to 0.7% for a maximum of three seats. A separate exemption is given to ethnic Croats whereby if no list representing the population passes the 0.7% threshold, the list with the most votes will win one seat if it receives more than 0.35% of the vote.

== Campaign ==
On 1 May 2019, the Socialist People's Party (SNP), United Montenegro (UCG), Workers' Party (RP) and Independent group in the parliament agreed to form a new catch-all political alliance under the name For the Benefit of All. The alliance eventually dissolved prior the election. In August 2020, all three parties decided to join a pre-election coalition with right-wing Democratic Front (DF) alliance, under the name For the Future of Montenegro, as did some minor political parties, such as the True Montenegro (PCG), Democratic Party of Unity (DSJ), Democratic Serb Party (DSS) and Yugoslav Communist Party (JKP).

On 11 July 2020, the Civic Movement URA decided to run independently, presenting its centre-left "In Black and White" election platform, led by independent candidates, including well known journalist and activist Milka Tadić, some university professors, journalists, civic and NGO activists, with the party leader Dritan Abazović as a ballot carrier. URA electoral list also contains one representative of the Bosniak minority interests SPP party, as well of some minor localist parties and initiatives.

Democratic Montenegro, DEMOS, the New Left, PUPI and the NGO Policy Research Society, agreed to form a pre-election coalition under the name Peace is Our Nation, with Democratic Montenegro leader Aleksa Bečić as a ballot carrier.

On 12 July 2020, the opposition Social Democratic Party of Montenegro (SDP) announced that it would run independently, as did the Social Democrats of Montenegro (SD), junior party in the previous government coalition, a few days earlier.

On 28 July 2020, the Albanian List, a minority politics coalition was formed by New Democratic Force (Forca), the Albanian Alternative (AA), Albanian Coalition Perspective (AKP) and the Democratic League of Albanians (DSA), A few weeks earlier, Democratic Union of Albanians (DUA) agreed to join the DP and DSCG's Albanian Coalition "Unanimously".

Prior to August 2020, the centre-right minority politics Bosniak Party (BS) announced that it would run independently, as did the centre-right Croatian Civic Initiative (HGI) and the newly formed centrist Croatian Reform Party (HRS).

On 1 August 2020, the ruling Democratic Party of Socialists (DPS) decided to run independently, with Andrija Popović as Liberal Party (LP) representative on their electoral list, with incumbent prime-minister Duško Marković as a ballot carrier.

=== Electoral lists ===
#	Electoral list name	Ballot carrier	Political position	Note
1	Social Democrats – Ivan Brajović – We decide, consistently	Ivan Brajović	Centre-left, populism	
2	Bosniak Party – Correctly – Rafet Husović	Ervin Ibrahimović	Centre-right to right	^{M}
3	HGI – With all heart for Montenegro!	Adrian Vuksanović	Centre-right	^{M}
4	Social Democratic Party – Strong Montenegro!	Draginja Vuksanović	Centre-left	
5	Croatian Reform Party of Montenegro – HRS	Radovan Marić	Centre to centre-right	^{M}
6	Dritan Abazović – In Black and White – Srđan Pavićević	Dritan Abazović	Centre-left	
7	Albanian Coalition – Unanimously – DP, DUA, DSCG	Fatmir Gjeka	Centre-right to right	^{M}
8	Decisively for Montenegro! DPS – Milo Đukanović	Duško Marković	Big tent, populism	
9	For the Future of Montenegro – DF, SNP, Popular Movement	Zdravko Krivokapić	Centre-right to right	
10	Albanian List – Genci Nimanbegu, Nik Đeljošaj	Nik Gjeloshaj	Centre-right to right	^{M}
11	Aleksa Bečić – Miodrag Lekić – Peace is Our Nation	Aleksa Bečić	Big tent, centrism	
• Source: National Electoral Commission (official website). • Note: "M" denotes the national minority electoral list.

== Opinion polls ==
Poll results are listed in the table below in reverse chronological order, showing the most recent first, and using the date poll was published. The highest percentage figure in each polling survey is displayed in bold, and the background shaded in the leading party's colour. In the instance that there is a tie, then no figure is shaded. The lead column on the right shows the percentage-point difference between the two parties with the highest figures. The threshold for a party to provide their deputies in parliament is 3%, except for minority parties and coalitions (E.g. BS, Forca and AA), for which that threshold does not apply.

- ^{[a]} denotes the poll was commissioned by an election participating political party.
- ^{[b]} denotes the poll was commissioned by an embassy or a foreign institute.

Date	Polling firm/source	DPS	DF	PCG	SNP	UCG	URA	Demos	DCG	SDP	SD	BS	Forca	AA	Others	Lead
**Results**		35.06	**32.55**				**5.54**	**12.53**		**3.14**	**4.10**	**3.98**	**1.58**		**1.52**	**2.51**
Aug 2020	ICA	35.1	25.9				7.5	15.5		3.1	2.6	5.4	4.4		0.5	9.2
Aug 2020	CeDem	35.3	24.7				6.6	16.5		4.2	5.3	4.8	1.9		0.7	10.6
July 2020	NSPM	35.9	17.2	3.8	4.5	>1	6.1	3.5	17.5	3.4	1.8	3.2	1.3		1.8	18.4
July 2020	HoW^{[a]}	41.2	15.8		6.1		2.4	16.4		3.9	5.9	4.1	2.9		1.3	24.8
June 2020	HoW^{[a]}	39.8	13.8	2.1	5.1	0.8	2.2	2.9	13.2	3.8	6.2	4.2	3.3		2.6	26.0
May 2020	HoW^{[a]}	41.2	12.9	1.4	5.5	0.6	2.8	3.1	12.1	4.4	6.5	4.1	3.2		2.2	28.3
Apr 2020	HoW^{[a]}	40.5	12.5	1.8	5.2	0.9	2.7	2.7	13.5	4.1	6.1	4.2	3.1		2.7	26
Feb 2020	ICA	32.8	23.1	1.6	2.6	0.7	3.3	2.3	11.8	3.1	2.7	5.1	4.5		6.4	9.7
Dec 2019	CeDem	37	13.2	2.2	5.8	1.2	3.7	2.6	15	4.1	4.8	4.9	1	1.6	2.9	22
Oct 2019	NSPM^{[b]}	35.5	20.8	1.9	6.3		2.5	1.7	15.1	3.2	4.4	3.2	2.3		3.1	14.7
Sep 2019	Damar^{[a]}	38	15.3	4.3	4	0.7	2.7	2.5	14.8	2.8	4.3	4	2.6		4.0	22.7
Aug 2019	Ipsos	41	13	3	8		2	2.5	17	2	4	2	>1	2	3.5	24
July 2019	CeDem	34	15.6	2.3	6.6		4.9	3.7	14.6	3.1	5.3	4.3	>1	2.6	3	18.4
Dec 2018	CeDem	41.5	10.1	1.1	6.8	>1	2.8	2.6	20.7	3.5	4	3.2	0.1	2.3	1.3	20.8
Dec 2018	NSPM^{[b]}	42.7	18.4	1.3	4.4	1.2	2.1	1.2	14.1	3.5	4.5	3.1	>1	1.5	2.0	24.3
Mar 2018	CeDem	43	12.6	1.1	5.1	>1	3.7	2.4	21.2	4	1.2	2	2.4	0.2	1.1	21.8
Dec 2017	CeDem	39.9	13	—	4.5	0.4	3.5	3.5	21.3	3.9	3.5	2.7	0.7	1	3.2	18.6
Oct 2017	Ipsos^{[b]}	40	15	—	5	—	3	3	23	3	3	3	>1	1	2	17
Oct 2017	DeFacto^{[a]}	38	12.2	—	4.1	—	1.5	4.3	26.1	3.4	1.9	1.9	2	>1	6.6	11.9
July 2017	CeDem	39	11.6	—	4.9	—	4	5.9	19.9	3.9	3.2	3.1	1.2	1.1	3.7	19.1
Dec 2016	CeDem	36.8	21	—	7.8	—	1.6	6.3	12.2	4.1	2.3	3.4	0.8	1.1	3.7	15.8
**Oct 2016**	**Election results**	41.4	**20.3**		**11.1**				**10.1**	**5.2**	**3.2**	**3.1**	**1.2**		**4.2**	**21.1**

The following graph depicts the evolution of standings of the main electoral lists in the poll average since last parliamentary elections in October 2016. Graph of opinion polls conducted, trend lines represent local regressions.

== Results ==
The result was a victory for the lists of parties which were in opposition in the previous parliament: For the Future of Montenegro, Peace is Our Nation and the United Reform Action. Opposition lists won 41 of the 81 seats in the Parliament of Montenegro, while the ruling DPS, together with the Liberal Party, won 30 seats, going into opposition after thirty years in power. Three opposition lists, For the Future of Montenegro, Peace is Our Nation, and the United Reform Action party, which won a combined majority of 41 MPs, announced the formation of a coalition government.

Opposition success at the national level was accompanied by its success at local level elections. It won four out of five municipalities where elections were held, including Budva, Kotor, Tivat and Andrijevica.

Party	Votes	%	Seats	+/–
Democratic Party of Socialists of Montenegro	143,515	35.06	30	–6
For the Future of Montenegro	133,261	32.55	27	+6
Peace is Our Nation	51,298	12.53	10	–2
In Black and White	22,679	5.54	4	+2
Social Democrats of Montenegro	16,761	4.09	3	+1
Bosniak Party	16,279	3.98	3	+1
Social Democratic Party of Montenegro	12,835	3.14	2	–2
Albanian List	6,488	1.58	1	0
Albanian Coalition	4,675	1.14	1	+1
Croatian Civic Initiative	1,106	0.27	0	–1
Croatian Reform Party	496	0.12	0	New
Total	409,393	100.00	81	0
Valid votes	409,393	98.91		
Invalid/blank votes	4,500	1.09		
Total votes	413,893	100.00		
Registered voters/turnout	540,026	76.64		
Source: DIK, Vijesti

== Aftermath ==
=== Reactions ===
Zdravko Krivokapić, ZBCG list leader	Aleksa Bečić, MNN list leader	Dritan Abazović, CnB list leader

The OSCE and ODIHR announced in preliminary findings and conclusions that elections were competitive and held in an atmosphere of high polarization over issues of Serbian Orthodox Church status and Montenegrin national identity, also stating that the election date was not held in accordance with the Constitution, there was no independent campaign coverage, and the ruling party profited unjustifiably through widespread abuse of office and state resources. Furthermore, they pointed out that, contrary to the national legislation and international standards, several opposition MPs were arrested or prosecuted between elections.

Political scientist Florian Bieber described results as the "good news for democracy". Josep Borrell, High Representative of the European Union for Foreign Affairs and Security Policy, and Olivér Várhelyi, European Commissioner for Neighbourhood and Enlargement, stated that they "look forward to the constitution of a new parliament and the formation of a new government that will continue Montenegro's steady path towards the EU." Chair of Women wing of the European People's Party (EPP), Doris Pack supported the new parliamentary majority in Montenegro, criticizing the outgoing DPS regime for "socialist propaganda" tactics, she appealed the Western public and media to not fall in the trap of obvious propaganda, emphasizing that the EU path will undoubtedly remain the principal objective of the new government, after the regime change.

On 1 September, Milo Đukanović conceded defeat, accusing Serbian President Aleksandar Vučić and Belgrade-based media of interfering in the internal politics of Montenegro, as well of alleged trying to revive a "Greater Serbia policy". He stated that it is possible that his party lost its support due to dissatisfaction with some policy, but also due to manipulations from Belgrade, as well from the Serbian Orthodox Church in Montenegro, due to the disputed Law on Religious Communities.

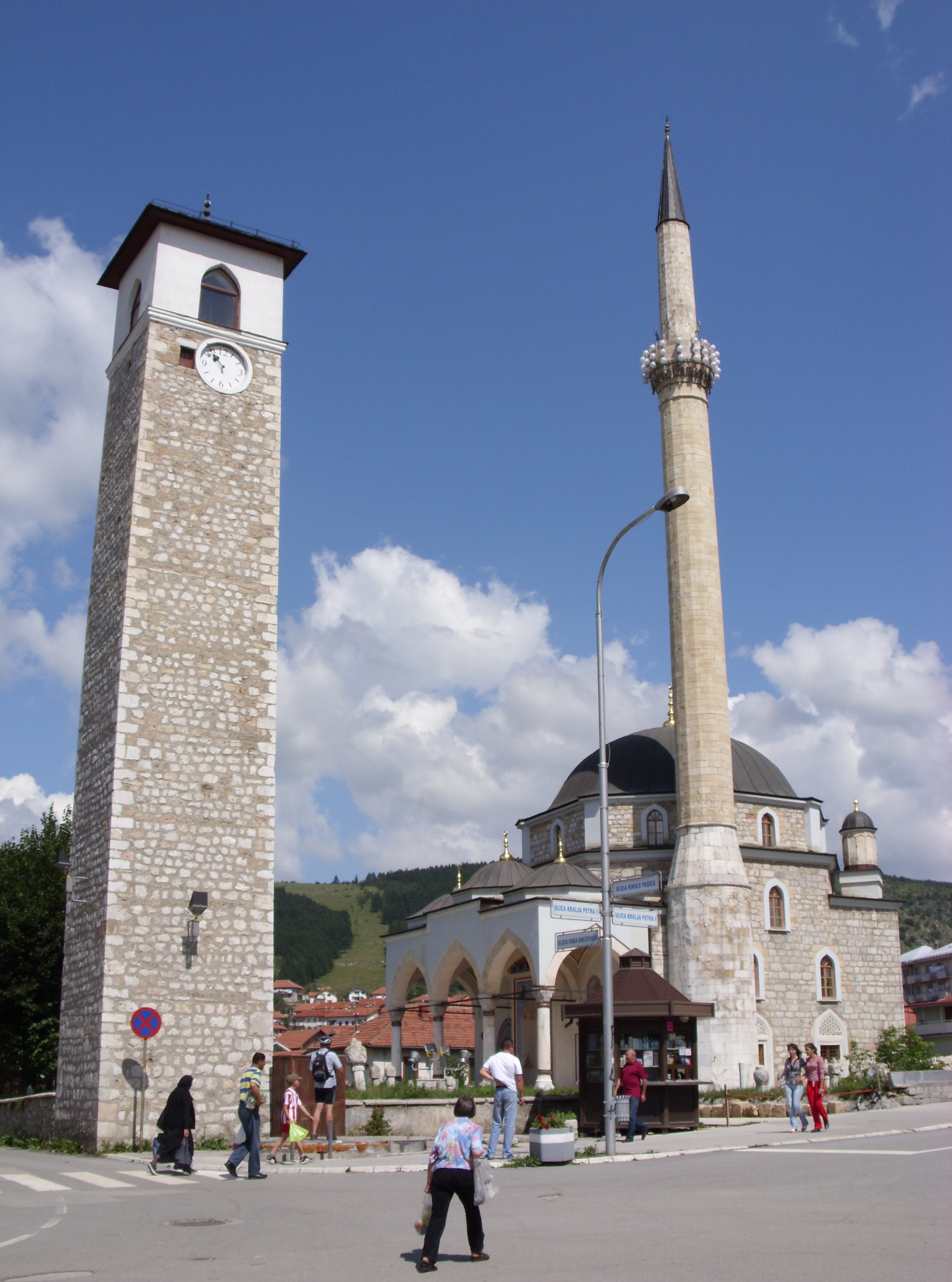
The new majority parties and the Serbian Orthodox priests protested in front of the Husein-paša's Mosque (on photo) in support of the Islamic Community.

=== Incidents ===
Massive celebrations were held all over Montenegro the day after the elections. In Podgorica, opposition supporters clashed with the ruling DPS supporters. Zdravko Krivokapić, Aleksa Bečić and Dritan Abazović, the leaders of the opposition lists, called on supporters to stay at home, as well as authorities to investigate incidents and prosecute any attackers. Although their incumbent cabinet had previously banned all public gatherings due to the COVID-19 pandemic in Montenegro, the ruling Democratic Party of Socialists of President Milo Đukanović announced a counter-meeting, due to the alleged "threat for Montenegrin statehood and independence", in case the DPS falls from a position of power. Representatives of the new parliamentary majority, including Aleksa Bečić, Zdravko Krivokapić, Dritan Abazović, Vladimir Joković, Miodrag Lekić and Vladimir Pavićević strongly condemned violence and conflict, accusing the DPS-led government, the Police Administration and the National Security Agency of Montenegro administration of staging conflict and inciting ethnic hatred and unrest, in order to prevent a peaceful change of decades-long regime in Montenegro. Krivokapić also demanded that the delinquents and perpetrators of the unrest must be identified and prosecuted by the police and the prosecution, as soon as possible.

On 2 September, glass was broken on the door of the Islamic Community of Pljevlja and a message was left saying "The black bird has taken off, Pljevlja will be Srebrenica." The informal group "Bunt Crna Gora" announced that, if the police do not immediately shed light on the case, "Serbs from Pljevlja will organize people's patrols in order to protect their neighbors from DPS subversion." Albin Ćeman, the deputy leader of the opposition Democrats and member of Islamic community, called for calming tensions and accused the ruling party of instructed provocation. The For the Future of Montenegro coalition condemned the incidents and also expressed suspicion that it was done by the outgoing DPS-led regime. Imam of Pljevlja Samir Kadribašić stated that the attacks on the property of the Islamic community were an isolated incident of hooligans and that the new parliamentary majority parties do not represent those values. Kadribašić also expressed doubts about the activities of police in Pljevlja, saying he would hold the police directly responsible if they did not find the perpetrators of the vandalism. Krivokapić protested with Serbian Orthodox Church priests in front of the Husein-paša's Mosque, with the message that they are ready to defend the places of worship of all religious communities in Montenegro.

At the pro-government "Patriotic gathering" in Cetinje, Montenegrin nationalists performed anti-Serb songs by Miroslav Škoro and Marko Perković Thompson, which also included the Ustaše salute. Another pro-government rally was announced for 6 September in Podgorica. Although all mass public gatherings in the country were banned, due the COVID-19 virus spread, government's national coordinating virus control body and law enforcement administration did not respond to the announcement of an unreported mass gathering in the capital, which many assessed as a possible epidemiological and security risk. Many senior Police Administration officials publicly supported the rally, as did the president of the national COVID-19 control body Milutin Simović, who is also a high-ranking member of the ruling DPS. Police Administration stated that, according to their estimates, about 50,000 citizens were present at the rally and that the gathering passed without any incident, without responding to the media whether the gathering was registered and who the organizers were. The participants of the rally accused the new parliamentary majority of allegedly working against Montenegrin national interests, calling them a threat to country independence and statehood. The rally was also marked by inappropriate messages to leaders and members of some parties of the new majority, who were labeled as "traitors" and "chetnik scoundrels". Rally participants's nationalist rhetoric and hate speech has been condemned by numerous media outlets, Montenegrin public figures, artists, university professors, academic and student associations, human rights activists and NGOs.

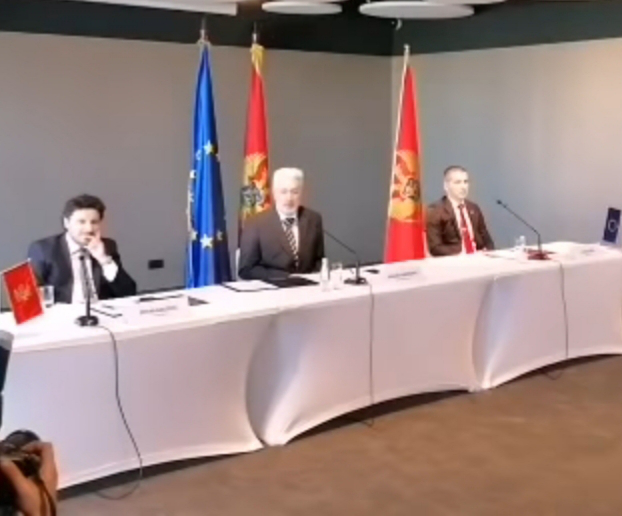
Dritan Abazović, Zdravko Krivokapić and Aleksa Bečić at the signing of the agreement on the principles of the new government of Montenegro, 9 September 2020.

=== Cabinet formation ===
Next day after the election, the leaders of two opposition electoral lists, For the Future of Montenegro and Peace is Our Nation, as well as the United Reform Action party, that combined won a slim majority, agreed to form an expert government, to continue to work on the European Union accession process, fight against corruption, overcoming society polarization and economic crisis, and to work on changing the disputed Law on Religious Communities. They also welcomed the minority parties of Bosniaks and Albanians in Montenegro and wished to form a government with them. Serbian pro-government tabloids have unanimously criticized the coalition agreement between three new parliamentary majority lists, for agreeing not to discuss changing national symbols of Montenegro, the de-recognition of Kosovo, or the country's withdrawal from the NATO, during the new government term, calling Krivokapić "Amfilohije's Prime Minister"

The final draft agreement of the future government coalition of the new majority in Montenegro, composed of three lists that were in opposition in the previous term, was agreed and signed in front of the media on 9 September 2020 in the Podgorica Media Center. The agreement was signed by the leaders of the three winning electoral lists Zdravko Krivokapić (For the Future of Montenegro), Aleksa Bečić (Peace is Our Nation) and Dritan Abazović (United Reform Action). Among other things, they signed a guarantee that the new government will not initiate any procedures to change the national flag, coat of arms or anthem, i.e. that it will respect the current Constitution of Montenegro, that there will be no political revanchism, also that the new government will pass all laws in accordance with European standards, with the aim of achieving EU integration as soon as possible, that it will rapidly and dedicatedly implement all reforms related to European integration of the country, that it will depoliticize main state institutions in order to ensure an uncompromising fight against corruption and crime, and that the new government will respect all current international obligations, including the country's membership in NATO and abandoning all initiatives to de-recognize Kosovo's independence, which previously was advocated by some members of the new parliamentary majority (e. g. Democratic Front, major constituent of For the Future of Montenegro coalition). Krivokapic said that the new government is preparing for the worst-case scenario when it comes to the economy, he said that Montenegro will not be under influence of Serbia or Russia, but that his government will establish better diplomatic relations with both countries, also naming accession of Montenegro to the European Union, as the main priority of the new ruling coalition. The leaders of three lists has signed that it will allow minority parties to participate in government, regardless of whether they have parliamentary status or not. Announcing the new government as reformist, pro-European and dedicated to Montenegrin national interests, as well that it will be officially inaugurated by the end of October, unless the process of taking power is obstructed by President of Montenegro Milo Đukanović, who is also leader of the Democratic Party of Socialists. On September 23, all 41 deputies of the three coalitions of the new majority in parliament officially supported Zdravko Krivokapić as the new prime minister-designate, as well electing Aleksa Bečić new President of the Parliament of Montenegro.

On 4 December 2020, the new government was elected by 41 out of 81 members of the Parliament of Montenegro, and Krivokapić formally became the Prime Minister of Montenegro.
