= 2016–2018 Montenegrin municipal elections =

2016-18 Montenegrin municipal elections
- 7 April 2016 – 27 May 2018
Party	DPS	DCG	SNP
Mayors	16 / 23	3 / 23	2 / 23
Mayors +/-	▼1	▲3	Steady
Party	BS	SD
Mayors	1 / 23	1 / 23
Mayors +/-	▼1	▲1
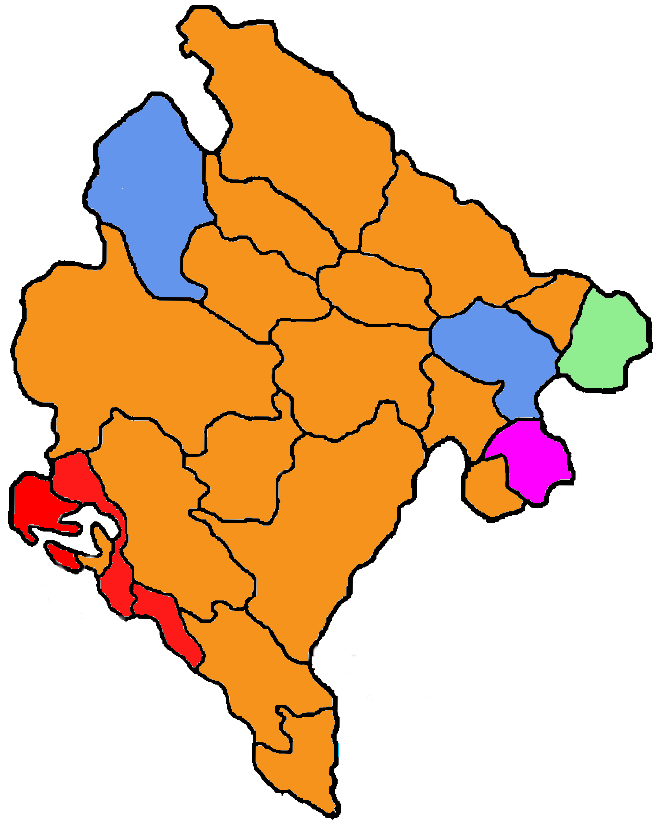
- Mayoral seats
Party	Leader	Vote %	Seats	+/–
DPS	Milo Đukanović	46.81	368	+35
DCG	Aleksa Bečić	10.43	85	New
DF	Andrija Mandić	8.90	70	−57
SD	Ivan Brajović	8.01	63	New
SNP	Vladimir Joković	7.50	59	−56
BS	Rafet Husović	4.45	35	+1
SDP	Ranko Krivokapić	3.56	28	−58
URA	Dritan Abazović	2.29	18	New
This lists parties that won seats. See the complete results below.

Montenegrin municipal elections were held in all 23 municipalities, between April 2016 and May 2018.

== Results ==
=== 2016 elections ===
==== Tivat ====
Summary of the 7 April 2016 Tivat local election results
Parties and coalitions	Popular vote		Seats	
Parties and coalitions	Votes	%	Total	+/−
Democratic Party of Socialists (DPS)	3,374	44.74	17	+5
Social Democrats (SD)	787	10.43	4	+4
Social Democratic Party (SDP)	563	7.46	2	-3
Tivat Action (TA)	544	7.21	2	+2
Socialist People's Party (SNP)	471	6.25	2	-2
Croatian Civic Initiative (HGI)	394	5.22	2	-2
Democratic Serb Party (DSS)	365	4.84	1	-1
Boka Forum (BF)	327	4.34	1	+1
Arsenal for Tivat (AzT)	320	4.24	1	+1
Montenegrin Democratic Union (CDU)	182	2.41	—	—
Party of Serb Radicals (SSR)	139	1.84	—	—
Tivat Liberals (Liberal Party)	76	1.01	—	-1

This election was boycotted by several opposition parties and coalitions due to unfair conditions.

==== Budva ====
Summary of the 16 October 2016 Budva local election results
Parties and coalitions	Popular vote		Seats	
Parties and coalitions	Votes	%	Total	+/−
Democratic Party of Socialists (DPS)	3,883	33.45	12	-2
Democratic Montenegro (Democrats)	2,263	19.49	7	+7
Democratic Front (DF)	2,231	19.22	7	-2
Montenegrin Democratic Union (CDU)	931	8.02	3	+3
Coalition SNP-DEMOS	773	6.60	2	-1
Coalition SDP-URA-Liberals	603	5.19	1	-2
Social Democrats (SD)	456	3.92	1	+1
Civic Action (GA)	205	1.76	—	—
Positive Montenegro (PCG)	134	1.15	—	-3
Independent list "Uplift Budva"	128	1.10	—	—

==== Kotor ====
Summary of the 16 October 2016 Kotor local election results
Parties and coalitions	Popular vote		Seats	
Parties and coalitions	Votes	%	Total	+/−
Democratic Party of Socialists (DPS)	4,014	32.71	12	+1
Democratic Montenegro (Democrats)	1,801	14.68	5	+5
Democratic Front (DF)	1,660	13.53	5	-1
Socialist People's Party (SNP)	996	8.12	3	-1
Social Democratic Party (SDP)	977	7.96	3	-1
Social Democrats (SD)	697	5.68	2	+2
Liberal Party (LP)	535	4.36	1	-1
United Reform Action (URA)	415	3.38	1	+1
Croatian Civic Initiative (HGI)	382	3.10	1	—
Party of Serb Radicals (SSR)	353	2.88	—	—
Democratic Alliance (DEMOS)	264	2.15	—	—
Positive Montenegro (PCG)	177	1.44	—	-3

==== Andrijevica ====
Summary of the 16 October 2016 Andrijevica local election results
Parties and coalitions	Popular vote		Seats	
Parties and coalitions	Votes	%	Total	+/−
Democratic Party of Socialists (DPS)	1,865	57.07	20	-8
Democratic Front (DF)	544	16.65	5	+5
Socialist People's Party (SNP)	518	15.85	5	+3
Social Democrats (SD)	137	4.19	1	+1
Social Democratic Party (SDP)	81	2.23	—	—
Democratic Alliance (DEMOS)	81	2.23	—	—
Positive Montenegro (PCG)	42	1.28	—	-2

==== Gusinje ====
Summary of the 16 October 2016 Gusinje local election results
Parties and coalitions	Popular vote		Seats	
Parties and coalitions	Votes	%	Total	+/−
Democratic Party of Socialists (DPS)	?	26.8	9	+1
Party for Gusinje (PzG)	?	18.4	6	—
Social Democrats (SD)	?	13.7	4	+4
Democratic League (DS)	?	11.5	3	-1
Social Democratic Party (SDP)	?	10.1	3	+1
Coalition DUA-AA	?	8.9	3	-1
Bosniak Party (BS)	?	5.2	1	-1
Socialist People's Party (SNP)	?	4.6	1	—

=== 2017 elections ===
==== Nikšić ====
Summary of the 12 March 2017 Nikšić local election results
Parties and coalitions	Popular vote		Seats	
Parties and coalitions	Votes	%	Total	+/−
Democratic Party of Socialists (DPS)	21,104	80.18	37	+18
Social Democrats (SD)	2,324	8.83	4	+4
Invalid votes/blank	2,894	10.99	—	—

Local election for Nikšić Municipality was held on 12 March 2017. It was boycotted by all the opposition parties after the Government announced the imprisonment of the leaders of the opposition coalition Democratic Front. Only the ruling DPS and its minor partner SD ran in the election, with voter turnout at 45%, while 11% of the votes cast were spoilt.

==== Herceg Novi ====
Summary of the 7 May 2017 Herceg Novi local election results
Parties and coalitions	Popular vote		Seats	
Parties and coalitions	Votes	%	Total	+/−
Democratic Party of Socialists (DPS)	5,134	31.35	12	-1
Democratic Montenegro (Democrats)	3,967	24.22	9	+9
Democratic Front (DF)	1,759	10.74	4	-1
Novi List (NL)	1,274	7.78	3	+1
Socialist People's Party (SNP)	894	5.46	2	-1
The Choice (Izbor)	813	4.96	1	-8
Social Democrats (SD)	759	4.63	1	+1
Social Democratic Party – United Reform Action	673	4.11	1	-1
Civic List for Herceg Novi	603	3.68	1	+1
Democratic Alliance (DEMOS)	191	1.17	—	—
The Montenegrin (CG)	187	1.14	—	—
Boka Democratic League	122	0.74	—	—

==== Cetinje ====
Summary of the 26 November 2017 Cetinje local election results
Parties and coalitions	Popular vote		Seats	
Parties and coalitions	Votes	%	Total	+/−
Democratic Party of Socialists (DPS)	4,391	44.1	16	-3
United Reform Action (URA)	1,434	14.4	5	+5
Democratic Montenegro (Democrats)	1,375	13.8	5	+5
Social Democratic Party (SDP)	926	9.3	3	-2
Old Guard of the Liberal Alliance	672	6.7	2	+2
Social Democrats (SD)	579	5.8	2	+2
Democratic Front (DF)	195	2.0	—	-3
The Montenegrin (CG)	194	2.0	—	—
Positive Montenegro (PCG)	114	1.1	—	-5
Socialist People's Party – Liberal Party	84	0.8	—	—

==== Mojkovac ====
Summary of the 26 November 2017 Mojkovac local election results
Parties and coalitions	Popular vote		Seats	
Parties and coalitions	Votes	%	Total	+/−
Democratic Party of Socialists (DPS)	3,195	54.6	18	+1
Democratic Montenegro (Democrats)	1,003	17.1	5	+5
Democratic Front (DF)	785	13.4	4	-3
Socialist People's Party (SNP)	376	6.4	2	-3
Social Democrats (SD)	210	3.6	1	+1
United Reform Action (URA)	204	3.5	1	+1
Social Democratic Party (SDP)	79	1.3	—	-1

==== Petnjica ====
Summary of the 26 November 2017 Petnjica local election results
Parties and coalitions	Popular vote		Seats	
Parties and coalitions	Votes	%	Total	+/−
Democratic Party of Socialists (DPS)	1745	57,9	20	+5
Bosniak Party (BS)	441	14,6	5	+1
Social Democrats (SD)	348	11,5	3	+3
Social Democratic Party (SDP)	154	5,1	1	-10
Bosniak Democratic Community (BDZ)	103	3,4	1	+1
Democratic Montenegro (Democrats)	98	3,3	1	+1
Positive Montenegro (PCG)	69	2,3	—	—
Socialist People's Party (SNP)	56	1,9	—	-1

=== 2018 elections ===
==== Berane ====
Summary of the 4 February 2018 Berane local election results
Parties and coalitions	Popular vote		Seats	
Parties and coalitions	Votes	%	Total	+/−
Berane Wins (DPS-SD-BS)	7,871	45.7	17	±0
Healthy Berane (DF-SNP-UCG)	6,473	37.6	14	-4
Democratic Montenegro (Democrats)	1,822	10.6	4	+4
SDP-DEMOS Coalition	291	1.7	-	±0
Civic list "Word"	270	1.6	-	±0
United Reform Action (URA)	251	1.5	-	±0
Civic list "Voice of the People for Berane"	153	0.9	-	±0
Justice and Reconciliation Party (SPP)	55	0.3	-	±0
Civic list "Progressive Berane"	25	0.1	-	±0

==== Ulcinj ====
Summary of the 4 February 2018 Ulcinj local election results
Parties and coalitions	Popular vote		Seats	
Parties and coalitions	Votes	%	Total	+/−
Democratic Party of Socialists (DPS)	2,918	23.7	8	–1
New Democratic Force (FORCA)	2,859	23.2	8	+0
Wake up, Ulcinj! (PD, Perspective, LDMZ)	2,383	19.3	7	±0
Democratic Union of Albanians (DUA/UDSH)	1,159	9.4	3	±0
Social Democrats (SD)	1,001	8.1	3	+3
United Reform Action (URA)	686	5.6	2	+2
Social Democratic Party (SDP)	363	2.9	1	–1
Democratic Montenegro (Democrats)	346	2.8	-	±0
Bosniak Party (BS)	339	2.8	1	±1
Socialist People's Party and Democratic Front	269	2.2	-	–2

==== Plužine ====
Summary of the 20 May 2018 Plužine local election results
Parties and coalitions	Popular vote		Seats	
Parties and coalitions	Votes	%	Total	+/−
Socialist People's Party (SNP)	1,143	53.4	16	-1
Democratic Party of Socialists (DPS)	337	15.7	5	-1
Democratic Front (DF)	293	13.7	4	-1
Democratic Montenegro (Democrats)	270	12.6	4	+4
Social Democrats (SD)	98	4.6	1	+1

==== Bar ====
Summary of the 27 May 2018 Bar local election results
Parties and coalitions	Popular vote		Seats	
Parties and coalitions	Votes	%	Total	+/−
Democratic Party of Socialists (DPS)	7,218	34.6	15	+1
Social Democrats (SD)	3,824	18.3	7	+7
Independent List "I Choose Bar" - Radomir Novaković-Cakan	2,580	12.4	5	+5
Democrats and United Reform Action Coalition	2,401	11.5	4	+4
Social Democratic Party (SDP)	1,432	6.9	2	-5
Democratic Front (DF) and Socialist People's Party (SNP)	1,333	6.4	2	-11
Bosniak Party (BS)	814	3.9	1	-1
True Montenegro (PCG)	662	3.2	1	+1
Democratic Alliance (DEMOS)	246	1.2	-	±0
Reform for Bar	194	0.9	-	±0
Democratic League (DS/LD) and Democratic Party (DP/PD)	163	0.8	-	±0

==== Bijelo Polje ====
Summary of the 27 May 2018 Bijelo Polje local election results
Parties and coalitions	Popular vote		Seats	
Parties and coalitions	Votes	%	Total	+/−
Democratic Party of Socialists (DPS) - Bosniak Party (BS) - Social Democrats (SD)	13811	59,9	25	+4
Democrats and United Reform Action Coalition	2238	9,7	4	+4
Democratic Front (DF)	2220	9,6	4	-1
Socialist People's Party (SNP)	1557	6,8	2	-5
Social Democratic Party (SDP)	1525	6,6	2	-3
United Montenegro (UCG)	940	4,1	1	+1
Serb Coalition	515	2,2	-	±0
Justice and Reconciliation Party and the Montenegrin	254	1,1	-	±0

==== Danilovgrad ====
Summary of the 27 May 2018 Danilovgrad local election results
Parties and coalitions	Popular vote		Seats	
Parties and coalitions	Votes	%	Total	+/−
Democratic Party of Socialists (DPS)	4422	52,3	19	+2
Democrats and United Reform Action Coalition	1533	18,1	6	+6
Social Democrats (SD)	788	9,3	3	+3
SNP - DNP - JKP Coalition	635	7,5	2	-2
New Serb Democracy (NSD)	514	6,1	2	-7
True Montenegro (PCG)	319	3,8	1	+1
Social Democratic Party (SDP)	238	2,8	-	-3

==== Kolašin ====
Summary of the 27 May 2018 Kolašin local election results
Parties and coalitions	Popular vote		Seats	
Parties and coalitions	Votes	%	Total	+/−
Democratic Party of Socialists (DPS)	1983	39,0	13	+3
Democratic Montenegro (Democrats)	916	18,0	6	+6
Democratic Front (DF) - Socialist People's Party (SNP)	798	15,7	5	-11
Groups of voters "Šule and Mikan with Citizens for Kolašin"	490	9,6	3	+3
Social Democrats (SD)	435	8,6	2	+2
Social Democratic Party (SDP)	343	6,7	2	-1
United Montenegro (UCG)	120	2,4	-	±0

==== Plav ====
Summary of the 27 May 2018 Plav local election results
Parties and coalitions	Popular vote		Seats	
Parties and coalitions	Votes	%	Total	+/−
Social Democrats (SD)	1485	29,6	10	+10
Bosniak Party (BS)	1022	20,4	7	-1
Democratic Party of Socialists (DPS)	962	19,2	6	-5
Social Democratic Party (SDP)	528	10,5	3	-4
Democratic Front (DF) and Socialist People's Party (SNP)	336	6,7	2	-3
Albanian Alternative (AA)	247	4,9	1	+1
Group of Voters – I vote for Plav	230	4,6	1	+1
Democratic Montenegro (Democrats)	175	3,5	1	+1
Justice and Reconciliation Party (SPP)	27	0,5	-	±0

==== Pljevlja ====
Summary of the 27 May 2018 Pljevlja local election results
Parties and coalitions	Popular vote		Seats	
Parties and coalitions	Votes	%	Total	+/−
Democratic Party of Socialists - Social Democrats - Bosniak Party	10138	53,7	20	+3
Democrats	3743	19,8	7	+7
New Serb Democracy - Socialist People's Party - Movement for Changes	2467	13,1	4	-13
Democratic People's Party - Movement for Pljevlja - True Montenegro	2207	11,7	4	+4
Social Democratic Party	337	1,7	-	±0

==== Podgorica ====
Summary of the 27 May 2018 Podgorica local election results
Parties and coalitions	Popular vote		Seats	
Parties and coalitions	Votes	%	Total	+/−
DPS Coalition (DPS - BS - DUA - LP - CRN - PCG)	48047	47,7	32	+3
Democrats and United Reform Action Coalition	26032	25,8	17	+17
Democratic Front (DF) and Socialist People's Party (SNP)	12291	12,2	8	-17
Social Democrats (SD)	5122	5,1	3	+3
Social Democratic Party (SDP) and DEMOS	2985	3,0	-	-8
True Montenegro (PCG)	2399	2,4	-	±0
Albanian Alternative (АА)	1492	1,5	1	+1
United Montenegro (UCG)	1409	1,4	-	±0
Citizen Group – Saša Mijović	746	0,7	-	±0
Serb Coalition	199	0,2	-	±0

==== Rožaje ====
Summary of the 27 May 2018 Rožaje local election results
Parties and coalitions	Popular vote		Seats	
Parties and coalitions	Votes	%	Total	+/−
Bosniak Party (BS)	6825	50,9	19	+2
Democratic Party of Socialists (DPS)	3724	27,8	10	-2
Social Democrats (SD)	1559	11,6	4	+4
Social Democratic Party (SDP)	610	4,6	1	-3
Justice and Reconciliation Party (SPP)	378	2,8	-	-1
Democratic Montenegro (Democrats)	106	0,8	-	±0
United Reform Action (URA)	100	0,7	-	±0
Compliant to Rožaje - fraternal and frank forward	70	0,5	-	±0
Changes for a Better Rožaje - Aida Nina Kurpejović	30	0,2	-	±0

==== Šavnik ====
Summary of the 27 May 2018 Šavnik local election results
Parties and coalitions	Popular vote		Seats	
Parties and coalitions	Votes	%	Total	+/−
Democratic Party of Socialists (DPS) and Social Democrats (SD)	862	61,8	19	+2
Socialist People's Party (SNP) and Democratic Front (DF)	381	27,3	8	-5
Democratic Montenegro (Democrats)	152	10,9	3	+3

==== Žabljak ====
Summary of the 27 May 2018 Žabljak local election results
Parties and coalitions	Popular vote		Seats	
Parties and coalitions	Votes	%	Total	+/−
Democratic Party of Socialists (DPS) and Social Democrats (SD)	1303	55,8	18	+1
Democratic Front (DF) and Socialist People's Party (SNP)	525	22,5	7	-6
Democratic Montenegro (Democrats)	506	21,7	6	+6

== Statistics ==
=== Elected mayors and local governments ===
Municipality	Mayor	Party	Local government	Elected
Podgorica	Ivan Vuković	DPS	DPS-SD-AA	2018
Nikšić	Veselin Grbović	DPS	DPS-SD	2017
Bijelo Polje	Petar Smolović	DPS	DPS-SD	2018
Bar	Zoran Srzentić	DPS	DPS-SD-BB-BS	2018
Herceg Novi	Stevan Katić	DCG	DCG-DF-SNP-NL-SDP-URA	2017
Pljevlja	Mirko Đačić	DPS	DPS-SD-BS	2018
Berane	Dragoslav Šćekić	SNP	SNP-DF-DCG	2018
Rožaje	Ejup Nurković	BS	BS-DPS	2018
Kotor	Vladimir Jokić	DCG	DCG-DF-SDP-URA	2016
Ulcinj	Ljoro Nrekić	DPS	DPS-FORCA	2018
Budva	Dragan Krapović	DCG	DCG-DF-SNP-SDP-CG-URA	2016
Danilovgrad	Zorica Kovačević	DPS	DPS-SD	2018
Cetinje	Aleksandar Kašćelan	DPS	DPS-SD	2017
Tivat	Snežana Matijević	DPS	DPS-SD-HGI	2016
Plav	Mirsad Bajraktarević	SD	SD-DPS-BS	2018
Mojkovac	Ranko Mišnić	DPS	DPS-SD	2017
Kolašin	Milosav Bulatović	DPS	DPS-SD	2018
Petnjica	Samir Agović	DPS	DPS-SD	2017
Andrijevica	Srđan Mašović	DPS	DPS-SD	2016
Gusinje	Anela Čekič	DPS	DPS-SD-BS-DUA	2016
Žabljak	Isailo Šljivančanin	DPS	DPS-SD	2018
Plužine	Mijuško Bajagić	SNP	SNP	2018
Šavnik	Velimir Perišić	DPS	DPS-SD	2018

=== Seats in local parliaments ===
DPS (368)	46.81%
DCG (85)	10.43%
DF (70)	8.90%
SD (63)	8.01%
SNP (59)	7.50%
BS (35)	4.45%
SDP (28)	3.56%
URA (18)	2.29%
AO (14)	1.78%
Minor/local (46)	5.85%

=== Mayoral seats ===
DPS (16)	69.56%
DCG (3)	13.04%
SNP (2)	8.69%
BS (1)	4.34%
SD (1)	4.34%
