= 2018 Montenegrin presidential election =

Presidential election held in Montenegro

- 15 April 2018
- Registered: 532,599
- Turnout: 63.92% (▲0.02pp)
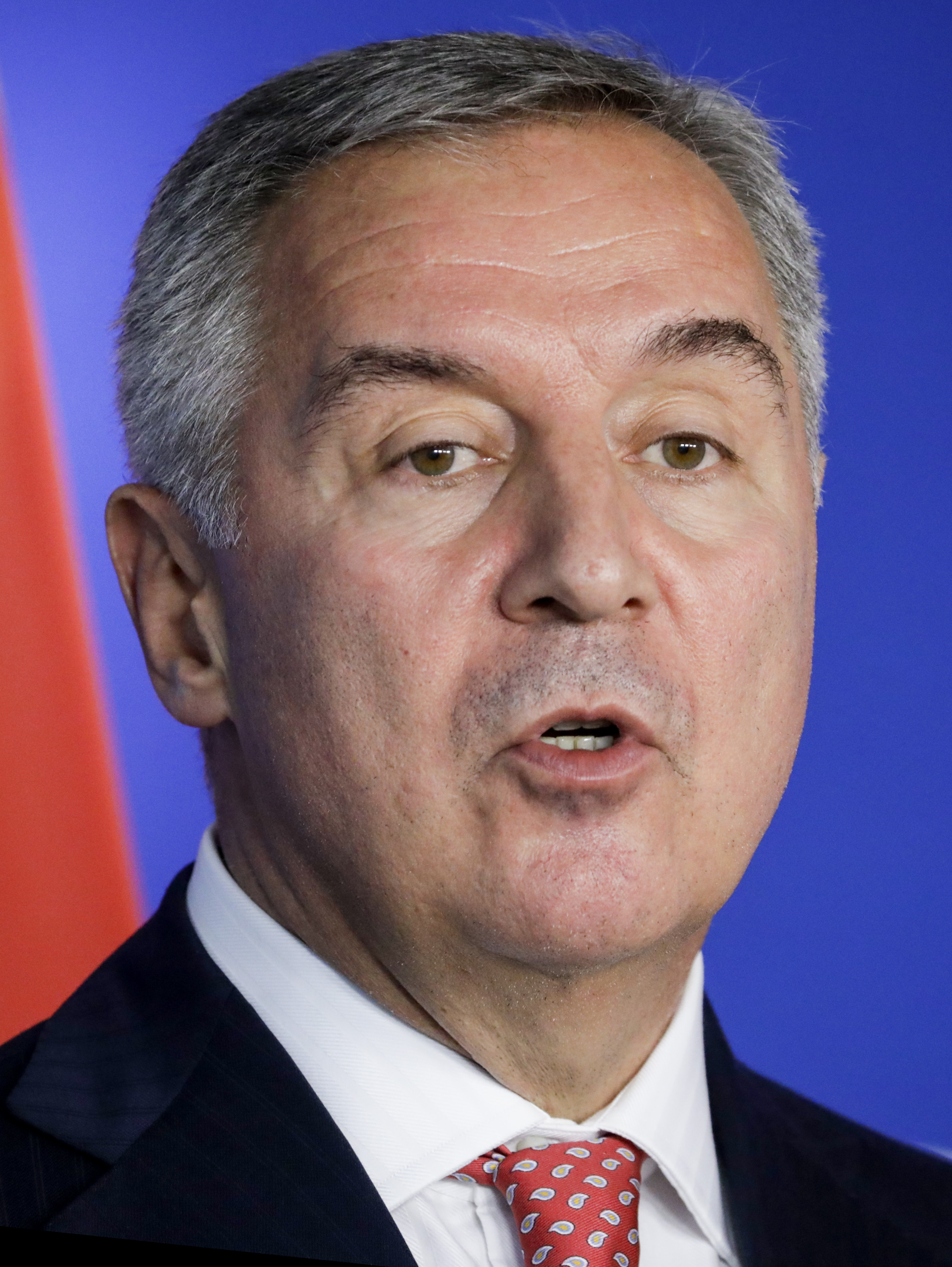

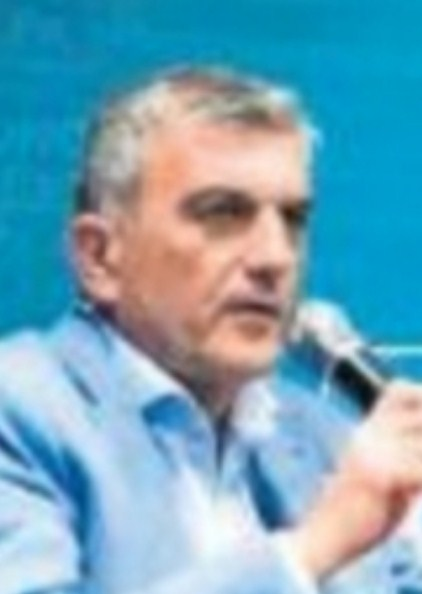

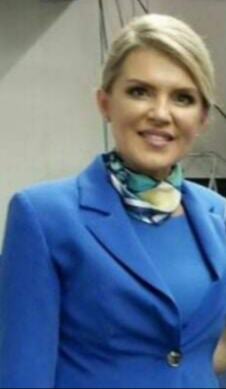
Candidate	Milo Đukanović	Mladen Bojanić	Draginja Vuksanović
Party	DPS	Independent	SDP
Popular vote	180,272	111,711	27,441
Percentage	53.90%	33.40%	8.20%
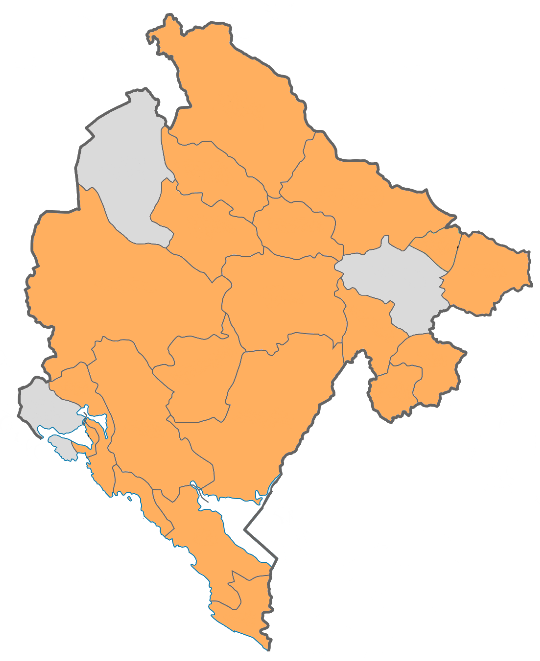
- Results by municipality Đukanović Bojanić
President before election
Filip Vujanović
DPS
Elected President
Milo Đukanović
DPS

Presidential elections were held in Montenegro on 15 April 2018. Former Prime Minister Milo Đukanović, leader of the ruling DPS was elected as new President of Montenegro in the first round.

== Electoral system ==
The president is elected using the two-round system; if no candidate receives a majority of the vote in the first round, a run-off is held two weeks later. In order to submit their candidacy to the State Electoral Commission, potential candidates needed to collect 7,993 signatures. President is elected every five years, and is eligible for two terms.

== Campaign ==
The incumbent president, Filip Vujanović, was ineligible for re-election, having already served three terms as president.

President of the ruling DPS, Milo Đukanović, who was touted by the media as the election favourite, initially rejected the possibility of running for president.

In March 2018, Đukanović confirmed that he would run for president, supported by DPS' coalition partner, the Liberal Party, as well as other subjects in the government; Social Democrats, Croatian Civic Initiative, the New Democratic Power, Democratic Union of Albanians and the Bosniak Party.

After a series of unsuccessful attempts by the entire opposition to nominate a common candidate, it was clear that the opposition would have more candidates. On 9 March 2018, the presidency of right-wing Democratic Front alliance decides to support the candidacy of independent candidate Mladen Bojanić, which was previously proposed by the centrist Democratic Montenegro and the centre-left United Reform Action. Presidency of the newly-formed centre-right United Montenegro has decided to support the previously announced candidacy of the party leader Goran Danilović, later Presidency of centre-left Social Democratic Party has consistently endorsed candidacy of MP Draginja Vuksanović, making her first ever female presidential candidate, with support of centre-right DEMOS party led by Miodrag Lekić, common opposition presidential candidate at the previous election.

From the rest of the opposition have unsuccessfully called upon the SDP and Danilović's United Montenegro party to withdraw their candidacies and support independent Bojanić as an opposition common candidate, which they have refused. From SDP replied that Bojanić was not a completely independent candidate, alluding to his alleged support for the Democratic Front list for the 2016 parliamentary election. On 21 March Danilović ultimately withdrew his candidacy and supported Bojanić's candidature.

== Candidates ==
Montenegrin State Electoral Commission (DIK) confirmed seven candidates. Candidate numbers were decided using a random draw on 28 March.

#	Candidate	Party	Details
1	Marko Milačić	PCG	Journalist, president of the extra-parliamentary party True Montenegro
2	Mladen Bojanić	Ind.	Independent, former MP. Supported by DF, DCG, SNP, URA and UCG
3	Hazbija Kalač	SPP	President of the extra-parliamentary Justice and Reconciliation Party
4	Vasilije Miličković	n-p	Businessman, independent, supported by the extra-parliamentary PUPI
5	Dobrilo Dedeić	SL	President of the extra-parliamentary Serb List, leader of Serb Coalition.
6	Draginja Vuksanović	SDP	Professor of law, MP of the Social Democratic Party, supported by DEMOS
7	Milo Đukanović	DPS	Former President and six-time PM. Leader of the DPS; government candidate; endorsed by the Social Democrats.

== Opinion polls ==
Poll results are listed in the table below in reverse chronological order, showing the most recent first, and using the date the survey's fieldwork was done, as opposed to the date of publication. If such date is unknown, the date of publication is given instead. The highest percentage figure in each polling survey is displayed in bold, and the background shaded in the leading party's colour. In the instance that there is a tie, then no figure is shaded. The lead column on the right shows the percentage-point difference between the two candidates with the highest figures.

Date	Polling source	Đukanović	Bojanić	Vuksanović	Others	Lead
29 March 2018	CeDem	**50.6**	35.5	7.9	5.9	15.1

== Electoral debates ==
Date Time	Broadcaster	Candidates						
Date Time	Broadcaster	Milačić	Bojanić	Kalač	Miličković	Dedeić	Vuksanović	Đukanović
13 April; 20:00	TVCG1	P	P	P	P	A	P	A
12 April; 20:00	Vijesti	NI	P	NI	NI	NI	P	A
30 March; 20:00	TVCG1	P	P	P	P	P	P	A
P Invited/Present NI Non-invitee A Absent invitee

== Results ==
Milo Đukanović, candidate of the DPS-led coalition, won the election in the first round, winning 53.9% of the vote. Independent opposition candidate Mladen Bojanić came in second with 33.4% of the popular vote, while Draginja Vuksanović (SDP) was third with 8.2%.

Candidate	Party	Votes	%
Milo Đukanović	Democratic Party of Socialists	180,272	53.90
Mladen Bojanić	Independent	111,711	33.40
Draginja Vuksanović	Social Democratic Party	27,441	8.20
Marko Milačić	True Montenegro	9,405	2.81
Hazbija Kalač	Justice and Reconciliation Party	2,677	0.80
Vasilije Miličković	Independent	1,593	0.48
Dobrilo Dedeić	Serb List	1,363	0.41
**Total**		**334,462**	**100.00**
Valid votes		334,462	98.24
Invalid/blank votes		5,997	1.76
Total votes		**340,459**	**100.00**
Registered voters/turnout		532,599	63.92
Source: DIK

=== By municipality ===
Municipality	Đukanović		Bojanić		Vuksanović		Milačić		Kalač		Miličković		Dedeić	
Municipality	Votes	%	Votes	%	Votes	%	Votes	%	Votes	%	Votes	%	Votes	%
Andrijevica	2,048	66.66	901	29.33	59	1.92	44	1.43	1	0.0	2	0.07	17	0.6
Bar	11,370	53.93	5,580	26.47	3,137	14.88	688	3.26	119	0.56	97	0.46	91	0.43
Berane	7,192	46.61	7,325	47.48	440	2.85	336	2.18	42	0.27	22	0.14	72	0.47
Bijelo Polje	14,386	58.40	7,409	30.08	2,121	8.61	336	1.41	256	1.04	39	0.16	74	0.30
Budva	4,178	43.29	3,942	40.85	1,021	10.58	361	3.74	8	0.08	95	0.98	46	0.48
Cetinje	4,659	55.96	1,860	22.34	1,510	18.14	169	2.03	30	0.36	79	0.95	18	0.21
Danilovgrad	4,773	52.94	3,339	37.04	581	6.44	230	2.55	13	0.14	31	0.34	48	0.53
Gusinje	1,331	85.54	56	3.59	118	7.58	7	0.45	43	2.76	0	0	1	0.06
Herceg Novi	5,983	41.17	6,182	42.54	1,049	7.22	999	6.87	39	0.27	118	0.81	162	1.11
Kolašin	2,201	47.32	1,963	42.20	322	6.92	117	2.51	9	0.19	16	0.34	23	0.49
Kotor	4,766	46.47	3,949	38.51	1,017	9.92	336	3.27	32	0.31	86	0.84	69	0.67
Mojkovac	2,839	54.18	2,106	40.19	178	3.39	78	1.49	7	0.13	11	0.21	21	0.4
Nikšić	22,791	55.77	13,849	33.89	2,773	6.78	1,116	2.73	71	0.17	135	0.33	129	0.31
Petnjica	2,382	83.46	80	2.80	234	8.19	10	0.35	142	4.97	2	0.07	4	0.14
Plav	2,829	66.45	707	16.61	486	11.41	72	1.69	146	3.43	7	0.16	10	0.23
Plužine	542	29.44	1,183	64.25	53	2.88	41	2.22	2	0.1	9	0.49	11	0.59
Pljevlja	9,477	51.89	7,721	42.28	576	3.15	294	1.61	83	0.45	26	0.14	84	0.46
Podgorica	54,532	50.90	38,752	36.17	8,717	8.13	3,698	3.45	327	0.30	707	0.66	386	0.36
Rožaje	8,454	76.56	343	3.1	986	8.93	22	0.2	1,219	11.39	6	0.05	12	0.1
Šavnik	804	58.90	497	36.41	33	2.41	25	1.83	2	0.14	1	0.07	3	0.22
Tivat	3,907	54.04	2,070	28.63	850	11.75	270	3.73	21	0.29	61	0.84	51	0.7
Ulcinj	7,353	77.87	820	8.68	1,100	11.65	71	0.75	54	0.57	32	0.34	12	0.1
Žabljak	1,161	47.58	950	38.93	55	2.25	51	2.1	5	0.2	7	0.3	11	0.45
Totals	180,272	53.90	111,711	33.40	27,441	8.20	9,405	2.81	2,677	0.80	1,593	0.48	1,363	0.41
Source: Vijesti

== Aftermath ==
In its June 2018 report, issued after the presidential election, the Organization for Security and Co-operation in Europe's Office for Democratic Institutions and Human Rights, Office for Democratic Institutions and Human Rights, called for election reforms in Montenegro, and for more integrity, impartiality and professionalism in election administration.
