= Party of United Pensioners and the Disabled =

- Leader: Momir Joksimović
- Founded: 2009
- Headquarters: Podgorica
- Ideology: Pensioners' interests
- Political position: Single issue
- National affiliation: Peace is Our Nation (2020–2022)
- Colours: Yellow Grey
- Parliament of Montenegro: 0 / 81

The Party of Pensioners, Disabled and Restitution (Montenegrin: Партија пензионера, инвалида и реституције / Partija penzionera, invalida i restitucije), also known by its initial name Party of United Pensioners and the Disabled (Montenegrin: Partija ujedinjenih penzionera i invalida, PUPI) is a minor single-issue politics party, representing the interests of pensioners in Montenegro.

== History ==
Party was founded in 2009. In 2009 parliamentary election PUPI ran independently and won 2.4% of the votes, just below the 3% electoral threshold. At the 2012 parliamentary election the party participated within a left-wing "Together" coalition, along with Yugoslav Communist Party of Montenegro, which won only 0,38% of votes. Shortly after the election the party joined the coalition with the populist Democratic Front alliance, which it leaves after the 2016 election, at which the party again failed to win a parliamentary status.

In July 2020, PUPI decided to enter the big tent Peace is Our Nation (initially the Citizens' Bloc) coalition with Democratic Montenegro, DEMOS and the New Left in order to participate at the forthcoming August 2020 parliamentary election.

In 2023 the party did't run for parliament, but supported the Europe Now Movement in the elections.

== Parliamentary elections ==
Parliament of Montenegro
Year	Popular vote	% of popular vote	Overall seats won	Coalition	Government
2009	7,691	2.40%	0 / 81	—	extra-parliamentary
2012	1,384	0.38%	0 / 81	Together	extra-parliamentary
2016	77,784	20.32%	0 / 81	with DF	extra-parliamentary
2020	51,298	12.53%	0 / 81	with MNN	extra-parliamentary
