= Key Coalition =

Key Coalition Коалиција Кључ Koalicija Ključ
- Leader: Miodrag Lekić
- Founded: 31 August 2016
- Dissolved: November 2016
- Headquarters: Podgorica
- Ideology: Catch-all coalition Pro-Europeanism
- Political position: Big tent
- Slogan: Best for Montenegro!
- Parliament (2016): 9 / 81

The Key Coalition (Montenegrin: Коалиција Кључ / Koalicija Ključ) was an opposition political alliance in Montenegro. It was composed of the Democratic Alliance (DEMOS), Socialist People's Party (SNP) and United Reform Action (URA). The main goal of the coalition was to overthrow the ruling Democratic Party of Socialists of Montenegro (DPS) of Milo Đukanović, which has been in power since 1991. Miodrag Lekić led the joint electoral list in the parliamentary election in October 2016.

The coalition ran in the 2016 parliamentary election under the slogan "The best for Montenegro!". However, following the election, in which the Key Coalition won 11.05% of the votes and 9 seats, its member parties went on to create separate parliamentary groups and the coalition was de facto dissolved.

== Elections ==
=== Parliamentary election ===
Parliament of Montenegro
Year	Leader	Popular vote	% of popular vote	Seats	Seat change	Status
2016	Miodrag Lekić	42,295	11.05%	9 / 81	▼4	opposition

== Member parties ==
Party name	Abbr.	Ideology	Leader	Seats won	±
Democratic Alliance; Demokratski savez Демократски савез	DEMOS	Liberal conservatism Pro-Europeanism	Miodrag Lekić	4 / 81	Steady
Socialist People's Party; Socijalistička narodna partija Социјалистичка народна партија	SNP	Social democracy Social conservatism	Srđan Milić	3 / 81	▼4
United Reform Action; Ujedinjena reformska akcija Уједињена реформска акција	URA	Social liberalism Pro-Europeanism	Žarko Rakčević	2 / 81	Steady
