= Peace is Our Nation =

Montenegrin political coalition

Peace is Our Nation Mir je naša nacija Мир је наша нација
- Leader: Aleksa Bečić
- Founded: 12 July 2020
- Dissolved: 2023
- Succeeded by: Aleksa and Dritan – Count Bravely!
- Headquarters: Podgorica
- Ideology: Catch-all alliance Anti-corruption; Pro-Europeanism
- Political position: Centre
- Slogan: We Are Family
- Parliament: 10 / 81
- Mayors: 3 / 25
- Local Parliaments: 99 / 847

The Peace is Our Nation (Montenegrin and Serbian: Mir je naša nacija / Мир је наша нација), initially announced as the Citizens' Bloc (Građanski blok / Грађански блок), was a big tent, moderate and pro-European political coalition in Montenegro, formed for the August 2020 parliamentary election.

== History ==
The coalition was formed on 12 July 2020, and it is composed of the Democrats, DEMOS, the New Left, PUPI, as well some independent candidates, such as liberal politician Vladimir Pavićević, former leader of the Montenegrin party.

The main goal of the coalition is to overthrow the ruling Democratic Party of Socialists (DPS) of President Milo Đukanović, which has been in power since 1991, announcing an anticorruption, reformist and moderate platform, also representing itself as civic and multinational alternative to the growing populist and nationalist rhetoric within the ruling DPS and opposition Democratic Front (DF), which they accuse of polarizing Montenegrin society and inciting ethnic hatred and unrest. Leader of the Democrats Aleksa Bečić will head the joint electoral list for the parliamentary election in August 2020.

The August 2020 election resulted in a victory for the opposition parties and the fall from power of the ruling DPS, which has ruled the country since the introduction of the multi-party system in 1990. The coalition won 12.54% of the popular vote, which equals 10 seats in the parliament. Coalition list leader Bečić and the leaders of the lists For the Future of Montenegro and United Reform Action, Zdravko Krivokapić and Dritan Abazović, agreed during meeting on several principles on which the future government will rest, including the formation of an expert government, to continue to work on the European Union accession process, fight against corruption, overcoming society polarization, and to work on changing the disputed Law on Religious Communities. They welcomed minority parties of Bosniaks and Albanians, and wished to form government with them.

== Electoral performance ==
=== Parliamentary election ===
Election	Ballot carrier	Popular vote	% of popular vote	Overall seats won	Government
2020	Aleksa Bečić	51,298	12.53%	10 / 81	Support 2020-22
2020	Aleksa Bečić	51,298	12.53%	10 / 81	Opposition 2022-23

== Members ==
Party	Main ideology	Position	Leader	No. of seats
Democrats	Conservative liberalism Pro-Europeanism	Centre	Aleksa Bečić	9 / 81
DEMOS	Liberalism; Pro-Europeanism	Centre to centre-right	Miodrag Lekić	1 / 81
Pensioners'	Pensioners' interests Social justice	Single-issue	Momir Joksimović	0 / 81
Former members of the coalition				Membership
New Left	Social liberalism Pro-Europeanism	Centre-left	Saša Mijović	2020 (parl.)
IPPT^{[n-p]}	Economic liberalism Pro-Europeanism	Centre	Vladimir Pavićević	2020 (parl.)
NDCG	Christian democracy Pro-Europeanism	Centre-right	Vesna Bratić	2021 (local)
