= Mladi liberali Crne Gore =

Liberal youth of Montenegro Mladi liberali Crne Gore
- President: Ammar Borančić
- Founded: 1990
- Headquarters: Podgorica
- Ideology: Liberalism
- International affiliation: International Federation of Liberal Youth, European Liberal Youth, ISEEL-Balkan liberal network,
- Colours: Blue and white (Montenegrin colors)

Website
- http://www.mladi-liberali.blogspot.com

Mladi Liberali Crne Gore (Liberal Youth of Montenegro) is the National Youth wing of the Liberal Party of Montenegro. It brings together young people who believe in the ideas of liberalism and liberal democracy. It was founded on October 30, 2004 by young members of the Liberal Alliance of Montenegro. The members of the Liberal Youth are members of the Liberal Party between the ages 18 and 30.

== Political profile ==
The Liberal Youth of Montenegro is the only Montenegrin organization of young liberals that brings together young people focused on the idea of liberalism. Young liberals are an integral part of the Liberal Party. Each group within the party enjoys relative autonomy. The young liberals recognized since the 1990s when they were active participants in the anti-war movement. They were active in the movement for a sovereign state of Montenegro, led by the Liberal Alliance. The organization is recognized as a progressive force. It initiates social reforms and fosters a broad debate on the foundation of liberalism, along with other topics considered taboo by a conservative society. One of the main objectives of the organization is to promote the idea of individuals in a free society.

== Structure ==
The structure of the organization is determined by the Statutes of the Liberal youth. The MLCG organization relies on an administrative division of Montenegro and operates within Liberal Party committees in each municipality. It coordinates the work of the organization via the Secretary and Vice President.

Administration:

- Conference: constituted of elected representatives from the other organs of Young Liberals. It elects the President of Young Liberals, adopts statutes and programs, establishes policy guidelines for activities between the two Conferences, adopts the Declaration and Resolutions, and performs other tasks.
- President: represents the Young Liberals in the Liberal Party, convenes and manages the work of the Presidency of the Conference, performs other tasks.
- Presidency: creates and maintains policy, implements the decisions of the Conference and other acts, coordinates the executive body of the Young Liberals with the Presidents of Municipal youth organizations.

== International membership ==
- International Federation of Liberal Youth
- European Liberal Youth
- Balkan liberal network - ISEEL

== See also ==
- Liberalism
- Contributions to liberal theory
- Liberalism worldwide
- List of liberal parties
- Liberal democracy
- Liberalism in Montenegro
