= National symbols of Montenegro =

National symbols of Montenegro are the symbols that are used in Montenegro to represent what is unique about the nation, reflecting different aspects of its cultural life and history.

== Symbols of Montenegro ==
Type	Image	Symbol
National flag		Flag of Montenegro; The flag of Montenegro is red, with the coat of arms in the middle, and golden borders. The ratio of the flag is 1:2. The coat of arms takes up 2/3 of the flag's height. The middle point of the coat of arms matches the middle point of the flag. The width of the border is 1/20 of the flag's proportions. Two versions of the Montenegrin flag are in use, horizontal, mostly used outdoor; and vertical, mostly used indoor.
Coat of arms		Coat of arms of Montenegro; The charge is a two-headed eagle which is a symbol of Byzantine and ultimately Roman origin. It symbolises dual authority, such as that over the church and state. The motif was used by medieval rulers of Zeta—the House of Crnojević, as well as various other European dynasties. The layout of the Montenegrin coat of arms is inspired by that of the Russian Empire, with which the ruling House of Petrović-Njegoš had close dynastic and political ties in the 19th century when the coat of arms was first adopted in its present form.
National anthem	Oj, svijetla majska zoro (Instrumental)	Oj, svijetla majska zoro "Oj, svijetla majska zoro" (Montenegrin Cyrillic: „Ој, свијетла мајска зоро”, trans. "Oh, Bright Dawn of May") is the official national anthem of Montenegro adopted in 2004. Before becoming the anthem, it was a popular folk song of the Montenegrins, with many variations of its text. The oldest one is dated to the 2nd half of the 19th century, known as "Oh, Bright Dawn of Heroism, oh!", a popular Montenegrin folk song.
National animal		Balkan lynx (Lynx lynx balcanicus)
National bird		Golden eagle (Aquila chrysaetos)
National tree		Mirovica olive tree
National flower		Mimoza
National mount		Mount Lovćen
National dress		Montenegrin costume
National instrument		Gusle
National dance		Montenegrin Oro
National drink		Rakija
National colours	Red and gold	Red #C40308 Gold #D4AF3A
