= Draginja Vuksanović-Stanković =

Montenegrin politician

Draginja Vuksanović
- Драгиња Вуксановић
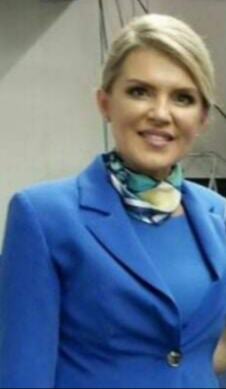
- Draginja Vuksanović in 2018

Member of Parliament
- Incumbent
- Assumed office 14 October 2012

Personal details
- Born: 7 April 1978 (age 48) Bar, SR Montenegro, SFR Yugoslavia
- Party: Social Democratic Party
- Spouse: Ivica Stanković
- Education: University of Montenegro
- Profession: Jurist, politician, professor
- Website: mojapredsjednica.me

Draginja Vuksanović-Stanković (Montenegrin Cyrillic: Драгиња Вуксановић-Станковић; born 7 April 1978) is a Montenegrin jurist, politician and professor of law at the University of Montenegro. She is former member of Parliament and the former president of the Social Democratic Party. At the 2018 presidential election, she became the first female presidential candidate in the history of the country, and also appeared in 2023 presidential election campaign.

== Biography ==
Vuksanović graduated from the Faculty of Law at the University of Montenegro in 2000, earning the master's degree in 2005, and the doctoral degree in 2011 at the same university. She works as a professor at the Faculty of Law and Faculty of Dramatic Arts of the University of Montenegro. She speaks Montenegrin, French and English, while also using Italian and Spanish languages. Her mother is a Serbian Orthodox, but she follows the Montenegrin Orthodox Church.

== Political career ==
Draginja Vuksanović is a member of the Social Democratic Party of Montenegro (SDP), and a member of the Parliament of Montenegro since 2012. In March 2018, Vuksanović announced her candidacy for the upcoming presidential election. She was nominated by the Social Democratic Party and supported by DEMOS, as the first female presidential candidate in the history of Montenegro. Vuksanović came third in the election, winning 8.2% of the votes.

On 29 June 2019, Vuksanović was elected president of the Social Democratic Party, making her the only female president of a Montenegrin political party, at the time. Vuksanović resigned after the poor results at the 2020 parliamentary election.

== See also ==
- Social Democratic Party of Montenegro
- 2018 Montenegrin presidential election
- 2023 Montenegrin presidential election
