= Yugoslav Communist Party of Montenegro =

Yugoslav Communist Party Jugoslovenska komunistička partija
- President of the Central Committee: Radislav Stanišić (since 2019)
- Founded: 25 September 2009
- Headquarters: Podgorica
- Ideology: Communism; Titoism; Pensioners' rights; Yugo-nostalgia
- Political position: Left-wing to far-left
- Parliament of Montenegro: 0 / 81

Party flag
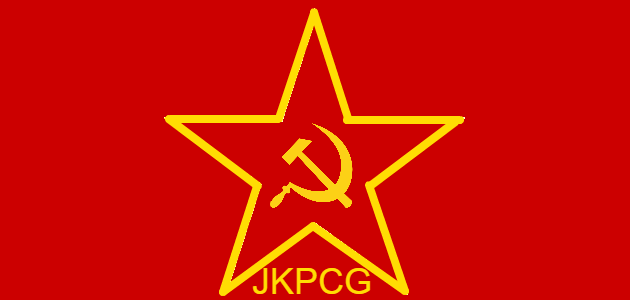

Website
- jkpcg.me

Yugoslav Communist Party of Montenegro (Serbo-Croatian: Југославенска комунистичка партија Црне Горе, Jugoslovenska komunistička partija Crne Gore, JKP CG) is a minor Titoist political party in Montenegro. The party mostly gathers pensioners, mainly with Titoistic and nostalgic feelings towards life in the former Communist Yugoslavia (SFRJ).

== History ==
The political party was founded on 25 September 2009 as a result of the merger of two political parties: League of Communists of Yugoslavia - Communists of Montenegro and Yugoslav Communists of Montenegro.

During the 2010 municipal elections, Yugoslav Communist Party of Montenegro gained 1 seat in the Municipal Parliament of Plužine.

The party participated in 2012 parliamentary elections in the coalition "Together", along with the Party of United Pensioners and the Disabled (PUPI), but did not achieve parliamentary status, winning 0.38% of votes.

In August 2016, the party joined the opposition alliance Democratic Front (DF) for the 2016 parliamentary election. Party also supported the big tent For the Future of Montenegro (ZBCG) list for the 2020 parliamentary election.

== Elections ==
=== Parliamentary election ===
Parliament of Montenegro
Year	Popular vote	% of popular vote	Overall seats won	Coalition	Government
2009	1,594	0.5%	0 / 81	—	extra-parliamentary
2012	1,384	0.3%	0 / 81	with PUPI	extra-parliamentary
2016	77,784	20.3%	0 / 81	with DF	extra-parliamentary
2020	133,267	32.5%	0 / 81	with ZBCG	extra-parliamentary
