= 2016 Montenegrin parliamentary election =

- 16 October 2016
- Turnout: 73.41% (▲2.85pp)
Party	Leader	Vote %	Seats	+/–
DPS	Milo Đukanović	41.41	36	+3
DF	Andrija Mandić	20.32	18	−2
Ključ	Miodrag Lekić	11.05	9	0
DCG	Aleksa Bečić	10.01	8	New
SDP	Ranko Krivokapić	5.23	4	−2
SD	Ivan Brajović	3.26	2	New
BS	Rafet Husović	3.16	2	−1
AO	Genci Nimanbegu	1.27	1	0
HGI	Marija Vučinović	0.47	1	0
This lists parties that won seats. See the complete results below.
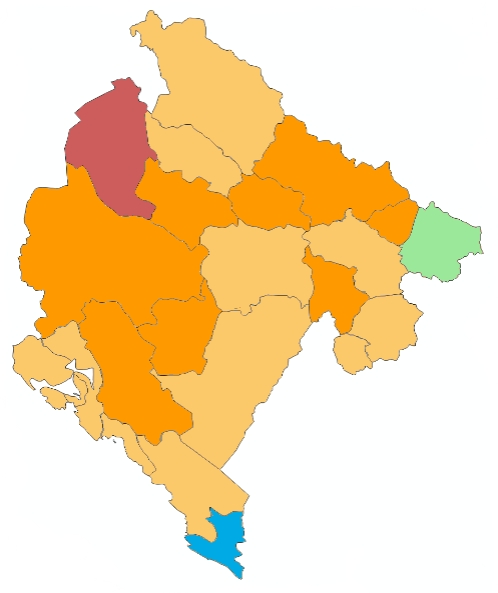
Results by municipality;
DPS Ključ BS AO
Saturation of colour denotes strength of vote
Prime Minister before	Prime Minister after
Milo Đukanović; DPS	Duško Marković; DPS

Parliamentary elections were held in Montenegro on 16 October 2016. The ruling Democratic Party of Socialists (DPS) remained the largest party, winning 36 of the 81 seats, and subsequently formed a coalition government with the new Social Democrats and national minority parties. The elections were held in the midst of an alleged coup d'état attempt.

== Background ==
Protests against incumbent Prime Minister Milo Djukanovic occurred in the preceding year over issues ranging from NATO membership to electoral fraud. A split in the ruling coalition followed in January 2016, leaving the government functioning as a de facto minority government. The provisional government of electoral trust was elected on May 12, 2016, by the parliament of Montenegro. The provisional governing coalition was formed by DPS and several opposition parties.

== Electoral system ==
The 81 seats of the Parliament of Montenegro are elected in a single nationwide constituency by closed list proportional representation. Seats are allocated using the d'Hondt method with a 3% electoral threshold.

Minority groups that account for at least 15% of the population in a district are given an exemption that lowers the electoral threshold to 0.7% for a possible total of three seats if their list fails to cross the 3% threshold.

For ethnic Croats, if no list representing the population passes the 0.7% threshold, the list with the most votes will win one seat if it receives more than 0.35% of the vote.

== Campaign ==
On 31 August 2016, the Democratic Serb Party (DSS) decided to sign an agreement with Democratic Front Alliance, as did the far-left Yugoslav Communist Party (JKP) and right-wing Democratic Party of Unity (DSJ).

The Socialist People's Party (SNP), United Reform Action (URA) and DEMOS agreed to form a pre-election alliance under the name Key Coalition, with Miodrag Lekić as leader.

On 8 September 2016 the ruling Democratic Party of Socialists (DPS) decided to run independently, with two Liberal Party (LP) representatives on their electoral list.

=== Electoral lists ===
#	List name	Leader	Note
1	Albanians Decisively - FORCA, DUA, AA	Genci Nimanbegu	^{M}
2	SDP - Ranko Krivokapić - Country for everyone!	Ranko Krivokapić	
3	Albanian Coalition with One Goal - DP, DS and Perspective	Gëzim Hajdinaga	^{M}
4	Alternative Montenegro	Vesko Pejak	
5	Positive Montenegro - Darko Pajović - Because we love Montenegro	Darko Pajović	
6	Safe step! DPS - Milo Đukanović	Milo Đukanović	
7	Croatian Civic Initiative - HGI from the heart	Marija Vučinović	^{M}
8	Mr Aleksa Bečić - Democrats - Victories, not divisions.	Aleksa Bečić	
9	Key Coalition - DEMOS, SNP, URA - The best for Montenegro!	Miodrag Lekić	
10	Serb Party - Prof. Dr. Milovan Živković	Milovan Živković	
11	Party of Pensioners, Disabled and Social Justice	Smajo Šabotić	
12	List of Democratic Alliance of Albanians	Nikola Camaj	^{M}
13	Democratic Front - Either us, or him	Andrija Mandić	
14	Bosniak Party - Rafet Husović - Our strength	Rafet Husović	^{M}
15	Bosniak Democratic Community in Montenegro - Hazbija Kalač	Hazbija Kalač	^{M}
16	Social Democrats of Montenegro - Consistently	Ivan Brajović	
17	Party of Serb Radicals - Montenegro in safe hands.	Aleksandar Janković	
Source: DIK

^{M} — National minority list

== Opinion polls ==
Poll results are listed in the table below in reverse chronological order, showing the most recent first, and using the date the survey's fieldwork was done, as opposed to the date of publication. If such date is unknown, the date of publication is given instead. The highest percentage figure in each polling survey is displayed in bold, and the background shaded in the leading party's colour. In the instance that there is a tie, then no figure is shaded. The lead column on the right shows the percentage-point difference between the two parties with the highest figures. When a specific poll does not show a data figure for a party, the party's cell corresponding to that poll is shown empty. The threshold for a party to elect members is 3%.

Date	Polling Firm/Source	DPS	SDP	DF	Key Coalition			DCG	SD	PCG	BS	Others	Lead
Date	Polling Firm/Source	DPS	SDP	DF	SNP	DEMOS	URA	DCG	SD	PCG	BS	Others	Lead
Oct 2016	Ipsos	40.9	3.1	23.2	14.0			6.8	1.9	2.6	2	5.6	17.7
Sep 2016	VKK	37.2	4.1	14.3	22.7			7.1	2.2	0.8	2.8	8.8	14.5
Jun 2016	CeDem	43.1	4.2	11.1	8.8	10.3	4.1	7.2	2.4	2.2	3.8	2.8	32
Jun 2016	NSPM	39.1	4.1	22.1	8.2	6.7	3.2	6.7	2.4	>1	2.8	5.1	17.0
Apr 2016	Ipsos	45	6	8	6	15	4	7	>1	2	2	5	30
Feb 2016	Damar	40.9	4.3	11.9	6.4	12.2	6.1	6.8	2.2	1.9	3.6	3.7	28.7
Dec 2015	Ipsos	45	4	8	6	13	8	6	>1	2	2	6	32
Nov 2015	Damar	41.7	4	11.5	6.4	11.4	4	7.4	2.4	3	4.5	3.7	30.2
Nov 2015	CeDem	45.1	4.6	8.7	9.1	10.2	4.2	6.7	2.5	1.8	3.3	3.8	34.9
Oct 2015	Ipsos	45	4	8	7	13	7	6	1	1	3	5	32
Sep 2015	Damar	40.3	3.8	9.4	6.9	10.2	3.5	10.1	2.4	3.6	5	4.8	30.1
July 2015	CeDem	42.7	5.2	5.8	8.5	14.4	5.5	9.2	2.2	1.6	2.1	2.8	28.3
May 2015	Ipsos	42	3	7	7	16	5	7	>1	2.9	3	7.1	26
**Oct 2012**	**Election results**	45.6		**22.8**	**11.1**	**Did not exist**				**8.2**	**4.1**	**8.1**	**22.8**

== Coup plot ==
A group of 20 Serbian and Montenegrin citizens were arrested on election day. Fourteen remain in custody (as of 12 November 2016), including former head of Serbian Gendarmery Bratislav Dikić, and some that fought for the pro-Russian side in the War in Donbas. On 6 November, the Montenegrin prosecutor Milivoje Katnić has stated that there is no evidence of Russian state involvement, but that two Russian nationalists organized the plot. Two GRU agents, Vladimir Popov and Eduard Shishmakov, have been tried in absentia. Russian citizens in Serbia, monitoring Prime Minister Đukanović, had been supervised by the Special prosecution, which prevented them from realizing the plan. The Serbian authorities found €125,000 in cash and uniforms, and deported an unknown number of Russian citizens. At the same time, Serbian Prime Minister Aleksandar Vučić told that there had been increased activity by a number of different intelligence agencies, 'from both the East and the West', against Serbian interests, and that members of these agencies had been apprehended. The Montenegrin prosecutor said that the intention was to have 500 people enter Montenegro on election night to "cause violence", and hire assassin snipers to murder Prime Minister Đukanović – to stop Montenegro from entering NATO and prevent Russia from losing an ally in the Balkans. All opposition parties claimed that the coup attempt was staged by the Government of Montenegro and DPS as a publicity stunt to improve their electoral results, and denounced elections as irregular, refusing to accept the results.

== Results ==
Graph of the party split among 81 seats.
Party	Votes	%	Seats	+/–
Democratic Party of Socialists of Montenegro	158,490	41.41	36	+3
Democratic Front	77,784	20.32	18	–2
Key Coalition	42,295	11.05	9	0
Democratic Montenegro	38,327	10.01	8	New
Social Democratic Party of Montenegro	20,011	5.23	4	–2
Social Democrats of Montenegro	12,472	3.26	2	New
Bosniak Party	12,089	3.16	2	–1
Positive Montenegro	5,062	1.32	0	–7
Albanians Decisively	4,854	1.27	1	0
Albanian Coalition	3,394	0.89	0	–1
Croatian Civic Initiative	1,802	0.47	1	0
Democratic Alliance of Albanians	1,542	0.40	0	New
Serb Party	1,201	0.31	0	New
Bosniak Democratic Community in Montenegro	1,140	0.30	0	New
Alternative Montenegro	878	0.23	0	New
Party of Serb Radicals	693	0.18	0	0
Party of United Pensioners and the Disabled	672	0.18	0	0
Total	382,706	100.00	81	0
Valid votes	382,706	98.58		
Invalid/blank votes	5,513	1.42		
Total votes	388,219	100.00		
Registered voters/turnout	528,817	73.41		
Source: DIK

== Aftermath ==
Following the elections, all 39 opposition MPs boycotted Parliament from its opening due to claims of electoral fraud and the elections not being held under fair conditions. In mid-February 2017, the opposition announced it would also boycott local elections in the country's second largest municipality, Nikšić, over the government's attempt to prosecute two members of Parliament, Andrija Mandić and Milan Knežević from the right-wing opposition Democratic Front alliance, who had been charged with involvement in a coup plot allegedly planned for election day.

On 9 November 2016, Deputy Prime Minister Duško Marković in Đukanović VI Cabinet (2012-2016) was nominated as new Prime Minister by the president of Montenegro Filip Vujanović, and on 28 November new government was elected by 41 out of 81 members of the parliament (with the entire opposition boycotting the assembly), with the support of Democratic Party of Socialists, Social Democrats of Montenegro and the Bosniak, Albanian and Croatian minority parties.
