= Vladimir Pavićević =

Montenegrin and Serbian politician

Vladimir Pavićević Владимир Павићевић
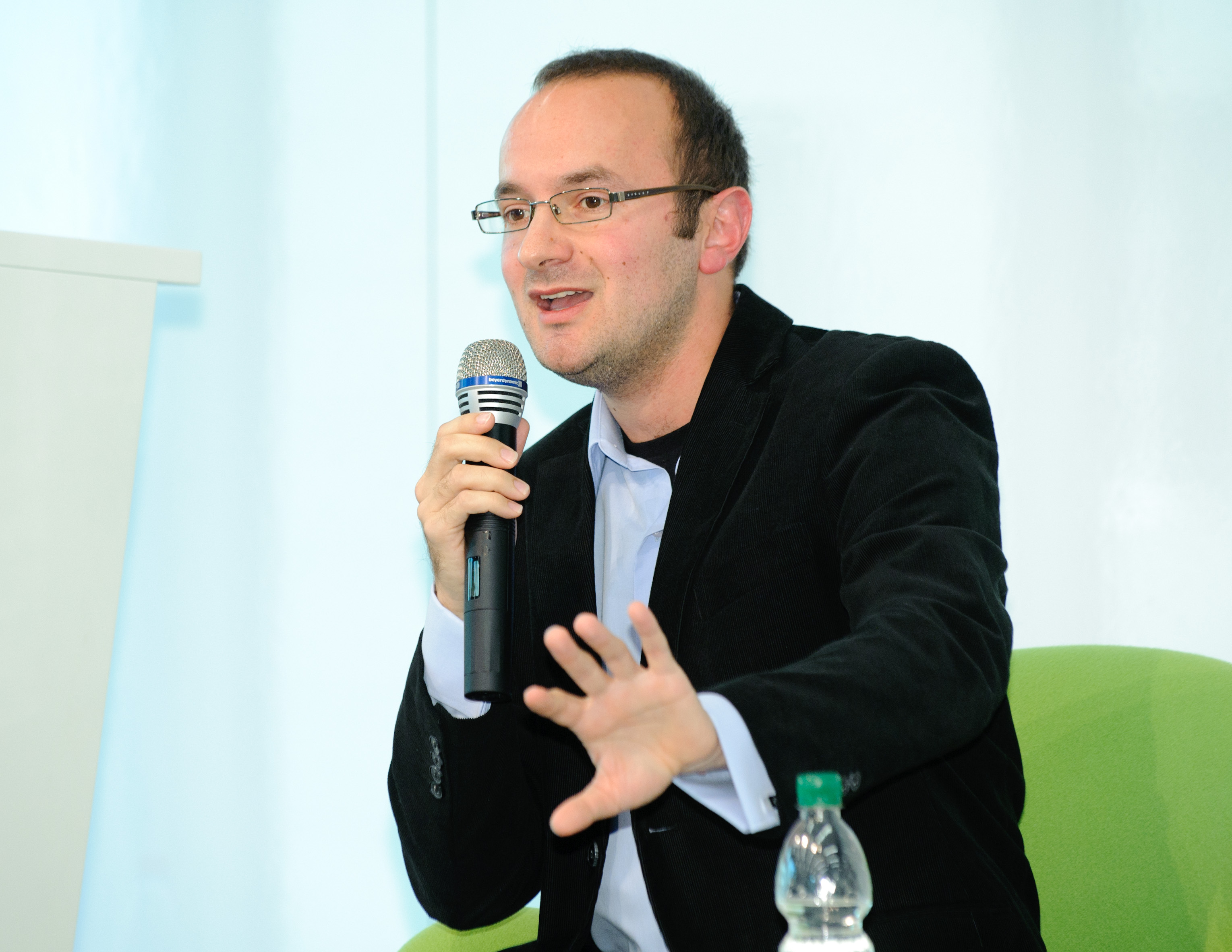

Member of Parliament of Serbia
- In office 16 March 2014 – 24 April 2016

Personal details
- Born: 4 January 1978 (age 48) Kotor, SFR Yugoslavia
- Party: Independent (2008–2013, 2020–present)
- Other political affiliations: Democrats (2019–2021); Montenegrin (2017–2020); New Party (2013–2017); Liberal Democratic (2008)
- Education: University of Belgrade; University of Bonn

Vladimir Pavićević (Serbian Cyrillic: Владимир Павићевић; born in Kotor in 1978) is a Montenegrin and Serbian political theorist, activist and analyst, former professor at the University of Belgrade and Member of Parliament of Serbia from 2014 until 2016. He was one of the founders and former deputy president of the liberal New Party in Serbia, and was the former president of the political party named the Montenegrin from 2018 until his resignation in 2020. He is currently active as director of NGO "Policy Research Society" (Društvo za istraživanje politike i političke teorije), as well as political talk show host at Montenegrin Adria TV.

== Biography ==
Pavićević graduated from the Faculty of Political Sciences at the University of Belgrade in 2000 and obtained a master's degree in 2004 at University of Bonn. He received adoctoral degree in 2011 at the University of Belgrade. Since 2011, he was the President of the Research Forum of the European Movement in Serbia and academic advisor at the Belgrade Open School, since 2012.

== Political career ==
=== Serbia ===
In April 2013, at the founding conference, he was elected vice president of the New Party. On 5 October 2013, on the proposal of the party president Zoran Živković, he was elected party deputy president. At 2014 parliamentary election he became one of two party parliamentary representatives together with party leader Živković. Even though he was the most active MP in the 10th assembly of Serbian parliament, he was not re-elected at 2016 parliamentary election.

=== Montenegro ===
In 2017 he decided to leave the party and Belgrade, Serbia and move back to his native country, Montenegro, where he assumed the position of political adviser in the newly formed liberal political party the Montenegrin. At the party second congress on 27 January 2018 he was elected new President of the party. During his leadership the party was in close relations with opposition Democratic Montenegro (Democrats), which sparked criticism of part of party members. He was part of 2019 Montenegrin anti-corruption protests. On 28 January 2020 at the height of the political crisis in Montenegro, Pavićević announced he was leaving the party, following ideological disagreements with party membership. After leaving the party, he continues to work closely with the Democratic Montenegro and its leader Aleksa Bečić.
