= Montenegrin (party) =

Montenegrin Crnogorska Црногорска
- Founders: Miodrag Vlahović; Miodrag Živković
- Founded: 14 June 2014
- Dissolved: September 2021
- Merged into: Civil Initiative "21 of May"
- Headquarters: Cetinje
- Ideology: National liberalism Montenegrin nationalism Pro-Europeanism; Historically (2018-2020); Economic liberalism Social liberalism Constitutional patriotism
- Political position: Centre-right

Website
- crnogorska.me

Montenegrin (Montenegrin: Црногорска / Crnogorska; CG) was a minor national liberal political party in Montenegro, founded in 2017 as the successor to Montenegrin Democratic Union (CDU). The party had no seats in the Parliament of Montenegro, and never contest the national-level parliamentary election. It had 3 members of the Budva local parliament, elected in 2020 from the DPS-led list.

== History ==
Miodrag Vlahović, founder and first president of CDU, resigned and was succeeded by Dragan Ivančević, whose election was followed by the rebranding of the party. Some notable members of the party, such as leader Ivančević and president of Political Council, Miodrag Živković, are former members of the Liberal Party of Montenegro and Liberal Alliance of Montenegro. The party is non-parliamentary, since its foundation as the CDU, and its greatest achievement has been winning 3 seats in Budva local parliament at the 2016 local elections.

In 2018, Vladimir Pavićević was elected as the new party leader. During Pavicević's leadership the party was in close relations with opposition Democratic Montenegro (Democrats), which sparked criticism of part of party members.

On 28 January 2020 at the height of the political crisis in Montenegro, Pavićević announced he was leaving the party, following ideological disagreements with party membership, many local committees collectively leave the party and join the Democrats. After Pavićević's departure, the party is increasingly returning to the nationalist discourse, as well supporting the policies of the DPS-led government and President Đukanović, which led to the crisis of the Budva local coalition government, and the removal of the previous opposition-led local authorities, which was accompanied by arrests, police brutality and violence against local government officials and its supporters, as well the return of the DPS to local government in Budva.

The party ran at the 2020 local elections in Budva as part of the list of the ruling DPS. After the victory of the opposition at the August 2020 parliamentary elections, and the fall of the DPS from the position of power after 30 years of rule, Party leader openly called the new parliamentary big tent majority "enemies of Montenegro". At 30 October 2020, on the occasion of the news of the death of the head of the Metropolitanate of Montenegro and the Serbian Orthodox Church in Montenegro, Amfilohije (Radović), said "it's refreshing", which caused resentment and controversy in the Montenegrin public.

== See also ==
- Liberalism in Montenegro
- Montenegrin nationalism
