= Democratic Montenegro =

Montenegrin political party

Democratic Montenegro Demokratska Crna Gora Демократска Црна Гора
- Leader: Aleksa Bečić
- Founded: 19 April 2015
- Split from: SNP
- Headquarters: Podgorica
- Ideology: Conservative liberalism; Populism; Pro-Europeanism
- Political position: Centre to centre-right
- National affiliation: Count Bravely! (2023)
- European affiliation: EPP (PACE)
- Colours: Red Orange
- Parliament: 7 / 81
- Mayors: 3 / 25
- Local Parliaments: 93 / 844

Website
- demokrate.me

Democratic Montenegro (Montenegrin: Demokratska Crna Gora / Демократска Црна Гора), also known as the Democrats (Demokrate / Демократе), is a conservative liberal, centrist, populist and pro-European political party in Montenegro. Democrats currently has seven MPs in the Parliament of Montenegro, elected in June 2023, from the big tent Peace is Our Nation (MNN) electoral list. Its founder and current leader is Aleksa Bečić, former President of the Parliament. He founded the centrist pro-European party in April 2015 after splitting from the Socialist People's Party (SNP).

== History ==
The Democratic Montenegro was formed in 2015 when the faction of Socialist People's Party split and formed a new political party, represented by 2 MPs in the Parliament of Montenegro.

The Democrats increased their number of MPs from 2 to 8 in the October 2016 parliamentary election and after the local elections held the same year, the party gained mayoral positions in Budva and Kotor municipalities. At the local elections held in Herceg Novi in May 2017 the party won 9 out of 34 seats, leading the opposition coalition which formed the local government. Since the constitution the new parliament the entire opposition (all 39 MPs out of 81 in total) started a collective boycott of all parliamentary sittings, due to claims of electoral fraud at the 2016 parliamentary elections, Democratic Montenegro MPs remained in a boycott with the same demands until the end of the term.

In March 2018, Democrats decides to support the candidacy of independent candidate Mladen Bojanić to run for president of Montenegro at April 2018 presidential election, as did Democratic Front (DF), Socialist People's Party (SNP), United Reform Action (URA) and United Montenegro (UCG). At the election, Bojanić came second, behind Milo Đukanović, with 33.40% of the vote. In the 2018 local elections, Democrats formed an electoral coalition with the United Reform Action in a number of municipalities. After elections Democrats become part of the local government only in Berane, forming an post-election coalition with DF and SNP, remaining opposition in the rest of the municipalities.

In July 2020, Democratic Montenegro decided to enter the big tent Peace is Our Nation (Mir je naša nacija) coalition with Demos, New Left and PUPI, as well some independent candidates, such as liberal politician Vladimir Pavićević, former leader of the Montenegrin, in order to participate at the forthcoming August 2020 parliamentary election. On 23 September, 41 deputies of the three lists of the new majority in parliament (Peace is Our Nation, For the Future of Montenegro and the United Reform Action) elected Democrats leader Bečić as the new President of the Parliament of Montenegro, 4 deputies from minority parties (3 from the Bosniak Party and 1 from Albanian Alternative) also voted for his election.

== Electoral performance ==
=== Parliamentary elections ===
Election	Party leader	Performance				Alliance	Government
Election	Party leader	Votes	%	Seats	+/–	Alliance	Government
2016	Aleksa Bečić	38,327	10.01%	8 / 81	New	—	Opposition
2020	Aleksa Bečić	51,298	12.53%	9 / 81	▲1	MNN	Support 2020–22
2020	Aleksa Bečić	51,298	12.53%	9 / 81	▲1	MNN	Opposition 2022–23
2023	Aleksa Bečić	37,730	12.48%	7 / 81	▼2	HSB	Government

=== Presidential elections ===
President of Montenegro
Election	Candidate	1st round		2nd round		Result
Election	Candidate	Votes	%	Votes	%	Result
2018 (Note: Supported Mladen Bojanić as independent candidate.)	Mladen Bojanić	111,711	33.40	—N/a		Lost ✗
2023	Aleksa Bečić	37,563	11.10	Supported Jakov Milatović		

== Positions held ==
Major positions held by the Democratic Montenegro members:

President of the Parliament of Montenegro	Years
Aleksa Bečić	2020–2022
