= Aleksa Bečić =

Montenegrin politician (born 1987)

- Алекса Бечић
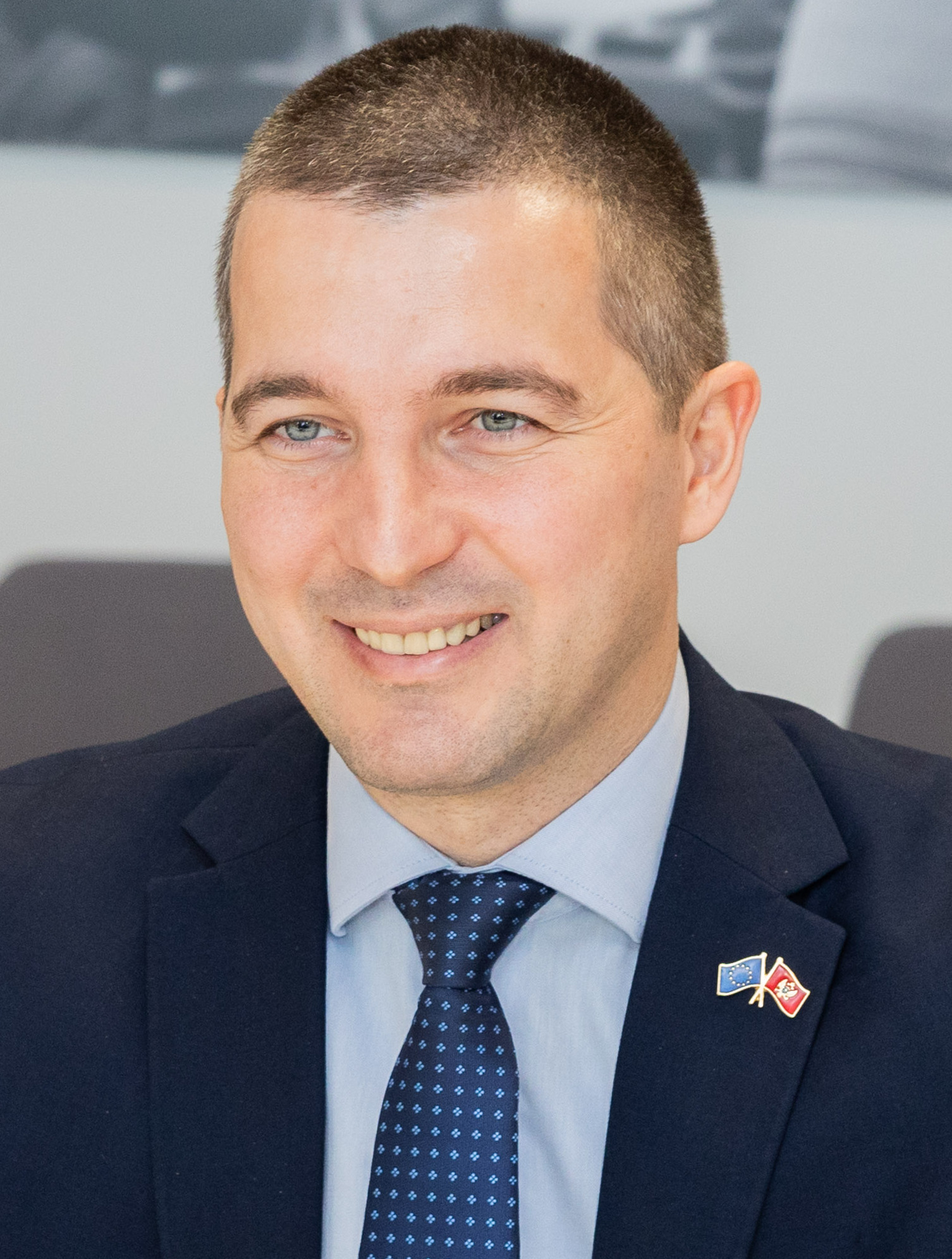
- Bečić in 2024

Deputy Prime Minister for Security, Internal and European Policy
- Incumbent
- Assumed office 31 October 2023
- Prime Minister: Milojko Spajić

President of the Parliament of Montenegro
- In office 23 September 2020 – 7 February 2022
- Preceded by: Miodrag Lekić (acting); Ivan Brajović
- Succeeded by: Strahinja Bulajić (acting); Danijela Đurović

Member of Parliament
- In office 16 October 2016 – 31 October 2023
- President: Ivan Brajović

Personal details
- Born: 4 August 1987 (age 39) Cetinje, SR Montenegro, SFR Yugoslavia
- Party: Democratic Montenegro (2015–present)
- Other political affiliations: Aleksa and Dritan – Count Bravely! (2023); Peace is Our Nation; (2020–2023); Socialist People's Party; (2010–2015)
- Education: University of Montenegro
- Profession: Politician

Aleksa Bečić (Montenegrin Cyrillic: Алекса Бечић; born 4 August 1987) is a Montenegrin politician, current Deputy Prime Minister of Montenegro since 2023, who served as the president of the Parliament from 2020 until 2022. He is the founder and current president of the centrist political party Democratic Montenegro.

== Early life and education ==
Bečić was born in Cetinje, Montenegrin Old Royal Capital, at that time part of the Socialist Republic of Montenegro of SFR Yugoslavia. Having finished elementary and secondary school of Economics in Podgorica, Bečić graduated at the Faculty of Economics at the University of Montenegro. He obtained a master's degree in 2014. For fifteen years he was actively involved in football. He won two cups of Montenegro in the senior competition and is a former member of the Montenegrin national team in the junior categories.

== Political career ==
He led the Socialist People's Party electoral list in the Podgorica local election of May 2014 under the slogan "youth, wisdom and courage". In 2015 he became one of the founders of the Democratic Montenegro Party, when the faction of the Socialist People's Party of Montenegro defected from the political party, and formed new political subject, represented by 2 MPs in the Parliament of Montenegro. A newly formed party ran independently at the 2016 parliamentary election under the slogan "Victories, not divisions", increased their number of MPs from 2 to 9 and becoming one of main opposition parties in Montenegrin Parliament. Since the constitution the new parliament the entire opposition (all 39 MPs out of 81 in total) started a collective boycott of all parliamentary sittings, due to claims of electoral fraud at the 2016 parliamentary elections, Bečić along the other Democratic Montenegro MPs remained in a boycott with the same demands until the end of the term.

In 2020, Bečić led the centrist Peace is Our Nation electoral list in the parliamentary election in August, by forming an alliance with Miodrag Lekić's DEMOS, as well some minor parties and independent politicians, such as Vladimir Pavićević, former leader of the liberal Montenegrin party. The coalition eventually won 10 seats, 9 of which went to Bečić's Democrats. On September 23, all 41 deputies of the three coalitions of the new majority in parliament officially supported Zdravko Krivokapić as the new prime minister-designate, as well electing Bečić new President of the Parliament of Montenegro.

On 5 October 2020, Bečić, along with the European Union Ambassador to Montenegro Oriana Christina Popa opened the new War Crimes Documentation Centre in the capital Podgorica, stressing that the country must face up to its wartime past.

On 1 November 2020, Bečić, as the believer of the Metropolitanate of Montenegro and the Littoral, as well as the head of the Montenegrin Parliament, was selected one of speakers at the funeral of Metropolitan of Montenegro Amfilohije, in the Cathedral of the Resurrection of Christ in Podgorica, along with Serbian Patriarch Irinej, Bishop of Budimlja and Nikšić Joanikije, Serbian poet and academic, Matija Bećković and Prime Minister-designate of Montenegro, Zdravko Krivokapić.

=== Allegations of plagiarism ===
In 2018, Bečić faced intense public scrutiny, as a research study conducted by NGO Center for Public Integrity accused him of plagiarising significant portions of his Master thesis from various online sources. Bečić had repeatedly denied these allegations, calling it a coordinated smear campaign jointly conducted by parts of the DF and the ruling DPS.

=== Persona non grata declaration ===
On 25 July 2024, Bečić, along with parliamentary speaker Andrija Mandić and MP Milan Knežević were declared persona non grata by Croatia following the passage of a resolution in the Parliament of Montenegro recognising a genocide in the Jasenovac concentration camp committed by the pro-Axis Independent State of Croatia during World War II.

== Identity and views ==
Bečić never stated how he declares himself by ethnicity, and when he was asked what language he speaks in the show Questionnaire on RTS, he said: "Hey, in Montenegro ... let me tell you, I did not come here today as a citizen of Montenegro. Today, I am the president of a political party that brings together people of all faiths and nations and that has managed to bring together and reconcile people who were divided in the previous period and who had different ideological determinants." He finally stated in a parliamentary session in 2022 that he is Montenegrin and speaks Serbian.

For a long time, he did not say whether he supported the Serbian Orthodox Metropolitanate of Montenegro and the Littoral or the Montenegrin Orthodox Church. However, at the end of 2019, he opposed the controversial Law on Freedom of Religion and participated in the religious protests organized by the Metropolitanate, stating that the law must be in accordance with all three traditional denominations, also accusing the ruling party of inciting ethnic hatred and unrest. At the time of Montenegro's recognition of Kosovo's independence in 2008, he expressed "a form of dissatisfaction with the circumstances surrounding the decision", while in 2017 he said he did not want to regulate "Serbia-Kosovo interstate relations" and that the question of Kosovo's independence should be to let young people out of the clutches of Balkan primitivism ".
