= Social Democrats of Montenegro =

Montenegrin political party

Social Democrats of Montenegro Socijaldemokrate Crne Gore Социјалдемократе Црне Горе
- Abbreviation: SD
- Leader: Damir Šehović
- President: Ivan Brajović
- General Secretary: Danilo Mirotić
- Founders: Ivan Brajović; Vujica Lazović
- Founded: 31 July 2015
- Split from: Social Democratic Party
- Headquarters: Podgorica
- Ideology: Social democracy Populism; Pro-Europeanism; Social liberalism
- Political position: Centre-left
- National affiliation: Together! For the Future that Belongs to You (2023); European Alliance (since 2024)
- Colours: Red and white
- Parliament: 3 / 81
- Mayors: 1 / 25
- Local Parliaments: 41 / 844

Website
- sdcg.me

The Social Democrats of Montenegro (Montenegrin: Socijaldemokrate Crne Gore / Социјалдемократе Црне Горе, SD CG), also known as the Social Democrats (Montenegrin: Socijaldemokrate, Социјалдемократe, SD), is a centre-left political party in Montenegro formed in 2015 by a split faction of the SDP.

== History ==
The party was founded in July 2015 after the split between two Social Democratic Party (SDP) vice-presidents Vujica Lazović and Ivan Brajović, that advocated unconditional support for the ruling Democratic Party of Socialists (DPS) and Prime Minister Milo Đukanović, with the party leader Ranko Krivokapić, who advocated pursuing an independent political course. Brajović, Minister of Transport and Maritime Affairs in the Government of Montenegro at the time, was chosen as the first president of the new party. After the 2016 parliamentary election, the party having won two seats in the Parliament of Montenegro, remain part of the government with two ministers while the Party leader Brajović was elected President of the Parliament of Montenegro. Following the 2020 parliamentary elections, the party gained one seat, bringing its total to three, but was not part of the formed government coalition, going into opposition, together with its coalition partner, the DPS, which has been in power in Montenegro since the introduction of the multi-party system in 1990.

On 30 January 2022, the Social Democrats elected a new president of the party, Damir Šehović, the former Minister of Education, replacing the former party president Ivan Brajović, who did not apply for a second term. The party won three seats in the 2023 Montenegrin parliamentary election as a part of the DPS-led Together! alliance. In 2024, the Social Democrats founded the European Alliance together with the Social Democratic Party of Montenegro.

== Elections ==
=== Parliamentary elections ===
Election	Party leader	Performance				Alliance	Government
Election	Party leader	Votes	%	Seats	+/–	Alliance	Government
2015	Ivan Brajović	Split from SDP		3 / 81	New	-	Government
2016	Ivan Brajović	12,472	3.26%	2 / 81	▼1	-	Government
2020	Ivan Brajović	16,769	4.10%	3 / 81	▲1	-	Opposition
2023	Damir Šehović	70,228	23.26%	3 / 81	0	With DPS-LP	Opposition

=== Presidential elections ===
President of Montenegro
Election year	Candidate	#	1st round votes	%	#	2nd round votes	%	Note
2018	Milo Đukanović	1st	180,274	53.90%	—N/a	—	—	DPS, support

== Positions held ==
Major positions held by Social Democrats of Montenegro members:

President of the Parliament of Montenegro	Years
Ivan Brajović	2016–2020
