= DEMOS (Montenegro) =

Montenegrin political party

DEMOS ДЕМОС
- Leader: Ksenija Milović
- Founded: 18 March 2015
- Split from: Democratic Front
- Headquarters: Podgorica
- Ideology: Liberal conservatism; Centrism; Pro-Europeanism
- Political position: Centre to centre-right
- National affiliation: Peace is Our Nation (2020–2023)
- Colours: blue, yellow and dark red
- Slogan: The right to a future
- Parliament: 0 / 81
- Mayors: 0 / 25
- Local Parliaments: 0 / 844

Website
- demos.co.me

DEMOS (acronym of Demokratski savez, lit. 'Democratic Alliance'; Montenegrin: Демократски савез, ДЕМОС) is a centrist to centre-right political party in Montenegro. Party founder and current leader is Miodrag Lekić, who was also the party's single MP in the Parliament of Montenegro until 2023.

== History ==
Party was founded in 2015 when Miodrag Lekić, leader of the opposition Democratic Front, split from the alliance due to disagreements with its constituent parties, and formed the new moderate right political subject.

In September 2016, DEMOS decided to enter the Key Coalition with URA and SNP in order to participate at the forthcoming parliamentary election, winning four parliamentary seats. In the summer of 2017 a rift occurred within the party, which resulted in a split, with a conservative faction led by Goran Danilović and Goran Radonjić deciding to form a new party, called United Montenegro. The split left Demos with two MPs, as the remaining two defected to the new party.

In July 2020, Demos decided to enter the big tent Peace is Our Nation coalition with Democratic Montenegro, as well some minor parties and independent candidates, in order to participate in the August 2020 elections.

== Electoral performance ==
=== Presidential elections ===
President of Montenegro
Election year	#	Candidate	1st round vote	%	2nd round vote	%	Note
2018	3rd	Draginja Vuksanović	27,441	8.20%	—	—	SDP, support

=== Parliamentary elections ===
Election	Party leader	Performance				Alliance	Government
Election	Party leader	Votes	%	Seats	+/–	Alliance	Government
2016	Miodrag Lekić	42,295	11.05%	4 / 81	New	Ključ	Opposition
2020	Miodrag Lekić	51,298	12.53%	1 / 81	▼3	MNN	Support 2020–22
2020	Miodrag Lekić	51,298	12.53%	1 / 81	▼3	MNN	Opposition 2022–23
2023	Miodrag Lekić	9,472	3.13%	0 / 81	▼1	SNP-Demos	Extra-parliamentary
