= Liberal Party of Montenegro =

Political party in Montenegro

Liberal Party of Montenegro Либерална партија Црне Горе Liberalna partija Crne Gore
- President: Vatroslav Belan
- Presidium: Aleksandar Ljumović; Ammar Borančić
- Founder: Miodrag Živković
- Founded: 2004
- Split from: Liberal Alliance
- Headquarters: Podgorica
- Youth wing: Liberal Youth of Montenegro
- Ideology: Liberalism; Social liberalism; Pro-Europeanism; Factions: National liberalism; Secularism
- Political position: Centre
- National affiliation: European Montenegro (2012–2016); European Alliance (since 2024)
- Regional affiliation: Liberal South East European Network
- European affiliation: Alliance of Liberals and Democrats for Europe (associate)
- International affiliation: Liberal International
- Colours: Blue
- Parliament: 0 / 81
- Mayors: 0 / 25
- Local Parliaments: 4 / 844

Website
- www.lpcg.me

Liberal Party of Montenegro (Montenegrin: Либерална партија Црне Горе, romanized: Liberalna partija Crne Gore, LP) is a liberal and nationalist political party in Montenegro.

Initially, the party advocated liberalism and the bringing down of Milo Đukanović's rule, saw it as authoritarian and undemocratic. It had continued the fight against what it saw as the DPS' authoritarianism that the Liberal Alliance of Montenegro pursued since its foundation in 1990. However, the party changed its discourse and became a junior coalition partner of DPS both on local and national level since 2006, when Đukanović's regime declared independence of Montenegro.

Currently, LP president Andrija Popović is the party's sole representative in the parliament, where LP is a part of the ruling majority. The party did not contest the latest parliamentary election but delegated two candidates to the electoral list of DPS, one of which was elected to the Parliament. Currently, LP is part of the parliamentary group with another minor ruling coalition partner, SD CG. It is a member of the Liberal International and an associate member of the Alliance of Liberals and Democrats for Europe.

New Liberal Party President elected at VI Party Conference 2023. is Vatroslav Belan.

== Ideology ==
Liberal party of Montenegro is a civic, liberal and secular party. During the 2012 pre-election program, the Liberal Party advocated for legal decriminalization of marijuana, legalizing prostitution and advocated LGBT rights. The party strongly supports the membership of Montenegro in the EU and NATO. However, since 2012 the LP is strongly linked with the ruling DPS, and often does not pursue individual political goals while in the coalition government.

In recent years, the Liberal Party of Montenegro has increasingly employed a more ethnic nationalist, as well more conservative discourse, steady supporting the rights of the canonical unrecognized Montenegrin Orthodox Church, as well advocating for the rehabilitation of some pro-Axis collaborationist organizations and controversial political figures from World War II, such as Montenegrin Greens, Sekula Drljević and Savić Marković Štedimlija. After the fall of the DPS populist regime from the position of power after 30 years, in the aftermath of the 2020 parliamentary election, the party claimed that the new big tent ruling coalition "wants to assimilate ethnic Montenegrins and make them Serbs". Also expressing concern due to the alleged "threat for Montenegrin statehood and independence", in case the DPS falls from a position of power.

== History ==
The Liberal Party of Montenegro was founded on 28 October 2004 in Podgorica. It emerged from a faction of Liberal Alliance of Montenegro (LSCG), after a split between LSCG's leaders Miodrag Živković and Slavko Perović, and the expulsion of Živković faction due to serious corruption allegations, known in Montenegro as Trsteno Affair (sr). On 24 March 2005, Liberal Alliance of Montenegro decided to freeze its political activities. In 2006 Montenegrin independence referendum, LP aligned itself with pro-independence movement, consisting of Democratic Party of Socialists of Montenegro, Social Democratic Party of Montenegro and parties representing ethnic minorities. Liberal Party of Montenegro supports Montenegrin Orthodox Church, which claims to be the sole legitimate representative of Orthodox Christianity in Montenegro. At the 2012 parliamentary elections LP participated in coalition European Montenegro, which won the election, receiving one seat in the Parliament. Due to internal disagreements, Liberal Party froze its membership in the Coalition for European Montenegro, and is acting in the Parliament in the group with the minority parties (Croatian and Albanian minority representatives). However, this change has been only formal, because the minority group is also an integral part of the ruling majority with Democratic Party of Socialists.

At the 2016 and 2020 parliamentary elections, LP did not run, but instead was given two candidate spots on the electoral list of the DPS, one of which was elected to the Parliament, both times place belonged to the party leader, Andrija Popović.

== Electoral performance ==
=== Parliamentary elections ===
Election	Party leader	Performance				Alliance	Government
Election	Party leader	Votes	%	Seats	+/–	Alliance	Government
2006	Miodrag Živković	12,748	3.76%	2 / 81	New	LP-BS	Opposition
2009	Andrija Popović	8,759	2.7%	0 / 81	▼2	LP-DC	Extra-parliamentary
2012	Andrija Popović	165,380	45.60%	1 / 81	▲1	ECG	Support
2016	Andrija Popović	158,490	41.41%	1 / 81	0	with DPS	Support
2020	Andrija Popović	143,515	35.06%	1 / 81	0	with DPS	Opposition 2020–22
2020	Andrija Popović	143,515	35.06%	1 / 81	0	with DPS	Support 2022
2020	Andrija Popović	143,515	35.06%	1 / 81	0	with DPS	Opposition 2022–23
2023	Andrija Popović	70,228	23.22%	0 / 81	▼1	with DPS-SD	Extra-parliamentary

== See also ==
- Montenegrin nationalism
- Liberalism in Montenegro
