= 2023 Montenegrin presidential election =

- 19 March 2023 (first round); 2 April 2023 (second round)
- Registered: 542,154
- Turnout: 64.07% (first round) ▲0.15pp 70.14% (second round) ▲6.07pp
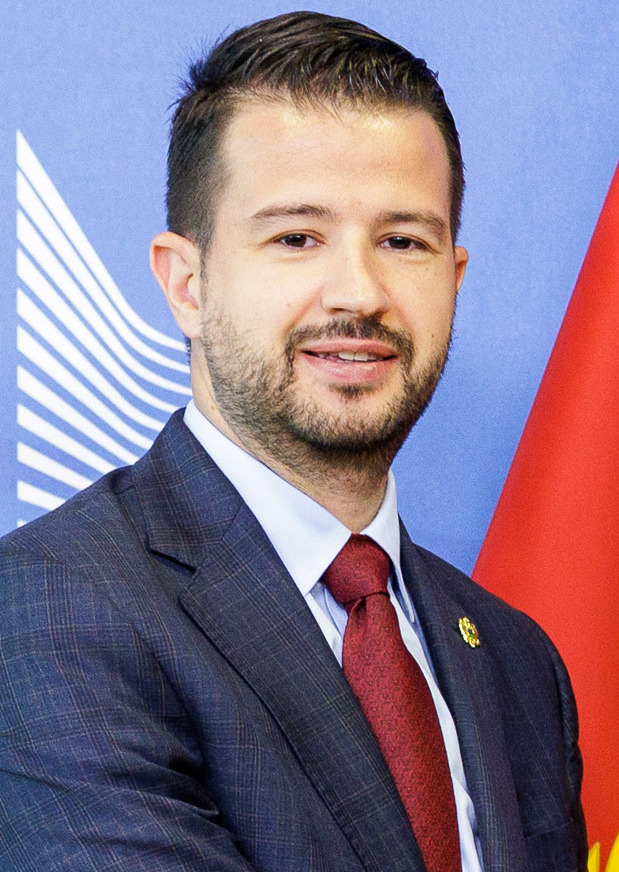

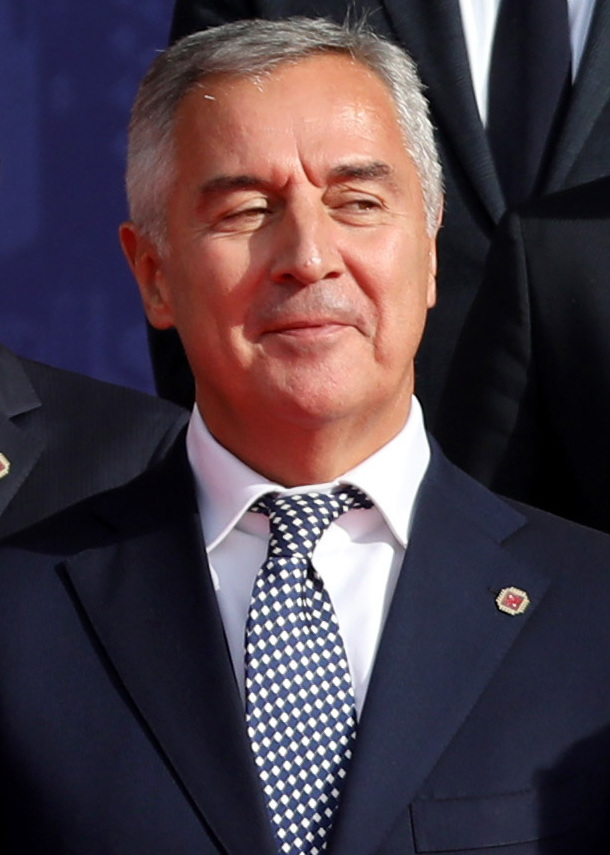
| Candidate | Jakov Milatović | Milo Đukanović |
| Party | PES! | DPS |
| Popular vote | 221,592 | 154,769 |
| Percentage | 58.88% | 41.12% |
- Đukanović Milatović Mandić Milatović Đukanović
President before election
Milo Đukanović
DPS
Elected President
Jakov Milatović
PES!

Presidential elections were held in Montenegro on 19 March 2023. Long-ruling incumbent president Milo Đukanović was eligible for re-election. Since no candidate received a majority of the vote, a second round vote was held on 2 April. In the first round, Đukanović, leader of the populist DPS, received 35%, coming first. Jakov Milatović, candidate of the newly formed centrist Europe Now! movement, running on an anti-corruption platform, outperformed the polls, gaining 29% of the votes and faced Đukanović in the second round. Andrija Mandić, one of the leaders of the right-wing populist DF secured 19% of the votes, finishing third in the first round. The second round runoff resulted in Milatović defeating Milo Đukanović in a landslide, becoming the first elected president not being a member of the Đukanović's DPS since introduction of the multi-party system in 1990, winning roughly 60% of the popular vote. It was the first time a runoff vote was held since the 1997 election, making it first presidential runoff since Montenegro gained independence in 2006, also the first election since 1997 where an incumbent president actively seeking reelection was denied a second term.

The presidential election was followed by the 2023 Montenegrin parliamentary election, held on 11 June 2023. The Europe Now! movement won a plurality of seats while the DPS led Together! coalition came in second after losing seats.

== Background ==
Milo Đukanović, the leader of the Democratic Party of Socialists (DPS), ruled Montenegro for more than three decades either as prime minister or as president. Although seen as pro-Western, during his lengthy time in power he has been involved in numerous corruption scandals and affairs, and many wanted to see him out of politics. The previous presidential election held in 2018 was won by Đukanović, with 53.9% of the vote in the first round. The incumbent president, Đukanović was eligible for re-election in 2023, since his first presidential term (1998–2003) was served before the successful 2006 Montenegrin independence referendum.

The 2023 Presidential election was held amid the deepest political crisis Montenegro has faced since its independence from Serbia in 2006. The desire to oust long-ruling Đukanović and DPS brought together three ideologically diverse opposition alliances, varying from conservative and pro-Russian to pro-Western and civic, who tightly won the 2020 parliamentary election to form the first ruling coalition that excluded DPS. However, their coalition was marred with instability, and the government led by Zdravko Krivokapić fell in February 2022, to be replaced by a short-lived minority government of Dritan Abazović which lasted until August 2022. Parliamentary crisis resulted in vacancy or caretaker status of several major state institutions, including the caretaker status of government cabinet and state prosecution and, most notably, vacancy in the Constitutional Court. As the anti-DPS parliamentary majority fractured, Đukanović and his party were widely expected to return to the power.

Several candidates ran in opposition to Đukanović: Jakov Milatović was an independent member of the technocratic cabinet, while Andrija Mandić's right-wing populist Democratic Front was among the parties that backed it in the parliament. Apart from the strong desire to remove the DPS and its leader from power, the members of the coalition had little in common and were unable to carry out reforms. Local elections held in several municipalities during 2021 and 2022 showed that DPS was losing popular support. The loss of the DPS' majority in the capital city Podgorica was seen as a punishment for Đukanovićs rather counter-productive role in the ongoing political crisis in the country. Elections were held as the country is gripped by a year-long political deadlock marked by no-confidence votes in two separate governments and a row between parliamentary majority and Đukanović over appointing a new prime minister-designate. According to media outlets, Đukanović, Milatović, and Mandić were seen as the strongest of the seven candidates, and the only ones with a real chance of getting to the second round runoff. While the office of president is largely ceremonial in Montenegro, the 2023 presidential election was seen by many as barometer for the upcoming snap parliamentary elections, which Đukanović scheduled for June 2023, dissolving the parliament few days before the first round of presidential elections in which he ran for his third term as head of state.

== Electoral system ==
The president of Montenegro is elected using the two-round system; if no candidate receives a majority of the vote in the first round, a runoff is held two weeks later. A new president is elected every five years, and only is eligible for two terms. In order to submit their candidacy to the State Electoral Commission, potential candidates need to collect 8,101 signatures.

== Campaign ==
=== First round ===
The incumbent president Milo Đukanović, who is also leader of the largest parliamentary party DPS, was eligible for re-election. Neither Đukanović nor his party announced to the public whether he planned to run in the elections, while Đukanović ultimately did not announce his candidacy until 24 February, two days before the deadline for submission of candidacies. Previously, the potential candidacy of the outgoing mayor of Podgorica, Ivan Vuković, and former prime minister Duško Marković was also advocated within the Đukanović's party. After a series of unsuccessful attempts to nominate a common candidate with DPS and the other parties within the self-labelled sovereignist bloc, on 9 February the Social Democratic Party (SDP) decided to nominate its candidate, MP Draginja Vuksanović, who was already the party's candidate in the previous elections when she unexpectedly won over 8% of voter support. The SDP initially advocated joint support for the candidacy of Milica Pejanović-Đurišić, the ambassador of Montenegro to the United Nations, or some other non-compromised independent candidate, while the minor LP and SD parties were ready to unconditionally support the candidate selected by the DPS. The presidential elections were preceded by the 2022 Montenegrin local elections, which resulted in poor results for Đukanović's party, losing power in 11 of the 14 municipalities where the elections were held, including in the capital Podgorica, for the first time since the 1990s. Đukanović's DPS also lost the mayoral posts in the vast majority of municipalities in the local elections of 2020, 2021, and 2022 for the first time since its foundation, which was accompanied by a drop in the party's popular support; this is why many of the upcoming elections were called the "most uncertain since Montenegrin independence".

A member of the ruling coalition, the SNP initially proposed the leader of the DEMOS and the candidate in the 2013 Montenegrin presidential election, Miodrag Lekić, as the joint candidate of the parties of the parliamentary majority, which the other parties eventually refused. At the end of January, the right-wing populist Democratic Front (DF) announced that it would nominate its informal leader Andrija Mandić, who was a candidate back in the 2008 Montenegrin presidential election. In February, the SNP decided to support the candidacy of Mandić, abandoning the proposal to run with their own candidate, while Democratic Montenegro (DCG) initially called for common candidate of self-labeled centrist bloc along with United Reform Action (URA) and the newly founded Europe Now! movement, finally deciding to highlight the candidacy of their leader Aleksa Bečić. Prime minister Dritan Abazović's URA party announced that it would not have its own candidate, eventually deciding to support a Bečić candidacy.

Initially, the Europe Now! movement decided to nominate its co-founder Milojko Spajić, former finance minister as its candidate. He was disqualified due to suspicions of him having Serbian citizenship; Montenegrin law does not allow people with dual citizenship to run for presidency. Spajić's disqualification by the national election body (DIK), composed mostly by DPS and DF delegates, was quick and did not wait for the completion of a probe launched by the Ministry of the Interior. Spajić said that at the time of submitting his candidacy he possessed Montenegrin citizenship only, submitting all legally required documents issued by the Ministry of Internal Affairs of Montenegro and a proof that he had officially renounced his Serbian citizenship earlier in February 2023. This further fueled speculation that DIK's decision was influenced by the DPS, as Spajić was seen as a serious threat to Đukanović. DIK members representing DF also voted to disqualify Spajić. Many NGO activists and lawyers criticized the rejection of the candidacy by the state commission, stating that it exceeded its authority, the absence of a legal basis for the rejection of the candidacy, and foreign interference (citing interference of the Serbian government) in the electoral process of Montenegro. Spajić's movement and some NGOs called DIK's decision a political disqualification and abuse of that body by representatives of the two largest political parties in the parliament: DPS and DF. The selectivity of the commission's decision is also problematic, given that DIK did not check the status of other candidates who were previously confirmed, including pro-Serbian DF's candidate Andrija Mandić, who has been repeatedly publicly announcing he holds Serbian citizenship as well, whose candidacy was confirmed at the beginning of February without checking those claims. In early February, Radio Free Europe and CEDEM analysts noted that candidate of newly founded centrist Europe Now! movement became subject of spin and negative campaign launched by media close to both the largest Montenegrin and Serbian nationalist parties, DPS and DF, which the movement later accused of coordinated activity against their candidate's campaign.

Shortly after that, Europe Now nominated Jakov Milatović, former Minister of Economy. His campaign did not go smoothly; in Cetinje, Montenegro's former capital, a group of about 30 people attacked Milatović on his way to a pre-election gathering, one day after the first electoral debate aired on 9 March on the national broadcaster chanel. This was followed by the publication of fake news, misinformation and a negative campaign against Milatović and members of his movement as well as some NGOs and Western foreign representatives who criticized the attack, which were pushed online mainly by media and organizations and activists supporting the incumbent president Đukanović, while some individuals close to Đukanović's party supported or relativized the attack, calling it a "peaceful protest of citizens". Europe Now said the group was organised by the DPS. Another group of people, also accused of being supporters of the DPS, attempted to prevent Milatović's meeting with supporters in the town of Nikšić over the last campaign weekend.

With both Đukanović and Milatović aiming to occupy the pro-EU centre ground, the debate came down to a question of political experience versus expertise gained outside politics. Đukanović said that the election would determine whether Montenegro would "develop as a modern European state, or if it will accept a position humbly serving other countries' interests". He compared the 19 March vote with that in 1997 when he was elected president for the first time, highlighting his status as one of Europe's longest-ruling leaders. On the other hand, political newcomer Milatović said it was time for Montenegrins to vote for people who have knowledge and expertise. As a departure from the identity issues that have long dominated the country politics, he emphasizes the country's economic development in his program, consistently setting himself apart from Đukanović and his DPS with strong anti-corruption messages. Pro-Serbian right-wing candidate Mandić disputed Milatović's claim that Montenegro needs experts, saying that Đukanović could only be ousted from power by someone as experienced in politics as he is; like Đukanović, Mandić has been involved in politics since the 1990s. Former speaker of the parliament Aleksa Bečić, the fourth out of the seven presidential candidates, running on centrist platform, said that "Montenegro's interests should come first and the interests of parties and candidates must be set aside". Social Democratic Party candidate Draginja Vuksanović was the only woman competing for the post. During the campaign, Đukanović presented himself in a statesmanlike manner while at the same time giving the impression that the "country would plunge into chaos and ruin if he were defeated". Controversial because Montenegro became increasingly corrupt during Đukanović's three decades of rule, the authoritarian nature of his leadership raised eyebrows among EU representatives. Mandić was "the eternal opposition" in Montenegrin politics. Mandić has long been known not only as a supporter of a joint state with Serbia but also as a hard-line Serb nationalist and opponent of Montenegro's Euro-Atlantic integration. During the campaign, Mandić parted with his radically pro-Serbian views in slices and sought a path to the political center, declaratively accepting Montenegro's NATO membership and supporting Montenegrin EU membership. At the end of the campaign, Đukanović stated that the Democratic Front and its leader Mandić "were not an unacceptable partner for future cooperation".

There were no institutional reaction to a complaint by the some NGOs and civic activists filed with the constitutional court against Đukanović's candidacy, citing that he cannot run for a third term and claimed that the national electoral commission wrongly interpreted the law by confirming Đukanović candidacy. This interpretation is controversial as when Đukanović served as president between 1998 and 2002 when Montenegro was part of a state union with Serbia. In the weeks before the 19 March first round, there were suggestions that Russia could try to interfere in Montenegro's vote. Gabriel Escobar, United States deputy assistant secretary overseeing policy towards the countries of the Western Balkans including Montenegro, warned that Russia would try to intervene in presidential election, provoking internal tensions and clashes in the period until the 19 March vote. Escobar said that Russia would use traditional channels for disinformation. In March, Montenegrin Digital Forensic Centre said that Russian intervention in Montenegrin politics strengthened after the 2020 general election when large pro-Russian parties became part of the ruling coalition. There have already been warnings of possible electoral frauds as the electoral roll has not been updated despite revelations back in 2020 that there were more than 50,000 phantom voters. The voting process was observed by an OSCE mission.

=== Candidates ===
Montenegrin State Electoral Commission (DIK) confirmed seven candidates.

- Candidate numbers were decided using a random draw on 4 March 2023.

| # | Candidate | Affiliation | Details and candidate summary |
|---|---|---|---|
| 1 | Milo Đukanović | Democratic Party of Socialists | Incumbent President (1998–2002; since 2018), former Prime Minister (1991–1998; 2003–2006; 2008–2010; 2012–2016), leader of the Democratic Party of Socialists since 1998. Candidacy announced on 24 February and submitted on 25 February 2023. |
| 2 | Jakov Milatović | Europe Now! | Economist, former Minister of Economy (2020–2022), Mayor-elect of Podgorica since 2022 election, co-founder and deputy leader of the newly founded Europe Now! movement. Candidacy announced on 23 February and submitted on 26 February 2023. |
| 3 | Andrija Mandić | Democratic Front | Member of Parliament (2001–2020; 2022–present), member of the presidency of the Democratic Front alliance, leader of the New Serb Democracy party, presidential candidate in 2008. Candidacy announced on 28 January and submitted on 3 February 2023. |
| 4 | Jovan Radulović | Independent | Personal trainer, internet personality and social media influencer from Podgorica, backed by a citizens' group. Candidacy submitted on 26 February and confirmed on 3 March 2023. |
| 5 | Goran Danilović | United Montenegro | Former Member of Parliament (2006–2016; 2016–2020), former Minister of Internal Affairs in the provisional cabinet (2016), founder and current leader of the United Montenegro. Candidacy announced on 28 January and submitted on 20 February 2023. |
| 6 | Aleksa Bečić | Democratic Montenegro | Member of Parliament since 2016, former President of the Parliament (2020–2022), founder and leader of the Democratic Montenegro party. Candidacy announced on 24 February and submitted on 26 February 2023. |
| 7 | Draginja Vuksanović | Social Democratic Party | Member of Parliament since 2012, professor of law at the University of Montenegro, member and former leader of the Social Democratic Party from 2019 to 2021, candidate in 2018. Candidacy announced on 9 February and submitted on 22 February 2023. |

=== Endorsements ===
Milo Đukanović
- Democratic Party of Socialists (DPS) (submitted)
- Bosniak Party (BS)
- Social Democrats (SD)
- Liberal Party (LP)
- Democratic Party (PD)
- Democratic Union of Albanians (UDSH)
- Croatian Civic Initiative (HGI)
- New Left (NL)
- Party of Montenegrin Muslims (PCM)
- Democratic Roma Party (DPR)
- Pedro Sánchez, Prime Minister of Spain and President of the Socialist International
- Stefan Löfven, President of the Party of European Socialists
- Dimitar Kovačevski, Prime Minister of North Macedonia
Jakov Milatović
- Europe Now! (PES!) (submitted)
- Citizens' Union "Civis" (CIVIS)
- Christian Democratic Movement (DP)
- Justice and Reconciliation Party (SPP)
- Yugoslav Communist Party (JKP)
- Novska lista (local)
- I Choose Bar–I Choose Montenegro (local)
- We won't give up Nikšić (local)
- Durmitor Initiative (local)
- Alternativa (Political party)
- Zdravko Krivokapić, former Prime Minister
- Aleksandar Stijović, former Minister of Agriculture and Rural Development
- Dejan Vukšić, withdrawn candidate
- Džemal Perović, civic activist
Andrija Mandić
- Democratic Front (DF) (submitted)
- Socialist People's Party (SNP)
- True Montenegro (PCG)
- Workers' Party (RP)
- Serb National Council of Montenegro (NGO)
- Vesna Bratić, former Minister of Education, Science, Culture and Sports
- Vladislav Dajković, president of Free Montenegro (political party)
- Milorad Dodik, President of Republika Srpska
Goran Danilović
- United Montenegro (UCG) (submitted)
Aleksa Bečić
- Democratic Montenegro (DCG) (submitted)
- United Reform Action (URA)
- League of Communists
- Democratic Serb Party (DSS)
- Movement "Novi Wins" (local)
- Movement "Plenum 083" (local)
- Dritan Abazović, incumbent acting Prime Minister
Draginja Vuksanović
- Social Democratic Party (SDP) (submitted)
- New Left (NL) (Note: Endorsed both Đukanović and Vuksanović)
- Genci Nimanbegu, leader of the New Democratic Force (Forca)

=== Electoral debates ===
| Date Time | Broadcaster | Candidates | | | | | | |
| Date Time | Broadcaster | Đukanović | Milatović | Mandić | Radulović | Danilović | Bečić | Vuksanović |
|---|---|---|---|---|---|---|---|---|
| 9 March; 20:00 | TVCG1 | P | P | P | A | P | P | P |
| ~~16 March~~; ~~20:00~~ | ~~TVCG1~~ (cancelled) | A (Note: Đukanović and Mandić refused the national broadcaster's electoral debate invitation, instead accepting one scheduled at the same time on private Prva TV, close to Mandić's DF. Other candidates refused to participate as well after the Đukanović and Mandić decision. Previously, the deadline for participating in the final debate was postponed twice, before it was canceled on the day of airing.) | A | A | A | A | A | A |
| 16 March; 20:00 | Prva TV | P | NI | P | NI | NI | NI | NI |
| 17 March; 20:00 | Vijesti | A | P | P | A | P | P | P |
P Invited/Present NI Non-invitee A Absent invitee

=== Second round ===
Long-ruling incumbent Đukanović portrayed the presidential runoff vote as a "choice between an independent Montenegro and a country controlled by neighboring Serbia and Russia", calling it "decisive battle for the survival of Montenegro", saying he "doesn't plan to lose the election", and that it can be expected that he would lead his party at the upcoming snap parliamentary vote. Đukanović insisted that voters also chose whether Montenegro would "advance toward EU integration or will continue to stumble, as has been the case in the past two years", since his DPS was ousted after 30 years in power. Milatović, who served in the Krivokapić Cabinet, the first post-DPS government, says Đukanović and his party "devastated Montenegro during their rule, allowing crime and corruption to engulf society". Đukanović accused his opponent Milatović of "brutal populism". Milatović declared Đukanović's era over, campaigning on the need for change and promising a better future. Observers said Milatović, a political newcomer who served in the government elected after the 2020 parliamentary election but later split from the ruling coalition, gained popularity because of his independent background and focus on everyday problems. Milatović said after he cast his ballot that Đukanović symbolises "divisive policies of the past", and that the vote is crucial for a future Montenegro that would be "richer, more just, more beautiful and more equal".

Both candidates pledge continuation of accession of Montenegro to the European Union. Đukanović, who dominated Montenegrin politics for 33 years, faced challenge after two governments collapsed within a year, and runoff rival Milatović, pro-Western former economy minister who vowed a fresh start after a year of political deadlock, advocating closer ties with both the European Union and neighbouring Serbia. Although the presidency in Montenegro is largely ceremonial post, it holds key powers to nominate prime ministers, dissolve parliament, and call elections, and analysts saw the runoff vote importance because it could signal a political reshuffle ahead of early parliamentary election in June. Whichever candidate wins is expected to give an important boost to his party's chances in the June vote. After announcing of the first preliminary results of the first round, Đukanović stated that he "doesn't plan to lose the election", expecting "mass support of diaspora voters" in the runoff, calling them "his vote reservoir". Milatović criticized those statements, calling such narratives manipulation and disrespect to Montenegrin voters living aboard, mostly composed of economic immigrants in the West, also blaming Đukanović's former regime responsibility for economic emigration from Montenegro. Đukanović criticized the European Union for allegedly allowing Russia to spread its influence in the Western Balkans, saying that the volatile region became a platform for anti-Western policies due to the EU's negligence. Đukanović alleged that the ruling coalition that came to power after a 2020 regime change has "devastated Montenegro economically and financially", due "their anti-EU policies". The coalition government pledged that Montenegro would remain on its European Union path. Milatović, supported by the governing parties in the runoff, expressed strong support for the country pursuing EU membership. Đukanović said the "ruling majority's policies indicate otherwise". Đukanović also relativized numerous corruption affair cases, which was seen as a key problem during his leadership of Montenegro, saying that corruption "exists in all countries in the world".

During the campaign, Đukanović made harsh accusations against his opponent, stating that Milatović was "destroying people's lives", even that he was "responsible for death" during the COVID-19 pandemic. Đukanović has repeatedly accused Milatović of secretly, "working for the Greater Serbian project" and receiving money for that, without elaborating on those allegations, while activists and officials of Đukanović's party daily spread claims that the candidate of the Europe Now! movement actually "working for the interests of Serbia and Russia", calling Milatović "anti-Montenegrin and anti-European candidate", as well accusing him of allegedly "threatening Montenegro's national interests, sovereignty and independence". Analysts said that for almost all election cycles in Montenegro since the introducing the multi-party system in 1990, there was a characteristic negative campaign, noting it as the one of reasons for which is that Montenegro has not yet been built into a full liberal democracy, and that the most common causes are the "fear of competition and the weakness of ruling party's candidates" during the decades of the former regime led by Đukanović. In response, Milatović said that "Đukanović scares citizens with recognizable methods of negative campaign", calling him "fake protector of the nation" and "dictator of the past". He added: "It is quite clear that the time has come when the forces gathered around the idea of a better Montenegro are winning at all levels, on idea that rests on freedom, justice, standard of living and economic progress." On 23 March, the Ministry of Internal Affairs confirmed that presidential candidate Milatović was assigned police protection, which his organization requested due to fears that he was physically threatened.

NGOs observing the electoral process noted media negative campaign, spin, and misinformation, mainly pushed by Serbian and Montenegrin nationalist media affiliated with Đukanović's DPS and Andrija Mandić's DF. NGO observers also called on the national Agency for the Prevention of Corruption (ASK) to investigate the case of an online paid negative campaign against Milatović.

=== Candidates ===
Candidates in the second round
| Milo Đukanović | Jakov Milatović |
| Democratic Party of Socialists | Europe Now! |
| Former; President of Montenegro (2018–2023) | Former; Minister of Economy of Montenegro (2020–2022) |

=== Endorsements ===
Milo Đukanović
- Social Democratic Party (SDP)
- Živko Andrijašević, historian
- Novak Adžić, lawyer and historian
- Adnan Čirgić, linguist and activist
- Miodrag Vlahović, politician and former diplomat
- Andrej Nikolaidis, Montenegrin-Bosnian writer
- Srđan Mrvaljević, Montenegrin judoka
- Bogdan Tanjević, Montenegrin-Bosnian basketball coach
- Veljko Bulajić, Montenegrin-Croatian film director
- SUBNOR, the Union of Associations of Fighters of the People's Liberation War
- Albin Kurti, Prime Minister of Kosovo
- Željko Komšić, Croat Member of the Presidency of Bosnia and Herzegovina
- Denis Bećirović, Bosniak Member of the Presidency of Bosnia and Herzegovina
- Sonja Biserko, Serbian human rights activist
- Rada Trajković, Kosovo Serb politician
- Filip David, Serbian writer and screenwriter
- Svetislav Basara, Serbian writer and columnist
- Aleksandar Olenik, Serbian lawyer and politician
- Nenad Čanak, former President of the Assembly of Vojvodina
- Žarko Korać, former Deputy Prime Minister of Serbia
- Roman Jakič, Slovenian politician
- Mothers of Srebrenica, Bosnian NGO
Jakov Milatović
- Andrija Mandić campaign
- Aleksa Bečić campaign
- Goran Danilović campaign
- Dritan Abazović, Prime Minister of Montenegro
- Miodrag Lekić (Demos), 2013 presidential candidate
- Democratic Front (DF)
- Democratic Montenegro (DCG)
- Socialist People's Party (SNP)
- United Reform Action (URA)
- True Montenegro (PCG)
- United Montenegro (UCG)
- Workers' Party (RP)
- Vladislav Dajković, president of Free Montenegro (political party)
- Social Democratic Union (SDU)
- League of Communists
- Democratic Serb Party (DSS)
- Movement "Novi Wins" (local)
- Movement "Plenum 083" (local)
- Boka Forum (local)
- Balša Brković, writer and civic activist
- Đuro Radosavović, writer and civic activist
- Dževdet Pepić, human rights activist
- Bojana Jokić, human rights activist
- Džemal Perović, civic activist
- Milka Tadić-Mijović, journalist and international civic activist
- Miodrag Perović, journalist and media publisher
- Duško Knežević, businessman
- Igor Đurović, university professor and member of the CANU
- Aleksandar Dragićević, ecological activist
- SOBNOR, Union of the Organization of Fighters of the People's Liberation War
- Vojislav Šešelj, Serbian ultranationalist politician (endorsement denied by candidate himself)
- People's Party (Narodna)
- Democratic Party (DS)
- Party of Freedom and Justice (SSP)
- Together
- New Democratic Party of Serbia (NDSS)
- Movement for the Restoration of the Kingdom of Serbia (POKS)
- Movement of Free Citizens (PSG)
- Movement for Reversal (PZP)
- United Trade Unions of Serbia "Sloga" (USS Sloga)
- Fatherland
- Social Democratic Party (SDS)

=== Electoral debates ===
The only electoral TV duel between presidential candidates in the second round runoff, Milo Đukanović and Jakov Milatović, was scheduled for 31 March in the production of RTCG, the national public broadcaster of Montenegro and aired live on the TVCG1 channel.

== Opinion polls ==
Poll results are listed in the tables below in reverse chronological order, showing the most recent first, and using the date the survey's fieldwork was done, as opposed to the date of publication. If such date is unknown, the date of publication is given instead. The highest percentage figure in each polling survey is displayed in bold, and the background shaded in the leading party's colour. In the instance that there is a tie, then no figure is shaded. The lead column on the right shows the percentage-point difference between the two candidates with the highest figures. No opinion polls were published since the beginning of the presidential election official campaign, except for several hypothetical surveys conducted earlier.

Hypothetical surveys

First round

| Date | Polling firm/source | Đukanović | Spajić | Bečić | Mandić | Vuksanović | Danilović | Others | None | Lead |
|---|---|---|---|---|---|---|---|---|---|---|
| Feb 2023 | MB/CeDem | **35.7%** | **21.2%** | 15.8% | 19.9% | 6.1% | – | 1.2% | n/a | 14.5% |
| Feb 2023 | IDD | **22.7%** | **30%** | 4.6% | 10% | 3% | 4% | 15.7% | 9.2% | **7.3%** |
| Date | Polling firm/source | Đukanović | Krivokapić | Bečić | Mandić | Abazović | Lekić | Others | | Lead |
| June 2021 | CeDem | **41.5%** | 9.6% | **19.4%** | 11.5% | 7.3% | – | 10.7% | | **22.1%** |
| Oct 2020 | NSPM | **30.3%** | **25.2%** | 13% | 4.5% | 12.7% | 3.3% | 11% | | **5.1%** |

Second round

| Date | Polling firm/source | Đukanović | Spajić | Lead |
|---|---|---|---|---|
| Feb 2023 | MB/CeDem | 44.7% | **55.3%** | **10.6%** |

| Date | Polling firm/source | Đukanović | Bečić | Lead |
|---|---|---|---|---|
| Feb 2023 | MB/CeDem | 47.1% | **52.9%** | 5.8% |

| Date | Polling firm/source | Đukanović | Mandić | Lead |
|---|---|---|---|---|
| Feb 2023 | MB/CeDem | **54.7%** | 45.3% | 9.4% |

Approval rating polls

Surveys that include average approval ratings of main (as well formerly potential) candidates, published between 2018 and 2023 elections. The highest rated figures in each polling survey is displayed in bold font.

| Date | Polling firm/source | Đukanović DPS | Vuković DPS | Bečić DCG | Abazović URA | Lekić Demos | Mandić DF | Danilović UCG | Vuksanović SDP | Krivokapić DP | Spajić ES! | Milatović ES! |
|---|---|---|---|---|---|---|---|---|---|---|---|---|
| Dec 2022 | CeDem | 2.35 | 2.05 | 2.41 | 2.19 | 2.08 | 1.97 | 1.98 | 1.78 | 2.12 | **2.6** | **2.51** |
| July 2022 | CeDem | 2.37 | 2.0 | 2.45 | 2.11 | 1.96 | 1.91 | 2.01 | 1.78 | 2.22 | **2.62** | **2.51** |
| Dec 2021 | CeDem | **2.35** | – | **2.41** | 2.23 | 1.94 | 1.91 | 2.0 | 1.9 | 2.19 | – | – |
| June 2021 | CeDem | **2.45** | – | **2.47** | 2.37 | 1.98 | 1.88 | 1.88 | 1.9 | 2.17 | – | – |
| Aug 2020 | CeDem | **2.45** | – | 2.34 | 2.25 | 2.15 | 1.97 | 1.98 | 1.69 | **2.53** | – | – |
| Dec 2019 | CeDem | **2.52** | – | **2.19** | 2.05 | 1.98 | 1.88 | 1.88 | 1.85 | – | – | – |
| July 2019 | CeDem | **2.44** | – | **2.31** | 2.18 | 2.06 | 1.94 | 1.86 | 1.91 | – | – | – |
| Dec 2018 | CeDem | **2.73** | – | **2.51** | 2.19 | 1.89 | 1.83 | 1.92 | 1.88 | – | – | – |

== Results ==
| Candidate | Party | First round | | Second round | |
| Candidate | Party | Votes | % | Votes | % |
|---|---|---|---|---|---|
| Milo Đukanović | Democratic Party of Socialists | 119,685 | 35.37 | 154,769 | 41.12 |
| Jakov Milatović | Europe Now! | 97,867 | 28.92 | 221,592 | 58.88 |
| Andrija Mandić | Democratic Front | 65,394 | 19.32 | | |
| Aleksa Bečić | Democratic Montenegro | 37,563 | 11.10 | | |
| Draginja Vuksanović | Social Democratic Party | 10,669 | 3.15 | | |
| Goran Danilović | United Montenegro | 4,659 | 1.38 | | |
| Jovan Radulović | Independent | 2,574 | 0.76 | | |
| Total | | 338,411 | 100.00 | 376,361 | 100.00 |
| Valid votes | | 338,411 | 99.07 | 376,361 | 98.97 |
| Invalid/blank votes | | 3,169 | 0.93 | 3,920 | 1.03 |
| Total votes | | 341,580 | 100.00 | 380,281 | 100.00 |
| Registered voters/turnout | | 542,154 | 63.00 | 542,154 | 70.14 |
Source: State Electoral Commission

=== By subdivision ===
==== Second round ====
| Municipality (Region) | Milo Đukanović | | Jakov Milatović | | Registered voters | Voter turnout |
| Municipality (Region) | Vote | % | Vote | % | Registered voters | Voter turnout |
|---|---|---|---|---|---|---|
| Podgorica | 37,122 | 34.51% | 70,438 | 65.49% | 143,608 | 75.20 |
| Nikšić | 16,941 | 38.19% | 27,419 | 61.81% | 57,326 | 75.20 |
| Cetinje | 6,353 | 71.31% | 2,556 | 28.69% | 13,372 | 67.16 |
| Danilovgrad | 3,330 | 31.99% | 7,080 | 68.01% | 13,170 | 79.45 |
| Golubovci | 2,101 | 21.11% | 7,852 | 78.89% | 12,542 | 79.52 |
| Tuzi | 5,855 | 82.01% | 1,284 | 17.98% | 12,383 | 57.31 |
| Central Region | 71,702 | 38.07% | 116,629 | 61.93% | 252,401 | 74.62 |
| Bijelo Polje | 13,067 | 47.64% | 14,362 | 52.36% | 39,362 | 68.75 |
| Pljevlja | 5,269 | 28.33% | 13,332 | 71.67% | 24,452 | 76.39 |
| Berane | 4,291 | 26.66% | 11,805 | 73.34% | 23,409 | 66.63 |
| Rožaje | 11,004 | 83.26% | 2,213 | 16.74% | 22,836 | 58.31 |
| Plav | 3,721 | 72.38% | 1,420 | 27.62% | 9,374 | 55.43 |
| Mojkovac | 1,794 | 35.50% | 3,260 | 64.50% | 6,538 | 78.34 |
| Petnjica | 2,676 | 87.91% | 368 | 12.09% | 6,259 | 48.65 |
| Kolašin | 1,291 | 27.17% | 3,461 | 72.83% | 6,054 | 79.34 |
| Gusinje | 1,513 | 88.79% | 191 | 11.21% | 4,549 | 37.83 |
| Andrijevica | 925 | 32.69% | 1,905 | 67.31% | 3,846 | 65.30 |
| Žabljak | 709 | 31.26% | 1,559 | 68.74% | 3,010 | 73.49 |
| Plužine | 237 | 12.54% | 1,653 | 87.46% | 2,349 | 79.31 |
| Šavnik | 735 | 47.95% | 798 | 52.05% | 1,777 | 87.56 |
| Northern Region | 47,232 | 45.61% | 56,327 | 54.39% | 153,815 | 67.33 |
| Bar | 12,330 | 50.09% | 12,286 | 49.91% | 39,869 | 62.45 |
| Herceg Novi | 4,210 | 25.32% | 12,417 | 74.68% | 25,462 | 66.14 |
| Ulcinj | 6,515 | 68.80% | 2,955 | 31.20% | 20,566 | 46.10 |
| Budva | 4,038 | 31.53% | 8,770 | 68.47% | 18,847 | 68.23 |
| Kotor | 5,119 | 41.75% | 7,141 | 58.25% | 18,385 | 67.63 |
| Tivat | 3,470 | 42.31% | 4,731 | 57.69% | 12,007 | 69.02 |
| Coastal Region | 35,682 | 42.49% | 48,300 | 57.51% | 135,136 | 62.15 |
