= 2022 Podgorica City Assembly election =

← 2018	23 October 2022	2024 →
- 58 seats in the City Assembly; 30 seats needed for a majority
- Turnout: 69.3%
Party	Leader	Vote %	Seats	+/–
DPS-led coalition (Note: Officially under the name "Everyone for Our City!" (Montenegrin: Svi za naš grad!), the coalition comprises DPS, SDP, SD, LP, BS, DUA/UDSh, NL, DRP and GI21M.)	Ivan Vuković	38.1%	24	−8
PES!-DSJ	Jakov Milatović	21.7%	13	New
DF-PCG-SCG	Jelena Borovinić Bojović	18.2%	11	+3
DCG-UCG-DEMOS	Danilo Šaranović	10.8%	6	New
URA-CIVIS-AA	Luka Rakčević	6.4%	4	New
This lists parties that won seats. See the complete results below.

On 23 October 2022, elections were held to elect members of the City Assembly of Podgorica, the capital of Montenegro. Eight parties or coalitions contested for 58 seats, with a 3% vote threshold required to win seats.

== Electoral system ==
Voters in Podgorica determine the composition of the City Assembly, which in turn elects the Mayor, who is thus indirectly elected by the voters. Only parties that reach an electoral threshold of 3% gain seats in the Assembly. The Mayor may or may not be a councillor of the Assembly, which is elected every four years.

== Campaign ==
Although some campaigns address local issues, most campaigns address only national issues due to the high degree of political polarisation in Montenegro.

Europe Now (ES), a new economically liberal movement, nominated Jakov Milatović, an economist and popular minister of the 42nd Cabinet, for mayor. The party is running on an anti-corruption platform, focused on overthrowing the ruling DPS. In addition, ES also wants to increase tourism in Podgorica and build a new business district.

The Democrats' coalition is also focused on overthrowing DPS, barely addressing local topics.

The URA coalition has put forth many proposals that are focused on making Podgorica greener, such as stopping the ongoing destruction of forests and parks. They plan to build a tram system, as the only public transport Podgorica has now are buses. Most other campaigns, mainly the DPS, back this, but claim it is now too expensive to build, and such must be postponed until Montenegro joins the EU. In their campaign pamphlet, the URA also plan to close off the Old Town, currently barely walkable, as well as the city centre, and build underground parking lots in both parts of the city.

The Socialist People's Party of Montenegro (SNP) is running alone, and its campaign resembles the centre-left shift the party has been taking since entering the minority government. It promotes a green, 'smart city' campaign.

The Democratic Front (DF)–led coalition's composition shows the alliance's shift to the right, with politicians such as radical conservative, Christian fundamentalist, and pro-Russian Vladislav Dajković leading a party in the coalition. Dajković is one of the more radical Serbian nationalist politicians in Montenegro and notoriously posts tweets on Twitter that deny the Montenegrin ethnicity and language and claim Montenegro as a 'Serbian Sparta'. The DF campaign, called "For the Future of Podgorica" (Montenegrin: Za budućnost Podgorice) mainly focuses on national topics, advocating for Christian conservative and Serbian nationalist values, but also advocates for overthrowing DPS due to corruption.

The Democratic Party of Socialists of Montenegro (DPS)–led coalition is currently in power and is headed by Ivan Vuković. Vuković tries to distance his campaign from the notoriously corrupt national branch of DPS and focuses on local topics, with a green liberal platform. His campaign book goes over the changes in the last 4 years, and despite the two parties being strongly opposed to each other, DPS promises to match the URA promises, although on a smaller scale.

Reversal (Montenegrin: Preokret) is a small anti-corruption and green movement aiming to end particracy. It has been able to widely publicize many of its views due to the movement being very small and new. Along with Podgorica, it is participating in the Danilovgrad elections.

The Saint Sava Serbian List (Montenegrin: Svetosavska srpska lista) is a small, radically conservative, Christian fundamentalist, and Serbian nationalist electoral list. Their arguments edge close to some of Dajković's rhetoric, and they barely suggest anything involving local issues, only attempting to rally support for the Serbian Orthodox Church, the majority church in Montenegro.

== Results ==
Party	%	Seats
"Everyone for Our City!" - Democratic Party of Socialists coalition	38.1%	24
Europe Now-Democratic Party of Unity	21.7%	13
"For the Future of Podgorica" - Democratic Front, True Montenegro, Free Montenegro	18.2%	11
"Let's go, people!" - Democratic Montenegro, United Montenegro, DEMOS	10.8%	6
"This is Our City - Podgorica Can" - United Reform Action, CIVIS, Albanian Alternative	6.4%	4
"Thoroughly for Podgorica" - Socialist People's Party	2.8%	-
"It's Time for a Reversal" - Reversal	1.8%	-
Saint Sava Serbian List	0.2%	-
