= Christian Democratic Movement (Montenegro) =

Christian Democratic Movement Demohrišćanski pokret Демохришћански покрет
- Abbreviation: DP, DHP
- President: Mladen Premović
- Founder: Zdravko Krivokapić
- Founded: 22 September 2022
- Split from: Ne damo Crnu Goru; Evropa sad! (local branches)
- Preceded by: Ne damo Crnu Goru
- Headquarters: Podgorica
- Ideology: Christian democracy Ethnic Serb interests
- Political position: Centre-right
- Religion: Serbian Orthodox Church
- Colours: Blue Raspberry
- Parliament: 0 / 81
- Mayors: 0 / 25
- Local Parliaments: 4 / 844

Website
- demohriscanskipokret.me

The Christian Democratic Movement (Serbian: Демохришћански покрет, ДП, romanized: Demohrišćanski pokret, DP) is a Montenegrin Christian democratic, moderate right and pro-EU political party founded by university professor and former Prime Minister, Zdravko Krivokapić on 22 September 2022. DP current leader is Dejan Vukšić, lawyer and former director of the National Security Agency.

== History ==
The party was founded by university professor and former PM in technocratic cabinet, Zdravko Krivokapić and former head of the National Security Agency, Dejan Vukšić on 22 September 2022 in Podgorica. As Krivokapić stated, the goal of the party is to create a value system "in which ethics will be based on traditional values". Speaking about the visual symbol of the party, Krivokapić said that the top of the badge has a flower of the Mother of God, and the best defense of the state is "if it is guarded by the Mother of God".

It was announced that Dejan Vukšić would become the president of the movement. Vukšić said that the goal of the movement is "Christian reconciliation of ethnic Serbs and Montenegrins". He also said that changing the electoral law would be one of the new movement's priorities and that it would fight "partocracy" and "party employment". It was known that some of the councillors and members of local branches of the Evropa sad! were moving to Krivokapić's movement.

Shortly after the establishment of the DP, the former PM and founder of the party, Krivokapić announced to the leader Vuksić that he had decided to retire from political and public life.

On 30 January 2023, party leader Dejan Vukšić announced his candidacy for the March 2023 presidential elections, with the support of the Democratic Serb Party and affiliated councilors in the local parliaments in Nikšić, Berane, Herceg Novi, Kotor and Mojkovac, elected on the lists of Peace is Our Nation (MjNN) and the Evropa sad! at the 2021 and 2022 municipal elections.

== Electoral performance ==
=== Parliamentary elections ===
Election	Party leader	Performance				Alliance	Government
Election	Party leader	Votes	%	Seats	+/–	Alliance	Government
2023	Dejan Vukšić	3,630	1.20%	0 / 81	New	NK	Extra-parliamentary
