= 2024 Montenegrin municipal elections =

Early local elections were held in Montenegro on 26 May in Budva, and on 2 June in Andrijevica.

Local elections were also held in Gusinje on 15 September, as well as in Kotor and the capital Podgorica on 29 September.

The winning lists in the elections for Budva were unable to agree on a post-election coalition, and new elections have been scheduled for November 17.

== Results ==
=== Budva ===
Party / Coalition	Lead candidate	Popular vote	% of vote	Seats	±	Gov't
NSD–DNP–SNP–PzP	Mladen Mikijelj	2,842	25.44	9	▼10	Snap election
BNG	Nikola Jovanović	2,671	23.91	9	New	Snap election
DPS	Nikola Milović	2,228	19.94	7	▲2	Snap election
DCG–DSS	Đorđe Zenović	1,194	10.70	4	Steady	Snap election
PES	Predrag Zenović	784	6.92	2	New	Snap election
URA	Blažo Rađenović	550	4.92	1	Steady	Snap election
SDP–SD–LP	Petar Odžić	514	4.60	1	▼3	Snap election
CEP	Novak Adžić	239	2.14	0	—N/a	Snap election
ZPP	Božidar Vujičić	149	1.33	0	—N/a	Snap election

=== Andrijevica ===
Party / Coalition	Lead candidate	Popular vote	% of vote	Seats	±	Gov't
DPS	Srđan Mašović	980	35.32	11	▼4	No
SNP–DCG	Željko Ćulafić	670	24.14	8	▼2	Yes
PES	Dragana Vučević	380	13.69	4	New	Yes
NSD–DNP	Migo Čukić	304	10.95	3	▼3	Yes
ZBND	Ivan Radojević	248	8.94	3	New	No
VPZU	Vesko Raketić	145	5.23	1	New	Yes
UCG	Milovan Dukić	51	1.84	0	—N/a	—N/a

=== Gusinje ===
Party / Coalition	Lead candidate	Popular vote	% of vote	Seats	±	Gov't
BS–SD–SDP–LP	Sanel Balić	916	43.39	14	▲4	Yes
DSA–AA–DUA–DS	Salih Gjonbalaj	494	23.40	7	▲1	No
DPS	Demir Bajrović	435	20.61	6	▼6	No
PZG	Fadilj Uljaj	157	7.44	2	New	Yes
DCG	Minela Čekić	109	5.16	1	New	Yes

=== Podgorica ===
Party / Coalition	Lead candidate	Popular vote	% of vote	Seats	±	Gov't
DPS	Nermin Abdić	24.309	29.95	19	▲3	No
PES–DCG–DSS	Saša Mujović	17.672	21.77	14	▼3	Yes
NSD–DNP–SNP–UCG–PCG–SCG–SDU–DSJ	Jelena Borovinić-Bojović	16.361	20.17	13	▲2	Yes
PzPG–URA–PzP	Luka Rakčević	8.538	10.52	6	▼5	Yes; PzPG (4)
PzPG–URA–PzP	Luka Rakčević	8.538	10.52	6	▼5	No; URA (2)
SD–SDP–LP	Boris Mugoša	4.411	5.43	3	▼2	No
PP	Srđan Perić	2.705	3.33	2	▲2	No
SEP	Ilija Mugoša	2.504	3.08	2	New	No
PN	Vuk Kadić	2.233	2.75	0	—N/a	—N/a
BS	Edin Tuzović	953	1.17	0	▼1	—N/a
CEP	Novak Adžić	573	0.71	0	—N/a	—N/a
PL	Andrej Milović	515	0.63	0	—N/a	—N/a
PPGNG	Nemanja Baošić	226	0.28	0	—N/a	—N/a
CGA	Stanko Đurišić	174	0.21	0	—N/a	—N/a

=== Kotor ===
Party / Coalition	Lead candidate	Popular vote	% of vote	Seats	±	Gov't
DPS	Neđeljko Moškov	2.834	28.38	10	▼2	No
PES–DCG	Vladimir Jokić	2.583	26.03	10	▲1	Yes
NSD–DNP	Snežana Jovanić	937	9.48	3	▼1	Yes
DA	Davor Kumburović	888	8.48	3	New	Yes
GL	Vojin Batuta	808	8.42	3	New	Yes
SD–SDP–LP	Miloš Čelanović	525	5.26	2	▼1	No
HGI	Dijana Milošević	452	4.75	1	▲1	No
KP	Siniša Kovačević	306	3.19	1	New	Yes
SNP–DSS	Maja Mršulja	163	1.81	0	▼1	—N/a
CGA	Goran Grbović	170	1.75	0	—N/a	—N/a
ČG	Aleksandar Tomčuk	167	1.73	0	—N/a	—N/a
ZK	Miljan Popović	71	0.72	0	—N/a	—N/a

=== Budva ===
Party / Coalition	Lead candidate	Popular vote	% of vote	Seats	±	Gov't
NSD–DNP–SNP–PzP–NB	Mladen Mikijelj	2979	25.93	9	Steady	No
BNG	Nikola Jovanović	2907	25.3	9	Steady	Yes
DPS	Nikola Milović	2523	21.96	7	Steady	Yes
DCG–PES	Dragana Kažanegra Stanišić	1117	9.72	3	▼3	No
PZG	Đorđe Zenović	736	6.41	2	New	No
SDP–SD–LP	Petar Odžić	678	5.9	2	▲1	Yes
URA	Blažo Rađenović	412	3.59	1	Steady	Yes
ZPP	Božidar Vujičić	138	1.2	0	Steady	—N/a

=== Berane ===
Party / Coalition	Lead candidate	Popular vote	% of vote	Seats	±	Gov't
PES–SNP–DSS	Đole Lutovac	4529	32.78	12	▲1	Yes
NSD–DNP–UCG–PCG	Jelena Božović	2963	21.44	8	0	Yes
DPS	Miro Nedić	1916	13.87	5	▼2	No
DCG	Božo Premović	1702	12.32	4	▼2	Yes
ZŠVB	Vesko Mujović	872	6.31	2	▲2	Yes
BS	Denis Adrović	826	5.98	2	▲1	Supp.
SCG	Milovan Živković	428	3.10	1	▲1	Yes
SD–SDP–LP	Radosav Golubović	252	1.82	0	▼1	—N/a
ŽZM	Milanko Šćekić	82	0.59	0	—N/a	—N/a
SPP	Bilal Agović	58	0.42	0	—N/a	—N/a

== List of mayors and local governments ==
Municipality	Mayor before elections	Party	Mayor after elections	Party	Local government
Budva	Milo Božović	NSD	Nikola Jovanović	BND	BNG–DPS–SDP–SD–URA
Andrijevica	Željko Ćulafić	SNP	Željko Ćulafić	SNP	SNP–PES–ZBCG–DCG–VPZU
Gusinje	Sanel Balić	BS	Sanel Balić	BS	BS–SD–SDP–LP–PZG
Kotor	Vladimir Jokić	DCG	Vladimir Jokić	DCG	DCG–PES–ZBCG–GL–DA–KP
Podgorica	Olivera Injac	PES	Saša Mujović	PES	PES–DCG–ZBCG–PzPG–SNP–UCG–PCG–SCG
Berane	Vuko Todorović	NSD	Đole Lutovac	PES	PES–SNP–ZBCG–DCG–ZŠVB–UCG
