= 2024 Podgorica City Assembly election =

- 29 September 2024
- 59 seats in the City Assembly; 30 seats needed for a majority
- Turnout: 56.5%
Party	Leader	Vote %	Seats	+/–
DPS	Nermin Abrić	29.9%	19	+2
DS-DCG	Saša Mujović	21.8%	14	−4
DF-PCG-SCG-UCG-SNP	Jelena Borovinić Bojović	20.2%	13	+1
Jakov Milatović-URA-PZP	Luka Rakčević	10.5%	6	−5
SD/SDP/LP	Boris Mugoša	5.1%	3	−3
SEP	Ilija Mugoša	3.1%	2	New
PP	Srđan Perić	3.0%	2	+2
This lists parties that won seats. See the complete results below.

On 29 September 2024, elections were held to elect members of the City Assembly of Podgorica, the capital of Montenegro. 13 parties or coalitions contested for 59 seats, with a 3% vote threshold required to win seats.

== Electoral system ==
Voters in Podgorica determine the composition of the City Assembly, which in turn elects the Mayor, who is thus indirectly elected by the voters. Only parties that reach an electoral threshold of 3% gain seats in the Assembly. The Mayor may or may not be a councillor of the Assembly, which is elected every four years.

== Electoral lists ==
Electoral list	Leader	Note
Time to work! — SEP — Duško Marković	Ilija Mugoša	
Naprijed — Dr. Vuk Kadić - Pokret Naprijed	Vuk Kadić	
European Alliance — Boris Mugoša	Boris Mugoša	
DPS – In word and deed	Nermin Abdić	
Movement Turnaround (PP)	Srđan Perić	
Even stronger (PES–DCG)	Saša Mujović	
Andrej Milović – Podgorica’ List	Andrej Milović	
CEP – Montenegrin european party – Novak Adžić	Boris Marinović	
For the Future of Montenegro	Jelena Borovinić Bojović	
For better Podgorica (PzPG-URA-PZP)	Luka Rakčević	
Tenants’ Movement	Nemanja Baošić	
CGA – Action - Be yours! Choose CGA!	Stanko Đuričić	
Bosniak Party	Edin Tuzović	M

== Opinion polls ==
Poll results are listed in the table below in reverse chronological order, showing the most recent first, and using the date the survey's fieldwork was done, as opposed to the date of publication. If such date is unknown, the date of publication is given instead. The highest percentage figure in each polling survey is displayed in bold, and the background shaded in the leading party's colour. In the instance that there is a tie, then no figure is shaded. The lead column on the right shows the percentage-point difference between the two parties with the highest figures. When a specific poll does not show a data figure for a party, the party's cell corresponding to that poll is shown empty. The threshold for a party to elect members is 3%.

Date	Polling firm/source	PES	DEM	DPS	ES				ZBCG		SNP	Jakov Milatović	URA	PP	Others	Lead
Date	Polling firm/source	PES	DEM	DPS	SD	SDP	SEP	BS	NSD	DNP	SNP	Jakov Milatović	URA	PP	Others	Lead
25 Dec 2024	2024 Election results	21.8		**29.9**	5.4		3.1	1.2	20.2			10.5		3.3	4.6	8.1
11 Sep 2024	Borba	**24.7**		24.1	4.4		5.4	-	20.2			7.3		3.5	13.0	1.7
9 Aug 2024	Borba	17	8	**26.5**	-		-	-	17		3.7	7.5	4.5	2.0	13.8	9.5
26 Jul 2024	Borba	16.8	8.3	**24.1**	4.4		1.8	1.4	17.2		1.7	11.2	4.1	3.8	2.2	9.9
15 Nov 2024	2022 Election results	21.7	10.8	**38.1**					18.2		2.8	with PES	6.4	1.8	0.2	16.4

== Results ==
Candidate	Party	Votes	%	Seats
Nermin Abdić	DPS	24,310	29.95	19
Saša Mujović	PES!-DCG	17,672	21.77	14
Jelena Borovinić Bojović	DF-PCG-SCG-UCG-SNP	16,362	20.16	13
Luka Rakčević	Jakov Milatović-URA-PZP	8,537	10.52	6
Boris Mugoša	SD/SDP/LP	4,411	5.43	3
Ilija Mugoša	SEP	2,504	3.08	2
Srđan Perić	PP	2,704	3.33	2
Vuk Kadić	Naprijed	2,235	2.75	0
Edin Tuzović	BS	955	1.18	0
Boris Marinović	CEP	573	0.71	0
Andrej Milović	PL	515	0.63	0
Nemanja Baošić	PP	226	0.28	0
Stanko Đuričić	CGA	174	0.21	0
Total		81,178	100.00	59
Valid votes		81,178	98.66	
Invalid/blank votes		1,104	1.34	
Total votes		82,282	100.00	
Registered voters/turnout		145,724	56.46	
