= City Assembly of the Capital City of Podgorica =

Legislature of Podgorica, Montenegro

City Assembly of the Capital City of Podgorica Skupština Glavnog grada Podgorica Скупштина Главног града Подгорице

Type
- Type: Unicameral

Leadership
- President of the City Assembly: Jelena Borovinić Bojović, DF since 13 April 2023

Structure
- Seats: 58
- Length of term: Four years

Elections
- Voting system: Proportional representation
- Last election: 23 October 2022
- Next election: 2026

Website
- skupstina.podgorica.me

City Assembly of the Capital City of Podgorica (Montenegrin: Skupština Glavnog grada Podgorica / Скупштина Главног града Подгорица) is the legislature of Podgorica, the capital of Montenegro. The assembly elects the mayor of Podgorica.

== Composition ==
The assembly consists of 58 members.

Party/Coalition	Seats	Local government
Democratic Party of Socialists	13 / 58	Opposition
Europe Now	8 / 58	Government
Democratic Front	7 / 58	Government
Movement for Podgorica	5 / 58	Government
Democratic Montenegro	4 / 58	Government
Movement for Changes	3 / 58	Government
United Reform Action	3 / 58	Government
Social Democratic Party	2 / 58	Opposition
Social Democrats	2 / 58	Opposition
Civic Initiative '21 May'	2 / 58	Opposition
True Montenegro	1 / 58	Government
United Montenegro	1 / 58	Government
Demos	1 / 58	Government
Civis	1 / 58	Government
Liberal Party	1 / 58	Opposition
Bosniak Party	1 / 58	Opposition

== President ==
The president of the City Assembly represents the assembly, convenes the session of the assembly, presides over and directs its work, proposes the agenda of the assembly session, takes care of the implementation of the rules of procedure of the assembly, signs acts of the assembly, takes care of the implementation of decisions and other acts of the assembly, coordinates the work of the working bodies of the assembly, cooperates with the mayor, takes care of the publicity of the work of the Assembly and performs other tasks in accordance with the law, the statute and the rules of procedure. The current president of the assembly is Jelena Borovinić Bojović since 13 April 2023.
