= 2025 Montenegrin municipal elections =

== Results ==
=== April elections ===
==== Nikšić ====
Party / Coalition	Popular vote	% of votes	Seats	±	Gov't
DPS	14.580	35.12%	16	▲2	No
NSD–DNP–SNP–UCG–DEMOS –SCG–SDU–JKP–DSJ	14.381	34.64%	15	▲4	Yes
PES–BS	5.188	12.50%	5	New entry	Yes
DCG	3.038	7.32%	3	▼7	Yes
SDP–SD–LP	2.103	5.07%	2	0	No
URA	783	1.89%	0	▼1	—N/a
PNK	514	1.24%	0	—N/a	—N/a
RZMG	438	1.08%	0	—N/a	—N/a
SEP	388	0.93%	0	—N/a	—N/a
ZSNJM	103	0.25%	0	—N/a	—N/a

==== Herceg Novi ====
Party / Coalition	Popular vote	% of votes	Seats	±	Gov't
DCG	4.067	31.43%	12	▲2	Yes
NL	3.320	25.66%	10	▲3	Yes
DPS	1.972	15.24%	5	▼2	No
NSD–DNP–PCG–UCG–SDU	1.661	12.84%	5	▼2	Yes
GPI!	595	4.60%	1	New entry	No
URA	464	3.59%	1	▼1	No
SDP–SD–LP	438	3.39%	1	0	No
