= Neso =

Neso may refer to:

- Neso (mythology), several figures in Greek mythology, including:
  - Neso, one of the Nereids
- Neso (moon), the second-outermost moon of Neptune
- Neso Lake, a glacial lake in Manitoba, Canada
- National Energy System Operator, the UK national energy grid operator since October 2024
- North East Students' Organization, India
- Nešo Šćepović, Montenegrin businessman and politician c. early 20th century

== See also ==
- Nesso, a comune in Como, Lombardy, Italy
