= 2022 Montenegrin municipal elections =

2022 Montenegrin local elections
- March (Berane and Ulcinj); 23 October (14 municipalities)
- 458 seats in local parliaments
Party	Leader	Seats	+/–
DPS	Milo Đukanović	110	−86
DF	Collective leadership	98	+52
PES!	Milojko Spajić	41	+41
BS	Ervin Ibrahimović	39	+10
SNP	Vladimir Joković	37	−2
DCG	Aleksa Bečić	36	−16
SD	Damir Šehović	33	−7
URA	Dritan Abazović	25	+14
SDP	Raško Konjević	23	+10
KSH	Gëzim Hajdinaga	11	+4
AO	Nazif Cungu	10	−2
BB	Radomir Novaković	2	−3
This lists parties that won seats. See the complete results below.
Mayoral seats before	Mayoral seats after
DPS (10); SNP (2); BS (1); SD (1); DF (1); Independent (1)	DF (4); PES! (2); DPS (2); URA (1); SNP (1); DCG (1); SD (1); Independent (1); BS (1); DI (1)

Local elections were held in Montenegro in March and October 2022 in 13 municipalities and early elections in 2 municipalities.

In June 2021, President of the Parliament of Montenegro Aleksa Bečić started the initiative for organizing local elections in 17 or 18 municipalities in the same day in 2022.

President of Montenegro, Milo Đukanović, set elections for 26 January 2022 in Berane and for 27 March Ulcinj. On 4 February Montenegro Parliament changed the law for elections in municipalities with the goal that all elections are going to be held on one day, but president Milo Đukanović did not support this change.

President Đukanović set early elections in Tivat and Budva as well as regular elections: in Žabljak and Plužine for 5 June; elections in Bijelo Polje and Šavnik for 12 June; and elections in Bar, Danilovgrad, Kolašin and Podgorica for 19 June.

After the new governing majority (DPS, URA, BS, SD and SNP) was formed, they gave initiative to shift elections in 14 municipalities for 23 October.

== Results ==
=== March elections ===
==== Berane ====
Party / Coalition	Popular vote	% of vote	Seats	±	Gov't
DPS-SD-BS-LP	3,798	25.6%	9	▼8	No
SNP	2,821	19%	7	0	No
DF	2,559	17.2%	6	0	Yes
DCG	2,452	16.5%	6	▲2	Yes
ES	1,601	10.8%	4	▲4	Yes
PCG	820	5.5%	2	▲2	Yes
UCG	688	4.6%	1	0	Yes
BIA	115	0.8%	0	0	—N/a

==== Ulcinj ====
Party / Coalition	Popular vote	% of vote	Seats	±	Gov't
URA–SD–SDP–AA–PD	4,962	42.7%	14	▲2	Yes
DPS–BS	2,108	18.2%	6	▼3	No
DUA–DSCG	2,037	17.5%	6	▲2	No
Forca	1,674	14.4%	5	▼3	Yes
DCG	829	7.1%	2	▲2	No

=== October elections ===
==== Budva ====
Party / Coalition	Popular vote	% of vote	Seats	±	Gov't
DF	5,690	49.5%	18	▲7	Yes
DPS–SD–SDP–LP–GI 21 May	3,077	26.8%	9	▼3	No
DCG–DEMOS	1,500	13.0%	4	▼2	Yes
URA	604	5.2%	1	Steady	Yes
SNP	401	3.5%	1	▼1	Yes
PCG	127	1.1%	0	▼1	—N/a
GA	99	0.9%	0	Steady	—N/a

==== Tivat ====
Party / Coalition	Popular vote	% of vote	Seats	±	Gov't
DPS–SD–SDP–LP	2,604	34.1%	12	▼2	No
NP–ES–DCG–DSS	2,196	28.7%	10	▼1	Yes
HGI	657	8.6%	3	▲1	No
DF	656	8.6%	3	▲3	Yes
KL	537	7.0%	2	new	Yes
TA–GB	333	4.4%	1	0	Yes
BF	306	4.0%	1	▼1	Yes
URA–SNP	185	2.4%	-	0	—N/a
AZT	170	2.2%	-	▼1	—N/a

==== Plužine ====
Party / Coalition	Popular vote	% of vote	Seats	±	Gov't
SNP	1,066	55.7%	17	▲1	Yes
NSD	394	20.6%	6	▲2	No
DCG–DSS	246	12.9%	4	Steady	No
DPS–SD	144	7.5%	2	▼4	No
URA	63	3.3%	1	new	No

==== Žabljak ====
Party / Coalition	Popular vote	% of vote	Seats	±	Gov't
DPS–SD	746	32.1%	10	▼7	No
DI	489	21.0%	6	new	Yes
DF	412	17.7%	5	Steady	Yes
DCG	376	16.2%	5	▼1	Yes
SNP	210	9.0%	3	Steady	Yes
PCG	92	4.0%	1	new	Yes

==== Bijelo Polje ====
Party / Coalition	Popular vote	% of vote	Seats	±	Gov't
DPS–SD–SDP–BPP-LP	9,607	38.6%	15	▼10	Yes
DF	3,510	14.1%	5	▲1	No
DCG–UCG	3,176	12.7%	5	▲2	No
BS	2,859	11.5%	4	▲2	Yes
ES	2,504	10.0%	4	new	No
SNP	1,500	6.0%	2	Steady	No
URA	1,255	5.0%	2	Steady	No
PCG	229	0.9%	-	Steady	—N/a
SPP	125	0.5%	-	Steady	—N/a
SSL	107	0.4%	-	new	—N/a
NGZ	45	0.2%	-	new	—N/a

==== Šavnik ====
Šavnik elections were particularly noteworthy due to a high amount of incidents and so called "Election Tourists" on the election day which prompted them to organize repeat elections the following Sunday. However, that one was also rendered invalid due to a large amount of incidents. This continued on for several more weeks before the municipal electoral body gave up and didn't organize any further repeat elections. As of December 2023, no outcome has been reached, and the pre-election government remains in power.

Party / Coalition	Popular vote	% of vote	Seats	±	Gov't
DCG–ES–UCG					
DF–SNP					
DPS–SD					

==== Bar ====
Party / Coalition	Popular vote	% of vote	Seats	±	Gov't
DPS–SDP–LP	8,267	37.6%	15	▼2	Yes
DCG–ES–UCG	4,014	18.2%	7	▲4	No
DF	2,698	12.3%	5	▲4	No
SD	2,290	10.4%	4	▼3	Yes
URA–Civis–AA	1,815	8.2%	3	▲2	No
BB	1,141	5.2%	2	▼3	No
BS	859	3.9%	1	Steady	No
SNP	425	1.9%	-	▼1	—N/a
PCG	375	1.7%	-	▼1	—N/a
SPP	123	0.6%	-	new	—N/a

==== Danilovgrad ====
Party / Coalition	Popular vote	% of vote	Seats	±	Gov't
DPS–SD–LP	2,495	27.1%	10	▼12	No
ES	2,110	22.9%	8	new	Yes
DF	1,361	14.8%	5	▲2	Yes
DCG–DSS	1,154	12.5%	4	▼1	Yes
URA	484	5.2%	2	▲1	Yes
SDP	364	3.9%	1	▲1	No
SNP	323	3.5%	1	Steady	Yes
Preokret	296	3.2%	1	new	No
UCG-PCG	288	3.1%	1	Steady	Yes
21 May	207	2.2%	-	new	—N/a
DNS	135	1.5%	-	new	—N/a

==== Kolašin ====
Party / Coalition	Popular vote	% of vote	Seats	±	Gov't
DPS–SDP–SD	1,334	29.5%	9	▼8	No
DCG–UCG–DSS	1,209	26.7%	9	▲3	Yes
DF	619	13.7%	4	▲1	Yes
ES	525	11.6%	3	new	Yes
SNP	404	8.9%	3	▲1	Yes
ZNK	269	5.9%	2	new	No
URA	161	3.6%	1	new	Yes

==== Podgorica ====
Party / Coalition	Popular vote	% of vote	Seats	±	Gov't
DPS–SDP–SD–LP–GI21M–BS–DUA	37,518	38.1%	24	▼11	No
ES	21,388	21.7%	13	new	Yes
DF–PCG–SCG	17,953	18.2%	11	▲5	Yes
DCG–UCG–Demos	10,628	10.8%	6	▼7	Yes
URA–Civis–AA	6,265	6.4%	4	▼1	Yes
SNP	2,719	2.8%	-	▼2	—N/a
PP	1,807	1.8%	-	new	—N/a
SSL	220	0.2%	-	new	—N/a

==== Plav ====
Party / Coalition	Popular vote	% of vote	Seats	±	Gov't
SD–SDP–DPS	2281	46.7%	16	▼3	Yes
BS	1046	21.4%	7	Steady	Yes
DF–PCG	648	13.3%	4	▲3	No
URA–AA	549	11.2%	3	▲2	No
SNP	219	4.5%	1	Steady	No
ES	140	2.9%	-	new	—N/a

==== Pljevlja ====
Party / Coalition	Popular vote	% of vote	Seats	±	Gov't
DF–SCG–RP	5,620	32.7%	12	▲8	Yes
DPS–BS–SD–SDP	4,584	26.7%	9	▼11	No
DCG–UCG–PP	3,545	20.6%	7	▼2	Yes
ES	2,136	12.4%	4	new	Yes
SNP–URA	1,176	6.8%	2	Steady	Yes
SPP	128	0.7%	0	Steady	—N/a

==== Rožaje ====
Party / Coalition	Popular vote	% of vote	Seats	±	Gov't
BS	7,138	57.9	22	▲3	Yes
DPS–SD–SDP–LP	2,830	23.0	8	▼7	No
URA	865	7.0	2	▲2	No
SPP	764	6.2	2	▲2	No
ES	277	2.3	0		—N/a
NSD–SNP	236	1.9	0		—N/a
DCG	216	1.7	0		—N/a

==== Zeta ====
Party / Coalition	Popular vote	% of vote	Seats	±	Gov't
DF–PCG–SCG	4.502	49.2%	16	new municipality	Yes
DPS–SD–SDP	2.335	25.5%	8	new municipality	No
DCG	1.933	21.1%	7	new municipality	Yes
SNP	384	4.2%	1	new municipality	Yes

== List of mayors and local governments ==
Municipality	Mayor before elections	Party	Mayor after elections	Party	Local government
Podgorica	Ivan Vuković	DPS	Olivera Injac	ES	ES-DF-DCG-URA
Bijelo Polje	Petar Smolović	DPS	Petar Smolović	DPS	DPS-SD-BS-SDP
Bar	Dušan Raičević	DPS	Dušan Raičević	DPS	DPS-SD-SDP
Pljevlja	Rajko Kovačević	DPS	Dario Vraneš	DF	DF-DCG–UCG–PP-ES
Berane	Tihomir Bogavac	SNP	Vuko Todorović	DF	DF-DCG-ES-UCG-PCG
Rožaje	Rahman Husović	BS	Rahman Husović	BS	BS
Ulcinj	Aleksandar Dabović	DPS	Omer Bajraktari	URA	URA-DP-SD-SDP-FORCA
Danilovgrad	Zorica Kovačević	DPS	Aleksandar Grgurović	ES	ES-DF-DCG-URA-SNP-UCG-PCG
Plav	Nihad Canović	SD	Nihad Canović	SD	SD-BS-SDP-DPS
Kolašin	Milosav Bulatović	DPS	Vladimir Martinović	DCG	DCG-UCG-DF-ES-SNP-URA
Žabljak	Veselin Vukićević	DPS	Radoš Žugić	DI	DI-DF-DCG-PCG
Plužine	Mijuško Bajagić	SNP	Slobodan Delić	SNP	SNP–URA
Šavnik	Velimir Perišić	DPS	TBA	TBA	DPS-SD
Budva	Marko Carević	DF	Milo Božović	DF	DF-DCG-URA-SNP
Tivat	Željko Komnenović	Ind.	Željko Komnenović	Ind.	NP–ES–DCG–DSS-DF-KL-TA–GB-BF
Zeta	Tanja Stajović	DPS	Mihailo Asanović	DF	DF-DCG-SNP
