= Ivan Vuković =

Ivan Vuković may refer to:

- Ivan Vuković (footballer)
- Ivan Vuković (politician)
