= Jovan Kavarić =

Montenegrin politician

Jovan Kavarić Јован Каварић

Mayor of Titograd
- In office 1989–1990
- Preceded by: Ratko Ivanović
- Succeeded by: Srđa Božović

Personal details
- Born: 1934 (age 91–92) Ponari, Zeta Banovina, Kingdom of Yugoslavia
- Education: University of Sarajevo (BM); University of Zagreb (MMed, MD)
- Occupation: clinical biochemist, politician

Jovan Kavarić (Montenegrin Cyrillic: Јован Каварић; born 1934 in Ponari, Zeta Banovina, Kingdom of Yugoslavia) is a Montenegrin clinical biochemist and politician.

Kavarić attended the University of Sarajevo - Faculty of Science in Sarajevo, and later finished the third degree of medical school at the University of Zagreb - School of Medicine in Zagreb. Kavarić later received his doctorate from the University of Zagreb - Faculty of Science.

Kavarić served as mayor of Titograd from 1989 to 1990.

Kavarić is currently a professor of biochemistry and clinical biochemistry at the University of Montenegro's Faculty of Science and Faculty of Medicine in Podgorica.
