= Ministry of Science (Montenegro) =

Government ministry of Montenegro

Ministry of Science and Technological Development
- Ministarstvo nauke i tehnološkog razvoja

Agency overview
- Formed: 2010
- Jurisdiction: Government of Montenegro
- Headquarters: Podgorica
- Agency executive: Biljana Šćepanović, Minister of Science
- Website: mna.gov.me

Minister of Science and Technological Development (Montenegrin: Ministar nauke) was the person in charge of the Ministry of Science and Technological Development of Montenegro (Ministarstvo nauke i tehnološkog razvoja). Prior to 2010, the Minister of Education and Science was in charge of science affairs. In 2020, Ministry once again merged into the Ministry of Education. It was once again re-established in 2022 as Ministry of Science and Technological Development.

== Ministers of Science (2010-2020) ==
Democratic Party of Socialists Non-partisan

Minister	Start of term	End of term
Sanja Vlahović	29 December 2010	28 November 2016
Sanja Damjanović	28 November 2016	4 December 2020
Biljana Šćepanović	28 April 2022	incumbent
