= Injac =

Injac (Serbian Cyrillic: Ињац) is a Serbian surname. Notable people with the surname include:

- Dimitrije Injac (born 1980), Serbian footballer
- Nenad Injac (born 1985), Serbian footballer
- Olivera Injac (born 1976) Montenegrin politician
- Teodora Injac (born 2000), Serbian chess player
