= Stevan Lukačević =

Montenegrin politician (1860–1932)

Stevan Lukačević Stevan Lukačević

Mayor of Podgorica
- In office 1893–1895
- Preceded by: Marko Pejanović
- Succeeded by: Stevan Raičković

Personal details
- Born: 1860
- Died: 1932 (aged 71–72)
- Occupation: politician, merchant, actor

Stevan "Saraga" Lukačević (Serbian Cyrillic: Стеван "Сарага" Лукачевић; 1860-1932) was a Montenegrin politician, merchant and actor. He served as mayor of Podgorica between 1893 and 1895.

He originally immigrated from Serbia to Podgorica. He produced pearl essence from the scales of bleaks. He dried the scales and exported large quantities of his product to Serbia.

Lukačević was one of the founders of the Podgorica Theater Society (Podgoričko pozorišno društvo).

Lukačević was featured in the play "Maksim Crnojević" (written by Serbian playwright Laza Kostić) in the title role as Maksim Crnojević. The play was performed in Podgorica ca. 5 April 1885 (Orthodox Easter). A writer for the Glas Crnogorca newspaper in Podgorica wrote in his report that despite the barriers of local dialects and the difficulty of fully mimicking everyone's movements, the actors played their roles fairly well. They also noted that foreigners watching the play could not believe that the actors were debutants.

Lukačević was a relative of Montenegrin king Nicholas I and a descendant of Serbian revolutionary Karađorđe Petrović.
