= Montenegrin European Party =

Montenegrin political party

Montenegrin European Party Crnogorska evropska stranka
- President: Novak Adžić
- Founded: September 2023; 22 months ago
- Headquarters: Podgorica
- Ideology: Montenegrin nationalism Pro-Europeanism
- Parliament: 0 / 81
- Mayors: 0 / 25
- Local Parliaments: 0 / 847

Website
- cepcg.eu

The Montenegrin European Party (Montenegrin: Crnogorska evropska stranka, CEP) is a political party in Montenegro, founded in November 2023 under the leadership of Montenegrin lawyer and historian Novak Adžić, a former member of the Social Democratic Party.

== Background ==
CEP was officially established on 30 September 2023, while the founding congress was held in Podgorica on 26 November 2023, where Adžić was unanimously elected as the first president of the party.

The party made its first electoral appearance at the local level in May 2024 at the Budva municipal election, where it failed to pass the electoral threshold, winning 2,14% of the votes.
