= Ponari =

Ponari Понари
- Village
- Location within Montenegro
- Country: Montenegro
- Municipality: Podgorica

Population (2011)
  - Total: 256
- Time zone: UTC+1 (CET)
  - Summer (DST): UTC+2 (CEST)

Ponari (Serbian Cyrillic: Понари) is a village in the new Zeta Municipality of Montenegro. Until 2022, it was part of Podgorica Municipality.

== Demographics ==
According to the 2011 census, its population was 256.

Ethnicity in 2011
Ethnicity	Number	Percentage
Montenegrins	214	83.6%
Serbs	35	13.7%
other/undeclared	7	2.7%
Total	256	100%
