= Iko Mirković =

Montenegrin politician and historian

Iko Mirković Ико Мирковић

Mayor of Titograd
- In office 1953–1957
- Preceded by: Periša Vujošević
- Succeeded by: Branko Nilević

Personal details
- Born: 30.11.1918 Podgorica
- Died: 02.08.2002
- Party: League of Communists of Montenegro
- Occupation: politician, historian

Iko Mirkovic (Cyrillic: Ико Мирковић) was a Montenegrin politician and historian. He served as the mayor of Titograd from February 1, 1954, until April 1, 1958. Before this appointment Mirkovic served as the political secretary of KPJ in Titograd from 1 August 1949 to 31 October 1951. He was a member of the Parliament Executive Council of SR Montenegro from 1959 to 1960.

Leaving the position in Titograd, Mirkovic moved to Belgrade where he served as the Chairman of The Social and Healthcare council in the Federal Parliament from June 1967 to June 1969. He served as a member of the Federal Parliament of SFRY from 1 June 1969 to 31 May 1974. After his appointment in the parliament Mirkovic became the secretary general of the Federal Partisans' Veterans Organization of Yugoslavia (Savezni odbor SUBNOR) from June 1969 to 20 October 1978.

Following the position of the secretary general, Mirkovic was a member of the Federal advising council of SFRY (Savet Federacije SFRJ) and Federal Parliament of SFRY from which he retired on 30 November 1984. He died in Belgrade on 2 August 2002.

Mirkovic was decorated multiple times by Yugoslav and foreign governments. Decorations include Order of the Yugoslav Flag with Sash (I rank); Order of the Republic with Golden Wreath (I rank); Order of Brotherhood and Unity with Golden Wreath (I rank); Order of Labor with Red Banner (I rank); Commemorative Medal of the Partisans of 1941 (among first 100 recipients - medal No. below 100).

== Bibliography ==
- What National Liberation Front's Victory Means to the Youth (Šta znači pobjeda narodnog fronta za omladinu), Belgrade, 1945
- Speeches and Articles (Govori i članci), Belgrade, 1978
- Friends of My Youth (Drugovi moje mladosti), Gornji Milanovac, 1978
- Budo Tomović: Life's Road and Revolutionary Work (Budo Tomović: Životni put i revolucionarno djelo), Gornji Milanovac, 1978
- Blažo Jovanović: Life's Road and Revolutionary Work (Blažo Jovanović: Životni put i revolucionarno djelo), Gornji Milanovac, 1981
- Soldiers of NOR Yugoslavia and Their Organisation (Borci NOR Jugoslaviji i njihova organizacija), Belgrade, 1987
- Unforgettable Legends (Zapisi za nezaborav), Podgorica, 1996
- Podgorica Printing Press and Periodical "Zeta" by Jovan-Jozo Vukčević: 1930-1941 (Podgorička štamparija i list "Zeta" Jovana-Joza Vukčevića: 1930–1941), Podgorica, 1998
