= Pažin =

Pažin may refer to:

- Đorđe Pažin (born 2001), Serbian basketball player
- Predrag Pažin (born 1973), Bulgarian footballer
- Zoran Pažin (born 1966), Montenegrin politician
