= North East Students' Organization =

Indian student organisation

- Abbreviation: NESO
- Formation: 1979; 47 years ago
- Type: Student organisation
- Headquarters: Shillong, Meghalaya, India
- Region served: Northeastern India
- Chairman: Samuel B Jyrwa
- Secretary General: Mutsikhoyo Yhobu

The North East Students' Organization (NESO) is an umbrella body of student organisations from the states of Northeast India, established in 1979 and headquartered in Shillong, Meghalaya. It campaigns on the rights, culture, and development of the region's indigenous communities, particularly on questions of immigration and demographic change.

As of 2022, its chairman is Samuel B. Jyrwa, who was re-elected that year, and its secretary general is Mutsikhoyo Yhobu

== Activities ==
NESO had opposed the Citizenship Amendment Act (CAA), holding demonstrations against it over its alleged expected effect on the region's demographics. It has raised concerns about illegal immigration and border security, including an appeal to Union Home Minister Amit Shah to prevent unauthorised entry from Bangladesh. In 2024, it urged Prime Minister Narendra Modi to visit Manipur during the state's ethnic violence. NESO has also lobbied for the inclusion of Northeast Indian history in school syllabuses, and in 2024 announced a scheme to sponsor sixteen students from indigenous communities each year.

== Member organisations ==
NESO comprises eight member student organisations.

- All Assam Students' Union (AASU)
- Khasi Students' Union (KSU)
- Garo Students' Union (GSU)
- All Manipur Students' Union (AMSU)
- Mizo Zirlai Pawl (MZP)
- Naga Students' Federation (NSF)
- All Arunachal Pradesh Students' Union (AAPSU)
- Twipra Students' Federation (TSF)

== See also ==
- Student activism
