= National Security Agency (Montenegro) =

Montenegrin governmental agency

- Agencija za Nacionalnu Bezbjednost
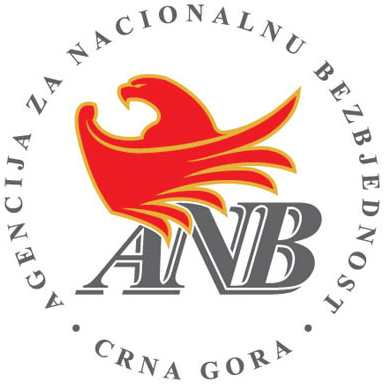

Agency overview
- Formed: May 5, 2005 as the National Security Agency
- Preceding agency: State Security Service (in FR Yugoslavia)
- Jurisdiction: Montenegro
- Headquarters: Bulevar Revolucije 1, Podgorica
- Employees: 245 (December 2015)
- Annual budget: 6,6 million € (December 2015)
- Agency executive: Vacant, Director of the National Security Agency
- Website: www.anb.gov.me

The National Security Agency (Montenegrin: Agencija za Nacionalnu Bezbjednost; ANB) is the national intelligence agency of Montenegro. Its headquarters are located in Podgorica.

According to the law governing ANB, the agency is tasked with collecting, storing, analyzing, assessing, exchanging and guarding

- Intelligence on activities aimed against independence, sovereignty, territorial integrity, security and constitutional order of Montenegro
- Intelligence pertaining to defense interests of Montenegro, and accomplishment of strategic defense goals and interests of Montenegro (intelligence and counterintelligence activities in the defense field)
- Intelligence on terrorism activities
- Intelligence on organized crime activities
- Intelligence on gravest forms of crimes against humanity and other assets protected by international law
- Intelligence on foreign intelligence assets, when pertaining to Montenegrin national security
- Intelligence on potential threats to Montenegrin economic interests
- Intelligence on potential threats to international security
- Intelligence on other forms of threats to national security of Montenegro

ANB is also responsible for counterintelligence protection of Parliament of Montenegro, Government of Montenegro, President of Montenegro, and other Government bodies and ministries, pertaining to activities significant to security of personnel, buildings and assets of aforementioned institutions.

== History ==
Contemporary history of state intelligence in Montenegro can be traced to 13 May 1944, when OZNA was formed, as part of Yugoslav People's Army, with autonomous center of territorial intelligence in Montenegro. OZNA was split from the Army in March 1946, and incorporated in Ministry of Interior, thus becoming civilian intelligence agency. Within the Yugoslav army, KOS was formed as military counterintelligence agency, while civilian branch (now attached to Ministry of Interior) was renamed UDB.

In May 2005, National Security Agency was formed as a separate Government agency, inheriting the employees and assets from Montenegrin UDB.

In June 2014, the Associated Press (AP) published a statement made by an unnamed NATO source that between 25 and 50 Montenegrin intelligence officers had close links to Russia, a report that was denied by the Montenegrin officials; a Montenegrin political analyst commented that against the backdrop of talk about the country's Euro-Atlantic integration, Russian tycoons were unhindered in taking over state resources through a network of organized crime and corruption.

In 2021 an official investigation was launched under the suspicion that the Agency has illegally followed opposition members and journalists only to later destroy all the documents related to the alleged events.

== Directors ==
- Duško Marković (28 May 2005 – 1 August 2010)
- Vladan Joković (1 August 2010 – 26 December 2011)
- Boro Vučinić (1 March 2012 – 12 March 2015)
- Dejan Peruničić (20 August 2015 – 17 December 2020)
- Dejan Vukšić (17 December 2020 – 5 May 2022)
- Savo Kentera (5 May 2022 – 7 October 2022)
- Vacant (7 October 2022–present)
