= Marko Milačić =

Montenegrin politician

Marko Milačić Марко Милачић
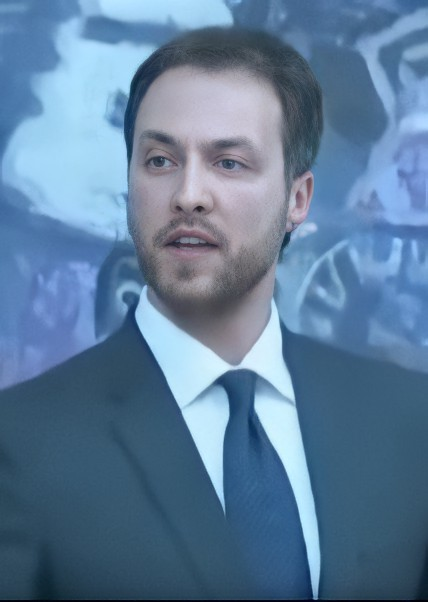
- Marko Milačić in December 2020

Member of Parliament
- Incumbent
- Assumed office 30 August 2020 - 11 June 2023

Personal details
- Born: 22 May 1985 (age 41) Titograd, SFR Yugoslavia (now Montenegro)
- Party: True Montenegro (2018–2025); NSD (2025–present)
- Education: University of Montenegro
- Profession: Journalist, activist, politician

Marko Milačić (Serbian Cyrillic: Марко Милачић; born 22 May 1985) is a Montenegrin politician. He was the founder and current president of minor right-wing populist political party True Montenegro. He ran for president of Montenegro in the 2018 election, and received 2.8% of the popular vote.

== Biography ==
Milačić completed elementary and secondary school in Podgorica, graduated and obtained a master's degree in journalism at the Faculty of Political Sciences of the University of Montenegro. He is fluent in Serbian and English. Milačić worked for the Montenegrin national public service (RTCG) as a reporter and news presenter for several years.

== Political career ==
In 2014, Milačić became one of the founders of the non-governmental organization Movement for Neutrality of Montenegro.

Through the years he maintained cooperation with a number of populist politicians and activists, such as Croatian Human Shield founders Ivan Pernar and Ivan Vilibor Sinčić, Bosnian conceptual artist Damir Nikšić and Serbian-Canadian film director and right-wing political activist Boris Malagurski.

He decided to enter political life in 2016 by joining the newly founded Mladen Bojanić's Resistance to Hopelessness (OB), an anti-establishment and anti-NATO political movement, and become member of Democratic Front (DF) electoral list for 2016 parliamentary election, but failed to enter the Parliament. After Bojanić's abandonment of OB in 2017, Milačić became de facto leader of movement. In February 2018, he established the populist political party True Montenegro and ran as the party's candidate for President of Montenegro in the April 2018 elections; he received 2.8% of the votes.

On December 18, 2025 Milačić had joined the New Serb Democracy.

== See also ==
- Montenegrin presidential election, 2018
- Montenegrin parliamentary election, 2020
