= Party of European Progress =

Montenegrin political party

Party of European Progress Stranka evropskog progresa
- Abbreviation: SEP
- President: Duško Marković
- Founders: Duško Marković; Sanja Damjanović
- Founded: 24 June 2024; 9 months ago
- Split from: Democratic Party of Socialists
- Headquarters: Podgorica
- Ideology: Pro-Europeanism
- Colours: Blue; Orange
- Parliament: 0 / 81
- Mayors: 0 / 25
- Local Parliaments: 5 / 847

Website
- evropskiprogres.me

The Party of European Progress (Montenegrin: Stranka evropskog progresa, SEP) is a political party in Montenegro. It was founded in June 2024 by the former prime minister and high-ranking member of the Democratic Party of Socialists (DPS) Duško Marković.

== History ==
In June 2024, Vijesti revealed that the former prime minister and high-ranking member of the Democratic Party of Socialists (DPS) Duško Marković will soon be founding the Party of European Progress along with other notable political figures in Montenegro such as former minister Sanja Damjanović.

On 24 June 2024, the Party of European Progress was officially announced and founded. Marković stated that the party is "committed to the European path of Montenegro".
