= Nešo Šćepović =

Montenegrin businessman and politician

Nešo Šćepović Нешо Шћеповић

Mayor of Podgorica
- In office 1925–1940
- Preceded by: Ljubomir Krunić
- Succeeded by: Dimitrije Begović

Personal details
- Party: People's Radical Party

Nešo Šćepović (Serbian Cyrillic: Нешо Шћеповић, pronounced [něːʃo ʃt͡ɕêpoʋit͡ɕ]) was a Yugoslav and Montenegrin businessman and politician, serving as the Mayor of Podgorica between 1925 and 1940.

Šćepović was one of the wealthiest citizens of Podgorica and was nicknamed "Pauper's Mother" (sirotinjska majka) by its residents because he provided his own food and money to the poor. His huge popularity among the people was manifested in the fact that the People's Radical Party, of which he was a member, always won the elections in Podgorica.

He was the second president of the Commerce-industrial and handicraft chamber (predecessor of the Montenegrin Chamber of Economy). In 1929, upon the establishment of Zeta Banate, he led the delegation of citizens of Podgorica to King Alexander. The role of the delegation was to convince the king to grant Podgorica the status of the capital city of the newly formed Banate of Zeta. The king refused and the administrative seat became Cetinje, the old royal capital of Montenegro.

Nešo Šćepović was responsible for commissioning more buildings in Podgorica than in past decades.

He was declared an enemy by the Yugoslav Partisans, and his holdings were subsequently confiscated by the state.
