= Duško Marković =

Prime Minister of Montenegro from 2016 to 2020

- Душко Марковић
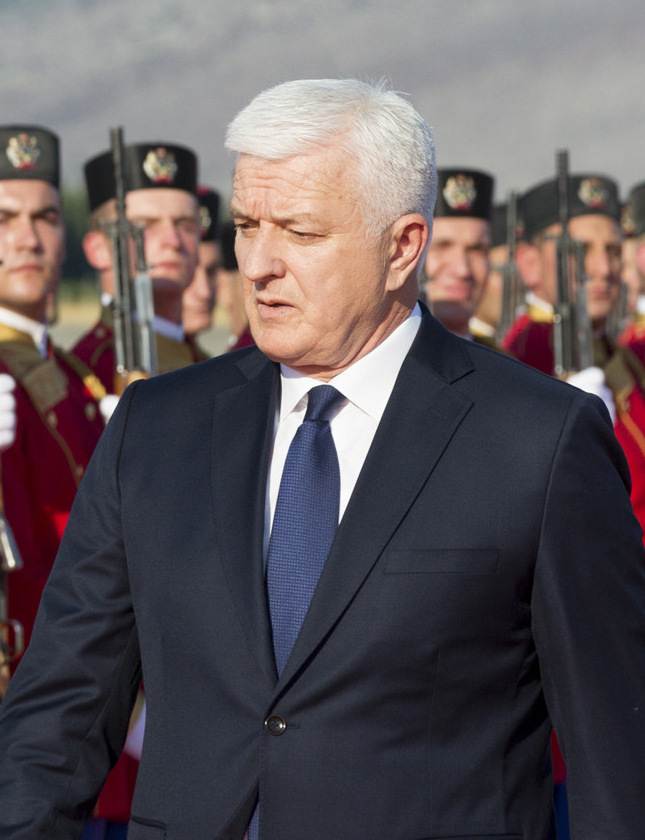
- Marković in 2017

Member of Parliament
- Incumbent
- Assumed office 23 September 2020
- President: Aleksa Bečić

Prime Minister of Montenegro
- In office 28 November 2016 – 4 December 2020
- President: Filip Vujanović; Milo Đukanović
- Preceded by: Milo Đukanović
- Succeeded by: Zdravko Krivokapić

Deputy Prime Minister of Montenegro
- In office 29 December 2010 – 28 November 2016
- Prime Minister: Igor Lukšić; Milo Đukanović
- Preceded by: Igor Lukšić
- Succeeded by: Zoran Pažin

Minister of Justice of Montenegro
- In office 29 December 2010 – 12 May 2016
- Prime Minister: Igor Lukšić; Milo Đukanović
- Preceded by: Miraš Radović
- Succeeded by: Zoran Pažin

Head of the National Security Agency
- In office 5 May 2005 – 29 December 2010
- Prime Minister: Milo Đukanović; Željko Šturanović
- Preceded by: Position established
- Succeeded by: Vladan Joković

Personal details
- Born: 6 July 1959 (age 67) Mojkovac, SR Montenegro, SFR Yugoslavia
- Party: SKJ (until 1991); DPS (1991–2024); SEP (2024–present)
- Education: University of Kragujevac

Duško Marković (Montenegrin Cyrillic: Душко Марковић; born 6 July 1959) is a Montenegrin politician who served as the prime minister from 2016 to 2020. Formerly a high-ranking member of the Democratic Party of Socialists (DPS), he is now the president of the Party of European Progress (SEP).

== Early and personal life ==
Marković was born on 6 July 1959 in Mojkovac, Yugoslavia. He finished elementary and middle school in Mojkovac, and graduated in law at the University of Kragujevac. After he graduated from Kragujevac, he began working in legal consulting for the Brskovo mine in Mojkovac. He is married and has three children.

== Political career ==
In 1986, Marković was appointed secretary of the municipal assembly of Mojkovac, and mayor in 1989. He left the post in 1991 to be appointed Secretary-General of the Montenegrin government led by Milo Đukanović within Yugoslavia. In 1997, he was elected to the Montenegrin Assembly, and the following year he became assistant Minister of the Interior, in charge of the State Security Service.

During his time in the State Security Service, the editor-in-chief of daily newspaper Dan, Duško Jovanović, was killed on 27 May 2004. In 2014, Marković was sued for concealing information which may have exposed Jovanović's killers. Jovanović's wife testified in court that Marković threatened to kill Jovanović during a phone call in April 2003, the same month the Dan office was set on fire.

In 2005, following the establishment of the new National Security Agency (ANB) in May that year, Marković was appointed by Parliament to head the agency, a position he held until 2010. In 2010, Igor Lukšić's government appointed him first as a minister without portfolio, then as deputy prime minister and Justice Minister. In March 2012, he was appointed Minister of Human and Minority Rights. He left the government in 2015 and the same year the congress of the ruling Democratic Party of Socialists (DPS) elected him Deputy president of the party. In 2016, he was again appointed the Minister of the Justice in Provisional government.

On 25 October 2016, ten days after the parliamentary election, the DPS bureau chose Marković to replace Milo Đukanović as prime minister. His nomination was condemned by the opposition, who accused Marković of involvement in corruption scandals and of omission of information in the inquiry about the murder of Duško Jovanović in 2004.

== Prime minister ==
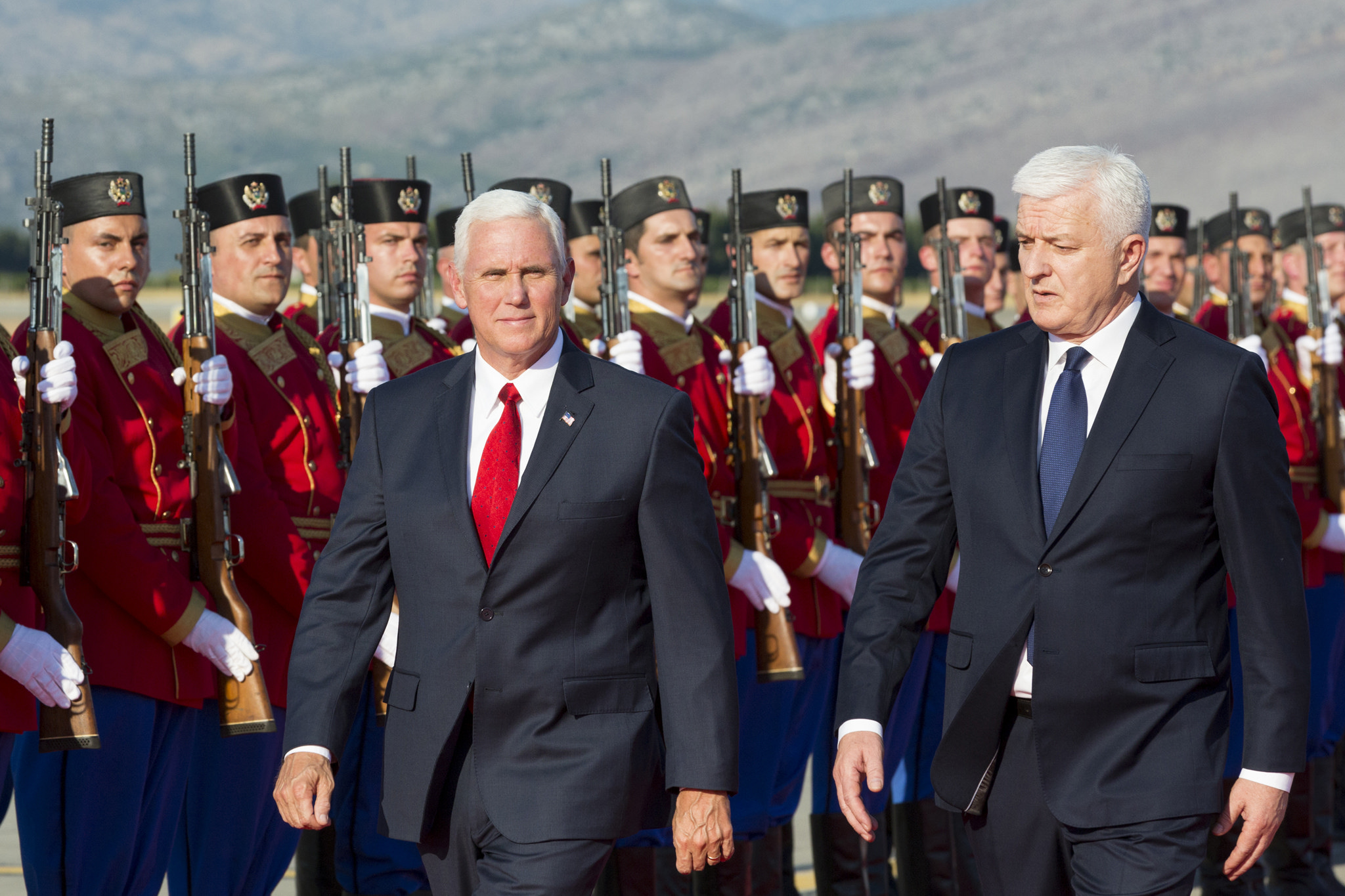
Marković with US Vice President Mike Pence, Podgorica, 1 August 2017

On 9 November 2016, Marković was nominated as prime minister by the president of Montenegro Filip Vujanović, and on 28 November he was confirmed by 41 out of 81 members of the parliament (with the opposition boycotting the assembly), with the support of the Albanian, Croat and Bosniak minority parties.

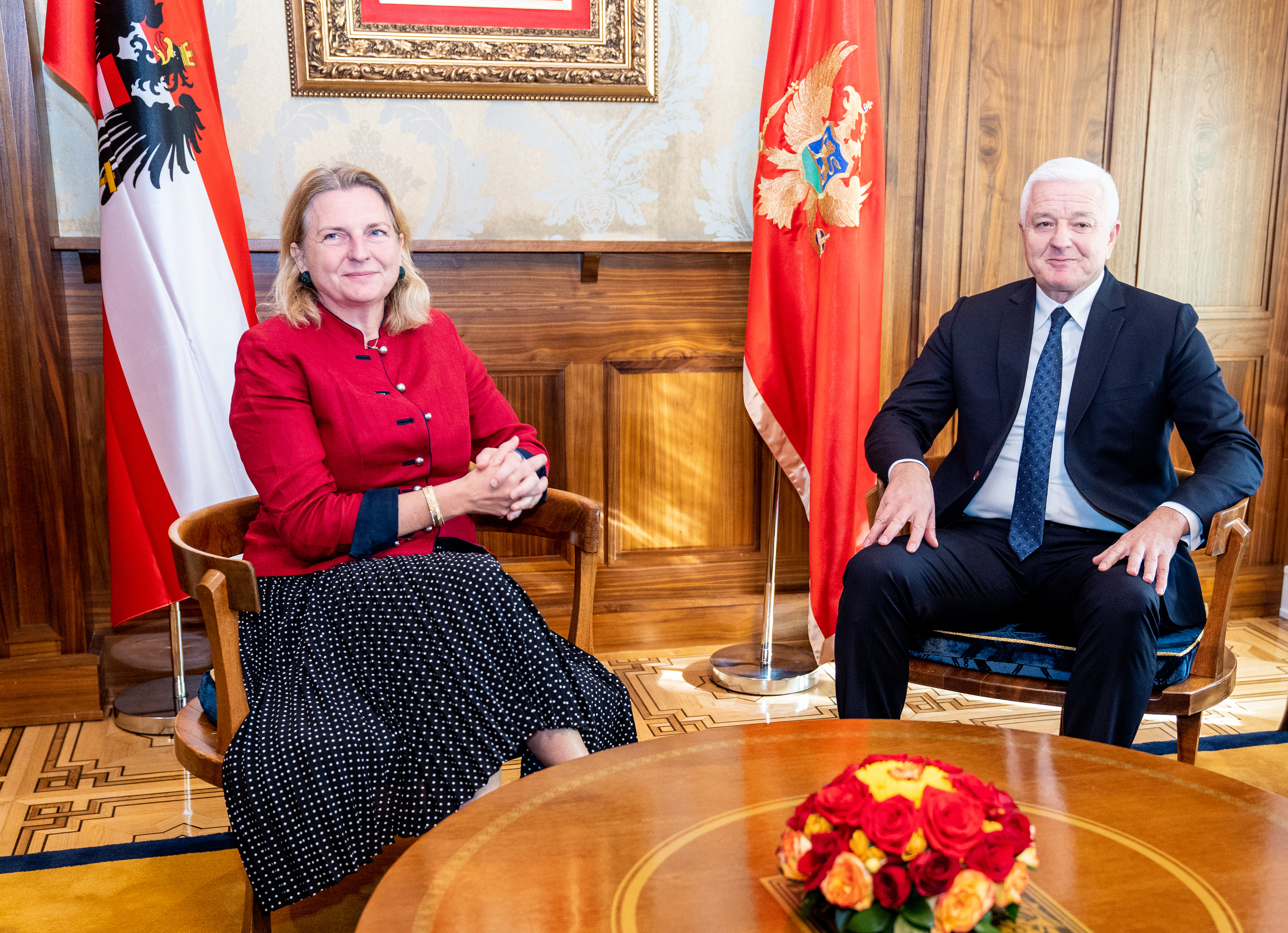
Marković and Austrian Foreign Minister Karin Kneissl in Podgorica, on 5 October 2018

On 25 May 2017, Marković made headlines around the world when the United States president Donald Trump appeared to brusquely shove him aside to get in front of him at a photo op during a NATO summit meeting, which was attended by Montenegro for the first time, days prior to its formal accession to the alliance. Later, Marković responded to questions about the incident by shrugging it off.

On 10 October 2018, Marković expressed his support for amendments on the Law on State Symbols and Day of Statehood, which would penalize those who don't stand up for the Montenegrin national anthem by up to €2,000. The amendment included tiers depending on the subject's occupation, with penalties for businessmen up to €6,000, and up to €20,000 for those working in the legal system.

"Who ever doesn't stand up for the anthem must pay a penalty. We won't force anyone to stand up. And every time when someone doesn't stand they will pay a penalty if we find out they didn't stand" - Duško Marković responding to journalists in Golubovci on 10 October 2018.

When a journalist asked Marković whether the amendments could be enforced, Marković suggested that it could be enforced at stadiums, saying that "everyone will be watching, every institution which bears a flag, every citizen who loves this country. And of course state agencies, inspection agencies. Whoever we recognize at the stadium who wouldn't stand, if we identify them we'll file a charge."

Protests against corruption within Marković-led government have started in February 2019 soon after the revelation of footage and documents that appear to implicate top officials in obtaining suspicious funds for the ruling Democratic Party of Socialists 2016 parliamentary election campaign.

As of late December 2019, the newly proclaimed religion law which de jure transfers the ownership of church buildings and estates from the Serbian Orthodox Church in Montenegro to the Montenegrin state, sparked a series of massive protests followed with road blockages, which continued to 2020.

In June 2024, Marković left DPS and founded the Party of European Progress (SEP).

Political offices
Preceded by Milo Đukanović	Prime Minister of Montenegro; 2016–2020	Succeeded by Zdravko Krivokapić
