= Municipalities of Montenegro =

Municipalities Opštine Општине
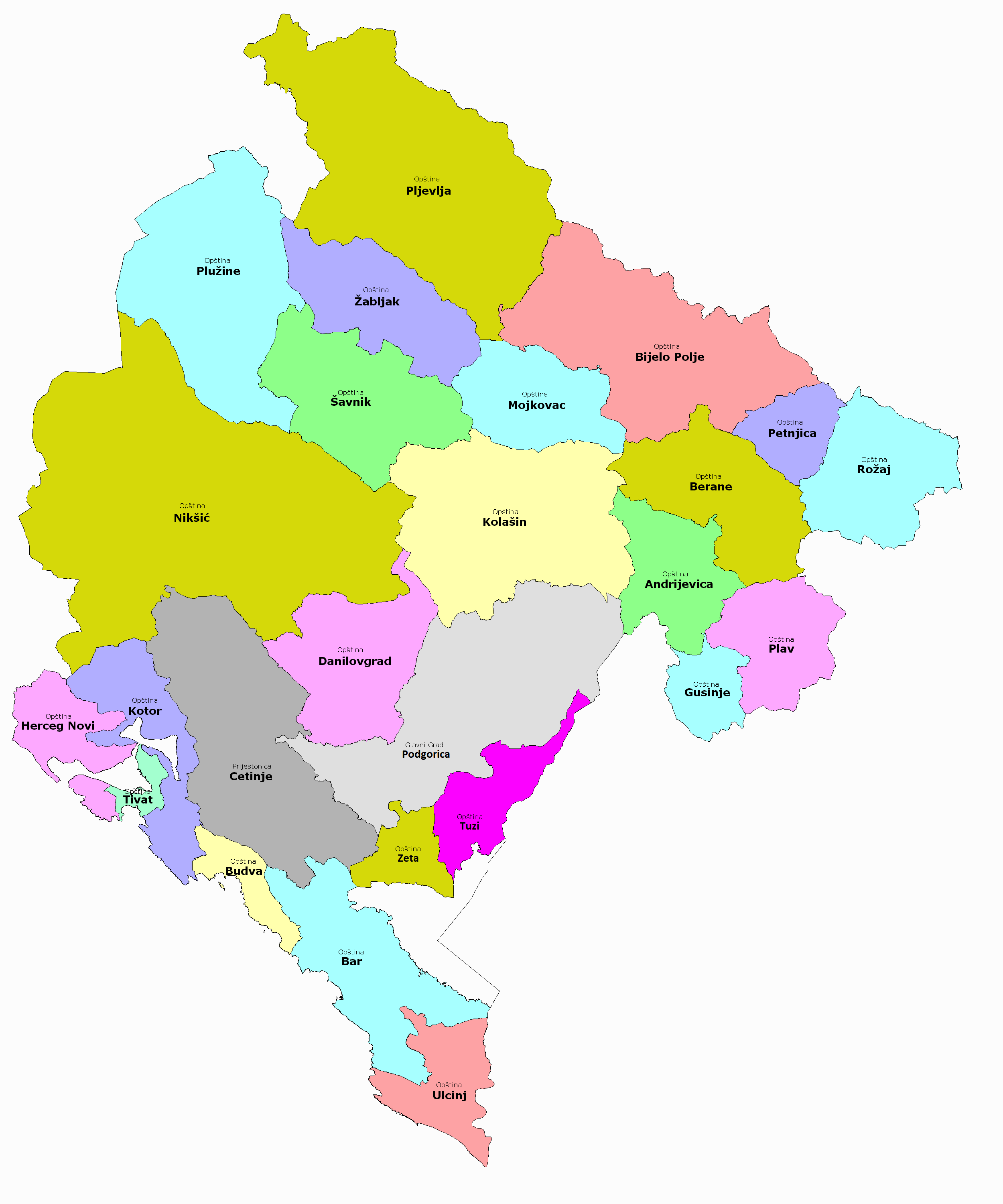
- Map of the municipalities of Montenegro
- Category: Unitary state
- Location: Montenegro
- Number: 25 municipalities (as of 2022)
- Populations: 1,569 (Šavnik) to 179,505 (Podgorica)
- Areas: 46 km^{2} (18 sq mi) (Tivat) to 2,065 km^{2} (797 sq mi) (Nikšić)
- Government: Local government
- Subdivisions: None

The municipalities (Montenegrin: opštine / општине, singular: opština / општина) are the first level administrative subdivisions of Montenegro. The country is divided into 25 municipalities including the Old Royal Capital Cetinje and the Podgorica Capital City. Podgorica is divided into one subdivision called city municipality (Montenegrin: gradska opština / градска општина, plural: gradske opštine / градске општине), forming the most basic level of local government.

Recently created:

- Petnjica Municipality (2013)
- Gusinje Municipality (2014)
- Tuzi Municipality (2018)
- Zeta Municipality (2022)

The Union of Municipalities of Montenegro is a national association of local authorities of Montenegro.

The next Montenegrin municipal elections are scheduled for 2027.

== List ==
#	Coat of arms	Municipality	Area		Population (2023)		Density	Predominant ethnicity (2023)	Predominant language (2023)	Predominant religion (2023)
#	Coat of arms	Municipality	km^{2}	Rank	Total	Rank	Pop/km^{2}	Predominant ethnicity (2023)	Predominant language (2023)	Predominant religion (2023)
1		Andrijevica	283	17	3,910	22	14	Serb (67.52%)	Serbian (75.55%)	Eastern Orthodox (97.75%)
2		Bar	598	8	45,812	3	77	Montenegrin (42.26%)	Montenegrin (40.25%)	Eastern Orthodox (55.02%)
3		Berane	544	10	24,645	7	45	Serb (59.82%)	Serbian (69.15%)	Eastern Orthodox (82.71%)
4		Bijelo Polje	924	4	38,662	4	42	Serb (43.13%)	Serbian (48.15%)	Eastern Orthodox (54.20%)
5		Budva	122	24	27,445	6	225	Serb (35.79%)	Serbian (43.73%)	Eastern Orthodox (84.26%)
6		Cetinje	899	5	14,494	15	16	Montenegrin (91.07%)	Montenegrin (85.77%)	Eastern Orthodox (91.83%)
7		Danilovgrad	501	11	18,617	12	37	Montenegrin (57.31%)	Serbian (50.64%)	Eastern Orthodox (93.09%)
8		Gusinje	157	22	3,933	21	25	Bosniak (57.13%)	Bosnian (50.72%)	Sunni Islam (92.55%)
9		Herceg Novi	235	20	30,824	5	131	Serb (48.34%)	Serbian (57.65%)	Eastern Orthodox (83.67%)
10		Kolašin	897	6	6,700	19	7	Montenegrin (52.07%)	Serbian (58.25%)	Eastern Orthodox (94.85%)
11		Kotor	335	15	22,746	10	68	Montenegrin (46.43%)	Serbian (43.63%)	Eastern Orthodox (79.72%)
12		Mojkovac	367	14	6,728	18	18	Montenegrin (54.01%)	Serbian (57.05%)	Eastern Orthodox (96.98%)
13		Nikšić	2,065	1	65,705	2	32	Montenegrin (59.46%)	Serbian (49.48%)	Eastern Orthodox (93.25%)
14		Petnjica	173	21	4,957	20	29	Bosniak (83.96%)	Bosnian (62.09%)	Sunni Islam (98.47%)
15		Plav	328	16	9,050	17	28	Bosniak (65.64%)	Bosnian (60.53%)	Sunni Islam (79.16%)
16		Pljevlja	1,346	3	24,134	8	18	Serb (66.41%)	Serbian (72.92%)	Eastern Orthodox (80.09%)
17		Plužine	854	7	2,177	24	3	Serb (74.46%)	Serbian (84.47%)	Eastern Orthodox (98.16%)
18		Podgorica	1,052	2	179,505	1	125	Montenegrin (54.54%)	Serbian (44.81%)	Eastern Orthodox (79.77%)
19		Rožaje	432	13	23,184	9	54	Bosniak (84.66%)	Bosnian (74.05%)	Sunni Islam (96.52%)
20		Šavnik	553	9	1,569	25	3	Montenegrin (50.54%)	Serbian (54.88%)	Eastern Orthodox (97.77%)
21		Tivat	46	25	16,338	13	355	Serb (34.47%)	Serbian (40.55%)	Eastern Orthodox (68.15%)
22		Tuzi	236	19	12,979	16	55	Albanian (62.55%)	Albanian (60.25%)	Sunni Islam (54.68%)
23		Ulcinj	255	18	20,507	11	80	Albanian (73.53%)	Albanian (74.28%)	Sunni Islam (76.90%)
24		Žabljak	445	12	2,941	23	7	Serb (52.64%)	Serbian (67.19%)	Eastern Orthodox (96.63%)
25		Zeta	153	23	16,071	14	110	Montenegrin (49.81%)	Serbian (63.79%)	Eastern Orthodox (95.86%)

== Politics ==
List of current mayors and local governments
Democratic Party of Socialists (4)
New Serb Democracy (3)
Democratic Montenegro (3)
Europe Now! (2)
Socialist People's Party (2)
Bosniak Party (2)
Social Democrats (1)
Albanian Alternative (1)
Social Democratic Party (1)
New Democratic Force (1)
Democratic People's Party (1)
Durmitorska Inicijativa (1)
Independent (3)

Municipality	Current Mayor	Party	Local government	Elected
Podgorica	Saša Mujović	PES	PES–DCG–ZBCG–PzPG–SNP–UCG	2024
Nikšić	Marko Kovačević	NSD	ZBCG–PES–SNP–DCG–UCG–SCG	2025
Bijelo Polje	Petar Smolović	DPS	DPS–SD–SDP–BS	2022
Bar	Dušan Raičević	DPS	DPS–SD–SDP	2022
Herceg Novi	Stevan Katić	DCG	DCG–NL–ZBCG	2025
Pljevlja	Dario Vraneš	NSD	ZBCG–PES–DCG–SNP	2022
Berane	Đole Lutovac	PES	PES–SNP–ZBCG–DCG–BS–UCG–SCG	2024
Rožaje	Rahman Husović	BS	BS	2022
Kotor	Vladimir Jokić	DCG	DCG–PES–ZBCG–GL–DA–KP	2024
Ulcinj	Genci Nimanbegu	Forca	Forca–SD–SDP–PD–DPS–BS	2022
Budva	Nikola Jovanović	Ind.	BNG–DPS–SDP–SD	2024
Danilovgrad	Aleksandar Grgurović	Ind.	PES–ZBCG–DCG–UCG–URA–SNP	2022
Cetinje	Nikola Đurašković	SDP	SDP–SG LSCG	2021
Tivat	Željko Komnenović	Ind.	Independent lists	2022
Tuzi	Nik Gjeloshaj	AA	AA–DS–DCG	2023
Plav	Nihad Canović	SD	SD–DPS–SDP–BS	2022
Mojkovac	Vesko Delić	NSD	ZBCG–DCG–SNP–URA	2021
Kolašin	Petko Bakić	DCG	DCG–ZBCG–PES–SNP–URA–UCG	2022
Petnjica	Erol Muratović	DPS	DPS–SD–BS	2021
Andrijevica	Željko Ćulafić	SNP	SNP–PES–ZBCG–DCG–VPZU	2024
Gusinje	Sanel Balić	BS	BS–SD–SDP–PZG–DCG	2024
Žabljak	Radoš Žugić	DI	DI–ZBCG–DCG	2022
Plužine	Slobodan Delić	SNP	SNP	2022
Šavnik	Jugoslav Jakić	DPS	DPS–SD	2022
Zeta	Mihailo Asanović	DNP	ZBCG–SNP–DCG	2022

=== Local parliaments of Montenegro ===
Number of mandates per party in local parliaments
Democratic Party of Socialists	223
For the Future of Montenegro	115
Democratic Montenegro	93
Europe Now	56
Socialist People's Party	56
Bosniak Party	54
Social Democrats	41
United Reform Action	27
Social Democratic Party	26
Albanian Alternative	14
United Montenegro	11
Novska List	10
Movement for Changes	7
Democratic League of Albanians	7
Democratic Union of Albanians	7
Tivat Action	6
Democratic Party	5
New Democratic Force	5
I Choose Montenegro	5
Liberal Party	4
Others	72
Reference: (last updated after April 2025 municipal elections)

== See also ==
- List of regions of Montenegro
- Cities and towns of Montenegro
- Populated places of Montenegro
- Subdivisions of Montenegro
- ISO 3166-2:ME
