= Dejan Vukšić =

Montenegrin lawyer and politician

Dejan Vukšić (Serbian Cyrillic: Дејан Вукшић; born 2 May 1972) is a Montenegrin lawyer and an independent politician serving as director of the National Security Agency since 17 December 2020. Prior to this, he served as the president of the Municipal Assembly of Kotor from 28 October 2020 to 17 December 2020.

== Biography ==
Vukšić was born to a Montenegrin family on 2 May 1972 in Kotor, in the then SR Montenegro, and SFR Yugoslavia. He graduated from the Faculty of Law, University of Montenegro in 1996, and completed the bar exam in 1999.

In the period from 1998 to 1999, he was an associate in the Basic Court in Kotor, while from 1999 to 2001 he worked as a judge in the same court.

Since 2001, he is a lawyer, member of the Bar Association and the Board of Directors of the Bar Association of Montenegro.

He is the founder and owner of the law firm "Vukšić".

He headed the electoral list For the Future of Kotor at the 2020 Montenegrin municipal elections and was elected President of the Municipal Assembly of Kotor after the elections. Shortly after, on 17 December 2020, Vukšić was named the acting director of the National Security Agency.

He is married and has two children, and in addition to his native Serbian, he also speaks English.
