= Sanja Damjanović =

Montenegrin physicist

Sanja Damjanović (Serbian Cyrillic: Сања Дамјановић; born June 5, 1972) is a physicist from Montenegro and was minister of science in the government of Montenegro from 2016 until 2020.

== Biography ==
Sanja Damjanović finished the extended school in 1991 and studied physics at the University of Belgrade until 1995. Her master was related to theoretical particle physics and gravitation. She did work as assistant teacher at the University of Montenegro (UCG) from 1997 to 1998.

Starting in 1999 she did her doctoral thesis under supervision of recognized physicist Hans Joachim Specht (former scientific CEO of the German GSI Helmholtz Centre for Heavy Ion Research (GSI)) at the Ruprecht-Karls-University (RKU) in Heidelberg by searching "Electron-Pair Production in Pb-Au Collisions at 40 AGeV" within the Čerenkov Ring Electron Spectrometer (CERES/NA45-2) experiment at the accelerator Super Proton Synchrotron (SPS) at CERN, Geneva. She received her PhD in 2002 with magna cum laude.

By 2003 she continued as a Postdoc at CERN within a cooperation treaty between RKU und GSI at the NA60 experiment, searching for "prompt dimuon and charm production with proton and heavy ion beams". In 2006 she continued with a CERN Fellowship, after 2009 as scientific associate in different research programs as basic research, in experimental physics of high energetic atomic nucleus collisions and in applied research for high radiation fields created by high accelerated particle beams. In 2007 Damjanović played a key role in initiating an international cooperation agreement between Montenegro and CERN.

Starting in 2014 she returned to Darmstadt for a position in a group working for radiation detection and diagnosis in the accelerator division of the GSI Helmholtz Centre for Heavy Ion Research and was delegated back to CERN in 2015. Damjanović has more than 100 publications in refereed journals and conference proceedings.

Damjanović was appointed as Minister of Science in the Government of Montenegro as a member of the Democratic Party of Socialists of Montenegro (DPS) in autumn 2016. Following an initiative by Montenegro in March 2017, she politically pushed the creation of the 'South East European International Institute for Sustainable Technologies' (SEEIIST) from early 2017 onwards to reach its present status of an official joint project of 8 States of the region. The core of the SEEIIST Project is a state-of-the-art ‘Facility for Tumour Therapy and Biomedical Research with Protons and Heavier Ions’. The Project has just entered the Design Study Phase. From 2018 to 2021 Damjanović was the Chairperson of the Intergovernmental Steering Committee of the SEEIIST Project, she is now working as board member of the SEEIIST Association.
