= Vladislav Dajković =

Montenegrin politician

- Владислав Дајковић
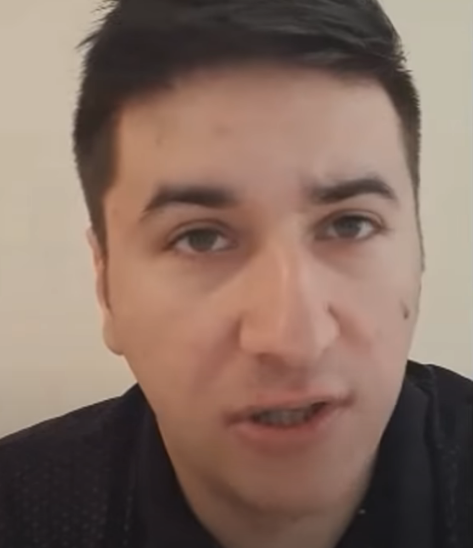

Member of the City Assembly of Podgorica
- In office 12 April 2023 – 13 January 2026

Personal details
- Born: 13 January 1992 (age 34) Cetinje, SFR Yugoslavia (now Montenegro)
- Party: Free Montenegro (2021–present)
- Other political affiliations: ZBCG (in 2020); PCG (2018–2019); DEMOS (2015–2018)
- Education: University of Belgrade; ITES de Monterrey
- Occupation: Political activist, politician
- Website: dajkovic.me

Vladislav Dajković (Serbian Cyrillic: Владислав Дајковић; born 13 January 1992) is a Montenegrin Serb politician serving as a member of the City Assembly of Podgorica from 12 April 2023 to 13 January 2026. He was one of the founders and former secretary general of the True Montenegro, a right-wing populist pro-Serbian political party in Montenegro, which he left in 2019, after which he founded another right-wing party, Free Montenegro (Slobodna Crna Gora).

== Biography ==
=== Early life and education ===
Dajković was born in 1992 in Cetinje, which at the time was a part of the Federal Republic of Yugoslavia. He finished high school in Podgorica and later graduated from the Faculty of Economics, University of Belgrade and the Monterrey Institute of Technology and Higher Education at their Mexico City campus. He also received his master's degree at the Faculty of Political Sciences, University of Belgrade. He practiced his English language skills in Washington D.C. He declares himself a Montenegrin but also a Serb. He said that for him a Montenegrin represents a Serb, and a Serb represents a Montenegrin.

=== Political career ===
In 2014, Dajković joined the "Movement for Neutrality" and served in the main board of the movement. He was also а member of the centre-right DEMOS.

In September 2015, he was beaten up outside of a bar in the center of Podgorica. He gave a statement to police where he said that the manager of the bar beat him up. After the incident, Dajković stated that the manager of the bar is closely related to then Prime Minister and the current President of Montenegro, Milo Đukanović. He also stated that he will not stop his political activism until Đukanović leaves office.

He also appeared in a TV talk show hosted by a Serbian-Canadian director Boris Malagurski. Dajković has established himself as a fierce critic of the ruling DPS of Milo Đukanović, as well as the accession of Montenegro to NATO.

In 2018, he was one of the founders and was named the general secretary of the True Montenegro, a right-wing populist political party in Montenegro which is led by Marko Milačić, also a former member of the "Movement for Neutrality".

In September 2019, Dajković and Milačić were arrested after Milačić climbed on the roof of the car and gave a speech he was supposed to give in front of the prosecutor's office. The Police Administration announced that he prevented the officers of the Communal Inspection from performing their official duties. In late 2019, Milačić removed Dajković from his position as the general secretary due to the "insurmountable loss of professional and personal trust".

He has participated in numerous protests against the government including the Montenegrin religious protests in 2019-2020. For the 2020 Montenegrin parliamentary elections, he endorsed the coalition For the Future of Montenegro, and its leader Zdravko Krivokapić. He also announced that he will be joining the campaign of the coalition.

He has received media attention for posting many anti-government humorous videos on his Facebook page which numbers more than 100,000 followers. He holds good relations with a Serbian nationalist politician, Miša Vacić and a Republika Srpska politician, Draško Stanivuković with whom he participated in an anti-government rally in Nikšić on 28 August 2020. In October 2020, Dajković went to Belgrade to pick up his master's diploma. His car also ended up keyed with the inscription "MNE" (abbreviation for Montenegro). He accused the people close to President Đukanović for this incident.

On 26 May 2021, Dajković announced that he is ready to run for mayor of Podgorica.

During the 2021 North Kosovo protests, Dajković visited the local Serbs protesting against the ban of Serbian license plates in Kosovo. Following his visit he received death threats.

In October 2021, Dajković founded Free Montenegro, a right-wing populist political party, announcing his candidacy for the mayor of Podgorica office, at the next Capital City local election in May 2022.

Dajković was elected member of the City Assembly of Podgorica as part of the Democratic Front coalition at the 2022 local elections and was sworn in on 12 April 2023. In August 2023, the mayor Olivera Injac appointed him the head of the Service for Citizens of Podgorica.

In August 2026, Dajković was given a tour of Christiansborg, the seat of the Folketing, by danish MF and leader of Danish People's Party Morten Messerschmidt. Following the visit Messerschmidt received backlash from other members of the Folketing.
