= Olivera Injac =

Mayor of Podgorica since 2023

- Оливера Ињац
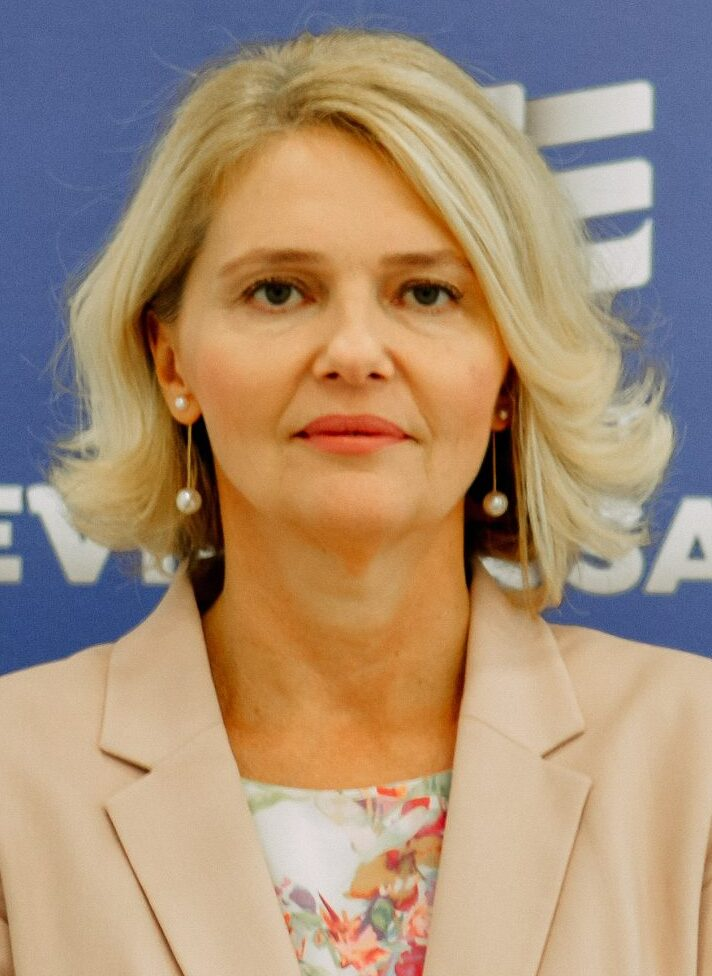
- Injac in 2023

Mayor of Podgorica
- In office 13 April 2023 – 28 December 2024
- Preceded by: Ivan Vuković
- Succeeded by: Saša Mujović

Minister of Defence
- In office 4 December 2020 – 28 April 2022
- Prime Minister: Zdravko Krivokapić
- Preceded by: Predrag Bošković
- Succeeded by: Raško Konjević

Personal details
- Born: 1972 (age 53–54) Titograd, SR Montenegro, SFR Yugoslavia
- Party: Europe Now! (2022–present)
- Education: University of Montenegro
- Occupation: University professor; politician

Olivera Injac (Montenegrin Cyrillic: Оливера Ињац; born 1972) is a Montenegrin university professor of security and politician who served as the mayor of Podgorica from 13 April 2023 to 28 December 2024. She served as the minister of defence in the Government of Montenegro and the cabinet of Zdravko Krivokapić from 4 December 2020 to 28 April 2022.

== Early life and education ==
Injac was born in 1972 in Titograd, SR Montenegro, SFR Yugoslavia. Injac graduated from the Faculty of Philosophy in Nikšić in 1999, and completed her postgraduate studies in 2005 at the Faculty of Political Sciences in Podgorica. She defended her master's degree at the Podgorica Faculty of Political Sciences, and received her doctorate on the topic "Cultural aspect of international security", in January 2011.

== Career ==
She was employed in the Ministry of Internal Affairs of Montenegro from 2000 until 2007, as part of the Public Security Services and the Department of Analytics, as an independent advisor and analyst. At the University of Donja Gorica in Podgorica, she has been employed since 2008, as a professor of security. She is the only professor of security in Montenegro.

== Political career ==
On 27 November 2020, the Prime Minister–designate of Montenegro, Zdravko Krivokapić, appointed her a candidate for the Minister of Defence in the new Government cabinet of Montenegro. She served until 28 April 2022 when the new government was formed.

In August 2022, she joined the newly-founded Europe Now (PES) led by former ministers Milojko Spajić and Jakov Milatović and became its vice president. She received the second position on PES's electoral list for the 2022 local elections in Podgorica and was elected to the City Assembly. On 7 April 2023, PES presidency nominated Injac for the next mayor of Podgorica. She was sworn in as mayor on 13 April 2023, succeeding Ivan Vuković. She is the first female mayor of Podgorica. She was succeeded as mayor by Saša Mujović on 28 December 2024.
