= Mayor of Podgorica =

Head of the City of Podgorica

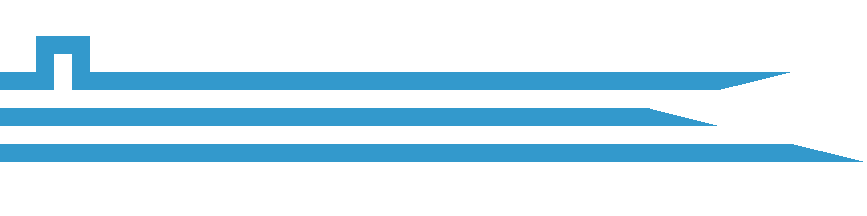
Flag of the mayor of Podgorica

The Mayor of Podgorica (Montenegrin: Gradonačelnik Podgorice / Градоначелник Подгорице) is the head of the City of Podgorica (capital of Montenegro). He acts on behalf of the City, and performs an executive function in the Podgorica Capital City. The current mayor since 29 December 2024 is Saša Mujović, member of the centrist Europe Now! movement, elected in the 2024 City Assembly election aftermath.

== List ==
Mayor	Term start	Term end	Party	Notes
Marko Miljanov	1878	1879	none	First governor of Podgorica after the 1878 liberation.
Ilija Plamenac	1879	1886	none	
Luka Nenezić	1886	1891	none	
Marko Pejanović	1891	1893	none	
Stevan Lukačević	1893	1895	none	
Stevan Raičković	1895	1899	none	
Jovan Mrčarica	1899	1906	none	
Spasoje Piletić	1906	1908	NS	
Nešo Stanić	1908^{[a]}		NS	
Stanko Marković	1908	1915	PNS	
Savo Šestić	1915	1916	none	
Ljubomir Glomazić	1916	1918	NS	
Savo Cerović	1918	1920	NRS	Podgorica integrated into the Yugoslav state in 1919.
Luka Pišteljić	1920	1922	none	
Ljubomir Krunić	1922	1925	NRS	
Nešo Šćepović	1925	1940	NRS	
Dimitrije Begović	1940	1941	NRS	Fled after the 1941 Axis invasion of Yugoslavia.
Miloš Vučinić	1941	1944	none	
Petar Raičković	1944	1945	NOF	First mayor of Podgorica after the 1944 liberation.
Stevan Radusinović	1945	1947	KPJ	Podgorica becomes the capital of SR Montenegro.
Periša Vujošević	1947	1949	KPJ	
Iko Mirković	1949	1950	KPJ	
Periša Vujošević	1950	1953	SKJ	KPJ reformed and renamed SKJ in 1952.
Iko Mirković	1954	1958	SKJ	
Branko Nilević	1958	1961	SKJ	
Between 1961 and 1965 the town was managed by Vaso Stajkić, Velizar Škerović and Vuko Radovanović.				
Aleksandar Radević	1965	1967	SKJ	
Branko Lazović	1967	1974	SKJ	
Miro Popović	1974	1978	SKJ	
Slobodan Filipović	1978	1982	SKJ	
Slobodan Simović	1982	1984	SKJ	
Borislav Drakić	1984	1986	SKJ	
Ratko Ivanović	1986	1989	SKJ	
Jovan Kavarić	1989	1990	SKJ	
Srđa Božović	1990	1993	DPS	Montenegrin SK reformed and renamed DPS.
Zoran Knežević	1993	1996	DPS	
Radivoje Rašović	1996	1998	SNP	SNP formed after splitting from DPS in 1997.
Dragiša Pešić	1998		SNP	
Mihailo Burić	1998	2000	DPS	
Miomir Mugoša	2000	2014	DPS	Capital of Independent Montenegro, since 2006.
Migo Stijepović	2014	2018	DPS	
Ivan Vuković	2018	2023	DPS	
Olivera Injac	2023	2024	PES!	First woman to assume the office of Mayor in Podgorica.
Saša Mujović	2024	present	PES!	
