= Ivan Vuković (politician) =

Mayor of Podgorica

Ivan Vuković Иван Вуковић
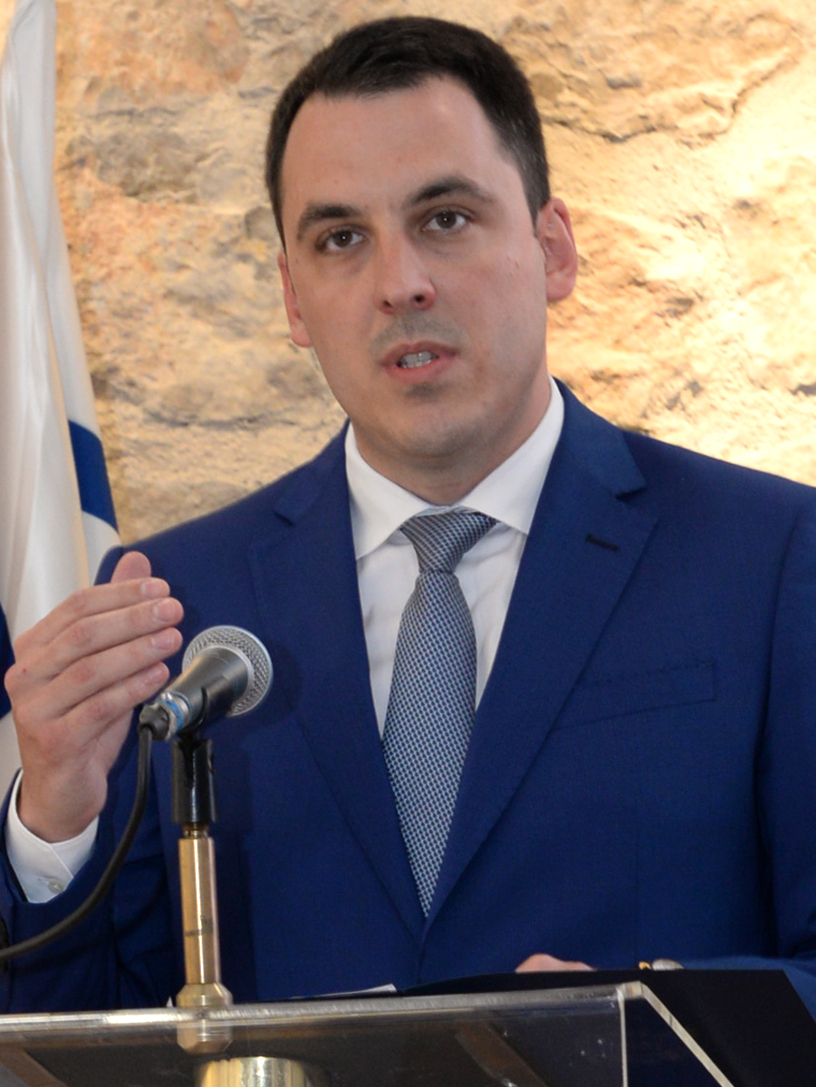
- Ivan Vuković in July 2019

43rd Mayor of Podgorica
- In office 20 July 2018 – 12 April 2023
- Preceded by: Migo Stijepović
- Succeeded by: Olivera Injac

Vice-President of the DPS
- Incumbent
- Assumed office 6 April 2023

Personal details
- Born: 17 September 1984 (age 42) Titograd, SR Montenegro, SFR Yugoslavia (now Podgorica, Montenegro)
- Party: Democratic Party of Socialists
- Education: University of Montenegro (M.A.); Central European University (Ph.D.)
- Occupation: Political scientist, politician

Ivan Vuković (Montenegrin Cyrillic: Иван Вуковић; born 17 September 1984) is a Montenegrin politician who served as the mayor of Podgorica from 2018 to 2023. Before taking office, he worked as an Assistant Professor and Vice-Dean for International Cooperation at the Faculty of Political Science in Podgorica.

== Early life ==
Vuković was born on September 17, 1984, in Podgorica, where he finished both elementary school and high school.

Vuković completed his undergraduate and specialist studies in 2007 at the University of Montenegro, Faculty of Political Science (study program International Relations and Diplomacy). He was one of the top students in his class, with an average grade of A (9.7).

Shortly before the referendum in 2006, he was one of the student representatives in the Movement for Independence of Montenegro.

After completing his specialist studies (2006-2007), Vuković completed an internship at the Montenegro Ministry of Foreign Affairs, after which he enrolled in postgraduate studies in the Netherlands at Leiden University.

In 2008, Vuković defended his masters thesis on the topic of "European Integration and Political Competition in Montenegro: The Determinants of Party Consensus".

Upon returning to Montenegro (2008-2014) Vuković began working as a teaching assistant at the Faculty of Political Science of the University of Montenegro.

During 2010, Vuković wrote foreign policy columns for the daily newspaper Pobjeda.

From September to November 2013, Vuković conducted a PhD thesis research at Harvard University and in June 2014 defended his PhD thesis on Party Outcomes in Hybrid Regimes in the Western Balkans and Beyond at the Central European University in Budapest.

== Academic career ==
In the period 2014–2015, Vuković acquired the title of Lecturer at the Faculty of Political Science; In November 2015 he was elected Assistant Professor and Vice-Dean for International Relations at the same Faculty.

Vuković spent academic year 2016–2017 at George Washington University as the first Fulbright Postdoctoral scholarship holder from Montenegro. During his stay in America, he taught there on the subject “Politics in Central and Eastern Europe”.

Vuković is fluent in English and has a good grasp of French.

== Political career ==
In 2018, Vuković publicly supported the presidential candidate of the Democratic Party of Socialists (DPS), Milo Đukanović.

In May 2018, he continued his political path as the holder of the coalition list “For the Good of the Citizens of Podgorica”, winning local election in Podgorica.

In July 2018, by secret ballot in the Capital City Assembly, Vuković was elected Mayor. Out of the total number of councilors (36), 35 voted for Vuković and one ballot was invalid.

On July 31, 2018, at age 34, Vuković began serving as the forty-third mayor of Podgorica. Vuković stated:

Today, I come to you as a free man, proud and humble, ready to put absolutely everything I have learned in my life for the purpose of the future development of our City, convinced that there are no shortcuts to success and that what each of us wishes upon our City of Podgorica can only come as a result of a hard work. That is why I urge you, sincerely and humanly, to help me and those with whom I am to share the heavy burden of responsibility that I take on today. And as for me, may the God judge my work and devotion.

— Ivan Vuković

== Bibliography ==
=== Publications ===
- "Deinstitutionalising Power of Decision-Making Personalisation: the Paradigmatic Case of the Serbian Communist-Successor Party" (with Filip Milačić), chapter accepted for publishing in the book: "Institutionalisation of Political Parties: Comparative Cases", Rowman & Littlefield International/ECPR Press, London, 2018.
- "The Rise of the Politics of National Identity: New Evidence from Western Europe" (with Filip Milačić), article accepted for publishing in the magazine Ethnopolitics, 2017.
- “Minority Representation in Montenegro: Defying Balkan Standards” (with Filip Milačić), chapter in the book: “Beyond International Conditionality: Local Variations in Minority Representation in Central and South-Eastern Europe”, NOMOS Baden-Baden, Germany, 2017.
- “Party Organization in Montenegro”, chapter in the book: “Organizational Structures of Political Parties in Central and Eastern European Countries”, Jagiellonian University Press, Poland, 2016.
- “Die Verfassung Montenegros” (with Filip Milačić), Osteuropa-RECHT, Vol. 62, No. 3, 2016.
- “The Determinants of Party Consensus on European Integration in Montenegro“, Politička misao (Croatian Political Science Review), Vol. 52, No. 4-5, 2015.
- “Population Censuses in Montenegro: A Century of National Identity ‘Repacking’”, Contemporary Southeastern Europe, Vol. 2, No. 2, 2015.
- “Political Dynamics of the Post-communist Montenegro: One-party Show“, Democratization, Vol. 22, No. 1, 2015.
- “Diverging Party Outcomes in Hybrid Regimes: The Cases of Croatia, Serbia, and Montenegro“, Romanian Journal of Political Science, Vol. 11, No. 2, 2011.
- “The Post-Communist Political Transition of Montenegro: Democratization Prior to Europeanization“, Contemporary European Studies, Vol. 2, No. 1, 2010.
- “Temeljne vrijednosti pravnog poretka Evropske unije“, Crna Gora u XXI stoljeću – U eri kompetitivnosti (“The Core Values of the EU Legal System“, Montenegro in the 21st Century – In the Era of Competitiveness), Montenegrin Academy of Sciences and Arts, Vol. 73, No. 1, 2010.
- “Rebuilding Leviathan: Political Competition and State Exploitation in Post-Communist Democracies”, by Anna Grzymala-Busse, Cambridge: Cambridge University Press. Book review published in Studies of Transition States and Societies, Vol. 2, No. 2, November 2010.

=== Research ===
- 2016-2017: Country expert (Montenegro), “Nations in Transit Report”, Freedom House
- 2015-: Associate in the project, “Democracy, Political Participation and The Role of Political Parties in South-East Europe”, Friedrich-Ebert-Stiftung
- 2014-: Associate in the project, “Censuses in South-East Europe”, a consortium of universities from the Western Balkans
- 2013-: Project coordinator, “Identity Politics and Democratization in Austria and Montenegro”, University of Graz and University of Montenegro
- 2013: Country expert (Montenegro), “Varieties of Democracy – V-Dem”, University Goteborg and Notre Dame University
- 2013-2016: Associate in the project, “Developing Human Rights Education at the Heart of Higher Education”, EU Tempus project
- 2013-2016: Associate in the project, “Development of Policy-Oriented Training Programmes in the Context of European Integration”, EU Tempus project
- 2010-: Member, Centar za društvena istraživanja, Fakultet političkih nauka, Univerzitet Crne Gore (Center for social research, Faculty of Political Sciences, University of Montenegro)
- 2009: Associate in the project, “Crna Gora u XXI vijeku – U eri kompetitivnosti” (Montenegro in XXI century – era of competition), Crnogorska akademija nauka i umjetnosti (Montenegrin Academy of Sciences and Arts)
