= Europe Now! =

Europe Now! Movement Pokret Evropa sad! Покрет Европа сад!
- Abbreviation: PES!
- President: Milojko Spajić
- Vice president: Olivera Injac
- Founders: Milojko Spajić; Jakov Milatović
- Founded: 26 June 2022; 4 years ago
- Headquarters: Crnogorskog bataljona bb, Podgorica
- Youth wing: The Youth of Europe
- Ideology: Populism; Economic liberalism Pro-Europeanism
- Political position: Centre to centre-right
- European affiliation: European People's Party (associate)
- International affiliation: Centrist Democrat International
- Colors: Gold; Blue; White
- Parliament: 19 / 81
- Local Parliaments: 56 / 844
- Mayors: 2 / 25

Website
- evropasad.com

The Europe Now! Movement (Montenegrin and Serbian: Pokret Evropa sad! / Покрет Европа сад!, PES!), is a centrist, pro-European, and economically liberal political party in Montenegro. Founded in June 2022 by former ministers Milojko Spajić and Jakov Milatović, the party advocates free-market economic reforms, European integration, and anti-corruption policies.

== History ==
The movement was founded on 26 June 2022 by Milojko Spajić and Jakov Milatović, who had previously served as independent Minister of Finance and Economy, respectively, in the technocratic cabinet formed after the 2020 parliamentary election. The two had announced plans to establish a political movement in February 2022, shortly after the cabinet of Zdravko Krivokapić lost a vote of confidence in Parliament.

Other founding members included former Defense Minister Olivera Injac and university professor Filip Ivanović. The movement was named after the “Europe Now” economic reform programme introduced in January 2022, which increased the minimum wage from €222 to €450 through reductions in healthcare contributions and tax reforms.

The party announced its intention to cooperate with centrist, civic, and minority interest parties, such as the Democrats-led and the URA-led coalitions, while criticising the Democratic Party of Socialists of Montenegro (DPS), Democratic Front (DF), and Socialist People’s Party (SNP), accusing them of corruption and contributing to ethnic polarisation in Montenegro. Lawyers Andrej Milović and Vasilije Čarapić joined the movement in September 2022 and became members of its presidency.

The movement first contested the 2022 local elections, achieving notable results, particularly in Podgorica election, where it contributed to the defeat of the DPS administration that had governed the capital since the 1990s. Jakov Milatović headed the party’s electoral list in Podgorica and participated in the formation of a new governing coalition in the city assembly.

The confirmation of the election results was delayed until March 2023 due to vacancies in the Constitutional Court of Montenegro and complaints submitted by several minor nationalist organisations alleging electoral irregularities. In addition to its results in Podgorica, the movement won the mayoral offices in Danilovgrad and Žabljak and joined governing coalitions in seven of the eleven municipalities in which it participated. Subsequent opinion polls indicated increased public support for the movement.

In January 2023, Milojko Spajić announced his candidacy for the 2023 presidential election. He was subsequently disqualified by the State Election Commission over allegations that he held Serbian citizenship in addition to Montenegrin citizenship, which would have made him constitutionally ineligible to run for president. Following his disqualification, the movement nominated Jakov Milatović as its presidential candidate. In the first round of the presidential election, Milatović won 29% of the vote, advancing to the runoff against incumbent president Milo Đukanović. In the second round, held on 2 April 2023, Milatović defeated Đukanović with approximately 60% of the vote.

At the 2023 parliamentary election, the movement, led by Spajić, emerged as the largest political party in Montenegro, winning 24 seats in the Parliament of Montenegro.

In February 2024, Jakov Milatović left the party following internal disagreements.

In November 2025, PES! joined the Centrist Democrat International. In 2026, the party became an associate member of the European People's Party.

== Election results ==
=== Presidential elections ===
Election	Candidate	1st round		2nd round		Result
Election	Candidate	Votes	%	Votes	%	Result
2023	Jakov Milatović	97,858	28.92%	221,592	58.88%	Won

=== Parliamentary elections ===
Election	Party leader	Performance				Alliance	Rank	Government
Election	Party leader	Votes	%	Seats	+/–	Alliance	Rank	Government
2023	Milojko Spajić	77,203	25.53%	22 / 81	New	PES–UCG–Civis	1st	Government

== Positions held ==
President of Montenegro	Years
Jakov Milatović	2023–present
Prime Minister of Montenegro	Years
Milojko Spajić	2023–present
Mayor of Podgorica	Years
Olivera Injac	2023–2024
Saša Mujović	2024–present
