= True Montenegro =

Montenegrin political party

True Montenegro Права Црна Гора Prava Crna Gora
- Leader: Marko Milačić
- Founders: Marko Milačić; Vladislav Dajković
- Founded: 29 January 2018
- Dissolved: 18 December 2025
- Merged into: New Serb Democracy
- Headquarters: Podgorica, Montenegro
- Ideology: Right-wing populism; Conservatism
- Political position: Right-wing
- Religion: Serbian Orthodox Church
- National affiliation: For the Future of Montenegro (2020–2021)
- Colours: Dark red and light blue
- Slogan: "Let us be what we were"
- Parliament: 0 / 81
- Mayors: 0 / 25
- Local Parliaments: 0 / 844

Website
- pravacrnagora.me

The True Montenegro (Serbian: Права Црна Гора / Prava Crna Gora; abbr. Права / Prava or ПЦГ / PCG) was a right-wing populist political party in Montenegro, formed in January 2018 from the political movement Resistance to Hopelessness (OB), prior to the March 2018 presidential election. It was founded by Marko Milačić, former journalist and political activist.

== History ==
After a series of unsuccessful attempts by the entire opposition to nominate a common candidate for 2018 presidential election executive board of newly formed True Montenegro has decided to support the previously-announced candidacy of the party leader Marko Milačić for President of Montenegro. After handing over more than 8,000 signatures of support to Montenegrin State Electoral Commission on 8 March, Milačić started his presidential campaign under the slogan "Bravely, (there has been) enough waiting".

Milačić came fourth in the election, winning 2.8% of the votes. In July 2020, the party joined the right-wing Democratic Front alliance for the 2020 Montenegrin parliamentary election, receiving one representative in the parliament, which elected from the common opposition For the Future of Montenegro list.

In November 2020, the party single MP Marko Milačić left the Democratic Front parliamentary group, continuing to support the formation of the new government. On 8 December 2020, President of the Political Council of the True Montenegro Željko Savović was named Advisor for the Internal Affairs to the Prime Minister of Montenegro Zdravko Krivokapić.

On December 18, 2025, the party was dissolved as all of its members, including Milačić, had joined the New Serb Democracy.

== Ideology ==
The public appearance of the True Montenegro party is based on social conservativism, traditionalism, Serbian–Montenegrin unionism and frequent right-wing populist and nationalist rhetoric. The party views the Serb community, which it represents, as discriminated against. It sees Montenegro as pursuing the concept of a nation-state and the politics of assimilation. The main goals of the party is to overthrow the ruling Democratic Party of Socialists of Milo Đukanović, which has been in power since the introduction of multi-party system, withdrawal Montenegro from NATO, proclamation of military neutrality and withdrawal of Montenegro soldiers from all military missions abroad.

Party leader Milačić maintains cooperation with certain regional public personalities, such as Croatian MP Ivan Pernar, Bosnian conceptual artist and activist Damir Nikšić and Serbian Canadian filmmaker Boris Malagurski.

== Electoral performance ==
=== Parliamentary elections ===
Election	Party leader	Performance				Alliance	Government
Election	Party leader	Votes	%	Seats	+/–	Alliance	Government
2020	Marko Milačić	133,261	32.55%	1 / 81	New	with ZBCG	Support 2020–22
2020	Marko Milačić	133,261	32.55%	1 / 81	New	with ZBCG	Opposition 2022–23
2023	Marko Milačić	3,630	1.20%	0 / 81	▼1	NK	Extra-parliamentary

=== Presidential elections ===
President of Montenegro
Election year	Candidate	#	1st round votes	% of vote	#	2nd round votes	% of vote
2018	Marko Milačić	4th	9,405	2.81%	—N/a	—	—
