= 2018 Montenegrin municipal elections =

Local elections in Montenegro

2018 Montenegrin local elections
- 4 February (Berane and Ulcinj); 20-27 May (11 municipalities)
- 458 seats in local parliaments
Party	Leader	Vote %	Seats	+/–
DPS	Milo Đukanović	42.79	196	+11
DCG	Aleksa Bečić	11.35	52	New
DF	Andrija Mandić	10.04	46	−37
SD	Ivan Brajović	8.73	40	New
SNP	Vladimir Joković	8.51	39	−46
BS	Rafet Husović	6.33	29	+1
SDP	Ranko Krivokapić	2.83	13	−28
AO	Nazif Cungu	2.62	12	+1
URA	Dritan Abazović	2.40	11	New
AK	Gëzim Hajdinaga	1.74	7	0
BB	Radomir Novaković	1.09	5	New
This lists parties that won seats. See the complete results below.
Mayoral seats before	Mayoral seats after
DPS (7); SNP (2); BS (2); FORCA (1); SDP (1)	DPS (9); SNP (2); BS (1); SD (1)

Local elections were held in Montenegro on 4 February 2018 for the municipalities of Berane and Ulcinj, and on 20 and 27 May in 11 municipalities, including the capital city Podgorica.

== Results ==
=== February elections (Berane and Ulcinj) ===
==== Berane ====
Summary of the 4 February 2018 Berane local election results
Parties and coalitions	Popular vote			Seats	
Parties and coalitions	Votes	%	±pp	Total	+/−
Berane Wins (DPS-SD-BS)^{1}	7,871	45.7	+0.2	17	±0
Healthy Berane (DF-SNP-UCG)^{2}	6,473	37.6	-8.8	14	-4
Democrats	1,822	10.6	new	4	+4
SDP-Demos^{3}	291	1.7	-1.2	-	±0
Civic list "Word"	270	1.6	new	-	±0
United Reform Action (URA)	251	1.5	new	-	±0
Civic list "Voice of the People for Berane"	153	0.9	new	-	±0
Justice and Reconciliation Party (SPP)	55	0.3	new	-	±0
Civic list "Progressive Berane"	25	0.1	new	-	±0
Other parties (2014)			-5.2	-	±0
Total	17211			35	±0
Valid votes	17,211	98.6			
Invalid votes	244	1.4			
Votes cast / turnout	17,455	73.7			
Abstentions	6,226	26.3			
Registered voters	23,681				
Source
Footnotes: ^{1}Berane wins coalition results are compared with the combined 2014 results of the DPS and BS lists.; ^{2}Healthy Berane coalition results are compared with the 2014 result of the DF-SNP coalition.; ^{3}SDP-Demos coalition results are compared with the 2014 result of the SDP list.

==== Ulcinj ====
Summary of the 4 February 2018 Ulcinj local election results
Parties and coalitions	Popular vote			Seats	
Parties and coalitions	Votes	%	±pp	Total	+/−
Democratic Party of Socialists (DPS)	2,918	23.7	-2.5	8	-1
New Democratic Power – FORCA	2,859	23.2	-0.9	8	+0
Wake up, Ulcinj! (DP/PD, Perspektiva, DS/LDMZ)^{1}	2,383	19.3	-	7	±0
Democratic Union of Albanians (DUA/UDSH)	1,159	9.4	+0.6	3	±0
Social Democrats (SD)	1,001	8.1	New	3	+3
United Reform Action (URA)	686	5.6	New	2	+2
Social Democratic Party (SDP)	363	2.9	–3.8	1	–1
Democrats	346	2.8	New	-	±0
Bosniak Party (BS)	339	2.8	+0.6	1	±1
Socialist People's Party and Democratic Front ^{2}	269	2.2	–5.0	-	–2
other parties (2014)			–5.6	-	–2
Total	12323			33	±0
Valid votes	12,323	98.8			
Invalid votes	147	1.2			
Votes cast / turnout	12,470	62.8			
Abstentions	7,399	37.2			
Registered voters	19,869				
Sources
Footnotes: ^{1} Totals for Wake up, Ulcinj! are compared to DS in the 2014 election.; ^{2} SNP-DF – For Healthy Ulcinj results are compared to the combined SNP and DF results in the 2014 election.

=== May elections (11 municipalities) ===
==== Plužine ====
Summary of the 20 May 2018 Plužine local election results
Parties and coalitions	Popular vote			Seats	
Parties and coalitions	Votes	%	±pp	Total	+/−
Socialist People's Party (SNP)	1,143	53.4	+0.6	16	-1
Democratic Party of Socialists (DPS)	337	15.7	-3.4	5	-1
Democratic Front (DF)	293	13.7	-4.2	4	-1
Democrats	270	12.6	New	4	+4
Social Democrats (SD)	98	4.6	New	1	+1
other parties (2014)			–10.2	-	–2
Total	2,141			30	±0
Valid votes	2,141	98.7			
Invalid votes	29	1.3			
Votes cast / turnout	2,170	85.3			
Abstentions	374	14.7			
Registered voters	2,544				

==== Bar ====
Summary of the 27 May 2018 Bar local election results
Parties and coalitions	Popular vote			Seats	
Parties and coalitions	Votes	%	±pp	Total	+/−
Democratic Party of Socialists (DPS)	7,218	34.6	+2.0	15	+1
Social Democrats (SD)	3,824	18.3	New	7	+7
Independent List "I Choose Bar" - Radomir Novaković-Cakan	2,580	12.4	New	5	+5
Democrats and United Reform Action (URA)	2,401	11.5	New	4	+4
Social Democratic Party (SDP)	1,432	6.9	-14.0	2	-5
Democratic Front (DF) and Socialist People's Party (SNP)	1,333	6.4	-23.5	2	-11
Bosniak Party (BS)	814	3.9	-2.5	1	-1
True Montenegro (PCG)	662	3.2	New	1	+1
Democratic Alliance (DEMOS)	246	1.2	New	-	±0
Reform for Bar	194	0.9	New	-	±0
Democratic League (DS/LD) and Democratic Party (DP/PD)	163	0.8	New	-	±0
other parties (2014)			–10.3	-	–2
Total	20,867			37	-1
Valid votes	20,867	98.6			
Invalid votes	295	1.4			
Votes cast / turnout	21,162	55.3			
Abstentions	17,073	44.7			
Registered voters	38,235				

==== Bijelo Polje ====
Summary of the 27 May 2018 Bijelo Polje local election results
Parties and coalitions	Popular vote			Seats	
Parties and coalitions	Votes	%	±pp	Total	+/−
Democratic Party of Socialists (DPS) – Bosniak Party (BS) – Social Democrats (SD)	13811	59,9	+6,8	25	+4
Democrats and United Reform Action (URA)	2238	9,7	New	4	+4
Democratic Front (DF)	2220	9,6	-2,2	4	-1
Socialist People's Party (SNP)	1557	6,8	-9,7	2	-5
Social Democratic Party (SDP)	1525	6,6	-6,2	2	-3
United Montenegro (UCG)	940	4,1	New	1	+1
Serb Coalition	515	2,2	+0,7	-	±0
Justice and Reconciliation Party (SPP) and Montenegrin (CG)	254	1,1	New	-	±0
other parties (2014)			–4,2	-	±0
Total	23060			38	±0
Valid votes	23060	98,5			
Invalid votes	356	1,5			
Votes cast / turnout	23416	57,3			
Abstentions	17175	42,7			
Registered voters	40235				

==== Danilovgrad ====
Summary of the 27 May 2018 Danilovgrad local election results
Parties and coalitions	Popular vote			Seats	
Parties and coalitions	Votes	%	±pp	Total	+/−
Democratic Party of Socialists (DPS)	4422	52,3	+4,2	19	+2
Democrats and United Reform Action (URA)	1533	18,1	New	6	+6
Social Democrats (SD)	788	9,3	New	3	+3
Socialist People's Party (SNP) – Democratic People's Party (DNP) – Yugoslav Communist Party (JKP)	635	7,5	-6,3	2	-2
New Serb Democracy (NSD)	514	6,1	-19,5	2	-7
True Montenegro (PCG)	319	3,8	New	1	+1
Social Democratic Party (SDP)	238	2,8	-11,0	-	-3
other parties (2014)			–1,7	-	±0
Total	8449			33	±0
Valid votes	8449	98,5			
Invalid votes	129	1,5			
Votes cast / turnout	8578	67,3			
Abstentions	4174	32,7			
Registered voters	12752				

==== Kolašin ====
Summary of the 27 May 2018 Kolašin local election results
Parties and coalitions	Popular vote			Seats	
Parties and coalitions	Votes	%	±pp	Total	+/−
Democratic Party of Socialists (DPS)	1983	39,0	+6,7	13	+3
Democrats	916	18,0	New	6	+6
Democratic Front (DF) – Socialist People's Party (SNP)	798	15,7	-31,2	5	-11
Groups of voters "Šule and Mikan with Citizens for Kolašin"	490	9,6	New	3	+3
Social Democrats (SD)	435	8,6	New	2	+2
Social Democratic Party (SDP)	343	6,7	-2,1	2	-1
United Montenegro (UCG)	120	2,4	New	-	±0
other parties (2014)			–12,0	-	-3
Total	5085			31	-1
Valid votes	5085	98,5			
Invalid votes	75	1,5			
Votes cast / turnout	5160	79,2			
Abstentions	1358	20,8			
Registered voters	6518				

==== Plav ====
Summary of the 27 May 2018 Plav local election results
Parties and coalitions	Popular vote			Seats	
Parties and coalitions	Votes	%	±pp	Total	+/−
Social Democrats (SD)	1485	29,6	New	10	+10
Bosniak Party (BS)	1022	20,4	-2,6	7	-1
Democratic Party of Socialists (DPS)	962	19,2	-13,3	6	-5
Social Democratic Party (SDP)	528	10,5	-10,7	3	-4
Democratic Front (DF) and Socialist People's Party (SNP)	336	6,7	-11,0	2	-3
Albanian Alternative (AA)	247	4,9	New	1	+1
Group of Voters – I vote for Plav	230	4,6	New	1	+1
Democrats	175	3,5	New	1	+1
Justice and Reconciliation Party (SPP)	27	0,5	New	-	±0
other parties (2014)			-3,6	-	-1
Total	5012			31	-1
Valid votes					
Invalid votes					
Votes cast / turnout					
Abstentions					
Registered voters					

==== Pljevlja ====
Summary of the 27 May 2018 Pljevlja local election results
Parties and coalitions	Popular vote			Seats	
Parties and coalitions	Votes	%	±pp	Total	+/−
Democratic Party of Socialists (DPS) – Social Democrats (SD) – Bosniak Party (BS)	10138	53,7	+8,0	20	+3
Democrats	3743	19,8	New	7	+7
New Serb Democracy (NSD) – Socialist People's Party (SNP) – Movement for Changes (PzP)	2467	13,1	-34,7	4	-13
Democratic People's Party (DNP) – Movement for Pljevlja – True Montenegro	2207	11,7	New	4	+4
Social Democratic Party (SDP)	337	1,7	New	-	±0
other parties (2014)			-6,5	-	-1
Total	18892			35	±0
Valid votes	18892	98,9			
Invalid votes	216	1,1			
Votes cast / turnout	19108	76,1			
Abstentions	6929	23,9			
Registered voters	26037				

==== Podgorica ====
Summary of the 27 May 2018 Podgorica local election results
Parties and coalitions	Popular vote			Seats	
Parties and coalitions	Votes	%	±pp	Total	+/−
DPS Coalition (DPS – BS – DUA – LP – CRN – PCG)	48047	47,7	+0,7	32	+3
Democrats and United Reform Action (URA)	26032	25,8	New	17	+17
Democratic Front (DF) and Socialist People's Party (SNP)	12291	12,2	-30,3	8	-17
Social Democrats (SD)	5122	5,1	New	3	+3
Social Democratic Party (SDP) and Demos	2985	2,9	-5,9	-	-8
True Montenegro (PCG)	2399	2,4	New	-	±0
Albanian Alternative (АА)	1492	1,5	New	1	+1
United Montenegro (UCG)	1409	1,4	New	-	±0
Citizen Group – Saša Mijović	746	0,7	New	-	±0
Serb Coalition	199	0,2	New	-	±0
other parties (2014)			-1,4	-	±0
Total	100722			61	±0
Valid votes	100722	98,5			
Invalid votes	1491	1,5			
Votes cast / turnout	102213	64,4			
Abstentions	56434	35,6			
Registered voters	158647				

===== Golubovci, Podgorica =====
Summary of the 27 May 2018 Golubovci local election results
Parties and coalitions	Popular vote			Seats	
Parties and coalitions	Votes	%	±pp	Total	+/−
Democratic Party of Socialists (DPS)	4169	47,9		16	
Democrats	2071	23,8		8	
Democratic Front (DF) and Socialist People's Party (SNP)	1748	20,1		7	
Social Democrats (SD)	455	5,2		1	
Social Democratic Party (SDP) – Demos – Free Citizens	165	1,8		-	
United Montenegro (UCG)	93	1,1		-	
other parties (2014)				-	
Total	8701			32	
Valid votes	8701	98,6			
Invalid votes	122	1,4			
Votes cast / turnout	8823	73,8			
Abstentions	3125	26,2			
Registered voters	11948				

==== Rožaje ====
Summary of the 27 May 2018 Rožaje local election results
Parties and coalitions	Popular vote			Seats	
Parties and coalitions	Votes	%	±pp	Total	+/−
Bosniak Party (BS)	6825	50,9	+3,5	19	+2
Democratic Party of Socialists (DPS)	3724	27,8	-6,8	10	-2
Social Democrats (SD)	1559	11,6	New	4	+4
Social Democratic Party (SDP)	610	4,6	-9,2	1	-3
Justice and Reconciliation Party (SPP)	378	2,8	-0,7	-	-1
Democrats	106	0,8	New	-	±0
United Reform Action (URA)	100	0,7	New	-	±0
Compliant to Rožaje - fraternal and frank forward	70	0,5	New	-	±0
Changes for a Better Rožaje - Aida Nina Kurpejović	30	0,2	New	-	±0
other parties (2014)			-0,7	-	±0
Total	13402			34	±0
Valid votes					
Invalid votes					
Votes cast / turnout					
Abstentions					
Registered voters					

==== Šavnik ====
Summary of the 27 May 2018 Šavnik local election results
Parties and coalitions	Popular vote			Seats	
Parties and coalitions	Votes	%	±pp	Total	+/−
Democratic Party of Socialists (DPS) and Social Democrats (SD)	862	61,8	+7,6	19	+2
Socialist People's Party (SNP) and Democratic Front (DF)	381	27,3	-18,5	8	-5
Democrats	152	10,9	New	3	+3
other parties (2014)			±0	-	±0
Total	1395			30	±0
Valid votes	1395	98,8			
Invalid votes	17	1,2			
Votes cast / turnout	1412	82,0			
Abstentions	311	18,0			
Registered voters	1723				

==== Žabljak ====
Summary of the 27 May 2018 Žabljak local election results
Parties and coalitions	Popular vote			Seats	
Parties and coalitions	Votes	%	±pp	Total	+/−
Democratic Party of Socialists (DPS) and Social Democrats (SD)	1303	55,8	+6,8	18	+1
Democratic Front (DF) and Socialist People's Party (SNP)	525	22,5	-18,6	7	-6
Democrats	506	21,7	New	6	+6
other parties (2014)			-9,9	-	-1
Total	2334			31	±0
Valid votes	2234	98,1			
Invalid votes	46	1,9			
Votes cast / turnout	2380	76,7			
Abstentions	721	23,3			
Registered voters	3101				
