= Albanian Coalition =

Minority coalitions in Montenegro

The Albanian Coalition (Albanian: Koalicioni Shqiptar; Montenegrin: Albanska koalicija, Албанска коалиција) is the name of several Albanian minority pre-election coalitions in Montenegro. Originally established by Democratic Party president and former Mayor of Ulcinj, Fatmir Gjeka, it currently consists of the Democratic Party, the Democratic League in Montenegro and the Democratic Union of Albanians. The coalition currently has one representative in Parliament of Montenegro.

== History ==
=== DP–DSCG–AA coalition (2012) ===
The alliance was formed in Ulcinj by the Democratic Party (DP), Democratic League in Montenegro (DSCG) and the Albanian Alternative (AA), prior to the 2012 elections. The DS and AA had contested the 2009 elections as the "Albanian List", winning a single seat. The coalition won one seat at the 2012 election, which was allocated to a member of DP. Led by Fatmir Deka, in the 2012 elections the alliance received 1.1% of the vote, winning one seat.

=== DP–DSCG–AKP coalition (2016) ===
In September 2016, the AA decided to left coalition with DP and DSCG, by agreeing to form a pre-election alliance with New Democratic Force (FORCA) and Democratic Union of Albanians (DUA). Prior the 2016 elections, Gjeka's DP and DSCG decided to sign an agreement with minor Albanian Coalition Perspective (AKP, former AA members), forming electoral list under the name "Albanian Coalition with One goal". 2016 electoral list ballot carrier was independent Gezim Hajdinaga. At the elections, the DP-DSCG coalition lost its parliamentary status, winning 0.63% of the popular vote.

=== DP–DSCG–DUA coalition (2020) ===
In July 2020 the Democratic Union of Albanians (DUA) decided to sign an agreement with DP and DSCG, with the three parties agreeing to form a pre-election alliance under the name "Albanian Coalition – Unanimously", with DP leader Fatmir Gjeka as head of the joint electoral list for the 2020 parliamentary elections. The Alliance received 1.14% of the vote, winning one seat.
