= 2023 Montenegrin municipal elections =

- 5 March
- 32 seats in local parliament
Party	Leader	Vote %	Seats	+/–
AF (Note: Coalition between AA, DSCG and DUA)	Nik Gjeloshaj	51.50	18	+2
DPS, SD and BS	Milo Đukanović	33.64	12	−4
DCG	Aleksa Bečić	5.06	1	0
SDP	Ivan Vujović	4.07	1	+1
This lists parties that won seats. See the complete results below.

Municipal elections were held on 5 March 2023 in Tuzi Municipality. These elections were called by President of Montenegro Jakov milativic for 5 March 2023, after Tuzi became an independent municipality on 1 September 2018.

== Results ==
=== Tuzi ===
Party	Votes	%	Seats	+/–
Albanian Forum (ASH–LDSH)	4,214	51.50	18	+2
DPS–SD–BS–UDSH	2,753	33.64	12	–4
Democratic Montenegro	414	5.06	1	0
Social Democratic Party of Montenegro	333	4.07	1	+1
Albanian Coalition (DP–Forca)	179	2.19	0	0
Socialist People's Party of Montenegro	159	1.94	0	0
Justice and Reconciliation Party	131	1.60	0	0
Total	8,183	100.00	32	0
Valid votes	8,183	99.14		
Invalid/blank votes	71	0.86		
Total votes	8,254	100.00		
Registered voters/turnout	12,387	66.63		
Source: DIK
