= Albanian List (Montenegro) =

Montenegrin electoral list (2020–2023)

Albanian List Lista Shqiptare Албанска листа
- Leader: Nik Gjeloshaj
- Founded: 20 July 2020
- Dissolved: March 2023
- Ideology: Albanian minority interests
- Colours: Red Black
- Slogan: "The time is now" (Koha është tani)

The Albanian List (Albanian: Lista Shqiptare, abbr. LSh; Montenegrin: Албанска листа, romanized: Albanska lista, abbr. AL) was an electoral list of political parties and smaller lists representing the Albanian minority in Montenegro. It consisted of the Albanian Alternative (AA), New Democratic Force (Forca), Albanian Democratic League (LDSH), Tuzi Union, and Civic Initiative "Perspective".

The list won one seat in the 2020 parliamentary election, with Genci Nimanbegu of Forca being elected to the national parliament. The coalition was dissolved in 2023, when Nimanbegu refused to step down from his seat, as agreed to previously, so that he could be replaced by a representative of the AA for that year's parliamentary election.

== History ==
The Albanian List was formed as an effort to unite the various political parties and electoral lists representing the Albanian minority in Montenegro ahead of the 2020 parliamentary election. It consisted of three political parties – Albanian Alternative (AA), New Democratic Force (Forca), and the Albanian Democratic League (LDSH) – and two electoral lists – the Tuzi Union and Civic Initiative "Perspective". The AA and Forca had previously contested the 2016 parliamentary elections jointly with the Democratic Union of Albanians (DUA) as the Albanians Decisively coalition, winning a single seat. The DUA joined the Albanian Coalition instead for the 2020 election. Nik Gjeloshaj, the mayor of Tuzi and leader of the AA, headed the Albanian List in the 2020 election. The list received 1.58% of the popular vote, winning one seat. Genci Nimanbegu of Forca was elected to the national parliament.

The list was not renewed for the 2023 parliamentary election due to Nimanbegu's refusal to give up his seat for a representative of the AA, as had previously been agreed upon. As part of the list's formation, it was agreed that Forca would receive the first seat granted by the proportional representation list in the 2020 election, and the AA would receive it in the 2023 election. However, Nimanbegu refused to concede his seat and insisted he had the mandate of Albanian voters in Montenegro. The list was consequently dissolved in March 2023, with the AA and LDSH forming a new electoral list named the Albanian Forum.

== Member parties and lists ==
Party name	Abbr.	Leader	Ref.
Albanian Alternative	ASH	Nik Gjeloshaj	
New Democratic Force	Forca	Nazif Cungu	
Albanian Democratic League	LDSH	Nikola Camaj	
Tuzi Union	UT	Fadil Kajoshaj	
Civic Initiative "Perspective"	Perspektiv	Amir Holaj	

== Election results ==
Parliamentary election results of the Albanian List
Election	Leader	Seats	Votes	Vote share	+/−	Outcome
2020	Nik Gjeloshaj	1 / 81	6,488	1.58%		Opposition
