= List of elections in 2023 =

The following elections were scheduled to occur in 2023. The National Democratic Institute also maintains a calendar of elections around the world.

- 2023 International Criminal Court judges election
- 2023 United Nations Security Council election
- 2023 national electoral calendar
- 2023 local electoral calendar

== Africa ==
- Benin
  - 2023 Beninese parliamentary election, 11 January
- Chad
  - 2023 Chadian constitutional referendum, 17 December
- Central African Republic
  - 2023 Central African constitutional referendum, 30 July
- Democratic Republic of Congo
  - 2023 Democratic Republic of the Congo general election, 20-24 December
- Djibouti
  - 2023 Djiboutian parliamentary election, 23 February
- Egypt
  - 2023 Egyptian presidential election, 10-12 December
- Guinea-Bissau
  - 2023 Guinea-Bissau legislative election, 4 June
- Gabon
  - 2023 Gabonese general election, 26 August
- Liberia
  - 2023 Liberian general election, 10 October (first round) & 14 November (second round)
- Mali
  - 2023 Malian constitutional referendum, 18 June
- Mauritania
  - 2023 Mauritanian local elections, 13 May
  - 2023 Mauritanian parliamentary election, 13 and 27 May
- Madagascar
  - 2023 Malagasy presidential election, 16 November
- Nigeria
  - 2023 Nigerian general election, 25 February
- Somalia
  - 2023 Puntland municipal elections, 25 May
- Sierra Leone
  - 2023 Sierra Leonean general election, 24 June
- Zimbabwe
  - 2023 Zimbabwean general election, 23 August

== Americas ==
- Argentina
  - 2023 Argentine provincial elections
  - 2023 Argentine general election, 22 October (first round) & 19 November (second round)
- Antigua and Barbuda
  - 2023 Antiguan and Barbudan general election, 18 January
- Colombia
  - 2023 Colombian regional and municipal election, 29 October
- Chile
  - 2023 Chilean Constitutional Council election, 7 May
  - 2023 Chilean constitutional referendum, 17 December
- Cuba
  - 2023 Cuban parliamentary election, 26 March
- Canada
  - 2023 Prince Edward Island general election, 3 April
  - 2023 Alberta general election, 29 May
  - 2023 Manitoba general election, 3 October
  - 2023 Northwest Territories general election, 14 November
- Ecuador
  - 2023 Ecuadorian local elections, 5 February
  - 2023 Ecuadorian general election, 20 August (first round) & 15 October (second round)
- Guyana
  - 2023 Guyanese local elections, 12 June
- Guatemala
  - 2023 Guatemalan general election, 25 June (first round) & 20 August (second round)
- Mexico
  - 2023 Mexican gubernatorial elections 4 June
- Paraguay
  - 2023 Paraguayan general election, 30 April
- Trinidad and Tobago
  - 2023 Trinidadian local elections, 14 August
- United States
  - 2023 United States gubernatorial elections
  - 2023 United States state legislative elections
- Venezuela
  - 2023 Venezuelan referendum, 3 December

== Asia ==
- Bangladesh
  - 2023 Bangladesh parliamentary by-elections, held in January, February, March, April, July, September and November
- Bhutan
  - 2023–24 Bhutanese National Assembly election, 30 November (first round)
- Cambodia
  - 2023 Cambodian general election, 23 July
- East Timor
  - 2023 East Timorese parliamentary election, 21 May
- India
  - 2023 elections in India
    - 2023 Tripura Legislative Assembly election, 16 February
    - 2023 Meghalaya Legislative Assembly election, 27 February
    - 2023 Nagaland Legislative Assembly election, 27 February
    - 2023 Karnataka Legislative Assembly election, 10 May
    - 2023 Mizoram Legislative Assembly election, 7 November
    - 2023 Chhattisgarh Legislative Assembly election, 7 November and 17 November
    - 2023 Madhya Pradesh Legislative Assembly election, 17 November
    - 2023 Rajasthan Legislative Assembly election, 25 November
    - 2023 Telangana Legislative Assembly election, 30 November
- Iraq
  - 2023 Iraqi governorate elections, 18 December
- Italy
  - 2023 Italian by-elections, 22 and 23 October
- Japan
  - 2023 Japanese unified local elections, 9 April
  - 2023 Japanese by-elections, 23 April and 22 October
- Kazakhstan
  - 2023 Kazakh legislative election, 19 March
- Thailand
  - 2023 Thai general election, 14 May
- Malaysia
  - 2023 Malaysian state elections, 12 August
- Maldives
  - 2023 Maldivian presidential election, 9 September (first round) & 30 September (second round)
- 2023 Emirati parliamentary election, 7 October
- North Korea
  - 2023 North Korean local elections, 26 November
- Oman
  - 2023 Omani general election, 29 October
- Qatar
  - 2023 Qatari general election, 23 June
- Singapore
  - 2023 Singaporean presidential election, 1 September
- Turkmenistan
  - 2023 Turkmen parliamentary election, 26 March
- United Arab Emirates
  - 2023 Emirati parliamentary election, 7 October
- Uzbekistan
  - 2023 Uzbek presidential election, 9 July

== Europe ==
- Albania
  - 2023 Albanian local elections, 14 May
- Andorra
  - 2023 Andorran parliamentary election, 2 April
  - 2023 Andorran local elections, 17 December
- Armenia
  - 2023 Yerevan City Council election, 17 September
- Austria
  - 2023 Lower Austrian state election, 29 January
  - 2023 Carinthian state election, 5 March
  - 2023 Salzburg state election, 23 April
- Bulgaria
  - 2023 Bulgarian parliamentary election, 2 April
  - 2023 Bulgarian local elections, 29 October
- Cyprus
  - 2023 Cypriot presidential election, 5 February (first round) & 12 February (second round)
- Czech Republic
  - 2023 Czech presidential election, 13-14 January (first round) & 27-28 January (second round)
- Estonia
  - 2023 Estonian parliamentary election, 5 March
- Finland
  - 2023 Finnish parliamentary election, 2 April
  - 2023 Ålandic legislative election, 15 October
- France
  - 2023 French Senate election, 24 September
- Germany
  - 2023 Berlin repeat state election, 12 February
  - 2023 Bremen state election, 14 May
  - 2023 Bavarian state election, 8 October
  - 2023 Hessian state election, 8 October
- Greece
  - May 2023 Greek legislative election, 21 May
  - June 2023 Greek legislative election, 25 June
  - 2023 Greek local elections, 8 October (first round) & 15 October (second round)
- Italy
  - 2023 Italian local elections, 2-3 April & 17-18 April (Friuli-Venezia Giulia) / 14-15 May (first round) / 21 May (first round in Aosta Valley and Trentino-Alto Adige) / 28-29 May (second round and first round in Sardinia and Sicily) / 11-12 June (second round in Sardinia and Sicily)
  - 2023 Italian regional elections
    - 2023 Lazio regional election, 12-13 February
    - 2023 Lombard regional election, 12-13 February
    - 2023 Friuli-Venezia Giulia regional election, 2-3 April
    - 2023 Molise regional election, 25-26 June
    - 2023 Trentino-Alto Adige/Südtirol provincial elections, 22 October
- Latvia
  - 2023 Latvian presidential election, 31 May
- Liechtenstein
  - 2023 Liechtenstein local elections, 5 March and 2 April
- Lithuania
  - 2023 Lithuanian municipal elections, 5 March
- Luxembourg
  - 2023 Luxembourg general election, 8 October
- Moldova
  - 2023 Gagauz gubernatorial election, 30 April (first round) & 14 May (second round)
  - 2023 Moldovan local elections, 5 November
- Montenegro
  - 2023 Montenegrin municipal elections, 5 March
  - 2023 Montenegrin presidential election, 19 March (first round) & 2 April (second round)
  - 2023 Montenegrin parliamentary election, 11 June
- Netherlands
  - 2023 Dutch island council elections, 15 March
  - 2023 Dutch provincial elections, 15 March
  - 2023 Dutch Senate election, 30 May
  - 2023 Dutch general election, 22 November
- Norway
  - 2023 Norwegian local elections, 11 September
- Poland
  - 2023 Polish parliamentary election, 15 October
- Portugal
  - 2023 Madeiran regional election, 24 September
- Russia
  - 2023 Russian regional elections, 10 September
- Serbia
  - 2023 Serbian parliamentary election, 17 December
  - 2023 Belgrade City Assembly election, 17 December
  - 2023 Serbian local elections, 17 December
  - 2023 Vojvodina provincial election, 17 December
- Slovakia
  - 2023 Slovak parliamentary election, 30 September
- Spain
  - 2023 Spanish local elections, 28 May
  - 2023 Spanish regional elections, 28 May
    - 2023 Aragonese regional election, 28 May
    - 2023 Asturian regional election, 28 May
    - 2023 Balearic regional election, 28 May
    - 2023 Canarian regional election, 28 May
    - 2023 Cantabrian regional election, 28 May
    - 2023 Castilian-Manchegan regional election, 28 May
    - 2023 Extremaduran regional election, 28 May
    - 2023 Madrilenian regional election, 28 May
    - 2023 Murcian regional election, 28 May
    - 2023 Navarrese regional election, 28 May
    - 2023 Riojan regional election, 28 May
    - 2023 Valencian regional election, 28 May
    - 2023 Ceuta Assembly election, 28 May
    - 2023 Melilla Assembly election, 28 May
  - 2023 Spanish general election, 23 July
- Switzerland
  - 2023 Zürich cantonal elections, 12 February
  - 2023 Swiss federal election, 22 October
- Turkey
  - 2023 Turkish presidential election, 14 May (first round) & 28 May (second round)
  - 2023 Turkish parliamentary election, 14 May
- United Kingdom
  - 2023 United Kingdom electoral calendar

== Oceania ==
- Australia
  - 2023 New South Wales state election, 25 March
- French Polynesia
  - 2023 French Polynesian legislative election, 16 April (first round) & 30 April (second round)
- New Zealand
  - 2023 New Zealand general election, 14 October
- Marshall Islands
  - 2023 Marshallese general election, 20 November
