= Elections in Montenegro =

Montenegro holds national election for the Parliament and the office of President. Montenegro has a multi-party system with numerous parties. The Parliament has 81 members elected by a system of proportional representation using D'Hondt method for a four-year term. To enter the national parliament, parties have to surpass the electoral threshold of 3%, except for minority lists, for which that threshold does not apply. President is elected at large, with a second round runoff between the two first placed candidates, if no candidate receives an absolute majority in the first round.

== Latest elections ==
=== 2023 Parliamentary election ===
Party	Votes	%	Seats	+/–
Europe Now!	77,203	25.53	24	+22
Together! (DPS–SD–LP–UDSh)	70,228	23.22	21	−12
For the Future of Montenegro (NSD–DNP–RP)	44,565	14.74	13	−2
Aleksa and Dritan – Count Bravely! (Democrats–URA)	37,730	12.48	11	−3
Bosniak Party	21,423	7.08	6	+3
SNP–DEMOS	9,472	3.13	2	−4
Social Democratic Party of Montenegro	9,010	2.98	0	−2
Justice for All	8,380	2.77	0	New
Albanian Forum (ASh–LDSh–UNSh)	5,767	1.91	2	+2
Turnaround for a Safe Montenegro	4,833	1.60	0	New
Albanian Alliance (FORCA–PD–LDMZ)	4,512	1.49	1	–1
People's Coalition (DHP–PCG–SCG–DSS–PZPV)	3,630	1.20	0	−1
Croatian Civic Initiative	2,226	0.74	1	+1
Movement for Changes	1,993	0.66	0	−5
Yes, We Can!	1,444	0.48	0	New
Total	302,416	100.00	81	0
Valid votes	302,416	99.05		
Invalid/blank votes	2,890	0.95		
Total votes	305,306	100.00		
Registered voters/turnout	542,468	56.28		
Source: RTC

=== 2023 Presidential elections ===
Candidate	Party	First Round		Second Round	
Candidate	Party	Votes	%	Votes	%
Jakov Milatović	Europe Now!	97,867	28.92	221,592	58.88
Milo Đukanović	Democratic Party of Socialists	119,685	35.37	154,769	41.12
Andrija Mandić	Democratic Front	65,394	19.32		
Aleksa Bečić	Democratic Montenegro	37,563	11.10		
Draginja Vuksanović	Social Democratic Party	10,669	3.15		
Goran Danilović	United Montenegro	4,659	1.38		
Jovan Radulović	Independent	2,574	0.76		
Invalid/blank votes		3,169	–	3,920	–
Total		338,411	100	376,361	100
Registered voters/turnout		542,154	63.00	542,154	70.14
Source: DIK

Vote share (First Round)
Đukanović	35.37%
Milatović	28.92%
Mandić	19.32%
Bečić	11.10%
Vuksanović	3.15%
Danilović	1.38%
Radulović	0.76%

Vote share (Second Round)
Milatović	58.88%
Đukanović	41.12%

== See also ==
- Electoral calendar
- Electoral system
- Elections in Yugoslavia
