= 2019 Montenegrin municipal elections =

2019 Montenegrin local elections
- 3 March
- 32 seats in local parliament
Party	Leader	Vote %	Seats	+/–
AF (Note: Coalition between AA, DSCG and DUA)	Nik Gjeloshaj	47.01	16	+4
DPS	Milo Đukanović	31.80	10	−4
BS	Rafet Husović	12.27	4	+1
SD	Ivan Brajović	4.60	1	0
DCG	Aleksa Bečić	3.23	1	−1
This lists parties that won seats. See the complete results below.
Mayoral seats before	Mayoral seats after
AA (1)	AA (1)

Municipal elections were held on 3 March 2019 in Tuzi Municipality. These elections were called by President of Montenegro Milo Đukanović for 3 March 2019, after Tuzi became an independent municipality on 1 September 2018.

== Participants ==
=== Albanian minority parties ===
On 21 December 2018, two political parties representing the Albanian minority in Montenegro, Albanian Alternative (ASH) and Democratic League of Albanians (LDSH) formed a pre-election alliance named Albanian Forum, under the leadership of Nik Gjeloshaj. Democratic Union of Albanians (UDSH) joined the Forum on 28 January 2019. The alliance ran in the elections as "Malësia unites us" (Albanian: Malësia na bashkon).

== Results ==
=== Tuzi ===
Party	Votes	%	+/–	Seats	+/–
Albanian Forum (ASH – LDSH – UDSH)	3,682	47.01	+13.01	16	+4
Democratic Party of Socialists of Montenegro	2,491	31.80	–9.33	10	–4
Bosniak Party	961	12.27	+1.60	4	+1
Social Democrats of Montenegro	360	4.60	+0.21	1	0
Democratic Montenegro	253	3.23	–2.59	1	–1
Socialist People's Party of Montenegro	86	1.10	–0.70	0	0
Total	7,833	100.00	–	32	0
Valid votes	7,833	98.95			
Invalid/blank votes	83	1.05			
Total votes	7,916	100.00			
Registered voters/turnout	11,904	66.50			
Source: Municipal Electoral Commission
