= For Unity =

For Unity was an Albanian political alliance in Montenegro.

== History ==
The alliance was formed by New Democratic Power – FORCA, the Albanian Coalition "Perspective", and the Citizens Initiative prior to the 2012 parliamentary elections. In the 2009 elections, New Democratic Power – FORCA and Albanian Coalition "Perspective" had each won one seat. Led by Genci Nimanbegu, it received 1.5% of the vote in the 2012 elections, winning a single seat.

In 2016, the New Democratic Power – FORCA agreed to form a pre-election alliance with Albanian Alternative (AA) and Democratic Union of Albanians (DUA).

Albanian Coalition "Perspective" decided to sign an agreement with Democratic League in Montenegro (DSCG) and Democratic Party (DP) for 2016 elections.
