= 2012 Montenegrin parliamentary election =

Parliamentary election held in Montenegro

- 14 October 2012
- Turnout: 70.56% (▲4.37pp)
Party	Leader	Vote %	Seats	+/–
ECG	Milo Đukanović	46.33	39	−7
DF	Miodrag Lekić	23.19	20	+7
SNP	Srđan Milić	11.24	9	−7
PCG	Darko Pajović	8.37	7	New
BS	Rafet Husović	4.24	3	+2
ZJ	Nazif Cungu	1.47	1	−1
KSH	Fatmir Gjeka	1.07	1	0
HGI	Marija Vučinović	0.41	1	0
This lists parties that won seats. See the complete results below.
Prime Minister before	Prime Minister after
Igor Lukšić; DPS	Milo Đukanović; DPS

Snap parliamentary elections were held in Montenegro on 14 October 2012. The parliamentary elections were the ninth since the reintroduction of multi-party system in 1990, and the third since regaining full independence in 2006. The result was a victory for the ruling European Montenegro alliance (based around the Democratic Party of Socialists) led by Milo Đukanović, which won 39 of the 81 seats, remaining without the majority by itself for the first time since the 2001 election, and subsequently forming a majority coalition government with the ethnic minority Bosniak Party (BS) and Croatian Civic Initiative (HGI) parties.

== Electoral system ==
The 81 members of Parliament were elected by proportional representation from a single nationwide constituency with an electoral threshold of 3%, although the threshold was reduced to 0.7% for ethnic minority parties in districts where ethnic minorities accounted for at least 15% of the population. For ethnic Croats, the electoral list wins one seat if it receives more than 0.35% of the popular vote. Seats were distributed using the D'Hondt method, which slightly favors larger lists.

== Electoral lists ==
Several coalitions were formed or continued for the election:

Coalition	Party	Main ideology	Leader
European Montenegro	DPS-SDP-LP	Social democracy	Milo Đukanović
Democratic Front	NOVA-PzP	Big tent, populism	Miodrag Lekić
Socialist People's Party		Social conservatism	Srđan Milić
Positive Montenegro		Social liberalism	Darko Pajović
Bosniak Party		Minority politics	Rafet Husović
Serb Unity	NS-SL-DCB	Conservatism	Jovan Markuš
For Unity	FORCA-AKP	Minority politics	Nazif Cungu
Albanian Coalition	DS-DP-AA	Minority politics	Fatmir Gjeka
Serb National Alliance	DSS-SSR	Conservatism	Ranko Kadić
Democratic Union of Albanians		Minority politics	Ferhat Dinosha
Croatian Civic Initiative		Minority politics	Marija Vučinović
Together	JKP-PUPI	Left-wing populism	Zoran Radošević

== Opinion polls ==
Poll results are listed in the table below in reverse chronological order, showing the most recent first, and using the date the survey's fieldwork was done, as opposed to the date of publication. If such date is unknown, the date of publication is given instead. The highest percentage figure in each polling survey is displayed in bold, and the background shaded in the leading party's colour. In the instance that there is a tie, then no figure is shaded. The lead column on the right shows the percentage-point difference between the two parties with the highest figures. When a specific poll does not show a data figure for a party, the party's cell corresponding to that poll is shown empty. The threshold for a party to elect members is 3%.

Date	Polling Firm/ Source	ECG	BS	SNP	DF		PCG	Others	Lead
Date	Polling Firm/ Source	ECG	BS	SNP	Nova	PzP	PCG	Others	Lead
Oct 2012	CeDem	47.2	2.3	14.9	18.5		10.2	6.9	28.7
Oct 2012	Ipsos	47	2.5	11	24		8	7.5	23
July 2012	DeFacto	50.7	2.9	18.2	9.4	7.1	8.3	3.4	32.5
Dec 2011	CeDem	54.4	ECG	17.2	9.1	6.8	—	15.5	37.2
Sep 2011	CeDem	54.1	ECG	17.9	8.2	7.7	—	12.2	28.2
Dec 2010	CeDem	56.4	ECG	19.7	6.1	6.9	—	10.7	28.2
Oct 2010	CeDem	56.9	ECG	17.8	9.2	4.7	—	11.3	30.3
July 2010	CeDem	53.2	ECG	18.6	8.1	4.9	—	15.2	30.3
**Oct 2009**	**Election**	51.9		**16.8**	**9.2**	**6.0**	—	**16.1**	**35.1**

== Results ==
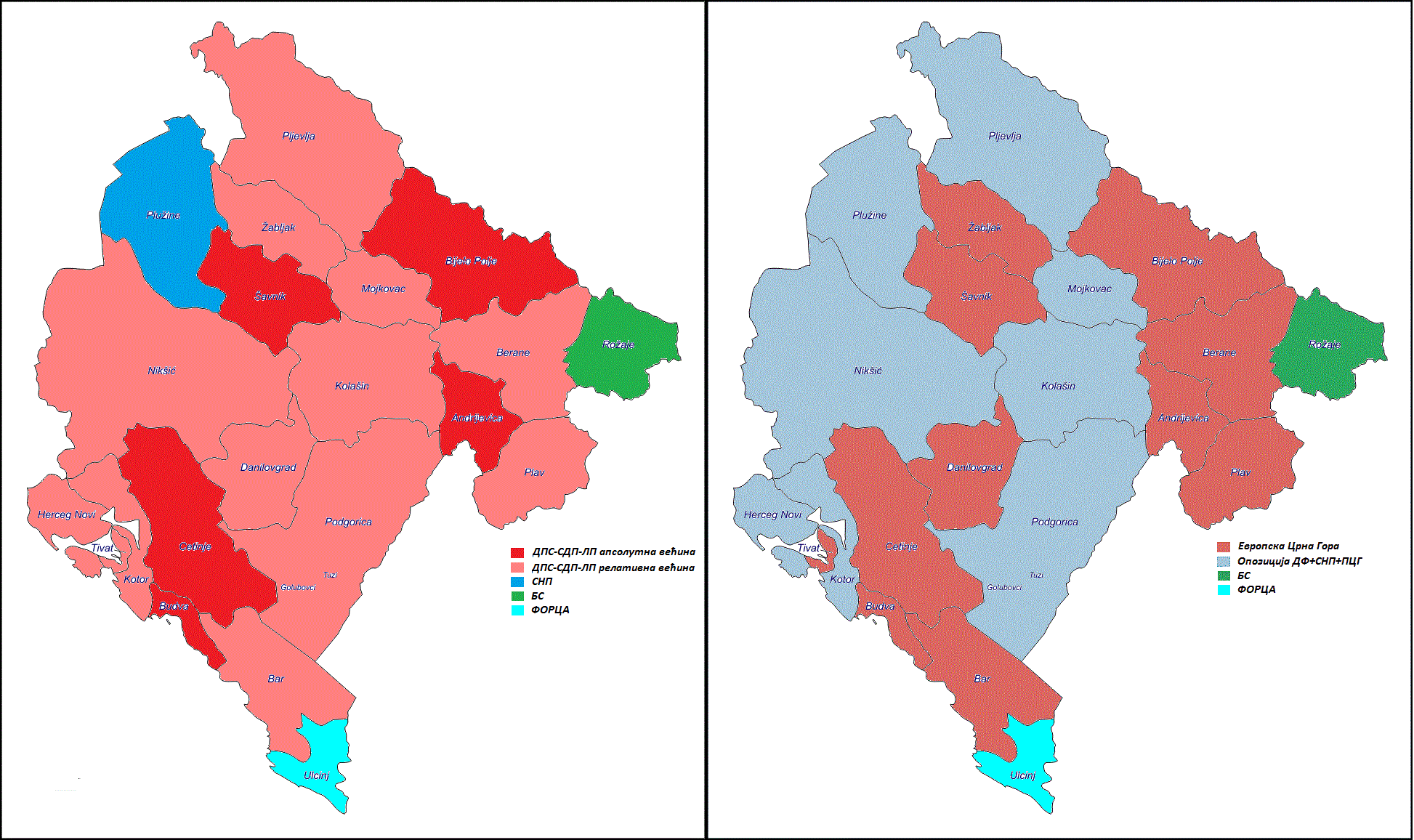
Results of election by municipality; *Red - DPS-SDP list absolute majority (left photo) *Pink - DPS-SDP list relative majority (left photo) *Blue - SNP list absolute majority (left photo) *Green and light blue - ethnic minority parties (both) *Maroon - government (DPS-SDP) majority (right) *Cyan - opposition united (DF-SNP-PCG) majority (right)

Party	Votes	%	Seats	+/–
European Montenegro	165,380	46.33	39	–7
Democratic Front	82,773	23.19	20	+7
Socialist People's Party of Montenegro	40,131	11.24	9	–7
Positive Montenegro	29,881	8.37	7	New
Bosniak Party	15,124	4.24	3	+2
Serb Unity (NS–SL–DCB)	5,275	1.48	0	New
For Unity	5,244	1.47	1	–1
Albanian Coalition	3,824	1.07	1	0
Serb National Alliance (DSS–SSR)	3,085	0.86	0	New
Democratic Union of Albanians	2,848	0.80	0	–1
Croatian Civic Initiative	1,470	0.41	1	0
Together (JKP–PUPI)	1,384	0.39	0	New
Albanian Youth League	531	0.15	0	New
Total	356,950	100.00	81	0
Valid votes	356,950	98.41		
Invalid/blank votes	5,764	1.59		
Total votes	362,714	100.00		
Registered voters/turnout	514,055	70.56		
Source: State Electoral Commission of Montenegro
