= 2023 national electoral calendar =

National and federal elections held in 2023

- Countries with national elections or referendums: Executive Legislative Executive and Legislative Referendum Executive and Referendum Legislative and Referendum Executive, Legislative and Referendum Constitutional Assembly and Referendum

This national electoral calendar for 2023 lists the national/federal elections held in 2023 in all sovereign states and their dependent territories. By-elections are excluded, though national referendums are included.

== January ==
- 8 January: Benin, Parliament
- 13–14 January: Czech Republic, President (1st round)
- 18 January: Antigua and Barbuda, House of Representatives
- 21 January: Slovakia, Constitutional Referendum
- 26 January: Tokelau, Parliament
- 27–28 January: Czech Republic, President (2nd round)
- 29 January:
  - Liechtenstein, Constitutional Referendum
  - Tunisia, Parliament (2nd round)

== February ==
- 5 February:
  - Cyprus, President (1st round)
  - Ecuador, Constitutional Referendum
  - Monaco, Parliament
- 12 February: Cyprus, President (2nd round)
- 24 February: Djibouti, Parliament
- 25 February: Nigeria, President, Senate and House of Representatives

== March ==
- 5 March: Estonia, Parliament
- 7 March: Micronesia, Parliament
- 19 March:
  - Kazakhstan, Assembly
  - Montenegro, President (1st round)
- 26 March:
  - Cuba, Parliament
  - Turkmenistan, Parliament

== April ==
- 2 April:
  - Andorra, Parliament
  - Bulgaria, Parliament
  - Finland, Parliament
  - Montenegro, President (2nd round)
- 16 April: French Polynesia, Parliament (1st round)
- 20 April: Bhutan, National Council
- 24 April: British Virgin Islands, Parliament
- 29 April: Niue, Parliament
- 30 April:
  - French Polynesia, Parliament (2nd round)
  - Paraguay, President, Senate and Chamber of Deputies
  - Uzbekistan, Constitutional Referendum

== May ==
- 7 May: Chile, Constitutional Council
- 13 May: Mauritania, Parliament (1st round)
- 14 May:
  - Thailand, House of Representatives
  - Turkey, President (1st round) and Parliament
- 21 May:
  - East Timor, Parliament
  - Greece, Parliament
- 27 May: Mauritania, Parliament (2nd round)
- 28 May: Turkey, President (2nd round)

== June ==
- 4 June: Guinea-Bissau, Parliament
- 6 June: Kuwait, Parliament
- 11 June: Montenegro, Parliament
- 18 June:
  - Mali, Constitutional Referendum
  - Switzerland, Referendums
- 24 June: Sierra Leone, President and Parliament
- 25 June:
  - Greece, Parliament
  - Guatemala, President (1st round) and Parliament

== July ==
- 4 July: Federated States of Micronesia, Constitutional Referendum
- 9 July: Uzbekistan, President
- 23 July:
  - Cambodia, National Assembly
  - Spain, Senate and Congress of Deputies
- 30 July: Central African Republic, Constitutional Referendum

== August ==
- 20 August:
  - Ecuador, President (1st round), Parliament and Referendum
  - Guatemala, President (2nd round)
- 23 August: Zimbabwe, President, Senate and National Assembly
- 26 August: Gabon, President and Parliament

== September ==
- 1 September: Singapore, President
- 9 September: Maldives, President (1st round)
- 29 September: Eswatini, House of Assembly
- 30 September:
  - Maldives, President (2nd round)
  - Slovakia, Parliament

== October ==
- 7 October: United Arab Emirates, Parliament
- 8 October: Luxembourg, Parliament
- 10 October: Liberia, President (1st round), Senate and House of Representatives
- 12 October: Gibraltar, Parliament
- 14 October:
  - Australia, Constitutional Referendum
  - New Zealand, Parliament
- 15 October:
  - Ecuador, President (2nd round)
  - Poland, Senate, Sejm and Referendum
- 22 October:
  - Argentina, President (1st round), Senate and Chamber of Deputies
  - Switzerland, Council of States and National Council (Note: Date for the National Council election and first round of the Council of States election; dates for the runoffs to the Council of States vary between the cantons.)
- 29 October: Oman, Parliament

== November ==
- 8 November: Pitcairn Islands, Island Council
- 14 November: Liberia, President (2nd round)
- 16 November: Madagascar, President
- 19 November: Argentina, President (2nd round)
- 20 November: Marshall Islands, Parliament
- 22 November: Netherlands, House of Representatives
- 30 November: Bhutan, National Assembly (1st round)

== December ==
- 3 December: Venezuela, Referendum
- 10–12 December: Egypt, President
- 17 December:
  - Chad, Constitutional Referendum
  - Chile, Constitutional Referendum
  - Serbia, Parliament
- 20 December: Democratic Republic of Congo, President and National Assembly

== Indirect elections ==
The following indirect elections of heads of state and the upper houses of bicameral legislatures took place through votes in elected lower houses, unicameral legislatures, or electoral colleges:

- Since 29 September 2022: Lebanon, President
- 14 January: Kazakhstan, Senate
- 20 January:
  - Sahrawi Republic, President
  - Trinidad and Tobago, President
- 13 February: Bangladesh, President
- 2 March: Vietnam, President
- 9 March: Nepal, President
- 10 March: China, President
- 12 March: Cameroon, Senate
- 17 March: Nepal, Vice President
- 19 April: Cuba, President
- 11 May: Micronesia, President
- 30 May: Netherlands, Senate
- 31 May: Latvia, President
- 17 July: India, Council of States
- 20 August: Republic of the Congo, Senate
- 9 September: Artsakh, President
- 16 September: Ivory Coast, Senate
- 24 September: France, Senate
- 27 September: Dominica, President
- 30 October: Nauru, President
- 13 December: Switzerland, Federal Council

== See also ==
- 2023 local electoral calendar
