= Fatmir Gjeka =

Montenegrin politician (born 1975)

Minister of Human and Minority Rights
- Incumbent
- Assumed office 28 April 2022
- Prime Minister: Dritan Abazović
- Preceded by: Zdravko Krivokapić (as acting Minister of Justice and Human and Minority Rights of Montenegro)

Chairman of Democratic Party
- Incumbent
- Assumed office 24 December 2011

Mayor of Ulcinj
- In office 24 February 2014 – 21 March 2016
- Preceded by: Nazif Cungu
- Succeeded by: Nazif Cungu

Personal details
- Born: 17 April 1975 (age 51) Bar, SR Montenegro, SFR Yugoslavia (today Montenegro)
- Party: UDSH (until 2011); Democratic Party (2011–present)
- Education: Luigj Gurakuqi University of Shkodër
- Profession: Economic, Politician

Fatmir Gjeka (Montenegrin: Fatmir Đeka; born 17 April 1975) is a Montenegrin politician. In Montenegro, he serves as Minister of Human and Minority Rights, Chairman of Democratic Party and he was Mayor of Ulcinj.

== Early life ==
He was born on 17 April 1975, in Bar, Yugoslavia (modern-day Montenegro). He is married and has two children. He completed his studies in business administration at the Faculty of Economics of University "Luigj Gurakuqi" in Shkodër in 1997. From 2005–2007 he attended postgraduate studies in entrepreneurial economics at the Faculty Economics of University of Montenegro.

== Political activity ==
From 2002–2011 he acted as secretary of the Secretariat for Budget and Finance of Ulcinj Municipality. He served as a member of the commission for financing local government and chairman of this commission for one term.

In November 2011 he was elected director of the Municipal Public Enterprise of Ulcinj. In the Constituent Assembly of the Democratic Party, held on December 24, 2011, he was elected chairman of this party. As a representative of the Albanian Coalition (Democratic Party, Albanian Alternative and Democratic League in Montenegro) he was elected Member of the Parliament of Montenegro, in the parliamentary elections held on October 14, 2012.

As an MP, he has served as chairman of the Parliamentary Club of Albanian Parties, the Croatian Civic Initiative and the Liberal Party of Montenegro.

Gjeka was elected Mayor of Ulcinj on February 24, 2014, as a candidate of the Coalition "Together for the Future of Ulcinj", FORCA and Positive Montenegro and served in this position until March 21, 2016. On June 27, 2018, he was elected president of the tourist organization of Ulcinj, a role that he continues to exercise.

== See also ==
- List of mayors of Ulcinj
