= Ministry of Human and Minority Rights (Montenegro) =

Government ministry of Montenegro

- Ministarstvo za ljudska i manjinska prava

Agency overview
- Formed: 2006
- Jurisdiction: Government of Montenegro
- Headquarters: Podgorica
- Agency executive: Fatmir Gjeka, Minister of Human and Minority Rights
- Website: mmp.gov.me

Minister of Human and Minority Rights (Montenegrin: Ministar za ljudska i manjinska prava) is the person in charge of the Ministry of Human and Minority Rights of Montenegro (Ministarstvo za ljudska i manjinska prava). In 2020, Ministry merged into the Ministry of Justice (Ministarstvo pravde).

== Minister ==
Democratic Union of Albanians Democratic Party of Socialists Democratic Party

Minister	Start of term	End of term
Fuad Nimani	10 November 2006	10 June 2009
Ferhat Dinosha	10 June 2009	4 December 2012
Suad Numanović	4 December 2012	28 November 2016
Mehmet Zenka	28 November 2016	4 December 2020
Merged with Ministry of Justice; 4 December 2020 - 28 April 2022
Fatmir Gjeka	28 April 2022	Incumbent
