= 2023 local electoral calendar =

Local elections held in 2023

This local electoral calendar for 2023 lists the subnational elections held in 2023. Referendums, recall and retention elections, and national by-elections (special elections) are also included.

== January ==
- 8 January: Taiwan, Taipai, legislative by-election
- 19 January: Tonga, Tongatapu 8, Legislative Assembly by-election
- 22 January:
  - France, National Assembly by-elections (1st round)
  - Japan, Yamanashi, prefectural governor
- 29 January:
  - Austria, Lower Austria, Landtag
  - France, National Assembly by-elections (2nd round)

== February ==
- 5 February:
  - Ecuador, local elections
  - Japan
    - Aichi, prefectural governor
    - Kitakyūshū, city mayor
- 6 February: Ethiopia, Southern Nations, Nationalities, and Peoples' Region, Regionalization referendum
- 9 February: United Kingdom, West Lancashire, House of Commons by-election
- 12 February:
  - Germany, Berlin, House of Representatives
  - Switzerland
    - Basel-Landschaft, Executive Council and Cantonal Council
    - Zürich, Executive Council and Cantonal Council
- 12–13 February: Italy
  - Lazio, President and Regional Council
  - Lombardy, President and Regional Council
- 16 February: India, Tripura, Legislative Assembly
- 19 February: Mexico, Tamaulipas, special Senate election
- 21 February: United States, Virginia's 4th congressional district, U.S. House of Representatives special election
- 24 February: Samoa, Vaimauga 3, Legislative Assembly by-election
- 25 February: Philippines, Cavite's 7th congressional district, Philippine House of Representatives special election
- 27 February: India
  - Meghalaya, Legislative Assembly
  - Nagaland, Legislative Assembly
- 28 February: United States, Chicago, Mayor, City Council, and other municipal positions

== March ==
- 4 March: Taiwan, Nantou County, legislative by-election
- 5 March:
  - Austria, Carinthia, Landtag
  - Liechtenstein, Mayors and Municipal Councils
  - Lithuania, Mayors and Municipal Councils (1st round)
- 12 March: Switzerland, Appenzell-Innerrhoden, Executive Council and Cantonal Council
- 13 March: Canada, Quebec, Saint-Henri—Sainte-Anne, National Assembly by-election
- 15 March: Netherlands, Provincial elections
- 16 March: Canada, Ontario, Hamilton Centre, Legislative Assembly by-election
- 18 March:
  - Australia, Northern Territory, Arafura, Legislative Assembly by-election
  - Nigeria, state elections
- 19 March:
  - Kazakhstan, Local elections
  - Lithuania, Municipal elections
- 21 March: United States, Jacksonville, Mayor
- 25 March: Australia, New South Wales, Legislative Assembly and Legislative Council
- 26 March:
  - France, Ariège's 1st constituency, National Assembly by-election (1st round)
  - Thailand, Sa Kaeo province, Chief Executive of Provincial Administrative Organization

== April ==
- 1 April:
  - Australia, Aston, House of Representatives by-election
  - France, Second constituency for French residents overseas, National Assembly by-election (1st round)
- 2 April:
  - France, National Assembly by-elections (1st round)
  - Switzerland
    - Geneva, Executive Council and Cantonal Council
    - Lucerne, Executive Council and Cantonal Council
    - Ticino, Executive Council and Cantonal Council
- 2–3 April: Italy, Friuli-Venezia Giulia, President and Regional Council
- 3 April: Canada, Prince Edward Island, Legislative Assembly
- 4 April: United States
  - Illinois, Chicago, Mayor run-off
  - Colorado, Colorado Springs, Mayor
  - Colorado, Denver, Mayor
  - California, Los Angeles, City Council, District 6 special election
  - Wisconsin, Supreme Court
- 9 April: Japan, unified local elections (prefectural governors, prefectural assemblies, major city mayors, major city assemblies)
- 15 April: France, National Assembly by-elections (2nd round)
- 16 April:
  - Argentina
    - Neuquén, provincial elections
    - Río Negro, provincial elections
  - France, National Assembly by-elections (2nd round)
- 23 April:
  - Austria, Salzburg, Landtag
  - Japan
    - Unified local elections (city/town/village/special ward mayors, city/town/village/special ward assemblies)
    - National Diet, House of Representatives by-elections
      - Chiba 5th district
      - Wakayama 1st district
      - Yamaguchi 2nd district
      - Yamaguchi 4th district
    - National Diet, House of Councillors, Oita at-large district by-election
- 24 April: Canada, New Brunswick, provincial by-elections in:
  - Bathurst East-Nepisiguit-Saint-Isidore
  - Dieppe
  - Restigouche-Chaleur
- 30 April: Moldova, Gagauzia, Governor

== May ==
- 2 May: United States, Lincoln, Mayor
- 4 May: United Kingdom, local elections
- 6 May:
  - Australia, Tasmania, (Launceston, Murchison and Rumney) Legislative Council
  - United States, Dallas, Mayor
- 7 May: Argentina
  - Jujuy, provincial elections
  - La Rioja, provincial elections
  - Misiones, provincial elections
- 10 May: India, Karnataka, Legislative Assembly
- 14 May:
  - Albania, Local elections
  - Argentina
    - La Pampa, provincial elections
    - Salta, provincial elections
    - San Juan, provincial elections (chamber of deputies)
    - Tierra del Fuego, provincial elections
  - Germany
    - Bremen, Bürgerschaft and city councils
    - Schleswig-Holstein, Local elections
  - Italy, local elections (1st round)
- 16 May: United States, Jacksonville, Mayor run-off
- 18 May: United Kingdom, Northern Ireland, local elections
- 20 May: Gambia, local elections
- 24 May: Nigeria, Cross River State, Local Government Councils and Chairmen
- 25 May: Somalia, Puntland, Municipal elections
- 28 May:
  - Italy, local elections (2nd round)
  - Spain
    - Regional elections
      - Aragon, Cortes
      - Asturias, General Junta
      - Balearic Islands, Parliament
      - Canary Islands, Parliament
      - Cantabria, Parliament
      - Castilla–La Mancha, Cortes
      - Ceuta, Assembly
      - Extremadura, Assembly
      - La Rioja, Parliament
      - Madrid, Assembly
      - Melilla, Assembly
      - Murcia, Regional Assembly
      - Navarre, Parliament
      - Valencian Community, Corts
    - Local elections
      - Basque Country, Juntas Generales
      - Balearic Islands, Island Councils
      - Barcelona, City Council
      - Madrid, City Council
      - Seville, City Council
      - Valencia, City Council
      - Zaragoza, City Council
- 29 May: Canada, Alberta, Legislative Assembly

== June ==
- 4 June:
  - Japan, Aomori, prefectural governor
  - Mexico
    - State of Mexico and Coahuila: gubernatorial elections
    - Coahuila: Congressional elections
    - Tamaulipas: Senatorial by-election
- 11 June:
  - Argentina
    - Corrientes, provincial elections
    - San Luis, provincial elections
    - Tucumán, provincial elections
  - Luxembourg, local elections
- 12 June: Guyana, local elections
- 15 June: Pakistan, Karachi, Mayor and Karachi Metropolitan Corporation
- 18 June: Taiwan, Hualien, Fuli, local by-election
- 19 June: Canada, federal by-elections in:
  - Notre-Dame-de-Grâce—Westmount
  - Oxford
  - Portage—Lisgar
  - Winnipeg South Centre
- 23 June: Qatar, municipal elections
- 24 June: Canada, British Columbia, provincial by-elections in:
  - Langford-Juan de Fuca
  - Vancouver-Mount Pleasant
- 25 June:
  - Argentina
    - Córdoba, provincial elections
    - Formosa, provincial elections
  - Guatemala, Guatemala City, Mayor
  - Italy, Molise, regional election
- 26 June: Canada, Toronto, mayoral by-election

== July ==
- 2 July: Argentina, San Juan, provincial elections (governor)
- 8 July:
  - Botswana, Serowe West, National Assembly by-election
  - Philippines, Carmona, cityhood plebiscite
- 13 July: Tonga, Tongatapu 10, Legislative Assembly by-election
- 15 July: Australia, Fadden, House of Representatives by-election
- 20 July: United Kingdom
  - Selby and Ainsty, House of Commons by-election
  - Somerton and Frome, House of Commons by-election
  - Uxbridge and South Ruislip, House of Commons by-election
- 23 July: Japan, Gunma, prefectural governor
- 24 July: Canada, Calgary Heritage, House of Commons by-election
- 27 July: Canada, Ontario, provincial by-elections in:
  - Kanata—Carleton
  - Scarborough—Guildwood
- 29 July: Australia, Western Australia, Rockingham, Legislative Assembly by-election
- 30 July:
  - Argentina, Chubut, provincial elections
  - Japan, Sendai, city assembly

== August ==
- 3 August: United States, Nashville, Mayor
- 5 August: Taiwan, Changhua, Beidou, local by-election
- 6 August: Japan, Saitama, prefectural governor
- 8 August: Canada, Nova Scotia, Preston, Legislative Assembly by-election,
- 10 August: Canada, Saskatchewan, provincial by-elections in:
  - Lumsden-Morse
  - Regina Coronation Park
  - Regina Walsh Acres
- 12 August: Malaysia, state elections
  - Kedah, Legislative Assembly
  - Kelantan, Legislative Assembly
  - Terengganu
    - Legislative Assembly
    - Kuala Terengganu by-election
  - Penang, Legislative Assembly
  - Selangor, Legislative Assembly
  - Negeri Sembilan, Legislative Assembly
- 13 August: Argentina, Santa Cruz, provincial elections
- 14 August: Trinidad and Tobago, Trinidad, local elections
- 26 August: Australia, Victoria, Warrandyte, state by-election

== September ==
- 3 September: Japan, Iwate, prefectural governor and assembly
- 9 September: Malaysia
  - Pulai, House of Representatives by-election
  - Johor, Simpang Jeram, Legislative Assembly by-election
- 10 September:
  - Argentina, Santa Fe, provincial elections
  - Russia, regional elections
- 11 September: Norway, municipal elections
- 14 September: United States, Nashville, Mayor (2nd round)
- 15 September: Samoa
  - Faleata No. 4, Legislative Assembly by-election
  - Siʻumu, Legislative Assembly by-election
  - Vaʻa-o-Fonoti, Legislative Assembly by-election
- 16 September: Taiwan, Kinmen, Wuqiu, local by-election
- 17 September:
  - Argentina, Chaco, provincial elections
  - Armenia, Yerevan, City Council
- 24 September:
  - Argentina, Mendoza, provincial elections
  - Portugal, Madeira, Legislative Assembly

== October ==
- 2 October: Canada, Quebec, Jean-Talon, National Assembly by-election,
- 3 October: Canada, Manitoba, Legislative Assembly
- 5 October:
  - United Kingdom, Rutherglen and Hamilton West, by-election
  - United States, Memphis, Mayor
- 7 October: Malaysia, Pahang, Pelangai, Legislative Assembly by-election
- 8 October:
  - Germany
    - Bavaria, Landtag
    - Hesse, Landtag
  - Greece, local elections (1st round)
- 9 October: Norway, Svalbard, local council
- 11 October: Mozambique, Mayors and Municipal Councils
- 14 October: United States, Louisiana, Governor, State Senate, State House, other executive offices (1st round)
- 15 October:
  - Finland, Åland, Parliament
  - Greece, local elections (2nd round)
- 16 October: Canada, Nunavut, Iqaluit, municipal election
- 19 October: United Kingdom
  - Mid Bedfordshire, House of Commons by-election
  - Tamworth, House of Commons by-election
- 21 October:
  - Australia, Christmas Island and Cocos (Keeling) Islands, local councils
  - Taiwan, Taoyuan, Fuxing District, local by-election
- 22 October:
  - Argentina
    - Buenos Aires, provincial elections
    - Buenos Aires City, city elections
    - Catamarca, provincial elections
    - Entre Ríos, provincial elections
  - Italy
    - 2023 Italian by-elections
    - Trentino-Alto Adige/Südtirol, Provincial Councils
  - Japan
    - Miyagi, prefectural assembly
    - National Diet, by-elections
      - Nagasaki 4 to the House of Representatives
      - Tokushima-Kōchi to the House of Councillors
  - Thailand, Kanchanaburi province, Chief Executive of Provincial Administrative Organization
- 24 October: Antigua and Barbuda, St. Mary's South by-election
- 29 October:
  - Bulgaria, local elections
  - Colombia, regional and municipal elections
- 30 October:
  - Philippines
    - Barangay Chairs, Barangay Councils, Youth Chairs and Youth Councils
    - Bulacan, San Jose del Monte conversion plebiscite

== November ==
- 4 November: Malaysia, Sarawak, Jepak, Legislative Assembly by-election
- 5 November: Moldova, local elections
- 7 November:
  - India
    - Chhattisgarh, Legislative Assembly
    - Mizoram, Legislative Assembly
  - United States
    - Arizona, Tucson, Mayor
    - Connecticut
      - Hartford, Mayor
      - New Haven, Mayor
    - Idaho, Boise, Mayor
    - Indiana
      - Carmel, Mayor
      - Evansville, Mayor
      - Indianapolis, Mayor
    - Kentucky, Governor, Attorney General, other executive positions
    - Maine, Portland, Mayor
    - Massachusetts, Worcester, Mayor
    - Minnesota
      - Minneapolis, City Council
    - Mississippi
      - Governor, Attorney General, other executive positions
      - State Senate and House of Representatives
    - New Jersey, State Senate and General Assembly
    - New York, New York City, City Council
    - Pennsylvania
      - Allegheny County, Executive
      - Philadelphia, Mayor and City Council
    - Tennessee, Knoxville, Mayor
    - Texas, Houston, Mayor
    - Virginia, State Senate and House of Delegates
    - Washington, Spokane, Mayor
- 11 November: Nigeria
  - Bayelsa State, Governor
  - Imo State, Governor
  - Kogi State, Governor
- 12 November: Japan, Fukushima, prefectural assembly
- 14 November: Canada, Northwest Territories, Legislative Assembly
- 17 November: India
  - Chhattisgarh, Legislative Assembly
  - Madhya Pradesh, Legislative Assembly
- 18 November: United States, Louisiana, Attorney General, other executive offices (2nd round)
- 19 November: Moldova, local elections (2nd round)
- 21 November:
  - United States
    - Utah
      - Salt Lake City, Mayor
      - Utah's 2nd congressional district, U.S. House of Representatives special election
- 25 November:
  - India, Rajasthan, Legislative Assembly
  - New Zealand, Port Waikato, House of Representatives by-election
- 26 November:
  - Japan, Kōchi, prefectural governor
  - North Korea, Provincial People's Assemblies, County People's Assemblies and Municipal People's Assemblies
- 30 November:
  - Canada, Ontario, Kitchener Centre, Legislative Assembly by-election,
  - India, Telangana, Legislative Assembly

== December ==
- 2 December: Malaysia: Kemaman, House of Representatives by-election
- 10 December: Hong Kong, District Councils
- 17 December: Serbia, Local elections
  - Belgrade, City Assembly
  - Vojvodina, Provincial Assembly
- 18 December: Iraq, Governorate elections

== Unknown date ==
- Nigeria
  - Anambra, Local Government Councils and Chairmen
  - Kwara, Local Government Councils and Chairmen
