= Mayor of Ulcinj =

List of mayors

Mayor of Ulcinj Municipality
- Kryetari i Komunës së Ulqinit (Albanian); Predsjednik Opštine Ulcinj (Montenegrin)
- Coat of arms of Ulcinj
- Incumbent; Genci Nimanbegu since May 30, 2024
- Seat: Bulevardi Gjergj Kastrioti Skënderbeu, 85360 Ulcinj, Montenegro
- Appointer: Municipal Assembly
- Term length: Four years, renewable
- Inaugural holder: Mehmet Bardhi
- Formation: 1990
- Website: www.ul-gov.me

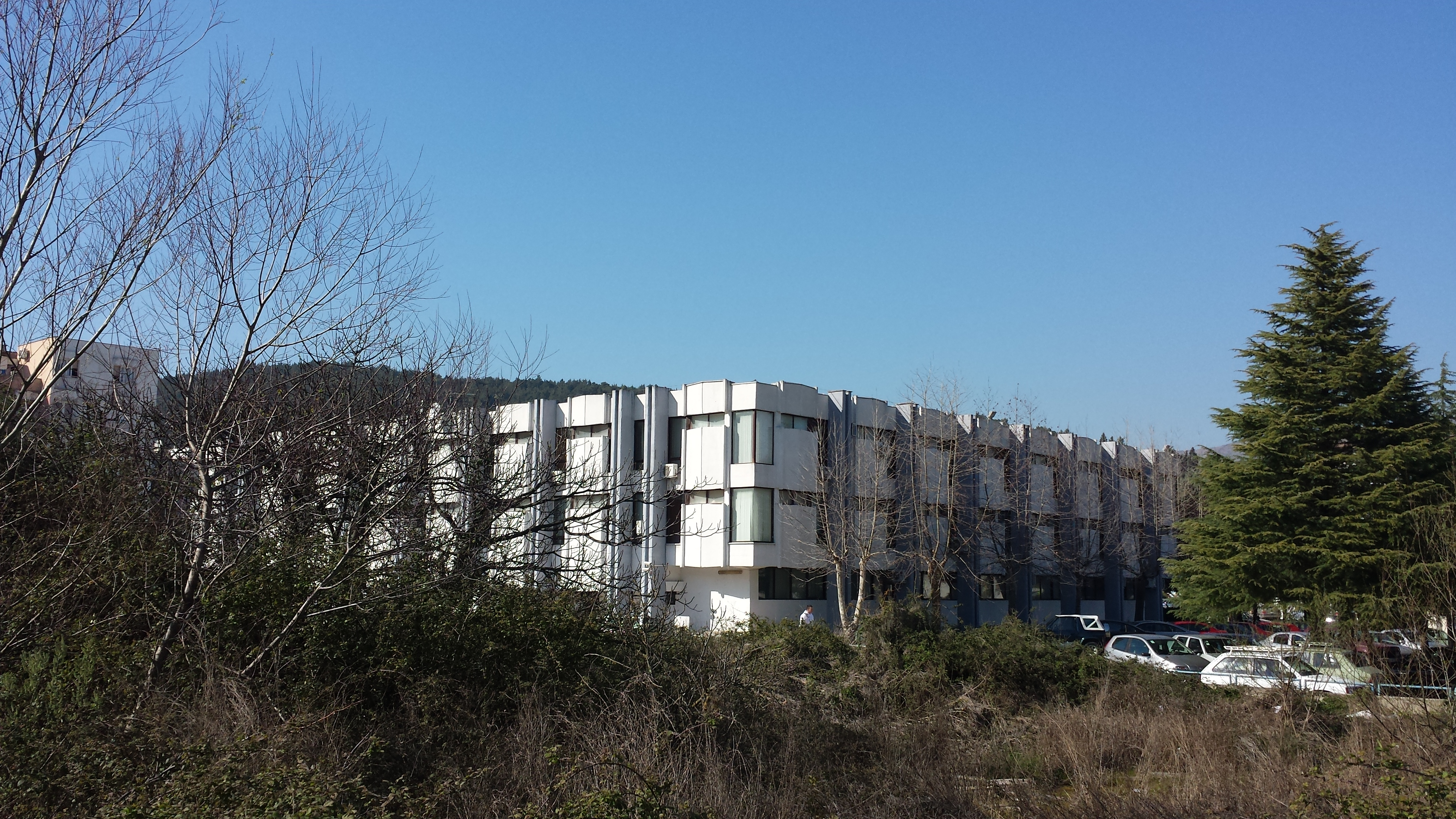
The building of Ulcinj Municipal Assembly, where the seat of the mayor is located.

The mayor of Ulcinj, officially Mayor of the Ulcinj Municipality (Albanian: Kryetari i Komunës së Ulqinit, Montenegrin: Predsjednik Opštine Ulcinj), is head of the executive branch of the government of Ulcinj Municipality. The current officeholder is Omer Bajraktari of the United Reform Action who was elected by Municipal Assembly on 3 June 2022, following the 2022 local elections.

== List of Mayors of Ulcinj (1990–present) ==
Parties

LDMZ UDSH FORCA PD DPS URA

No.	Name (Birth–Death)	Portrait	Term of office		Political party	Notes
Mayor of Ulcinj Municipality; 1990–present
1	Mehmet Bardhi		1990	1996	Democratic League in Montenegro	
2	Osman Rexha (1939–)		1996	1998	Democratic League in Montenegro	
3	Skender Hoxha (1947–)		1998	2002	Democratic League in Montenegro	
4	Fuad Nimani (1948–2012)		24 June 2002	24 September 2006	Democratic Union of Albanians	
5	Gëzim Hajdinaga (1964–)		24 September 2006	28 September 2011	Democratic Union of Albanians	
6	Nazif Cungu (1958–)		28 September 2011	24 February 2014	New Democratic Force	
7	Fatmir Gjeka (1975–)		24 February 2014	21 March 2016	Democratic Party	
8	Nazif Cungu (1958–)		21 March 2016	17 May 2018	New Democratic Force	
9	Loro Nrekiq (1954–)		17 May 2018	17 March 2021	Democratic Party of Socialists	
10	Aleksandar Dabović (1984–)		17 March 2021	3 June 2022	Democratic Party of Socialists	
11	Omer Bajraktari (1988–)		3 June 2022	30 May 2024	United Reform Action	
12	Genci Nimanbegu (1971–)		30 May 2024	Incumbent	New Democratic Force	
