= Gëzim Hajdinaga =

Montenegrin politician (born 1964)

Mayor of Ulcinj
- In office 2006–2011
- Preceded by: Fuad Nimani
- Succeeded by: Nazif Cungu

Minister of Human and Minority Rights
- In office 14 July 2001 – 6 October 2006
- Prime Minister: Milo Đukanović
- Preceded by: Ferhat Dinosha

Vice - Minister of Human and Minority Rights
- In office 9 September 1999 – 14 July 2001
- Prime Minister: Milo Đukanović

Personal details
- Born: 2 January 1964 (age 62) Ulcinj, Montenegro, Yugoslavia
- Party: Democratic Union of Albanians (1993–2013); Democratic Party (2016–present)
- Spouse: Florinda Hajdinaga

Gëzim Hajdinaga is a Montenegrin politician and former member of the Democratic Union of Albanians.

== Biography ==
Hajdinaga was born in Ulcinj, Montenegro to an Albanian family on 2 January 1964. He is an electrical engineer, but he spent most of his professional career in politics. He is member of Democratic Union of Albanians since the formation of the party. For two terms he served as Minister for the protection of rights of national and ethnic groups in the Government of Montenegro. In 2006, he was elected as Mayor of Ulcin. He owns property in Shkodra, Albania. His father purchased the property in Shkodra in 1990 and turned it out to be a good investment. As a mayor he contributed a lot in protecting the Ottoman architecture in Ulcinj, rebuilding the Sailor's Mosque and the restoration of Çarshia.

== See also ==
- Mayor of Ulcinj
- Ulcinj
- Democratic Union of Albanians

== Notes ==
Political offices
Preceded by Fuad Nimani	Mayor of Ulcinj; 2006 - 2011	Succeeded by Nazif Cungu
