= Albanians Decisively =

Albanians Decisively Shqiptarët të vendosur Albanci odlučno
- Leader: Genci Nimanbegu (Forca)
- Founded: 2016
- Dissolved: 2020
- Headquarters: Ulcinj
- Ideology: Albanian minority interest Pro-Europeanism; Social conservativism
- Political position: Centre-right
- Parliament (2020): 0 / 81
- Local Parliaments (2020): 0 / 816

The Albanians Decisively (Albanian: Shqiptarët të vendosur; Montenegrin: Albanci odlučno, Албанци одлучнo) was a socially conservative Albanian minority politics political alliance in Montenegro.

== History ==
The alliance was formed by three major Albanian parties in Montenegro, the Albanian Alternative (AA), the New Democratic Power - FORCA and the Democratic Union of Albanians (DUA), prior to the 2016 elections. Genci Nimanbegu (FORCA) headed the joint electoral list at the parliamentary election in October 2016.

== Coalition members ==
- New Democratic Force (Forca) of Nazif Cungu, Mayor of Ulcinj
- Albanian Alternative (AA) of Nik Gjeloshaj, Mayor of Tuzi
- Democratic Union of Albanians (DUA) of Mehmet Zenka, Minister of Human and Minority Rights in the Government of Montenegro
