= 2023 Jepak by-election =

2023 by-election in Sarawak, Malaysia

- 4 November 2023

N67 Jepak seat in the Sarawak State Legislative Assembly
	First party	Second party	Third party
Candidate	Iskandar Turkee	Stevenson Joseph Sumbang	Chieng Lea Ping
Party	PBB	PBK	ASPIRASI
Alliance	GPS
Popular vote	9,638	854	431
Percentage	88.24%	7.82%	3.95%
Jepak assemblyman before election
Talib Zulpilip (died)
Gabungan Parti Sarawak (PBB)
Elected Jepak assemblyman
Iskandar Turkee
Gabungan Parti Sarawak (PBB)

The 2023 Jepak by-election was a by-election that was held on 4 November 2023 for the Sarawak State Legislative Assembly seat of Jepak. It was called following the death of its incumbent, Talib Zulpilip from kidney complications on 15 September 2023.

The by-election was the latest in Sarawak after the 2017 Tanjong Datu by-election.

== Background ==
Jepak is a state constituency in the Malaysian state of Sarawak, and one of the four constituencies in the federal constituency of Bintulu. As of 15 September 2023, Supplementary Electoral Roll used by Election Commission (EC) for this by-election, Jepak has 22,804 eligible registered voters, including 43 voters from the police force. The significant increase of voters from 14,643 during the 2021 state election to 22,804 is due to the previous election has not implemented the UNDI18.

Talib was a member of the Sarawak State Legislative Assembly, representing Jepak for six terms since winning the seat in 1996. He was a member of the supreme council appointed by Parti Pesaka Bumiputera Bersatu (PBB), which is a component party of Gabungan Parti Sarawak (GPS), the current ruling party of Sarawak. He is also the chairman of PBB's Jepak branch. In the Sarawak cabinet, he has held the position of Junior Minister of Tourism and Heritage, and Minister in the Premier Office (Integrity and Ombudsman). Talib's poor health condition previously raised concerns among his party members in his branch, who urged him to step down and give way to younger candidates before the 2021 Sarawak state election. However he was retained as candidate by GPS-PBB in the election, successfully defending his seat in a 4-corner contest by 4,243 votes majority over his nearest rival. On 15 September 2023, Talib died of kidney complications at Normah Medical Specialist Centre in Kuching, leaving his constituency vacated at the next day.

== Nomination and campaign ==
On 18 October 2023, GPS through Premier and its Chairman Abang Abdul Rahman Johari Abang Openg, announced Iskandar Turkee, former state chairman of National Anti-Drugs Agency (NADA) as the candidate representing the coalition in the by-election. A local candidate from Kampung Sebiew who previously was not a member of any component party in GPS including PBB, Iskandar was chosen by consensus within PBB and support from other GPS parties.

Parti Sedar Rakyat Sarawak (SEDAR) president, Othman Abdillah has said on 20 September that the party may consider fielding a candidate in the by-election, but later on 23 September clarified his statement, and proposing a unified opposition to face GPS.

Meanwhile, Parti Keadilan Rakyat (PKR) announced on 25 September that they will not enter as a sign of solidarity to GPS, who are one of the partners in the Pakatan Harapan-Barisan Nasional led federal government. Although urged to compete in the election by fellow PH component party Democratic Action Party (DAP), who is in opposition in Sarawak Assembly, PKR stood on its decision.

On 28 September, Parti Aspirasi Rakyat Sarawak (ASPIRASI) announced through its president that the party will contest the by-election. The party later confirmed the statement and fills Chieng Lea Ping, a businessman by trade, as their candidate on 17 October.

Parti Bumi Kenyalang (PBK) also confirmed its intention to contest in this by-election, having pick Stevenson Joseph Sumbang as its candidate. The party was the first among all the contesting parties to announce its candidate, on 5 October. A former Royal Malaysian Police personnel, Stevenson will contest in Jepak for the second time, having lost to Talib in the 2021 state election while garnering only 587 votes.

Candidates nomination day was announced by Election Commission (EC) to be on 21 October 2023. On the nomination day, it was confirmed that there will be a 3-corner fight between Iskandar (GPS-PBB), Chieng (ASPIRASI) and Stevenson (PBK) after nominations closed.

== Timeline ==
Date	Event
25 September 2023	Issue of the Writ of Election
21 October 2023	Nomination Day
21 October 2023 – 3 November 2023	Campaigning Period
31 October 2023	Early Polling Day For Postal and Advance Voters
4 November 2023	Polling Day

== Election results ==
Sarawak state by-election, 4 November 2023: Jepak Upon the death of incumbent, Talib Zulpilip
Party	Candidate	Votes	%	∆%
GPS	Iskandar Turkee	9,638	88.24	+18.80
PBK	Stevenson Joseph Sumbang	854	7.82	+1.33
ASPIRASI	Chieng Lea Ping	431	3.95	+3.95
Total valid votes		10,769		
Total rejected ballots		152		
Unreturned ballots		2		
Turnout		10,923	48.57	
Registered electors		22,804		
Majority		8,784		
GPS hold		Swing		

== Previous results ==
Sarawak state election, 2021: Jepak
Party	Candidate	Votes	%
GPS	Talib Zulpilip	6,277	69.44
PSB	Raba'ah Tudin	2,034	22.50
PBK	Stevenson Joseph Sumbang	587	6.49
Independent	Tuah Kazan	141	1.56
Total valid votes		9,039	100.00
Total rejected ballots		146	
Unreturned ballots		34	
Turnout		9,219	62.96
Registered electors		14,643	
Majority		4,243	
GPS gain		Swing	
Source(s) https://lom.agc.gov.my/ilims/upload/portal/akta/outputp/1718688/PUB687.pdf

== Aftermath ==
Iskandar, the winner of the by-election, were sworn in as the new MLA for Jepak on 20 November at the start of the Sarawak State Assembly sitting. He subsequently joined PBB, and was appointed its chairman for Jepak branch on 4 May 2024, filling in the vacancy left by the late Talib.
