= Democratic Centre of Montenegro =

Democratic Centre of Montenegro Demokratski centar Crne Gore Демократски центар Црне Горе
- Founder: Goran Batrićević
- Founded: 2009
- Dissolved: 2014
- Split from: Movement for Changes
- Headquarters: Podgorica
- Ideology: Economic liberalism Souverainism; Pro-Europeanism; Atlanticism
- Political position: Centre

The Democratic Centre of Montenegro (Demokratski centar Crne Gore, DC) was the minor short-lived centrist political party in Montenegro.

== History ==
It was formed in 2009, following the split in the leadership of the Movement for Changes (PzP). Its founder and president was Goran Batričević, former vice-president of the PzP. Party regarded itself as the moral and ideological heir of the original Group for Changes non-governmental organization.

At the 2009 parliamentary election the party participated within a centrist "For a Different Montenegro" coalition with Liberal Party of Montenegro (LP CG), which won only 2,7% of votes, just below the 3% electoral threshold. After the election party activity significantly decreased, but it remained formally active, until its dissolution in 2014.

== Parliamentary elections ==
Parliament of Montenegro
Year	Popular vote	% of popular vote	Overall seats won	Coalition	Government
2009	8,759	2.7%	0 / 81	with LP	extra-parliamentary
