= Iskandar Turkee =

Malaysian politician

Yang Berhormat Iskandar Turkee MLA
- ايسکاندار تورک

Member of the Sarawak State Legislative Assembly for Jepak
- Incumbent
- Assumed office 2023
- Preceded by: Talib Zulpilip

Director of National Anti-Drugs Agency Sarawak
- In office 2021–2023
- Minister: Saifuddin Nasution

Personal details
- Born: Iskandar bin Turkee Sarawak
- Citizenship: Malaysian
- Party: PBB
- Other political affiliations: Gabungan Parti Sarawak
- Spouse: Dayang Loha Awang Sahari
- Occupation: Politician

Iskandar bin Turkee is a Malaysian politician from PBB. He has served as the Member of the Sarawak State Legislative Assembly for Jepak since 2023. He is also the former Director of National Anti-Drugs Agency Sarawak.

== Election results ==
Sarawak State Legislative Assembly
Year	Constituency	Candidate	Votes	Pct.	Opponent(s)	Votes	Pct.	Ballots cast	Majority	Turnout
2023	N67 Jepak	Iskandar Turkee (PBB)	9,638	88.24%	Stevenson Joseph Sumbang (PBK)	854	7.82%	10,923	8,784	48.57%
2023	N67 Jepak	Iskandar Turkee (PBB)	9,638	88.24%	Chieng Lea Ping (ASPIRASI)	431	3.95%	10,923	8,784	48.57%
