= Albanian Forum =

Montenegrin political party

Albanian Forum Forumi shqiptar Albanski forum
- President: Nik Gjeloshaj
- Founded: 2026
- Headquarters: Tuzi
- Ideology: Albanian minority interests Pro-Europeanism; Conservatism
- Political position: Center-right
- Parliament: 2 / 81
- Mayors: 1 / 25
- Local Parliaments: 26 / 844

Albanian Forum (Montenegrin: Albanski forum, Albanian: Forumi shqiptar) is an political party representing the Albanian minority in Montenegro, initially founded as a coalition of Albanian political parties such as Albanian Alternative, National Union of Albanians and the Democratic League of Albanians in 2019. In May of 2026, leaders of the coalition parties merged into a single party called Forumi shqiptar.

The party is led by Nik Gjeloshaj, meanwhile, its deputy chairmen are Ferhat Dinosha and Ivan Ivanaj.

== Electoral performance ==
=== Parliamentary elections ===
Election	Party leader	Performance				Alliance	Government
Election	Party leader	Votes	%	Seats	+/–	Alliance	Government
2023	Nik Gjeloshaj	5,767	1.91%	2 / 81	▲2	AF	Government

== See also ==
- Albanians Decisively
- Albanian Alternative
