= Fuad Nimani =

Montenegrin-Albanian politician

Fuad Nimani (Cyrillic: Фуад Нимани) was a Montenegrin-Albanian politician, born in Shkodër, Albania to an Albanian family from Ulcinj, Montenegro in 1948. He finished the elementary school in Ulcinj, secondary school in Pristina, Kosovo and he graduated at the Faculty of Mathematics at the Universiteti i Prishtinës. He died on 25 April 2012 in Ulcinj.

== Public engagement ==
He served as vice-president and president of one of the main Albanian party in Montenegro Democratic Union of Albanians. From 2001 to 2006 he served as Mayor of Ulcinj, and after that as Minister of Human and Minority Rights at the Montenegrin government to 2009.

== See also ==
- Mayor of Ulcinj
- Ulcinj
- Democratic Union of Albanians

Political offices
Preceded by Skender Hoxha	Mayor of Ulcinj; 2001–2006	Succeeded by Gëzim Hajdinaga
Preceded by Gëzim Hajdinaga	Minister of Human and Minority Rights; 2006–2009	Succeeded by Ferhat Dinosha
