= 2009 Montenegrin parliamentary election =

- 29 March 2009
- Turnout: 66.19% (▼5.18pp)
Party	Leader	Vote %	Seats	+/–
ECG	Milo Đukanović	51.94	48	+5
SNP	Srđan Milić	16.84	16	+8
NSD	Andrija Mandić	9.22	8	−2
PzP	Nebojša Medojević	6.03	5	−6
UDSH	Ferhat Dinosha	1.47	1	0
FORCA	Nazif Cungu	0.91	1	+1
DS–AA	Mehmet Bardhi	0.89	1	0
AKP	Vasilj Siništaj	0.81	1	New
This lists parties that won seats. See the complete results below.
Prime Minister before	Prime Minister after
Milo Đukanović; DPS	Milo Đukanović; DPS

Early parliamentary elections were held in Montenegro on 29 March 2009. In addition to elections for the unicameral Parliament of Montenegro, concurrent local elections were held in Nikšić and Budva, as well as municipal presidential elections in Herceg Novi and Tivat. The parliamentary elections were the eighth since the reintroduction of multi-party system in 1990, and the second since regaining full independence in 2006.

== Background ==
President Filip Vujanović called the parliamentary elections on 27 January 2009, after the parliament decided the previous day to shorten its term, although this decision was controversial.

Constitutional Act that proclaimed the new constitution of 2007 stipulated that elections had to be held by the end of 2009.

Application of electoral lists occurred from 16 February to 4 March 2009, and election silence began on 27 March 2009. The number of MPs being elected was uncertain, because the matter was never solved before the election was scheduled. Based on a count of one MP per six thousand eligible voters, the number of MPs should have been 82. However, the Constitution stipulated 81, as there were in the present outgoing session, and this was the number of MPs actually elected.

The pre-electoral process had been marked by several major incidents, such as the revocation of citizenship of Predrag Popović, president of the People's Party, the violation of the human right to work during the formation of the coalition treaty of Prime Minister Milo Đukanović's ruling coalition, which would make party affiliation a criterion for employment, and repeated protests by discontented workers pushed into poverty. Additionally, representative groups of Montenegro's minority communities unanimously declared the forthcoming elections illegal and contrary to constitutional protections granted to ethnic communities.

== Electoral system ==
Elections in Montenegro are free, with the right of secret ballot guaranteed. Because the country has a single national voting district, all votes cast at individual voting stations across the country went towards a single total. The electoral threshold was 3%, so electoral lists receiving under three percent of the total votes cast were crossed out, and the MPs within the assembly were split amongst the remaining lists. Seats were distributed by the D'Hondt method, which slightly favors leading lists above the smaller ones. The Parliament's mandate lasts four years.

== Campaign ==
Several alliances were created prior to the elections; the Coalition for a European Montenegro led by Milo Đukanović included the Democratic Party of Socialists of Montenegro, the Social Democratic Party of Montenegro, the Croatian Civic Initiative and the Bosniak Party. The People's Coalition was formed by the People's Party and the Democratic Serb Party, whilst For a Different Montenegro, led by Goran Batričević, consisted of the Democratic Centre and the Liberal Party of Montenegro.

== Results ==
The Coalition for a European Montenegro won an absolute majority of seats, with approximately 66 percent voter turnout, securing Milo Đukanović (DPS) new term as prime minister.

Party	Votes	%	Seats			
Party	Votes	%	General	Albanian	Total	+/–
European Montenegro	168,290	51.94	47	1	48	5
Socialist People's Party of Montenegro	54,547	16.84	16	0	16	8
New Serb Democracy	29,883	9.22	8	0	8	–2
Movement for Changes	19,546	6.03	5	0	5	–6
People's Coalition (NS–DSS)	9,448	2.92	0	0	0	–3
For a Different Montenegro (LP–DC)	8,759	2.70	0	0	0	–1
Party of United Pensioners and the Disabled	7,691	2.37	0	0	0	New
Democratic Union of Albanians	4,747	1.47	0	1	1	0
Serb National List (SSR–SSN)	4,291	1.32	0	0	0	New
Bosniaks and Muslims, Together as One	3,489	1.08	0	0	0	New
New Democratic Force	2,939	0.91	0	1	1	+1
Albanian List (DSCG–AA)	2,898	0.89	0	1	1	0
Albanian Coalition "Perspective"	2,619	0.81	0	1	1	New
Serb Fatherland Party	2,446	0.75	0	0	0	New
Montenegrin Communists	1,594	0.49	0	0	0	0
Party of Democratic Prosperity	805	0.25	0	0	0	–
Total	323,992	100.00	76	5	81	0
Valid votes	323,992	98.23				
Invalid/blank votes	5,827	1.77				
Total votes	329,819	100.00				
Registered voters/turnout	498,305	66.19				
Source: Nohlen & Stöver
