= 2023 Qatari municipal elections =

On 23 June 2023, municipal elections were held in Qatar. Members of the Central Municipal Council (CMC) in Qatar were held for the seventh time. There was a total of 102 candidates, including 4 women.
