= Jepak =

Electoral district in Sarawak, Malaysia

Jepak (N67)
Sarawak constituency

State constituency
- Legislature: Sarawak State Legislative Assembly
MLA
Vacant
- Constituency created: 1996
- First contested: 1996
- Last contested: 2026

Demographics
- Population (2020): 35,299
- Electors (2023): 22,804

Jepak is a state constituency in Sarawak, Malaysia, that has been represented in the Sarawak State Legislative Assembly since 1996.

The state constituency was created in the 1996 redistribution and is mandated to return a single member to the Sarawak State Legislative Assembly under the first past the post voting system.

== Demographics ==
Ethnic breakdown of Jepak's electorate as of 2022
1. Malay-Muslim bumiputera (54.3%)
2. Sarawak bumiputera (38.2%)
3. Chinese (6.20%)
4. Other ethnicities (1.30%)

== History ==
As of 2020, Jepak has a population of 35,299 people.

=== Polling districts ===
According to the gazette issued on 31 October 2022, the Jepak constituency has a total of 6 polling districts.

State constituency	Polling Districts	Code	Location
Jepak (N67)	Kuala Tatau	217/67/01	SK Kuala Annau; SK Kuala Tatau; SK Kuala Serupai; SK Sg. Setulan
Jepak (N67)	Sri Dagang	217/67/02	SMK Baru Bintulu
Jepak (N67)	Jepak	217/67/03	SK Kampung Jepak Bintulu; RH Joshua Manit Ak Buyu; SK Sg. Setiam; SK Sg. Selat
Jepak (N67)	Segan	217/67/04	RH Anthony Silas; SK Ulu Segan; Tadika KEMAS Kuala Segan
Jepak (N67)	Sungai Nyigu	217/67/05	SK Kg. Baru
Jepak (N67)	RPR Sibew	217/67/06	SK Bintulu

=== Representation history ===
Members of the Legislative Assembly for Jepak
Assembly	No	Years	Member	Party
Constituency created from Balingian and Kemena
14th	N54	1996-2001	Talib Zulpilip	BN (PBB)
15th	N54	2001-2006	Talib Zulpilip	BN (PBB)
16th	N58	2006-2011	Talib Zulpilip	BN (PBB)
17th	N58	2011-2016	Talib Zulpilip	BN (PBB)
18th	N67	2016-2018	Talib Zulpilip	BN (PBB)
18th	N67	2018-2021	Talib Zulpilip	GPS (PBB)
19th	N67	2021-2023	Talib Zulpilip	GPS (PBB)
19th	N67	2023–2026	Iskandar Turkee	GPS (PBB)

== Election results ==
Sarawak state election, 2026: Jepak
Party	Candidate	Votes	%	∆%
GPS				▲
PH				▲
Total valid votes				
Total rejected ballots				
Unreturned ballots				
Turnout				
Registered electors				
Majority				

Sarawak state by-election, 4 November 2023: Jepak Upon the death of incumbent, Talib Zulpilip
Party	Candidate	Votes	%	∆%
GPS	Iskandar Turkee	9,638	88.24	▲18.80
PBK	Stevenson Joseph Sumbang	854	7.82	▲1.33
ASPIRASI	Chieng Lea Ping	431	3.95	▲3.95
Total valid votes		10,769	100.00	
Total rejected ballots		152		
Unreturned ballots		2		
Turnout		10,923	48.57	▼14.39
Registered electors		22,804		
Majority		8,784	81.57	▲34.63
GPS hold		Swing		

Sarawak state election, 2021: Jepak
Party	Candidate	Votes	%	∆%
GPS	Talib Zulpilip	6,277	69.44	▲69.44
PSB	Raba'ah Tudin	2,034	22.50	▲22.50
PBK	Stevenson Joseph Sumbang	587	6.49	▲6.49
Independent	Tuah Kazan	141	1.56	▲1.56
Total valid votes		9,039	100.00	
Total rejected ballots		146		
Unreturned ballots		34		
Turnout		9,219	62.96	▼4.99
Registered electors		14,643		
Majority		4,243	46.94	▲1.35
GPS gain		Swing		
Source(s) https://lom.agc.gov.my/ilims/upload/portal/akta/outputp/1718688/PUB687.pdf

Sarawak state election, 2016: Jepak
Party	Candidate	Votes	%	∆%
BN	Talib Zulpilip	6,342	68.82	▲6.74
PKR	Abdul Jalil Bujang	2,141	23.23	▼3.35
PAS	Kiprawi Aman	406	4.41	▲4.41
Independent	Wong Hau Ming	190	2.06	▲2.06
STAR	Mohammed Anuar Abd Hamid	136	1.48	▲1.48
Total valid votes		9,215	100.00	
Total rejected ballots		140		
Unreturned ballots		14		
Turnout		9,369	67.95	▼1.41
Registered electors		13,789		
Majority		4,201	45.59	▲10.09
BN hold		Swing		
Source(s) "Federal Government Gazette - Notice of Contested Election, State Legislative Assembly of the State of Sarawak [P.U. (B) 190/2016]" (PDF). Attorney General's Chambers of Malaysia. 25 April 2016. Archived from the original (PDF) on 2017-06-12. "Senarai Calon yang Disahkan Layak Bertanding Pilihan Raya Dewan Undangan Negeri ke-11". Election Commission of Malaysia. 25 April 2016. Archived from the original on 25 April 2016.Archived 25 April 2016 at the Wayback Machine

Sarawak state election, 2011: Jepak
Party	Candidate	Votes	%	∆%
BN	Talib Zulpilip	5,470	62.08	▼11.24
PKR	Abdul Jalil Bujang	2,342	26.58	▲26.58
Independent	Abdul Kuddus Ramlee	477	5.41	▲5.41
SNAP	Ramli Malaka	433	4.91	▲4.91
Independent	Awang Abdillah Awang Nasar	89	1.02	▲1.02
Total valid votes		8,811	100.00	
Total rejected ballots		133		
Unreturned ballots		58		
Turnout		9,002	69.36	▲12.06
Registered electors		12,979		
Majority		3,128	35.50	▼11.14
BN hold		Swing		
Source(s) "Federal Government Gazette - Results of Contested Election and Statements of the Poll after the Official Addition of Votes Sarawak [P.U. (B) 245/2011]" (PDF). Attorney General's Chambers of Malaysia. 29 April 2011.

Sarawak state election, 2006: Jepak
Party	Candidate	Votes	%	∆%
BN	Talib Zulpilip	4,997	73.32	▼0.99
DAP	Wan Saimi Wan Dahlan	1,818	26.68	▲21.76
Total valid votes		6,815	100.00	
Total rejected ballots		87		
Unreturned ballots		3		
Turnout		6,905	57.30	▼11.88
Registered electors		12,049		
Majority		3,179	46.64	▲17.28
BN hold		Swing		

Sarawak state election, 2001: Jepak
Party	Candidate	Votes	%	∆%
BN	Talib Zulpilip	6,002	74.31	▼13.95
Independent	Bolhassan Kambar	1,455	18.01	▲18.01
DAP	Wan Saimi Wan Dahlan	397	4.92	▲4.92
Independent	Julaihi Zainuddin	223	2.76	▲2.76
Total valid votes		8,077	100.00	
Total rejected ballots		94		
Unreturned ballots		2		
Turnout		8,173	69.18	▲11.88
Registered electors		11,814		
Majority		4,547	56.30	▲9.66
BN hold		Swing		

Sarawak state election, 1996: Jepak
Party	Candidate	Votes	%
BN	Talib Zulpilip	5,892	88.26
Independent	Awang Abdillah Awang Nasar	605	9.06
Independent	Dick Winie	179	2.68
Total valid votes		6,676	100.00
Total rejected ballots		105	
Unreturned ballots		22	
Turnout		6,803	63.58
Registered electors		10,700	
Majority		5,287	79.19
This was a new constituency created.
