= Aleksa and Dritan – Count Bravely! =

Aleksa and Dritan – Count Bravely! Aleksa i Dritan – Hrabro se broji!
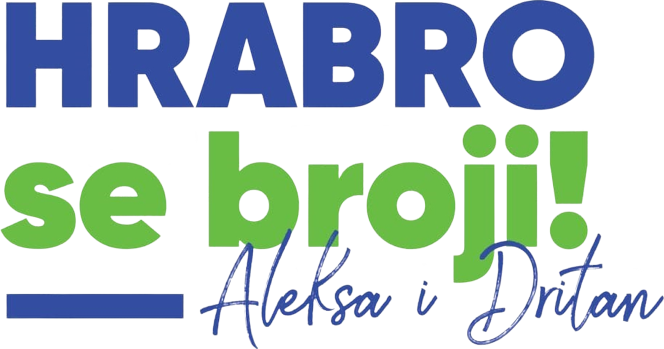
- Leader: Aleksa Bečić
- Founders: Aleksa Bečić; Dritan Abazović
- Founded: 17 May 2023
- Dissolved: July 2023
- Preceded by: Peace is Our Nation; In Black and White
- Ideology: Anti-corruption; Populism; Pro-Europeanism
- Political position: Centre
- European affiliation: European Greens
- Coalition members: Democratic Montenegro; United Reform Action
- Colors: Green; Blue
- Slogan: «Count Bravely!» «Hrabro se broji!»
- Parliament: 11 / 81
- Mayors: 4 / 25
- Local Parliaments: 130 / 847

The Aleksa and Dritan – Count Bravely! (Montenegrin: Алекса и Дритан – Храбро се броји!, romanized: Aleksa i Dritan – Hrabro se broji!) was a Montenegrin political coalition between Democratic Montenegro and United Reform Action, established on 17 May 2023.

== History ==
On 17 May 2023, an agreement was published to create a coalition between the two parties and that they would go to the 2023 parliamentary election as a single list. The first on the list of the coalition is Aleksa Bečić, the leader of Democratic Montenegro, and the second is Dritan Abazović, the leader of the United Reform Action and the former Prime Minister of Montenegro.

== Ideology and goals ==
Accelerated economic development, protection of minority rights, social justice, solidarity and comprehensive health care are stated as goals of political action of the coalition. The coalition ruled out any possibility of participating in government with the formerly ruling Democratic Party of Socialists (DPS) after the 2023 parliamentary election. Coalition leader Aleksa Bečić also emphasized the fight against the mafia, corruption and xenophobia during the election campaign.

== Member parties ==
Party		Ideology	Leader	No. of seats
Democratic Montenegro; Demokratska Crna Gora; Демократска Црна Гора	DCG	Conservative liberalism Populism; Pro-Europeanism	Aleksa Bečić	7 / 81
United Reform Action; Ujedinjena reformska akcija Уједињена реформска акција	URA	Populism; Progressivism; Pro-Europeanism	Dritan Abazović	4 / 81

== Electoral performance ==
=== Parliamentary elections ===
Election	Party leader	Performance				Rank	Government
Election	Party leader	Votes	%	Seats	+/–	Rank	Government
2023	Aleksa Bečić	37,730	12.5%	11 / 81	New	4th	Government (DCG); Opposition (URA)
