= Talib Zulpilip =

Malaysian politician (1951–2023)

Yang Berbahagia Datuk Talib Zulpilip PGBK PBK
- طالب ذولڤيليڤ

Member of the Sarawak State Legislative Assembly for Jepak
- In office 8 September 1996 – 15 September 2023
- Preceded by: Position established
- Succeeded by: Iskandar Turkee (GPS–PBB)
Ministerial offices
Minister in the Sarawak Premier's Department
In office 6 May 2017 – 3 January 2022
Premier	Abang Johari Tun Openg
Assistant Minister of Housing and Urbanisation
In office 2016–2017 Serving with Abdul Karim Rahman Hamzah
Minister	Abang Johari Tun Openg
Portfolio	Urbanisation
Assistant Minister of Infrastructure Development and Transport
In office 2016–2017 Serving with Lee Kim Shin and Liwan Lagang
Minister	James Jemut Masing
Portfolio	Infrastructure Development
Assistant Minister of Tourism
In office 2011–2016 Serving with Gramong Juna
Minister	Abang Johari Tun Openg
Assistant Minister of Tourism
In office 2009–2011 Serving with Mong Dagang
Minister	George Chan Hong Nam

Personal details
- Born: 13 September 1951 Crown colony of Sarawak
- Died: 15 September 2023 (aged 72) Normah Medical Specialist Centre, Kuching, Sarawak, Malaysia
- Resting place: Samariang Muslim Cemetery, Kuching, Sarawak, Malaysia
- Citizenship: Malaysian
- Party: Parti Pesaka Bumiputera Bersatu (PBB) (–2023)
- Other political affiliations: Barisan Nasional (BN) (–2018); Gabungan Parti Sarawak (GPS) (2018–2023)
- Spouse: Zaliha Abdullah
- Occupation: Politician

Talib bin Zulpilip (13 September 1951 – 15 September 2023) alternatively spelt as Talip Zulpilip, was a Malaysian politician. He served as a member of the Sarawak State Legislative Assembly for Jepak seat from 1996 until his death in 2023.

== Election results ==
Sarawak State Legislative Assembly
Year	Constituency	Candidate	Votes	Pct	Opponent(s)	Votes	Pct	Ballots cast	Majority	Turnout
1996	N58 Jepak	Talib Zulpilip (PBB)	5,892	88.26%	Awang Abdillah Awang Nasar (IND)	605	9.06%	6,803	5,287	63.58%
1996	N58 Jepak	Talib Zulpilip (PBB)	5,892	88.26%	Dick Winie (IND)	179	2.68%	6,803	5,287	63.58%
2001	N58 Jepak	Talib Zulpilip (PBB)	6,002	74.31%	Bolhassan Kambar (IND)	1,455	18.01%	8,173	4,547	69.18%
2001	N58 Jepak	Talib Zulpilip (PBB)	6,002	74.31%	Wan Saimi Wan Dahlan (DAP)	397	4.92%	8,173	4,547	69.18%
2001	N58 Jepak	Talib Zulpilip (PBB)	6,002	74.31%	Julaihi Zainuddin (IND)	223	2.76%	8,173	4,547	69.18%
2006	N58 Jepak	Talib Zulpilip (PBB)	4,997	73.32%	Wan Saimi Wan Dahlan (DAP)	1,818	26.68%	6,905	3,179	57.30%
2011	N58 Jepak	Talib Zulpilip (PBB)	5,470	62.08%	Abdul Jalil Bujang (PKR)	2,342	26.58%	9,002	3,128	69.36%
2011	N58 Jepak	Talib Zulpilip (PBB)	5,470	62.08%	Abdul Kuddus Ramlee (IND)	477	5.41%	9,002	3,128	69.36%
2011	N58 Jepak	Talib Zulpilip (PBB)	5,470	62.08%	Ramli Malaka (SNAP)	433	4.91%	9,002	3,128	69.36%
2011	N58 Jepak	Talib Zulpilip (PBB)	5,470	62.08%	Awang Abdillah Awang Nasar (IND)	89	1.02%	9,002	3,128	69.36%
2016	N67 Jepak	Talib Zulpilip (PBB)	6,342	68.82%	Abdul Jalil Bujang (PKR)	2,141	23.23%	9,369	4,201	67.95%
2016	N67 Jepak	Talib Zulpilip (PBB)	6,342	68.82%	Kiprawi Aman (PAS)	406	4.41%	9,369	4,201	67.95%
2016	N67 Jepak	Talib Zulpilip (PBB)	6,342	68.82%	Wong Hau Ming (IND)	190	2.06%	9,369	4,201	67.95%
2016	N67 Jepak	Talib Zulpilip (PBB)	6,342	68.82%	Mohammed Anuar Abd Hamid (STAR)	136	1.48%	9,369	4,201	67.95%
2021	N67 Jepak	Talib Zulpilip (PBB)	6,277	69.44%	Raba'ah Tudin (PSB)	2,034	22.50%	9,219	4,243	62.96%
2021	N67 Jepak	Talib Zulpilip (PBB)	6,277	69.44%	Stevenson Joseph Sumbang (PBK)	587	6.49%	9,219	4,243	62.96%
2021	N67 Jepak	Talib Zulpilip (PBB)	6,277	69.44%	Tuah Kazan (IND)	141	1.56%	9,219	4,243	62.96%

== Death ==
Talib Zulpilip died at Normah Specialist Medical Center, Kuching on 15 September 2023, at 5.50 pm due to kidney complications. He was safely buried at the Samariang Islamic Cemetery that night.

== Honours ==
- Sarawak
  - Commander of the Order of the Star of Hornbill Sarawak (PGBK) – Datuk (2003)
  - Officer of the Order of the Star of Hornbill Sarawak (PBK) (1993)
  - Gold Medal of the Sarawak Independence Diamond Jubilee Medal (2023)
