= 2023 Central African constitutional referendum =

- 30 July 2023

Results
Choice	Votes	%
Yes	960,660	95.03%
No	50,235	4.97%
Valid votes	1,010,895	95.06%
Invalid or blank votes	52,580	4.94%
Total votes	1,063,475	100.00%
Registered voters/turnout	1,858,230	57.23%

A constitutional referendum was held in the Central African Republic on 30 July 2023, proposing, among other things, to abolish term limits for the president and increasing presidential terms from five years to seven years.

Concerns were expressed about the conduct of the referendum. The main opposition boycotted the referendum. The referendum was approved, enabling Faustin-Archange Touadéra to rule indefinitely.

== Background ==
Incumbent president Faustin-Archange Touadéra's party, the United Hearts Movement, proposed abolishing term limits in 2022, arguing that presidential term limits were uncommon in many neighboring countries. Critics and opposition parties held protests as the reform would allow president Touadéra to run again in 2025 for a third term. President Touadéra installed a 55-member commission (all appointed by him) to draft the proposed changes in August. However, the Constitutional Court ruled the committee unconstitutional and annulled it, stating that a constitutional reform process could not be triggered without consent from the Senate, which at the time had still not been established according to the 2015 constitution. Touadéra responded by sacking the head of the Constitutional Court, illegal under the 2015 constitution, which opposition parties saw as a self coup. The head of the court, Danièle Darlan, alleged that she had been approached earlier that year by the chargé d'affaires of the Russian Embassy, Bangui, who asked her how they could ensure Touadéra remained in power.

President Touadéra announced in May 2023 he would hold a referendum on 30 July to change the constitution. This has reportedly been divisive, and the surrounding situation in the country has been volatile. The text of the new constitution was not made public until 10 July, less than three weeks before the vote. Additionally, the official preparations for the referendum occurred shortly before a temporary recall of some members of the Wagner Group, who had been assisting in securing several regions of the country, following their rebellion in June.

== Changes ==
- Presidential term limits would be abolished. The presidential term would also be extended from five to seven years.
- To be eligible to run for the presidency, a person, as well as their parents, would need to have been born in the Central African Republic, not hold dual citizenship, have resided in the country for no less than two years, and hold a university degree.
- The position of Vice President would be created. The position would be appointed by the president, and would serve to replace the president in the case of a permanent vacancy in power, as well as being tasked with organizing a new presidential election within three months in that case.
- The Senate, de jure established by the 2015 constitution but which was never set up, would be abolished. A Chamber of Traditional Chiefdoms would be created instead dedicated to the valorization of habits and customs.
- The National Assembly would no longer have control over mining contracts, with this privilege instead being awarded to the President.
- The composition of the Constitutional Court would be changed:
  - Nine total members changed to 11
  - One member appointed by the president raised to three
  - One member appointed each by the President of the National Assembly and President of the Senate changed to 3 appointed by the National Assembly as a whole
  - Six members appointed by legal associations changed to five
  - Requirement of equal members of males and females ± 1 would be abolished

== Results ==
Provisional results released by the government on 6 August stated that the referendum was approved by over 95% of those voting, with a turnout of around 60%. These figures were contested by the opposition, which boycotted the referendum, with the opposition estimating actual turnout as below 15%. Some opposition figures also claimed that "no" ballots were not present at several polling stations. The Constitutional Court validated the results of the referendum on 20 August.

Choice	Votes	%
For	960,660	95.03
Against	50,235	4.97
Total	1,010,895	100.00
Valid votes	1,010,895	95.06
Invalid votes	47,152	4.43
Blank votes	5,428	0.51
Total votes	1,063,475	100.00
Registered voters/turnout	1,858,230	57.23
Source: Oubangui Media

== Reactions ==
The United States State Department issued a press release through spokesperson Matthew Miller, stating that "[t]he United States notes with deep reservations reports of low voter participation and concerns over secrecy of the ballot. Free and fair elections, with inclusive electoral processes are essential for any democracy." The State Department further called on the Central African Republic's government to issue a date for local elections.
