= Albanian Coalition "Perspective" =

The Albanian Coalition "Perspective" is an Albanian political party in Montenegro.

== History ==
The party received 0.8% of the vote in the 2009 elections, winning one seat. For the 2012 elections it joined the For Unity coalition, alongside the New Democratic Power – FORCA (which also held one seat) and the Citizens Initiative. The For Unity alliance received 1.45% of the vote, winning a single seat.
