= Serb List (2012) =

Serb List Српска листа Srpska lista
- Leader: Dobrilo Dedeić
- Founded: 5 January 2012
- Split from: New Serb Democracy
- Headquarters: Podgorica
- Ideology: Serbian nationalism Serbian-Montenegrin unionism Right-wing populism Social conservatism Hard Euroscepticism
- Political position: Right-wing to far-right
- Colours: Red, blue and white (Serbian national tricolor)

The Serb List (Serbian: Српска листа / Srpska lista) was a minor Serbian nationalist and political party in Montenegro, established on 5 January 2012.

== Ideology ==
The party supports the far-right Serbian Radical Party of Vojislav Šešelj in Serbia, and the view that Montenegro should return to a union with Serbia as two brotherly states. Controversially, the party has proposed that Radovan Karadžić, Ratko Mladić and Šešelj become honoured citizens of towns Šavnik, Pljevlja and Kolašin, as their families hail from the region and they have worked for a common Serb cause. It has earlier asked for the rehabilitation of Blažo Đukanović and another 24 Montenegrin Chetniks executed in 1943.

== History ==
The initial "Serb List" coalition established in 2006, was transformed into the New Serb Democracy in 2009. Some of the members of the former alliance decided to once again establish a party under that name.

The (new) Serb List was established on 5 January 2012, with the assembly choosing Rajo Vojinović as the president. It was created by merging the Party of Serb Radicals, Serb Club and independent intellectuals close to the former Serbian People's Party (SNS). Its currently has no seats in the Parliament, and is led by Dobrilo Dedeić, a former member of SNS and NOVA.

== Elections ==
=== Parliamentary elections ===
Parliament of Montenegro
Year	Popular vote	% of popular vote	Overall seats won	Coalition	Government
2012	5,275	1.45%	0 / 81	with NS—DCB	extra-parliamentary
2016	did not run	did not run	0 / 81	did not run	extra-parliamentary

=== Presidential elections ===
President of Montenegro
Election	Candidate	#	1st round vote	% of pop. vote	2nd round vote	% of pop. vote
2013	did not run	—N/a	—	—	—	—
2018	Dobrilo Dedeić	7th	1,363	0.41%		
