= 2023 Montenegrin parliamentary election =

- 11 June 2023
- All 81 seats in Parliament; 41 seats needed for a majority
- Turnout: 56.28% (▼20.36pp)
Party	Leader	Vote %	Seats	+/–
PES (Note: Including Civis and UCG members integrated within the Europe Now! list)	Milojko Spajić	25.53	24	+22
DPS (Note: Including SD, LP and UDSh members integrated within the DPS-led list)	Danijel Živković	23.22	21	−12
ZBCG	Milan Knežević	14.74	13	−2
Count Bravely!	Aleksa Bečić	12.48	11	−1
BS	Ervin Ibrahimović	7.08	6	+3
SNP–Demos	Vladimir Joković	3.13	2	−4
FSh (Note: Including LDSh and UNSh members integrated within the ASh-led list)	Nik Gjeloshaj	1.91	2	+2
ASH (Note: Including LDMZ, FORCA, DP and Movement for Tuzi)	Genci Nimanbegu	1.50	1	−1
HGI	Adrijan Vuksanović	0.74	1	+1
This lists parties that won seats. See the complete results below.
Most voted-for party by municipality
PES! DPS ZBCG BS
SNP–DEMOS FSH ASH
Prime Minister before	Prime Minister after
Dritan Abazović; URA	Milojko Spajić; Europe Now!

Parliamentary elections were held in Montenegro on 11 June 2023. Parliament had been dissolved by President Milo Đukanović just three days before the 2023 presidential elections were held, in which he lost to Europe Now! candidate Jakov Milatović.

Europe Now! emerged as the largest party in Parliament, winning 24 of the 81 seats. The Together! alliance led by the Democratic Party of Socialists (DPS) finished second with 21 seats, the first time the DPS failed to win most seats since the introduction of multi-party politics in 1990. Voter turnout was 56%, the lowest turnout since 1990.

== Background ==
=== 42nd government ===
Following the 2020 elections three opposition lists, For the Future of Montenegro (ZBCG), Peace is Our Nation (MNN) and the United Reform Action (URA), agreed to form a technocratic cabinet led by university professor Zdravko Krivokapić, ending 29 years of DPS rule. According to the final agreement between the parties, the new government's mandate would be limited to one year, and its primary goals would be fighting organized crime and corruption and depoliticizing governmental and judicial institutions. A reform of electoral laws was also planned, after which "fair" elections were planned. Right-wing Democratic Front announced limited support for the Krivokapić Cabinet, hoping for new parliamentary elections in late 2021. Đukanović announced future activities within the "sovereigntist bloc", together with its long-standing minor coalition partners, the Social Democrats (SD) and Liberal Party (LP), as well with some newly formed nationalist parties and initiatives, invoking his role in restoring Montenegrin independence in 2006, as well accusing the new cabinet of threatening Montenegro's national interests, sovereignty and independence due to open Serbian nationalist talking points from certain ministers. Most notably, Minister of Justice Vladimir Leposavić openly denied the Srebrenica genocide, for which he was voted out of the cabinet. On 4 February 2022, after talks of replacing the government with a minority cabinet supported by either of the two dominant political forces (DPS or DF) and headed by Dritan Abazović, the government collapsed following a no-confidence vote.

=== 43rd government ===
The DPS agreed to support a minority government, which was formed on 28 April 2022 by URA, the Socialist People's Party (SNP), the Social Democratic Party (SDP) and Civis and some ethnic minority parties. However, Abazović became closer to Serbian president Aleksandar Vučić and prioritized "regional cooperation" over European integration, saying Vučić-backed initiatives such as Open Balkan would bring Montenegro closer to European living standards. Minister of European Affairs Jovana Marović resigned from the government and the URA for reasons including Abazović refusing to consider the risks of Open Balkan. After an agreement between Montenegro and the Serbian Orthodox Church on 3 August 2022, the DPS withdrew its support, announcing a no-confidence vote. On 19 August 2022, just before midnight and after a day of complex debate in Parliament, the no-confidence vote passed. After several unsuccessful attempts at forming a new government over several months, Đukanović dissolved the Parliament on 16 March 2023, three days before presidential elections — and scheduled parliamentary elections for 11 June 2023. Đukanović lost the presidential elections to Jakov Milatović of Europe Now!.

== Electoral system ==
The 81 seats of the Parliament of Montenegro are elected in a single nationwide constituency using closed list proportional representation. Seats are allocated using the d'Hondt method with a 3% electoral threshold. However, minority groups that account for no more than 15% of the population in a district are given an exemption that lowers the electoral threshold to 0.7%. The parties of the same minority are summed up when calculating the seats to a maximum of three seats. A separate exemption is given to ethnic Croats whereby if no list representing the population passes the 0.7% threshold, the list with the most votes will win one seat if it receives more than 0.35% of the vote.

== Electoral lists ==
Electoral list	Leader	Note
It is Clear! — Bosniak Party — Ervin Ibrahimović	Ervin Ibrahimović	M
HGI — On the right side of the world	Adrijan Vuksanović	M
Justice for All — Vladimir Leposavić	Vladimir Leposavić	
SNP – DEMOS – For You.	Vladimir Joković	
People's Coalition – Unanimously (DHP–PCG– –SCG–DSS–PZPV)	Dejan Vukšić	
Albanian Alliance (FORCA–PD–LSMZ)	Genci Nimanbegu	M
Turnaround for a Safe Montenegro – Srđan Perić	Srđan Perić	
Movement for Changes – Montenegro First – Reforms to Save the Country	Nebojša Medojević	
Yes, We Can! – For Civic Montenegro	Dragica Perović Ivanović	
Together! For the Future that Belongs to You (DPS–SD–LP–UDSh)	Danijel Živković	
Europe Now!	Milojko Spajić	
SDP – For Our Home	Nikola Đurašković	
Aleksa and Dritan – Count Bravely! (Democrats–URA)	Aleksa Bečić	
For the Future of Montenegro (NSD–DNP–RP)	Milan Knežević	
Albanian Forum "Besa for European Development" (ASh–LDSh-UNSh)	Nik Gjeloshaj	M

== Opinion polls ==
Poll results are listed in the table below in reverse chronological order, showing the most recent first, and using the date the survey's fieldwork was done, as opposed to the date of publication. If such date is unknown, the date of publication is given instead. The highest percentage figure in each polling survey is displayed in bold, and the background shaded in the leading party's colour. In the instance that there is a tie, then no figure is shaded. The lead column on the right shows the percentage-point difference between the two parties with the highest figures. When a specific poll does not show a data figure for a party, the party's cell corresponding to that poll is shown empty. The threshold for a party to elect members is 3%.

LOESS curve of the polling for the 2023 Montenegrin Parliamentary Election.

Date	Polling firm/source	Together!			ZBCG		PzP	People's coalition		UCG	For You!		Count Bravely!		BS	SDP	ASh	Forca	PES!	Others	Lead
Date	Polling firm/source	DPS LP	SD	UDSh	NSD	DNP	PzP	Prava	DHP	UCG	SNP	Demos	DCG	URA	BS	SDP	ASh	Forca	PES!	Others	Lead
**Results**		**23.23**			**14.75**		**0.66**	**1.2**		**with PES**	**3.13**		**12.48**		**7.08**	**2.98**	**1.88**	**1.5**	**25.53**	**5.58**	**2.3**
May 2023	NSPM	22.1			15.3		<1	2.2		<1	2.4		12.9		4.3	<1	<1	<1	**32.5**	8.3 (Note: NARODNA 4.2%, with 4.1% being below 1% of support)	10.4
May 2023	CeDem	24.1 (Note: DPS only)	1.9	<1	13.2			<1	<1	<1	2.1	<1	11.1	4.4	5.1	2.2	1.9		**29.1**	5.2 (Note: SPP 1.1%, with 4.1% being below 1% of support)	5
Apr 2023	Redfield & Wilton	20	1	<1	17			<1	<1	<1	1	<1	6	6	1	1	<1	<1	**44**	3 (Note: Below 1% of support)	24
Feb 2023	MB/CeDem (Note: Hypothetical poll)	**34.4**			21.8						17.4			1.1	4.6	w.DPS	3.6		18.2	n/a	11.5
Feb 2023	MB/CeDem	**29** (Note: DPS 28.9%, LP 0.1%)	2.9	0.4	17.5			0.6	0.9	0.6	1.4	0.4	13.3	4.5	4	3.9	2.4	–	17.4	2 (Note: Including HGI 0.5%, S 0.4%)	11.5
Dec 2022	CeDem	**28.1** (Note: DPS 27.7%, LP 0.4%)	2.9	1.7	14.2			1.1	2.2	0.9	3.2	0.4	13.1	4.9	4.1	3.3	1.3	0.8	15.2	2.6 (Note: PP 0.6%, HGI 0.5%, Civis 0.4%, S 0.3%)	12.9
Sep 2022	Datapraxis/Ipsos	**33.1** (Note: DPS 31.8%, LP 1.3%)	2	–	12.3			0.9	–	2.1	2.3	1.6	9.4	10.2 (Note: CnB alliance)	3.2	6.2	0.7	–	13.6	2.4	19.5
June 2022	CeDem	**28.2**	2.6	1.8	14			1.6	–	1	3.8	<1	14.9	4.8	3.3	3.4	2.3	<1	10.9	6.1	13.3
May 2022	RMA	**23.5**	2.8	<1	17.9			2.3	–	2	8.5	1.5	12.4	9.2	6.4	5.8	<1	<1	3.7	4	5.6
Jan 2022	NSPM	**26.4**	2.2	<1	15			2.5	11	<1	2.8	1.2	17.1	7.8	3.7	5.6	2.1		–	2.6	9.3
Dec 2021	CeDem	**30.5**	2.4	<1	20.4			1.8	–	2	2.9	19.3		6.2	6.1	4.3	2.4	<1	–	1.7	8.1
June 2021	CeDem	**31**	3.4	1.2	18.7			1.9	4.9	1.3	3.5	1.6	18.4	6.4	4.4	3	1.8	1.1	–	2.3	11
Oct 2020	Damar	**32.5**	3.4	0.8 (Note: In coalition with PD)	28.8						15.8			11	3.5	2.5	1.6		–	0.1	3.7
Sep 2020	NSPM	20.8	2.6	–	4.7	3.6	1	4.4	**24.5**	0.3	3.1	0.8	13.8	11.3	3.4	2.3	2.1		–	1.6	3.4
Sep 2020	CeDem	29.2	4.8	0.9	**34.8**						14.1			8.3	3.8	2	1.9		–	2.1	5.6
Sep 2020	CeDem	**30.5**	5.1	0.7	20.8			1.8	–	0.3	6.6	2.1	14.5	9.2	3.8	2.3	1.7	0.5	–	2.3	9.7
**Aug 2020**	**Election results**	**35.1**	**4.1**	**1.1**	**32.5**						**12.5**			**5.5**	**3.9**	**3.1**	**1.6**		–	**0.4**	**2.5**

== Results ==
Party	Votes	%	Seats	+/–
Europe Now!	77,203	25.53	24	+22
Together! (DPS–SD–LP–UDSh)	70,228	23.22	21	−12
For the Future of Montenegro (NSD–DNP–RP)	44,565	14.74	13	−2
Aleksa and Dritan – Count Bravely! (Democrats–URA)	37,730	12.48	11	−1
Bosniak Party	21,423	7.08	6	+3
SNP–DEMOS	9,472	3.13	2	−4
Social Democratic Party of Montenegro	9,010	2.98	0	−2
Justice for All	8,380	2.77	0	New
Albanian Forum (ASh–LDSh–UNSh)	5,767	1.91	2	+2
Turnaround for a Safe Montenegro	4,833	1.60	0	New
Albanian Alliance (FORCA–PD–LSMZ)	4,512	1.49	1	–1
People's Coalition (DHP–PCG–SCG–DSS–PZPV)	3,630	1.20	0	−1
Croatian Civic Initiative	2,226	0.74	1	+1
Movement for Changes	1,993	0.66	0	−5
Yes, We Can!	1,444	0.48	0	New
Total	302,416	100.00	81	0
Valid votes	302,416	99.05		
Invalid/blank votes	2,890	0.95		
Total votes	305,306	100.00		
Registered voters/turnout	542,468	56.28		
Source: RTC

== Aftermath ==
Milojko Spajić, the leader of Europe Now!, ruled out a coalition with the DPS and URA. Leader of the Democratic Montenegro, Aleksa Bečić stated that his coalition with the URA, Aleksa and Dritan – Count Bravely!, would be a kingmaker in coalition talks.

On 19 October, after months of negotiations, a coalition agreement was reached between Europe Now!, For the Future of Montenegro, Democratic Montenegro (excluding URA), the Socialist People's Party of Montenegro (as DEMOS was unable to get seats in Parliament), Civis, the Albanian Forum, and the Albanian Alliance. The session to officially install the government was set for the following week. Under the agreement, Spajić will serve as Prime Minister, and Andrija Mandić will become President of Parliament, with For the Future of Montenegro providing a support role until the end of 2024. Europe Now! will have ten ministries aside from the Prime Ministership, Democratic Montenegro will receive the Deputy Prime Minister position and four ministries, the Socialist People's Party two portfolios, the Albanian Forum one vice-presidential post and one ministry, the Albanian Alliance one portfolio, and Civis one vice-presidential post. Beginning in 2025, the government will be reshuffled, and the two parties of For the Future of Montenegro which gained seats in the legislature will be granted one vice-presidential seat each as well as four ministries. The proposed composition of the new government was presented to Parliament on 26 October, and was approved on 31 October.
