= Nik Gjeloshaj =

Montenegrin politician (born 1979)

- Ник Ђелошај
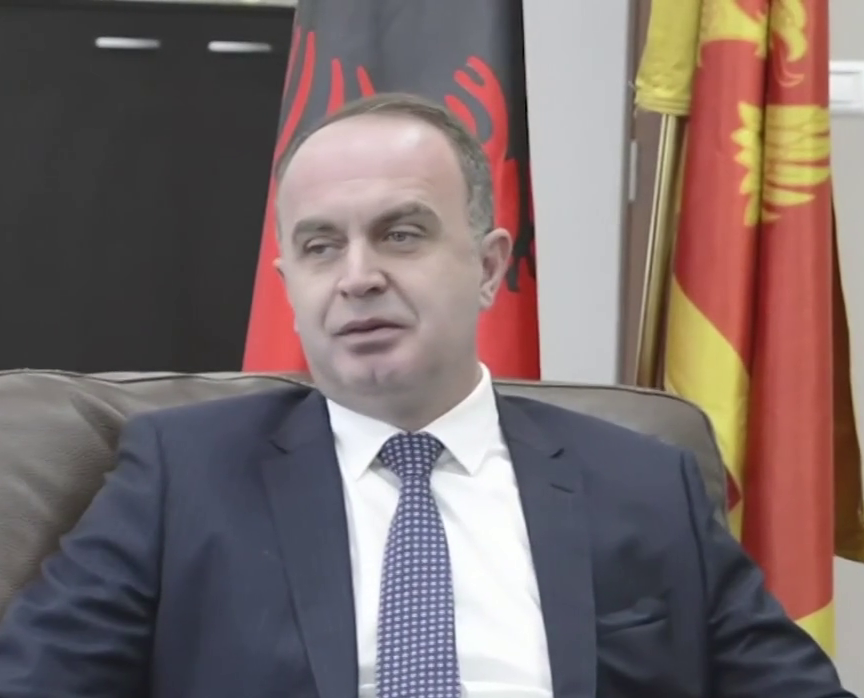
- Gjeloshaj in 2020

Mayor of Tuzi
- Incumbent
- Assumed office 23 March 2019
- Preceded by: Office established

Deputy Prime Minister for Economic Policy and Economic Development
- Incumbent
- Assumed office 23 July 2024

Personal details
- Born: 12 November 1979 (age 46) Tuzi, SR Montenegro, Yugoslavia
- Party: Albanian Alternative
- Occupation: Politician

Nik Gjeloshaj (Cyrillic: Ник Ђелошај; born 12 November 1979) is a Montenegrin politician. He is serving as deputy Prime Minister of Economic Policy and Minister of Economic Development in Montenegro. Previously he has served as the Mayor of Tuzi from 23 March 2019 to November 2023.

== Biography ==
Gjeloshaj is the leader of Albanian Alternative. In the 2020 Montenegrin parliamentary election, he was the ballot carrier of the Albanian List, a minority politics coalition, formed by New Democratic Force (FORCA), the Albanian Alternative (AA), Albanian Coalition Perspective (AKP) and the Democratic League of Albanians (DSA). The new coalition won 1.58% of the vote and gained a singular seat in the Parliament of Montenegro, which belonged to Gjeloshaj.
