= Democratic Party (Montenegro) =

Montenegrin political party

Democratic Party Partia Demokratike Democratska Partija
- Leader: Fatmir Gjeka
- Founded: April 2010
- Split from: UDSH
- Headquarters: Ulcinj
- Ideology: National conservatism Albanian minority interests Pro-Europeanism
- Political position: Centre-right to right-wing
- National affiliation: Albanian Alliance (2023-present)
- Parliament: 0 / 81
- Mayors: 0 / 25
- Local Parliaments: 5 / 844

The Democratic Party (Albanian: Partia Demokratike, Montenegrin: Democratska Partija, abbr. DP/PD) is a conservative Albanian minority interests political party in Montenegro. Since 2012, it has been a member of the Albanian Coalition, which it leads together with the LDMZ.

== History ==
The party was founded in April 2010 in Ulcinj, its founder and current leader is Fatmir Gjeka, former deputy president of the Democratic Union of Albanians (UDSH, prior party split in early 2010) and former Mayor of Ulcinj (2008-2011).

The party was part of the Albanian Coalition since its foundation in 2012. In 2020, the PD agreed to re-join Democratic Union of Albanians, by forming a pre-election coalition for 2020 Montenegrin parliamentary election. The new Albanian Coalition (PD-LDMZ-UDSH) won 1.14% of the vote and gained a singular seat in the Parliament of Montenegro, which belonged to the Democratic Party leader Fatmir Gjeka.

In the 2023 Montenegrin parliamentary election, the PD was part of the Albanian Alliance, which got 1.49% of the votes and 1 seat. The elected member of Parliament belongs to New Democratic Force.

== Electoral performance ==
=== Parliamentary elections ===
Election	Party leader	Performance				Alliance	Government
Election	Party leader	Votes	%	Seats	+/–	Alliance	Government
2012	Predrag Drecun	3,824	1.05%	1 / 81	New	AK	Opposition
2016	Fatmir Gjeka	3,394	0.89%	0 / 81	▼1	AK	Extra-parliamentary
2020	Fatmir Gjeka	6,488	1.58%	1 / 81	▲1	AK	Opposition (2020–2022)
2020	Fatmir Gjeka	6,488	1.58%	1 / 81	▲1	AK	Coalition (2022–2023)
2023	Fatmir Gjeka	4,512	1.49%	0 / 81		AA	Coalition
