= Nazif Cungu =

Montenegrin politician (born 1958)

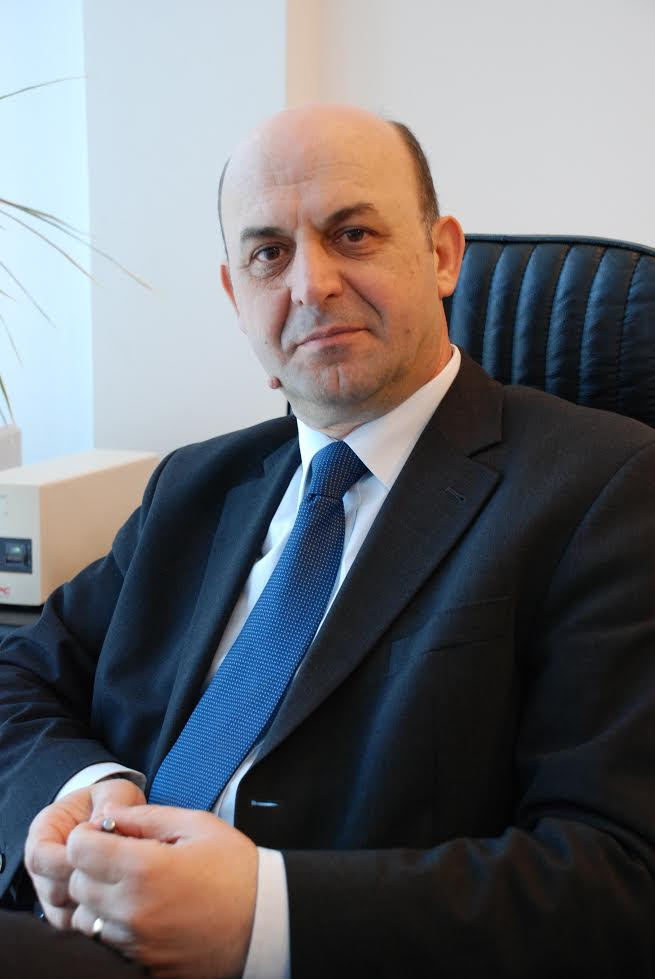

Leader of FORCA
- In office 22 October 2005 – 30 October 2021
- Succeeded by: Genci Nimanbegun

Mayor of Ulcinj
- In office September 2011 – May 2018
- Preceded by: Gëzim Hajdinaga
- Succeeded by: Loro Nrekiq

President of Economical-Social Council of Ulcinj
- In office 2004–2005

President of Counselors Club of DUA
- In office 1996–2002

Personal details
- Born: 13 May 1958 (age 67) Ulcinj, Montenegro, Yugoslavia
- Party: New Democratic Power – FORCA

Nazif Cungu (Montenegrin: Назиф Цунгу, born 13 May 1958) is a Montenegrin politician, the leader of the biggest Albanian political party in Montenegro FORCA.

== Personal history ==
Nazif Cungu was born in Ulcinj, Ulcinj Municipality, southern Montenegro, near the border with Albania to an Albanian family on 13 May 1958. He finished secondary school and gymnasium in his hometown. He studied tourism management in Economic Faculty of Dubrovnik, graduating in 1980. From 1983 until 1987 he worked at the Municipality of Ulcinj in the post of secretary for economy, finance and budget. From 1987 to 1991 he had the post of a Chief Commercial of Tourist Organization "Ulcinj Riviera". From 1993 to 1997 he directed the marketing sector of "Primus" company. In 1997 he founded his own company named "Cungu & Co." which employs over 100 people in its branches located in Ulcinj, Podgorica, Tivat, Budva, Niksic, Bjelopolje, Kotor and Herceg Novi. Cungu has extended its activities to other companies in Tirana and Pristina.

== Public engagement ==
From 1996 to 2002 he was the President of the Club of Counsilors of Democratic Union of Albanians, which resigned due to a disagreement with some action and deviations of the party. In the years 2004 to 2005 has performed the function of President of the Economic and Social Council of Ulcinj. Cungu is one of the founders of the party New Democratic Power – FORCA, and is currently chairman of the party. He is a prominent activist of civil society in Montenegro, he was among the founders of the Association "Ulqini" in Switzerland, humanitarian association "Drita", "Montenegro Business Alliances - MBA" and association of olive growers. Also he is one of the founders and currently chairman of the "Ulcinj Business Association", in which there are over 270 businessmen.

== See also ==
- Mayor of Ulcinj
- New Democratic Power - FORCA

== Notes ==
Political offices
Preceded by Gëzim Hajdinaga	Mayor of Ulcinj; 2011–present	Succeeded by incumbent
