= Albanian Alternative =

Montenegrin political party

Albanian Alternative Alternativa Shqiptare Albanska alternativa
- President: Nik Gjeloshaj
- Founded: 2006
- Dissolved: 2026
- Merged into: Albanian Forum
- Headquarters: Tuzi
- Ideology: Albanian minority interests Pro-Europeanism; Conservatism
- Political position: Center-right
- National affiliation: Albanian Forum
- Slogan: Word above all.
- Parliament: 1 / 81
- Mayors: 1 / 25
- Local Parliaments: 14 / 844

Albanian Alternative (Montenegrin: Albanska alternativa, Albanian: Alternativa Shqiptare) was an political party representing the Albanian minority in Montenegro. In May of 2026, it merged into Albanian Forum.

The party is led by Nik Gjeloshaj. At the legislative elections in Montenegro, in October 2012, AA won 1 out of 81 seats. Between 2009 and 2016, the party was a constituent member of the Albanian Coalition.

== History ==
In September 2016, the Albanian Alternative agreed to form a pre-election alliance with New Democratic Power – FORCA and the Democratic Union of Albanians (DUA) for the 2016 elections. The coalition won one seat in the election, which was allocated to a member of FORCA.

== Electoral performance ==
=== Parliamentary elections ===
Election	Party leader	Performance				Alliance	Government
Election	Party leader	Votes	%	Seats	+/–	Alliance	Government
2006	Vaselj Siništaj	2,656	0.78%	1 / 81	New	—	Opposition
2009	Gjergj Camaj	2,898	0.9%	0 / 81	▼1	AA-DS	Extra-parliamentary
2012	Gjergj Camaj	3,824	1.05%	1 / 81	▲1	AK	Opposition
2016	Nik Gjeloshaj	3,394	0.89%	0 / 81	▼1	AO	Extra-parliamentary
2020	Nik Gjeloshaj	6,488	1.58%	0 / 81	0	AL	Extra-parliamentary
2023	Nik Gjeloshaj	5,767	1.91%	1 / 81	▲1	AF	Government

== See also ==
- Albanians Decisively
