= New Democratic Force (Montenegro) =

Montenegrin political party

New Democratic Force Nova demokratska snaga Forca e Re Demokratike
- Leader: Genci Nimanbegu
- Founder: Nazif Cungu
- Founded: 22 October 2005
- Headquarters: Ulcinj
- Ideology: Albanian minority interests; Conservatism; Pro-Europeanism
- Political position: Centre-right
- National affiliation: Albanian Alliance (2023–present)
- Parliament: 1 / 81
- Mayors: 1 / 25
- Local Parliaments: 5 / 844

New Democratic Force (Montenegrin: Nova demokratska snaga, Albanian: Forca e Re Demokratike) is a political party of the Albanian minority in Montenegro.

The party was founded on 22 October 2005 as a local minority party representing the Albanian population in Ulcinj. Nazif Cungu was elected as its president at the founding assembly. In April 2008, FORCA opened a branch of its party in Tuzi. On the 4th Congress of the party held on October 30, 2021, Genci Nimanbegu was elected as the new leader of the party.

== Electoral performance ==
On last parliamentary elections, on 29 March 2009, Forca has one seat, becoming for the first time a parliamentary party.

In the run-up to the 2008 presidential election, it supported the opposition candidate, Nebojša Medojević.

In the Municipal Parliament of Ulcinj, FORCA has 11 out of 33 seats.

In September 2016, FORCA agreed to form a pre-election alliance with Albanian Alternative (AA) and Democratic Union of Albanians (DUA) for 2016 elections. The coalition won one seat in the election, which was allocated to a member of FORCA.

Prior of the 2020 elections, FORCA continuing close cooperation with the right-wing Albanian Alternative, forming a new coalition under the name Albanian List, coalition was also joined by other minor Albanian parties and movements.

=== Parliamentary elections ===
Election	Party leader	Performance				Alliance	Government
Election	Party leader	Votes	%	Seats	+/–	Alliance	Government
2006	Nazif Cungu	2,197	0.65%	0 / 81	New	—	Extra-parliamentary
2009	Nazif Cungu	2,939	0.89%	1 / 81	▲1	—	Opposition
2012	Nazif Cungu	5,244	1.47%	1 / 81	0	ZJ	Support
2016	Nazif Cungu	4,854	1.27%	1 / 81	0	AO	Support
2020	Nazif Cungu	6,488	1.58%	1 / 81	0	AL	Opposition 2020–22
2020	Nazif Cungu	6,488	1.58%	1 / 81	0	AL	Coalition 2022–23
2023	Genci Nimanbegu	4,512	1.49%	1 / 81	0	AA	Coalition
