= Democratic Union of Albanians =

Democratic Union of Albanians Demokratska unija Albanaca Unioni Demokratik i Shqipëtarëve
- Leader: Mehmet Zenka
- Founded: 21 November 1993
- Headquarters: Ulcinj
- Ideology: Albanian minority interests Atlanticism; Albanian nationalism Social conservatism
- Political position: Right-wing
- Parliament: 1 / 81
- Mayors: 0 / 25
- Local Parliaments: 7 / 844

The Democratic Union of Albanians (Montenegrin: Demokratska unija Albanaca, Albanian: Unioni Demokratik i Shqiptarëve) is a conservative political party of the Albanian minority in Montenegro.

== History ==
The Democratic Union of Albanians was founded in Ulcinj, Republic of Montenegro in November 1993 as part of a split from the Democratic League in Montenegro. Their policy was that they would respect Montenegrin territorial integrity within the Federal Republic of Yugoslavia but would insist on Montenegrin authorities to recognise the Albanian minority as equals. The DUA was the second Albanian minority rights party established in Montenegro after the Democratic League in Montenegro.

The party took part in the campaign prior to Montenegrin independence referendum, promoting Montenegro's independence alongside DPS, SDP, Civic Party and Liberal Party. In the 2006 Montenegrin parliamentary election, the first after Montenegrin independence, the DUA joined the Democratic Party of Socialists of Montenegro (DPS) in a pre-election coalition and went into government, continuing this arrangement for the 2009 Montenegrin parliamentary election. For the 2012 Montenegrin parliamentary election, the DUA opted to campaign independent of the DPS and as a result, lost all of their representatives in the Parliament of Montenegro. In 2016, they announced an election coalition with Forca and Albanian Alternative for the next election but the DUA as a single party did not win any seats while in this coalition. In 2020, they joined with the Democratic Party to form the Albanian Coalition. The DUA's leader Mehmet Zenka was elected and was appointed as the Montenegrin Minister of Human and Minority Rights in the coalition government. In the 2023 Montenegrin parliamentary election, Zenka retained his seat for the DUA and became part of six Albanian representatives in the Montenegrin Parliament.

=== Opposition to LGBT rights ===
The party's former leader, Ferhat Dinosha, was known for being against same-sex marriage in Montenegro, famously quoting that "the Albanian zone in Montenegro was free from homosexuals", and that "if there were any homosexuals in Montenegro, that this would be bad for the country".
