= 2022 Montenegrin crisis =

Political crisis in Montenegro

2022 Montenegrin pro-government protests
- Date: 18 January – 28 April 2022
- Location: Montenegro
- Caused by: Political crisis in Montenegro caused in the wake of the Montenegrin nationalist protests and 2021 Montenegrin episcopal enthronement protests; Parliamentary blockade since June 2021; Discord among the political parties forming the parliamentary majority; Stagnation of the European integration processes; Proposal of a new minority government by the Deputy Prime Minister Dritan Abazović of United Reform Action
- Goals: Prevention of the formation of the minority government; Resignation of the Deputy Prime Minister; Early parliamentary elections
- Methods: Protest marches, civil disobedience
- Result: Prime Minister Zdravko Krivokapić commences the process of dismissal of Deputy Prime Minister Dritan Abazović which ultimately fails to pass.; Prime Minister Zdravko Krivokapić sends a proposal to the Parliament of Montenegro suggesting shortening the mandate of the current assembly, as well as early parliamentary elections, which failed to pass.; Motion of no-confidence vote against the Government of Montenegro passed.; President of the Parliament Aleksa Bečić dismissed.; Dritan Abazović was elected as Prime Minister of Montenegro

Parties
Government: Prime Minister of Montenegro; Ministry of Defense; Ministry of Education, Science, Culture and Sports; Ministry of Finance and Social Welfare; Ministry of Economy; Ministry of Urbanism; Ministry of Agriculture; Ministry of Health; Political parties involved: Ne damo Crnu Goru; Democratic Montenegro; True Montenegro; United Montenegro	Minority government proponents: Deputy Prime Minister of Montenegro; Ministry of Foreign Affairs; Ministry of Internal Affairs; Ministry of Capital Investments; Political parties involved: United Reform Action; Bosniak Party; Democratic Party; Civis; New Democratic Force; Supporting political parties: Democratic Party of Socialists; Social Democrats; Social Democratic Party; Liberal Party; Socialist People's Party of Montenegro (limited); Other minority parties

Lead figures
Zdravko Krivokapić; Milojko Spajić; Jakov Milatović; Ratko Mitrović; Jelena Borovinić-Bojović; Olivera Injac; Aleksandar Stijović; Vesna Bratić Aleksa Bečić; Marko Milačić	Dritan Abazović; Đorđe Radulović; Sergej Sekulović; Mladen Bojanić Ervin Ibrahimović; Genci Nimanbegu; Fatmir Gjeka; Vladimir Joković; Nik Gjeloshaj; Srđan Pavićević

On January 17, 2022, the smallest of three ruling constituents in the Parliament of Montenegro, United Reform Action, proposed a potential solution in the form of a minority government, as an answer to the political crisis that has been plaguing the country since the summer of 2021, when the largest ruling constituent, the Democratic Front stepped out, putting the parliament into an effective blockade. The proposed minority government would consist of the United Reform Action, Civis, Socialist People's Party of Montenegro, Bosniak Party, Democratic Party, New Democratic Force, and Albanian Alternative. Even though the parties mentioned have 14 seats in the parliament, Dritan Abazović, the Deputy Prime Minister of Montenegro and the president of the United Reform Action, stated that he expects the support of either the opposition or the ruling parties, or ideally both, and has invited all 81 MPs of the Montenegrin parliament to support the initiative.

Almost immediately after the proposal was made, it was heavily criticized by the Democrats, one of the ruling three constituents of the parliamentary majority, who stated that it is a "pact with the DPS and their former allies, citing the ethnic minority parties. Soon after, the Prime Minister of Montenegro made a proclamation stating that the minority government is a "betrayal". Both subjects accused Dritan Abazović of "betraying the will of the people" as well as of political corruption, and undermining the results of the last parliamentary election.

The proposal caused mixed reactions in the Montenegrin public, some condemning it, while some supporting it. Since January 18, there have been daily protests throughout various towns in Montenegro, against the formation of the minority government and in support of the Krivokapić Cabinet. So far, the protests have been held in Podgorica, Nikšić, Pljevlja, Bijelo Polje, Berane, and Budva. The protest in Podgorica, held on 23 January 2022, was even attended by some of the ministers supporting Krivokapić.

The proposal for the dismissal of the Deputy Prime Minister of Montenegro, Dritan Abazović, which was to be voted on February 3, 2022, failed to pass, as only 20 MPs voted for, 11 against, while 46 abstained from voting altogether, and 4 were absent.

The second proposal, for shortening the term of the current parliamentary assembly, which was supposed be discussed on February 4, 2022, also did not pass, as the majority of the MPs didn't approve of the piece of the daily agenda pertaining to it. The motion of no-confidence towards the cabinet of Zdravko Krivokapić, which was discussed later that same day, had passed, it becoming the first government in the history of Montenegro to lose a no-confidence vote in the parliament. 43 MPs voted for the no-confidence vote, 11 MPs voted against. The other 27 MPs, composed of the Democratic Front, Socialist People's Party of Montenegro and DEMOS left the parliament shortly before the vote was conducted.

On 7 February 2022, the bid for the dismissal President of the Parliament of Montenegro, Aleksa Bečić, passed, with 43 votes in favor, 36 against, and two absentees. Henceforth, Strahinja Bulajić, one of the Deputy Presidents of the Parliament was named the acting President of the Parliament until a new one is elected.

On 28 April 2022, the installment of a new cabinet led by Dritan Abazović, passed with 45 votes in favour, 0 against and 36 absentees. Henceforth, Dritan Abazović was elected as the new Prime Minister. On the same day, Danijela Đurović was elected as the new President of the Parliament of Montenegro

== See also ==
- 2019 Montenegrin anti-corruption protests
- 2019–2020 clerical protests in Montenegro
- Montenegrin nationalist protests (2020–present)
- 2021 Montenegrin episcopal enthronement protests
