= Parliament of Montenegro, 2020–2024 =

2020-2023 Parliament of Montenegro
←	2016–2020	2023–2027	→
- Seat composition of the Parliament of Montenegro

Overview
- Legislative body: Parliament of Montenegro
- Jurisdiction: Montenegro
- Meeting place: House of the Assembly, Boulevard of Saint Peter of Cetinje, Podgorica
- Term: 23 September 2020 – 16 March 2023
- Election: 30 August 2020
- Government: 2020-2022: NDCG-CnB; 2022-2023: SNP-CnB-SDP-BS-LSh-KSh-HGI
- Opposition: 2020-2022: DPS-BS-SD-SDP-LP; 2022-2023: DF-MNN-SD-DS-SDU-Prava-UCG: 2022. since September; DPS-BS-SD-SDP-LP
- Website: skupstina.me
- Members: 81
- President: 2020-2022: Aleksa Bečić (MNN); 2022-2023: Danijela Đurović (SNP)
- Party control: 2020-2022: DF-MNN-SNP-DS-SDU-CnB-Prava majority 2022-2023: DPS-SNP-CnB-BS-SDP-LP-FORCA-UDSH majority: 2022. Since September: DF-MNN-SNP-CnB-DS-SDU-Prava

2020-2023 Parliament of Montenegro was convocation of the Parliament of Montenegro, elected in the 2020 parliamentary election.

== History ==
The first session of Parliament was held on 23 September 2020. The leader of Democratic Montenegro, Aleksa Bečić, was elected president. A parliamentary majority was also formed, consisting of coalitions of the ZBCG, MjNN and CnB. This is the first majority since independence that does not include the Democratic Party of Socialists. Montenegrin President Milo Đukanović was not present at the session.

All 41 opposition deputies nominated Zdravko Krivokapić as their candidate for the post of prime minister. After negotiations, Krivokapić Cabinet took office on 4 December 2020.

The government fell in a vote of no confidence on 4 February 2022, initiated by URA leader Dritan Abazović. On 28 April 2022, after parliamentary and government crisis, Parliament approved the Abazović Cabinet. A new parliament speaker, Danijela Đurović from the Socialist People's Party, was also elected.

On 20 August 2022, the Parliament of Montenegro passed a motion of no confidence against Abazović's government, which ended his premiership.

== Current composition ==
Deputy	Party	Group	Birth year	Notes
Danijel Živković	DPS	Democratic Party of Socialists	1987	Head of MP group
Duško Marković	DPS	Democratic Party of Socialists	1958	
Branimir Gvozdenović	DPS	Democratic Party of Socialists	1961	
Aleksandra Vuković	DPS	Democratic Party of Socialists	1981	
Mevludin Nuhodžić	DPS	Democratic Party of Socialists	1959	
Predrag Bošković	DPS	Democratic Party of Socialists	1972	
Jevto Eraković	DPS	Democratic Party of Socialists	1976	
Nikola Rakočević	DPS	Democratic Party of Socialists	1989	
Dragica Sekulić	DPS	Democratic Party of Socialists	1980	
Petar Ivanović	DPS	Democratic Party of Socialists	1965	
Halil Duković	DPS	Democratic Party of Socialists	1964	
Dragutin Papović	DPS	Democratic Party of Socialists	1980	
Vesna Pavićević	DPS	Democratic Party of Socialists	1962	
Miloš Nikolić	DPS	Democratic Party of Socialists	1994	
Nikola Janović	DPS	Democratic Party of Socialists	1980	
Daliborka Pejović	DPS	Democratic Party of Socialists	1971	
Branko Čavor	DPS	Democratic Party of Socialists	1955	
Suzana Pribilović	DPS	Democratic Party of Socialists	1972	
Ivan Mitrović	DPS	Democratic Party of Socialists	1981	
Abaz Dizdarević	DPS	Democratic Party of Socialists	1978	
Luiđ Škrelja	DPS	Democratic Party of Socialists	1955	
Jovanka Laličić	DPS	Democratic Party of Socialists	1957	
Predrag Sekulić	DPS	Democratic Party of Socialists	1964	
Andrija Nikolić	DPS	Democratic Party of Socialists	1985	
Lidija Kljajić	DPS	Democratic Party of Socialists	1975	
Miomir M. Mugoša	DPS	Democratic Party of Socialists	1968	
Nela Savković-Vukčević	DPS	Democratic Party of Socialists	1972	
Mihailo Anđušić	DPS	Democratic Party of Socialists	1987	
Radule Novović	DPS	Democratic Party of Socialists	1971	
Slaven Radunović	NSD	Democratic Front – NSD, DNP, RP	1964	Head of MP group
Simonida Kordić	NSD	Democratic Front – NSD, DNP, RP	1969	
Janko Milatović	NSD	Democratic Front – NSD, DNP, RP		
Jovan Jole Vučurović	NSD	Democratic Front – NSD, DNP, RP	1973	
Jelena Božović	NSD	Democratic Front – NSD, DNP, RP	1985	
Budimir Aleksić	NSD	Democratic Front – NSD, DNP, RP	1968	
Andrija Mandić	NSD	Democratic Front – NSD, DNP, RP	1965	
Milan Knežević	DNP	Democratic Front – NSD, DNP, RP	1980	
Milun Zogović	DNP	Democratic Front – NSD, DNP, RP	1979	
Predrag Bulatović	DNP	Democratic Front – NSD, DNP, RP	1956	
Maja Vukićević	DNP	Democratic Front – NSD, DNP, RP		
Dragan Bojović	DNP	Democratic Front – NSD, DNP, RP	1973	
Maksim Vučinić	RP	Democratic Front – NSD, DNP, RP	1994	
Dejan Đurović	NSD	Democratic Front – NSD, DNP, RP	1966	
Nataša Jevrić	NSD	Democratic Front – NSD, DNP, RP	1965	
Boris Bogdanović	Democrats	Democrats – Demos – Peace is Our Nation		Head of MP group
Aleksa Bečić	Democrats	Democrats – Demos – Peace is Our Nation	1987	
Miodrag Lekić	DEMOS	Democrats – Demos – Peace is Our Nation	1947	
Zdenka Popović	Democrats	Democrats – Demos – Peace is Our Nation		
Dragan Krapović	Democrats	Democrats – Demos – Peace is Our Nation	1976	
Momo Koprivica	Democrats	Democrats – Demos – Peace is Our Nation		
Tamara Vujović	Democrats	Democrats – Demos – Peace is Our Nation	1975	
Albin Ćeman	Democrats	Democrats – Demos – Peace is Our Nation		
Vladimir Martinović	Democrats	Democrats – Demos – Peace is Our Nation		
Danilo Šaranović	Democrats	Democrats – Demos – Peace is Our Nation		
Branko Radulović	PzP	Democratic Front – Movement for Changes	1950	Head of MP group
Branka Bošnjak	PzP	Democratic Front – Movement for Changes	1970	
Vladan Raičević	PzP	Democratic Front – Movement for Changes	1980	
Jovanka Bogavac	PzP	Democratic Front – Movement for Changes	1971	
Nikola Bajčetić	PzP	Democratic Front – Movement for Changes	1991	
Dragan Ivanović	SNP	Socialist People's Party of Montenegro	1953	Head of MP group
Danijela Đurović	SNP	Socialist People's Party of Montenegro	1973	President of the Parliament
Dragan Vukić	SNP	Socialist People's Party of Montenegro	1987	
Milosava Paunović	SNP	Socialist People's Party of Montenegro	1981	
Bogdan Božović	SNP	Socialist People's Party of Montenegro		
Miloš Konatar	URA	In Black and White	1983	Head of MP group
Božena Jelušić	URA	In Black and White	1956	
Srđan Pavičević	Civis	In Black and White	1961	
Suada Zoronjić	URA	In Black and White	1971	
Kenana Strujić-Harbić	BS	Bosniak Party	1980	Head of MP group
Amer Smailović	BS	Bosniak Party	1991	
Suljo Mustafić	BS	Bosniak Party	1973	
Ivan Brajović	SD	Social Democrats of Montenegro	1962	Head of MP group
Damir Šehović	SD	Social Democrats of Montenegro	1981	
Boris Mugoša	SD	Social Democrats of Montenegro	1979	
Draginja Vuksanović	SDP	Social Democratic Party – Liberal Party	1978	Head of MP group
Andrija Popović	LP	Social Democratic Party – Liberal Party	1959	Deputy head of MP group
Adnan Striković	SDP	Social Democratic Party – Liberal Party	1979	
Genci Nimanbegu	FORCA	Albanian MPs Group	1961	
Mehmed Zenka	UDSh	Albanian MPs Group		
Marko Milačić	Prava	Unaffiliated	1985	
Vladimir Dobričanin	UCG	Unaffiliated	1972	
