= Montenegrin nationalist protests (2020–2022) =

Series of protests in Montenegro

2020–2022 Montenegrin Anti-Government protests
- Part of 2022 Montenegrin crisis
- Date: 5 September 2020 – 4 February 2022
- Location: Montenegro
- Caused by: Proposal of the new citizenship law; Dissatisfaction with the government; Accusations for census manipulation; Selective justice; Denial of Srebrenica Genocide; Attempts to disband Faculty of Montenegrin language and literature; Lack of transparency; Political revanchism and nepotism; Government mishandling of the COVID-19 pandemic; Serbian Orthodox Church influence on the Government
- Goals: Prevention of the adoption of the new citizenship law; Resignation of the government; Relocation of the enthronement ceremony for Joanikije II from Cetinje elsewhere.
- Methods: Motorcades, Protest marches, road block protests, civil disobedience
- Result: The majority of MPs in the Parliament voted in favor of adopting the Resolution of Srebrenica Genocide; Vladimir Leposavić dismissed from the post of Minister of Justice and Human and Minority Rights; Government and Political crisis; Interpellation for dismissal of 3 additional ministers passed in the Parliament; Government of Zdravko Krivokapić voted out in a no-confidence vote

Parties
Anti-government protesters: Montenegrin nationalists; Sovereignists; Civic Initiative 21 May; NGO "Montenegrin Spring 2021"; Opposition parties involved: Patriotic Komitas Union of Montenegro; Liberal Party; Supporting opposition parties: Democratic Party of Socialists; Social Democrats; Social Democratic Party; Bosniak Party; New Left; Other minority parties	Government: Law enforcement; Ministry of Internal Affairs; Government parties: Democratic Front; Democratic Montenegro; Socialist People's Party; United Reform Action; True Montenegro

Lead figures
Tatjana Knežević-Perišić; Andrija Popović; Miodrag Živković	Zdravko Krivokapić; Dritan Abazović; Sergej Sekulović; Zoran Brđanin

In April 2021, a wave of protests, dubbed by its organizers as the Montenegrin Spring, or the Montenegrin Response or Montenegrin Answer, was launched in Montenegro against the announced adoption of regulations that will make it easier to acquire Montenegrin citizenship, but also take away the citizenship of some Montenegrin emigrants, which the protesters consider as an "attempt of the government to change the ethnic structure of Montenegro" and against the Krivokapić Cabinet, which the protesters accuse of being "treacherous" and the "satellite of Serbia".

== Background ==
=== Late 2020 protests ===
After the fall of the DPS cabinet from the position of power it had held in previous years, in the aftermath of the clerical protests and the 2020 parliamentary election, numerous Montenegrin nationalist political subjects organized mass rallies in Cetinje and in the capital Podgorica, in support of DPS, due to what they perceived as a "threat to Montenegrin statehood and independence". The rallies were marked by inappropriate messages to leaders and members of some parties of the new majority, who were labeled as "traitors" and "chetnik scoundrels". The use of Montenegrin nationalist rhetoric was criticized by other sectors of Montenegrin society. On 4 December 2020, the Krivokapić Cabinet, led by Zdravko Krivokapić was formed, and already in the same month, the government announced the removal of the controversial points from the religious properties law, sparking a new protest.

=== Nationality law ===
The current Montenegrin nationality law is very strict and prohibits dual citizenship except in some special situations. In addition, it is necessary to reside continuously in Montenegro for ten years in order to apply for citizenship. Many citizens who came as refugees 30 years ago still don't have the issue of citizenship resolved. Most MPs of the previous opposition parties (at that time, part of the coalition government) assessed the law as "rigid and discriminatory", especially towards Serbs, because by law they cannot obtain Montenegrin citizenship if they are citizens of Serbia. 63,746 foreigners live in Montenegro, which is about ten percent of the total population. Of these, 30,930 were granted the status of foreigners with permanent residence because they have lived there for years and are potential winners of citizenship, while 32,816 people have been granted temporary residence in Montenegro.

In March 2021, the government announced adoption of regulations that would make it easier to acquire Montenegrin citizenship. The government claimed that it only corrected the injustices of the former government towards citizens who could not obtain Montenegrin citizenship because they were "politically ineligible". They also argued they would finally sort out the voters list, which has been the target of criticism for years, and remove from the list the Montenegrin citizens who have lived permanently in other countries for decades, while they retain the right to vote on temporary work. As a response, the opposition claims that it was tantamount to the "Serbianisation of Montenegro", because the liberalization of citizenship, as they claim, would soon give citizenships to tens of thousands of people from Serbia, Bosnia and Herzegovina and Russia, while many Montenegrin emigrants would lose their voting rights.

== Protests ==
On 8 April 2021, protests and "car protests" were held in multiple Montenegrin cities. Along with Montenegrin flags and other national symbols, those gathered chanted, "It's not our government!", "We will defend Montenegro from enemies these days!" "This is not Serbia", "Kosovo is next to Serbia" with insulting messages sent to the government ministers.

=== Bogetići blockade ===
At the exit from Nikšić, the main road to Podgorica was blocked, because a group of demonstrators was stopped by the police. On that occasion, there was an incident in which a government vehicle also participated. Two protesters climbed on the hood of the vehicle, not allowing him to pass. However, the driver of the official vehicle started and both protesters fell on the asphalt. Later, it was announced that a passenger in the car was the daughter of the Prime Minister Zdravko Krivokapić, who responded to this incident by calling an incident an "attack on a government vehicle", stating that will not allow "savagery and lawlessness", as well as accusing President Milo Đukanović as the main culprit of the protests and tensions. At the same location, protesters attacked and injured two members of the Montenegrin army who provoked protestors by showing Serbian three-finger salute.

The protesters blocked the Podgorica–Nikšić road again on 9 and 10 April, for which the Nikšić police prosecuted two people, and filed misdemeanor charges against nine other people. On 11 April, around ten protests attacked and beat up a bystander in Berane.

On 9 May, the incident in Bogetići received its first epilogue - the Department for Internal Control of Police Work determined that there was a grounded suspicion that a police officer from the Nikšić Police Station, SG and an officer of the Police Administration (UP) - the driver of the protected person Dražen Jeknić acted unprofessionally while securing the route and driving the Government car in which the daughter of Prime Minister Zdravko Krivokapić was.

The total roadblock of Podgorica-Niksic road was temporarily dismissed after days of protests, after the controversial bylaws were removed from the Government sessions.

=== May 2021 ===
In period between September 2020 and end of April 2021, 152 pro-Montenegrin gatherings and protests were registered by the Ministry of Interior Affairs, which involved 130,000 people (21% of Montenegro's population). The 15th anniversary of Montenegrin independence was organized by the citizens' initiative in Ivanova Korita locality, Mount Lovcen National Park. It gathered together 65,000 people, which represents over 10% of the country's population. The same day the biggest Montenegrin flag was revealed (5000 m^{2} in size).

=== June 2021 ===
The protests took an unexpected turn and their character transformed from nationalist to anti-fascist, following an incident that took place in Nikšić in the evening of 12 June 2021. when an older man urinated on the statue of the national hero Ljubo Čupić on the central square of the city, in front of many passers-by. The incident caused a public outrage and was condemned by most of the major political parties, the president of the country, and the president of the parliament, as well as partially condemned by the mayor of Nikšić and the prime minister. In the following days, protests were held in Nikšić at the place of the incident, as well as in Cetinje and Podgorica. These were organized mainly by SUBNOR, but also the former protesters who participated in the previous wave of said protests.

=== July 2021 ===
Several protests occurred in Montenegro triggered by Vesna Bratić's mass dismissal of all elementary and high school principals by decree and appointment of personnel associated with the clerical protest of 2020.

=== Protests against enthronement of Metropolitan Joanikije Mićović in Cetinje ===
The civil unrest was refueled in early August 2021, after prime minister Zdravko Krivokapić formally announced that the solemn enthronement (installment) of the new Metropolitan of Montenegro and the Littoral (Serbian Orthodox Church), Joanikije Mićović would be held in the Cetinje Monastery on 4 September 2021 (later postponed to September 5th). Fearing for the security of the future Metropolitan and the country as a whole, some politicians began to question the location of the enthronement ceremony, with some proposing that it should be held in the Cathedral of the Resurrection of Christ, Podgorica.

The residents of Cetinje, a pro-Montenegrin historical capital of the country, began holding protests and rallies against the enthronement of Joanikije in Cetinje branding it an "act of occupation" as well as in support of the Montenegrin Orthodox Church; the rallies were attended by senior representatives of the DPS and other political forces.

Protests began on 4 September with predominantly Montenegrin nationalist protesters setting up barricades at the town's entrance in order to prevent the Patriarch and Metropolitan from reaching the monastery. President Milo Đukanović came to Cetinje to show support for the protest together with his opposition DPS members, calling on the government to cancel the enthronement ceremony, warning that it could trigger violence.

On 5 September, both the Metropolitan and the Serbian Patriarch Porfirije were flown to Cetinje by helicopter and then led into the monastery by heavily armed riot police holding bulletproof vests over their bodies to protect them, as riot police used tear gas to disperse protesters who hurled rocks and bottles at them and fired guns into the air. No fewer than 20 people were injured and police arrested more than a dozen people, including the security advisor to President Milo Đukanović, Veselin Veljović for an attack on police. President Đukanović, who had recommended that the inauguration of Joanikije be held in a place other than in Cetinje, and encouraged protesters to disrupt his inauguration, said that the enthronement was the government's Pyrrhic victory and "a great embarrassment of the Serbian Church and the government of Montenegro", while prime minister Zdravko Krivokapić called the violence in Cetinje "attempted acts of terrorism" on the part of the president's activists. Serbia's president Aleksandar Vučić praised the Montenegrin government's action to secure the ceremony in Cetinje.

== Diaspora reaction ==
=== Diaspora associations and individuals ===
The nationality law change attempt provoked a strong reactions by members of the Montenegrin diaspora. The Union of Swiss Montenegrins sent a protest letter to Krivokapic's cabinet and called on boycott of diplomatic representatives. They also called a hold on dotations and aid by the diaspora to Montenegro, which is estimated to be 0.9 billion euros. Forty-six associations of Montenegrins from 18 countries from Europe, Oceania, North and South America signed a common declaration which condemned what they called a "[p]erfidious attempt to change the ethnic and political map of Montenegro".

On 10 May, 50 Montenegrin Diaspora Organizations, Associations and prominent individuals submitted an appeal letter to Oana Cristina Popa, EU Delegation representative to Montenegro, asking for assistance and support for "constitutionally and legally guaranteed civil rights and freedoms".

=== Protests outside Montenegro ===
On 1 May, Montenegrin emigrants organized a motorcade through downtown Chicago, as a sign of support for patriotic rallies in Montenegro.

In Luxembourg, Montenegrin expats organized a rally and motorcade to commemorate the Independence Day of Montenegro and also to raise awareness on recent Nationality Law developments. Around 7000 expats and emigrants from Montenegro live in Luxembourg. A patriotic motorcade was held in New York City on 27 June 2021, organized by Diaspora, where Montenegrin Americans expressed their support for "progressive forces that defend the fundamental values of civil, secular and anti-fascist Montenegro".
