= 2021 Montenegrin episcopal enthronement protests =

Religious protests in Montenegro

- Part of Montenegrin nationalist protests
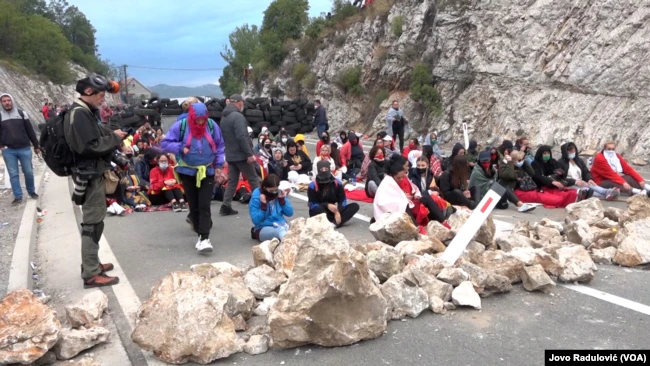
- Protesters blocking the road on 5 September 2021
- Date: 4–5 September 2021 (1 day)
- Location: Cetinje, Montenegro
- Caused by: Opposition to the enthronement of Metropolitan Joanikije II in Cetinje Monastery as the Metropolitan of Montenegro and the Littoral; Opposition to the Serbian Orthodox Church (SPC)
- Goals: Relocation of the enthronement
- Methods: Protests, riots, barricades, civil disobedience
- Result: Serbian Orthodox Church and government′s victory; Enthronement held in Cetinje Monastery, albeit in a controversial manner; Political crisis and crisis within the Krivokapić government, which ultimately resulted in its downfall in February 2022.

Parties
Montenegrin Nationalists Opposition parties: Democratic Party of Socialists; Social Democratic Party; Social Democrats; Patriotic Komitas Union	Government of Montenegro: Law enforcement; Ministry of Defence; Serbian Orthodox Church Supporting parties: Democratic Front; Democratic Montenegro; Socialist People's Party; United Reform Action; True Montenegro; United Montenegro; DEMOS; Workers' Party; Civis; Democratic Serb Party; Democratic Party; Social Democratic Union

Lead figures
Milo Đukanović; Veselin Veljović	Zdravko Krivokapić; Dritan Abazović; Joanikije Mićović; Aleksa Bečić; Aleksandar Vučić; Ivica Dačić; Milorad Dodik; Vojislav Šešelj

A series of violent protests against the enthronement of Joanikije Mićović of the Serbian Orthodox Church as the Metropolitan of Montenegro and the Littoral took place at the historic Cetinje Monastery in September 2021.

The protests in Cetinje, supported by president of Montenegro Milo Đukanović, followed the unresolved issues over which the previous clerical protests (2019–2020) and the contemporaneous nationalist protests had been held. The protesters were overcome by the police that fired rubber bullets, tear gas and detonated shock bombs, while the enthronement presided over by Serbian Patriarch Porfirije Perić was held without the previously planned gathering of the faithful. Mićović and Perić were transported towards the monastery by helicopter and were then surrounded by armed men and shielded with bullet-proof blankets, an operation executed by a special police unit on the insistence of prime minister Zdravko Krivokapić.

Dozens of injuries were reported. Following the enthronement, by mid-September 2021, divisions within the Krivokapić Cabinet led some of the ruling coalition members such as the Democratic Front and Democratic Montenegro to demand that the government be reconstructed or a snap election be held.

== Background ==
=== Domestic political context ===
A large two-sided rift had occurred in Montenegrin politics since the political crisis of 2015–2016. In late December 2019, there began a wave of mass rallies and protests under the guise of liturgical processions headed by Amfilohije Radović, the seniormost prelate of the Serbian Orthodox Church in Montenegro, against the proposed controversial "Law on Freedom of Religion or Belief and the Legal Status of Religious Communities", which would effectively transfer ownership of ecclesiastical buildings and estates in possession of the Serbian Orthodox Church built before 1918 from the Serbian Orthodox Church to the Montenegrin state.

Largely due to the Serbian Orthodox Church's political activism, the DPS rule in Montenegro that had begun in 1991, ended following the opposition parties victory in the parliamentary election in August 2020. The new ruling coalition led by the Democratic Front subsequently removed controversial parts of the law.

The newly formed technocratic government had been accused by its critics of being "treacherous" and pro-Serbian.

=== Geopolitical context ===
Montenegrin president Milo Đukanović had previously accused the Serbian Orthodox Church of promoting pro-Serb policies that are aimed at undermining Montenegrin statehood.

While Montenegro–Serbia relations had been traditionally good since Montenegro's independence in 2006 and there had been a long-standing unionist movement, relations deteriorated significantly since Montenegro's recognition of Kosovan independence in 2008.

=== Orthodox Church in Montenegro ===
Following the establishment of the Kingdom of Serbs, Croats and Slovenes in 1918, the Metropolitanate of Montenegro and the Littoral, along with other the Patriarchate of Karlovci and some other dioceses, was merged with the Metropolitanate of Belgrade to form the Serbian Orthodox Church. Currently, the Metropolitanate of Montenegro and the Littoral is one several dioceses of the Serbian Orthodox Church in Montenegro, whose ruling bishop is the most senior cleric of the Serbian Orthodox Church in Montenegro.

There had been a longstanding unresolved dispute between the Serbian Orthodox Church, which had never applied for registration with the state, and the ecclesiastically unrecognised Montenegrin Orthodox Church established in 1993, as both ecclesiastic entities lay claim to the country's many Orthodox religious sites and dispute each other's legitimacy. The Churches disputed over control of the 750 Orthodox religious sites in the country. Both groups claim to be the "true" Orthodox Church of Montenegro, and hold religious ceremonies separately. Police forces had provided security for such events.

Following the parliamentary election in August 2020 that was won by parties backed by the Serbian Orthodox Church, the Church's influence on social and political developments in Montenegro rose sharply.

== Events ==
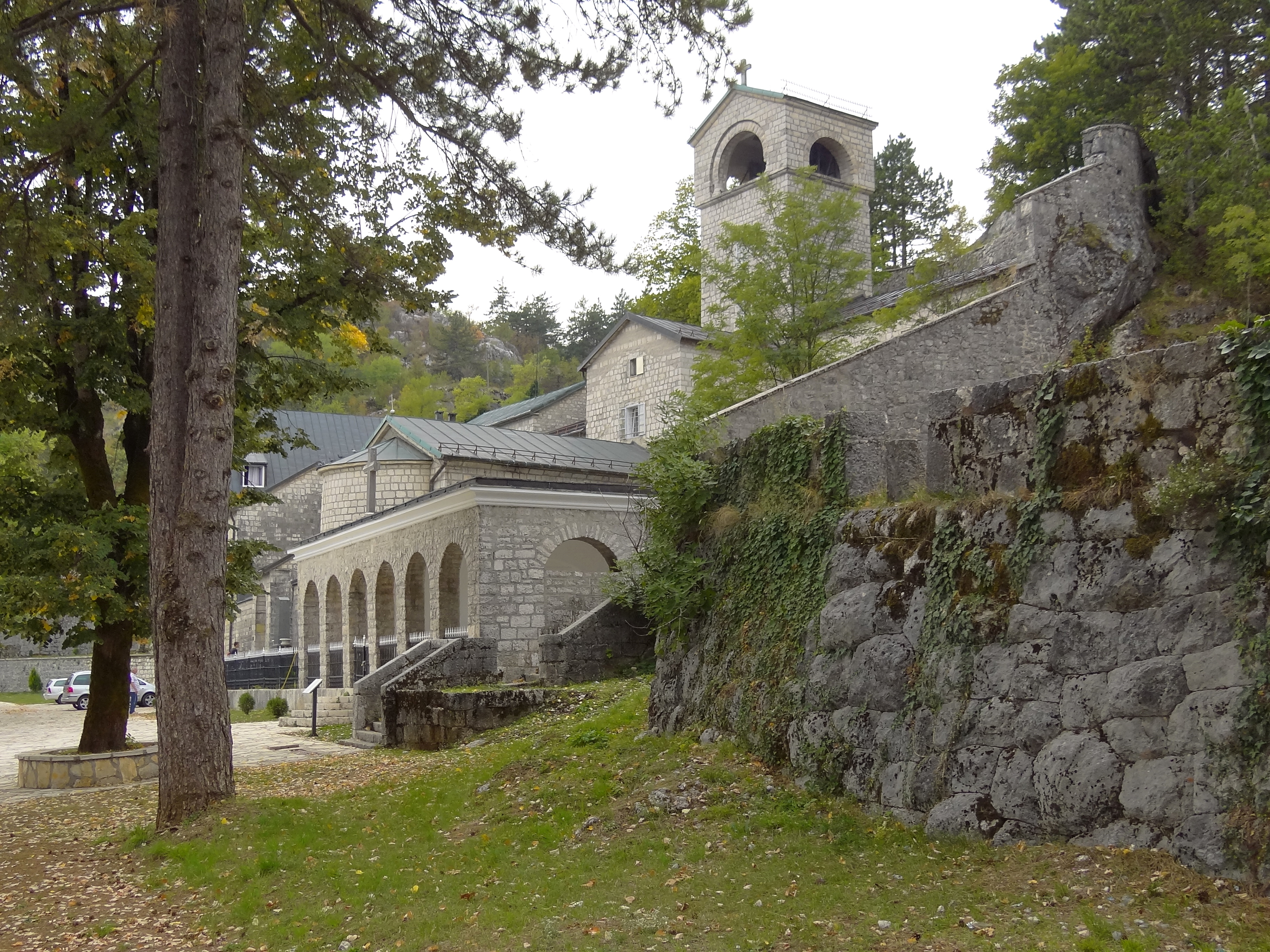
Cetinje Monastery

The death of Amfilohije Radović in October 2020 meant that the seat of the leading Serbian Orthodox cleric in Montenegro remained vacant until the Bishops' Council of the Serbian Orthodox Church elected a new head of the diocese, with Bishop Joanikije acting as administrator of the Metropolitanate. On 29 May 2021, the Bishops' Council held in the Belgrade Church of Saint Sava elected Joanikije as the Metropolitanate of Montenegro and the Littoral, with the seat in Cetinje Monastery.

600 people signed a petition submitted to the Cetinje town assembly on 6 July 2021 that requested "the return of the Cetinje Monastery to the Montenegrin Orthodox Church". In early August 2021, prime minister Zdravko Krivokapić formally announced that the official enthronement of the new Joanikije Mićović would be held in Cetinje Monastery on 4 September 2021 (later postponed to 5 September). Fearing for the security of the future Metropolitan and the country as a whole, some politicians began to question the location of the enthronement ceremony, with some proposing that it should be held in the Cathedral of the Resurrection of Christ, Podgorica.

Some residents of Cetinje, which had served as Montenegro's capital before 1918, began holding protests and rallies against the enthronement of Joanikije and in support of the Montenegrin Orthodox Church; the rallies were attended by senior representatives of the DPS and other political figures. As pressure built on the Church hierarchy to relocate the enthronement, in a bid to reduce the risks, in late August the Metropolitanate, while confirming the ceremony would take place in Cetinje on 5 September, opted for downgrading the overall scale of the event by abandoning a plan for a mass gathering of the faithful and political leaders in front of the monastery.

Violent protests began on 4 September with predominantly Montenegrin nationalist protesters setting up barricades at the town′s entrance in order to prevent the Patriarch and Metropolitan from reaching the monastery.

On 5 September 2021, Joanikije Mićović was enthroned in the Cetinje Monastery by Patriarch Porfirije. Both the Metropolitan and the Patriarch were flown to Cetinje by helicopter and then led into the monastery by heavily armed riot police holding bulletproof vests over their bodies to protect them, as riot police used tear gas, fired guns into the air, and detonated shock bombs to disperse protesters and remove the barricades blocking the roads.

No fewer than 20 people were injured and police arrested more than a dozen people, including the security advisor to President Milo Đukanović, Veselin Veljović.

President Đukanović, who had recommended that the inauguration of Joanikije be held in a place other than Cetinje, and encouraged protesters to disrupt his inauguration, said that the enthronement was the government′s pyrrhic victory and "a great embarrassment of the Serbian Church and the government of Montenegro", while prime minister Zdravko Krivokapić called the violence in Cetinje "attempted acts of terrorism" on the part of the president′s activists.

== Analysis, reactions, and aftermath ==
=== Immediate reactions and analysis ===
Following the enthronement on 5 September 2021, the Croatian daily Jutarnji list and Al Jazeera Balkans cited Montenegrin observers and one Serbian observer who opined that the enthronement of Joanikije in Cetinje exposed the Serbian Church as an instrument in the attempts undertaken by Belgrade and Moscow to absorb Montenegro into "Greater Serbia", with Montenegrin political scientist Šeki Radončić positing that it was a continuation of their bid to undermine and depose president Đukanović. Snježana Pavić of Jutarnji list made a conclusion that the enthronement was "proof that pro-Serbian forces, which negate Montenegro, ha[d] seized control of Montenegro".

The Balkan Investigative Reporting Network meanwhile published an opinion piece which noted that the Church had the right to perform the ceremony in its ecclesiastical seat and those opposed to this also had the right to peaceful protest, but that Đukanović and his party had deliberately flared up tensions and unrest hoping to uphold their waning power and wreck the unstable ruling coalition. It also noted that "the stage was set for that violence when, on August 15, Veselin Veljovic, the former police chief and now advisor to DPS leader and President Djukanovic, wrote an op-ed calling on Montenegrins to rally in Cetinje in early September against Joanikije's enthronement". Political scientist Florian Bieber acknowledged the growing influence of Serbia but noted that the enthronement itself was not indicative of that, given that previous ceremonies were held in Cetinje and that ultimately "the politicisation of this normally religious ceremony was promoted by both nationalists or rather their political promoters". Srđan Cvijić commented that Đukanović "discredited his party in the eyes of the vast majority of the population of the country" by fostering tensions and inciting conflict.

The Ministry of Foreign Affairs of Russia came out in support of the Serbian Orthodox Church and Patriarch Porfirije. The publication about the enthronement posted on the official web site of the Russian Orthodox Church (ROC) made a point by commenting: "Being an atheist by conviction, M. Đukanović lobbies for the interests of the schismatic structure ′Montenegrin Orthodox Church′, which is not recognized in the Orthodox world.″ Delivering a sermon in Jasenovac, Croatia, on 13 September 2021, Patriarch Porfirije dwelt on the events in Cetinje eight days prior, saying, among other things, this: "[...] by using straw man arguments, by force, someone sought to prevent us from entering our house, seeking to show that when we try, taking care not to hurt anyone, to enter our house in the most peaceful way, we will be declared abusers." Porfirije′s reaction voiced in Jasenovac followed multiple publications and interviews in Croatian news outlets that sought to present the Serbian Orthodox Church as a "criminal", "terrorist" organisation that ought to be banned in Croatia as well as allegedly "the most powerful center of power in Montenegro currently".

=== Recriminations within the establishment of Montenegro and domestic politics ===
The violence that accompanied the enthronement caused a new crisis in Montenegro's government, as Zdravko Krivokapić on 6 September 2021 expressed his dissatisfaction with the response of the top echelon of the country′s security apparatus and said their responsibility would be looked into, with deputy prime minister Dritan Abazović in turn on 9 September threatening that the Civic Movement United Reform Action (URA) that he headed would bring down the government if the minister of the interior, Sergej Sekulović, and the director of the Police Department were replaced. According to inside sources cited by Russia′s Kommersant, the Ministry of Internal Affairs and the government had recommended cancelling the ceremony in Cetinje but the Serbian Orthodox prelates insisted and the prime minister fell into line in the early hours of 5 September, while Krivokopić said it was not until 4:30 a.m. on 5 September, when he threatened to risk his life and get on a helicopter with the prelates and go to Cetinje, that "part of the Police Directorate initiated a command process that lasted until 11 a.m.").

In an interview for Croatia′s Jutarnji list published on 11 September 2021, president Milo Đukanović stated that the enthronement that was carried out as an airborne military operation came as another one in a series of episodes in the renewed offensive of Serbian nationalism on Montenegro, adding: "The Government of Montenegro is in the service of the Church of Serbia, which is an instrument for implementing the Greater Serbia project, the official state policy of Belgrade. Serbia in turn is a political, security and intelligence base for implementing Russia′s geopolitical interests in the Balkans." Serbia′s president Aleksandar Vučić the following day responded by pointing out that Đukanović′s accusations were baseless and it was Đukanović who wanted Montenegro without Serbs.

On 12 September 2021, peaceful protests were held in Cetinje against "fascistization and clericalization of Montenegrin society", the protesters demanding resignation of prime minister Krivokapić. The following day, deputy prime minister Abazović offered his apologies to residents of Cetinje for the developments on 5 September.

On 14 September, the day the Cetinje Town Assembly held the pre-scheduled debates on the citizens′ Initiative to "return the Cetinje Monastery to the Montenegrin Orthodox Church", the government decreed that the monastery be in the ownership of state and banned any transfer of ownership rights on it (the Municipality of Cetinje was registered as the owner of the Cetinje Monastery in 2005). On its part, the Cetinje Town Assembly on 17 September adopted the "Conclusions" in connection with the Initiative, supporting the Initiative; the "Conclusions" also stated: "The Assembly of the Capital City of Cetinje strongly condemns and protests against the actions of the Government of Montenegro and calls on it to refrain from further illegal actions, and to withdraw the adopted acts and actions that seek to prohibit the Capital from managing the property in its undisputed ownership without legal grounds."
