= Aleksandar Bogdanović =

Aleksandar Bogdanović may refer to:

- Aleksandar Bogdanović (footballer) (born 1973), Serbian footballer
- Aleksandar Bogdanović (politician) (born 1977), Montenegrin politician
