= Dritan Abazović =

Prime Minister of Montenegro from 2022 to 2023

- Дритан Абазовић
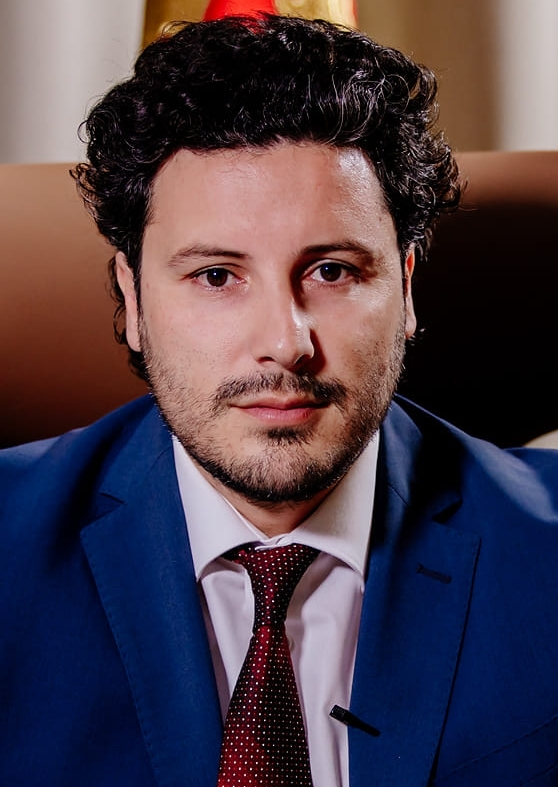
- Official portrait, 2022

Prime Minister of Montenegro
- In office 28 April 2022 – 31 October 2023
- President: Milo Đukanović; Jakov Milatović
- Deputy: Vladimir Joković; Raško Konjević; Jovana Marović; Ervin Ibrahimović
- Preceded by: Zdravko Krivokapić
- Succeeded by: Milojko Spajić

Minister of Foreign Affairs
- Acting; 21 October 2022 – 31 October 2023
- Prime Minister: Himself
- Preceded by: Ranko Krivokapić
- Succeeded by: Filip Ivanović

Deputy Prime Minister of Montenegro
- In office 4 December 2020 – 28 April 2022
- Prime Minister: Zdravko Krivokapić
- Preceded by: Zoran Pažin; Milutin Simović; Rafet Husović
- Succeeded by: Vladimir Joković; Raško Konjević; Jovana Marović; Ervin Ibrahimović
Parliamentary offices
Member of Parliament
In office
14 October 2012 – 4 December 2020

Personal details
- Born: 25 December 1985 (age 40) Ulcinj, SR Montenegro, SFR Yugoslavia (now Montenegro)
- Party: United Reform Action (2015–present)
- Other political affiliations: Positive Montenegro (2012–2014)
- Education: University of Sarajevo; University of Montenegro
- Occupation: Politician
- Website: dritan.me

Military service
- Allegiance: Montenegro
- Branch/service: Armed Forces of Montenegro
- Years of service: 2022–2023

Dritan Abazović (Montenegrin Cyrillic: Дритан Абазовић, Albanian: Dritan Abazi; born 25 December 1985) is a Montenegrin politician who served as Prime Minister of Montenegro and as acting Minister of Foreign Affairs from 2022 to 2023. An ethnic Albanian, he heads the United Reform Action party. He previously served as deputy prime minister in the cabinet of Zdravko Krivokapić from 2020 until 2022.

Abazović is the first ethnic Albanian and first Muslim to have served as Prime Minister of Montenegro.

== Early life, education and early career ==
Abazović was born on 25 December 1985 in Ulcinj, Montenegro. Abazović is an ethnic Albanian. Having finished elementary and secondary school in Ulcinj, he graduated at the Faculty of Political Sciences at the University of Sarajevo, becoming a valedictorian and winner of the "Golden Badge" and "Golden Charter" of the University of Sarajevo. He obtained a master's degree in international relations from the University of Montenegro Faculty of Political Sciences in 2008. In 2019, he finished his PhD in the Faculty of Political Science at the University of Sarajevo, having defended his doctoral dissertation titled "Global Politics—Ethical Aspects of Globalization".

He has worked as a high school teacher in Ulcinj, teaching the sociology of culture, communication and the history of religion.

From 2005 to 2007, he was an assistant at the Faculty of Political Science at the University of Sarajevo. In 2009, he completed the course for the Study of Peace at the University of Oslo. At the same university, he completed a seminar for professional development. In 2011, he resided in the United States while participating in the State Department program in Washington, D.C. From 2010 to 2012, he was the executive director of the local broadcasting company Teuta, as well as the NGO Mogul, both centered in Ulcinj.

In 2010, he published his first book titled Cosmopolitan Culture and Global Justice.

He has held lectures at various prestigious universities, including Harvard University, University of Oxford, University of Cambridge, Columbia University, LUMSA University, Tulane University, University of Belgrade etc.

== Political career ==
=== Opposition (2012–2020) ===
Abazović was one of the founders of the social liberal political party Positive Montenegro in 2012. At the 2012 Montenegrin parliamentary election, the party won 7 out of 81 seats, leading to Abazović becoming the youngest member of the new convocation of the Parliament of Montenegro.

In 2014, following a split in the party, Abazović left Positive Montenegro, serving as an independent MP before joining the newly founded United Reform Action (URA) in 2015. He is currently the president of URA and served as one of its parliamentary representatives from 2015 to 2020.

In June 2020, delegates from thirty-eight European countries voted at the XXXI Congress to admit Civic Movement URA to the European Green Party, making Civic Movement URA the first opposition party in independent Montenegro to join a family of European parties.

On 11 July 2020, the Civic Movement URA decided to run independently, presenting its centre-left election platform under the name In Black and White. The list was led by independent candidates, including well known journalist and activist Milka Tadić, several university professors, journalists, civil society and NGO activists. Abazović was the ballot carrier of the list, as the leader of URA. The URA electoral list also included one representative of the Bosniak minority interests SPP party, as well as several minor local initiatives.

The 2020 parliamentary elections in Montenegro achieved the first democratic change of government in the history of the country. Abazović's electoral list won four mandates, which proved to be crucial in unseating the Democratic Party of Socialists (DPS) led by Milo Đukanović after 30 years. Abazović, on behalf of URA, and the leaders of the lists For the Future of Montenegro and Peace is Our Nation, Zdravko Krivokapić and Aleksa Bečić, agreed during a meeting on several principles on which the future government would rest, including the formation of an expert government, a continuation of the European Union accession process, the fight against corruption and overcoming the polarization of Montenegrin society. They invited minority parties of Bosniaks and Albanians, wishing to form a large coalition government, which the minority parties would ultimately decline. After the election, Abazović's interview with Professor Kenneth Morrison was published by the London School of Economics and Political Science (LSE).

=== Deputy Prime Minister of Montenegro (2020–2022) ===
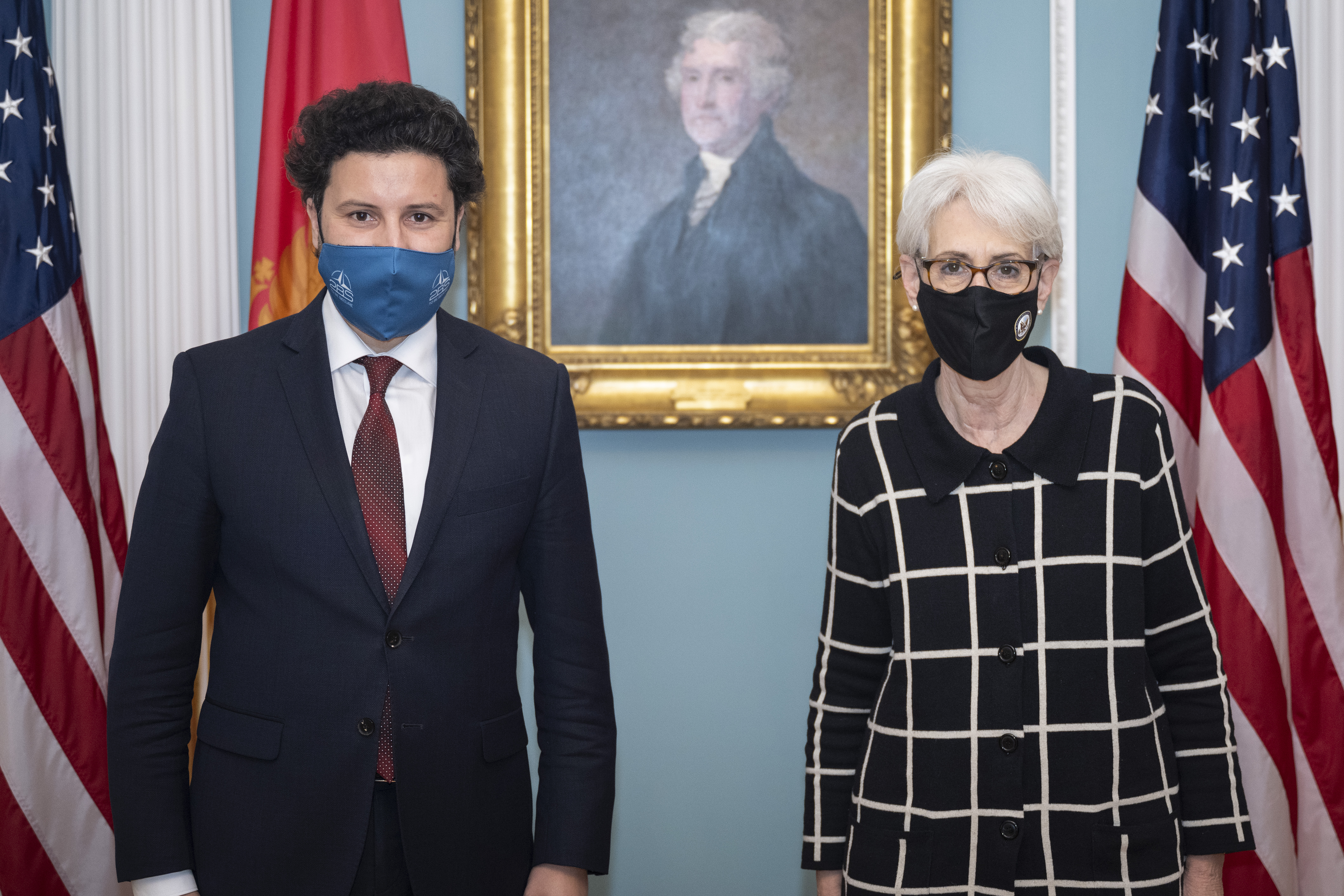
Abazović alongside U.S. Deputy Secretary of State Wendy Sherman, 19 October 2021

On 4 December 2020, the new big tent cabinet of Montenegro was elected by 41 out of 81 members of the Parliament of Montenegro, and independent politician Zdravko Krivokapić became the new Prime Minister of Montenegro, with Abazović as Deputy Prime Minister in charge of security sector coordination and national security, formally ending three decades of DPS rule in the country. The new cabinet vowed to dismantle the state apparatus built by the DPS, and root out corruption and organized crime. In January 2022, Abazović was appointed as a member of the advisory board of the Institute for Freedom of Faith and Security in Europe.

On 5 January 2021, Abazović revealed that the company "Global Montenegro", owned in part by President Milo Đukanović, was in a 12.45 million euro debt to the state and that there were no more "untouchable" officials. The following day, construction and casino magnate with alleged ties to organized crime Brano Mićunović was apprehended in Budva. Abazović congratulated the police and National Security Agency for the action. Mićunović was released on 8 January to be allowed to prepare his defense.

Following the violent clashes that erupted in Cetinje during the enthronement of the new Metropolitan of Montenegro and the Littoral Joanikije Mićović on 5 September 2021, tensions erupted in the ruling majority. The following day, Deputy Prime Minister Abazović, Interior Minister Sergej Sekulović and police chief Zoran Brđanin were accused of being against the event being held in Cetinje by several media outlets, with Democratic Front (DF) leader Andrija Mandić and Democratic Montenegro MP Danilo Šaranović echoing their remarks. Prime Minister Zdravko Krivokapić announced an internal investigation into the events, refusing to comment on the potential dismissal of Sekulović and Brđanin. On 7 September, DF leader Nebojša Medojević called on the two to resign, claiming they were part of a conspiracy designed to return the DPS to power by violent means. The following day, Abazović said that the government was crossing a "red line", warning that the dismissal of Sekulović would lead to him retracting support from the government and working to overthrow it. The cabinet of Prime Minister Krivokapić declined to issue a statement on the matter until the internal investigation was finished. On 1 November, following a closed meeting of the Security and Defense Committee, Abazović reiterated his support for the security sector, saying they had "preserved the peace, which was the area of highest risk". Minister Sekulović also defended his actions during the first meeting of the committee on 27 September. These events signaled the "beginning of the end" of Krivokapić's government, eventually leading to it being toppled in a no-confidence vote several months later.

=== Premiership (2022–2023) ===
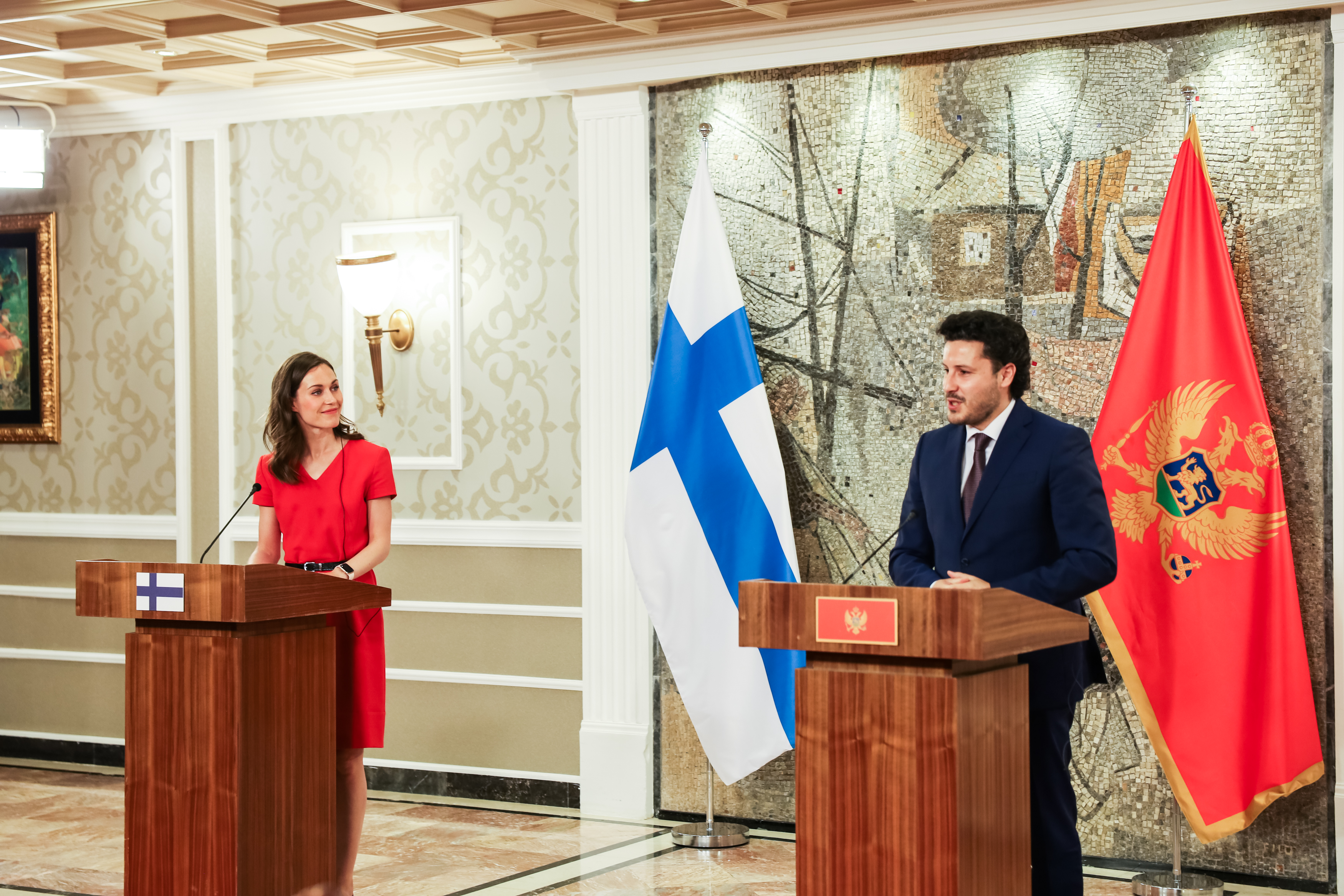
Abazović in a press conference with Finnish Prime Minister Sanna Marin, 20 June 2022

On 3 March 2022, President Đukanović asked Abazović to form a new government following a no-confidence vote in early February against Krivokapić. On 28 April, Montenegro's parliament approved a new government composed of a broad coalition of both pro-European and pro-Serb parties, with Abazović as prime minister. Abazović told lawmakers the new government's main focus will be the reforms required by the EU so that Montenegro can ask to speed up its accession process in the light of the new situation created by the Russian invasion of Ukraine. He added that government priorities will be the fight against corruption, more sustainable investments and development, protection of the environment and better care for children and youth.

On 20 August 2022, the Parliament of Montenegro passed a motion of no confidence against Abazović's government, which ended his premiership. He remained in power as a caretaker prime minister pending the formation of a new government.

On 7 July 2023, Abazović attended a Srebrenica massacre memorial for the 28th anniversary of the massacre. However, his remarks drew controversy after a speech where he claimed, "genocide was not committed against Bosniaks, but against people. And it was not committed by the armies, but by the policies of evil, death and fraud."

== Personal life ==
Abazović is an ethnic Albanian and a Muslim. Besides his native Albanian, he is also fluent in Serbo-Croatian and English. In 2017, he signed the Declaration on the Common Language of the Montenegrins, Croats, Serbs and Bosniaks.

== Honours ==
=== Honorary degrees ===
- 2021 – Honorary Doctorate, Luarasi University (Albania)
- 2022 – Honorary Doctorate, Swiss UMEF (Switzerland)
- 2023 – Honorary Doctorate, Mediterranean University of Albania
- 2023 – Honorary Doctorate, Universum College (Kosovo)
- 2023 – Honorary Doctorate, Istanbul Medeniyet University (Turkey)

=== Other awards ===
- Certificate of Special Congressional Recognition presented by the U.S. representative Nicole Malliotakis. (United States) (26 September 2022)
- Honorary Citizen of New Orleans issued by LaToya Cantrell, Mayor of the City of New Orleans
- Key to the City of New Orleans
- Honorary Ambassador of Louisiana awarded by Billy Nungesser, Lieutenant Governor
- Special IFIMES award presented by the Honorary President of IFIMES Stjepan Mesić

== Bibliography ==
=== Books ===
- Kosmopolitska kultura i globalna pravda (en.Cosmopolitan culture and global justice) (2009)
- A Critique of Global Ethics (2022)

Political offices
Preceded by Zdravko Krivokapić	Prime Minister of Montenegro; 2022–2023	Succeeded by Milojko Spajić
