= In Black and White (Montenegro) =

Political party alliance in Montenegro

In Black and White Crno na bijelo Црно на бијело
- Leader: Dritan Abazović
- Founded: 13 July 2020
- Dissolved: 2023
- Headquarters: Podgorica
- Ideology: Progressivism; Social liberalism; Green politics; Minority rights; Pro-Europeanism
- Political position: Centre to centre-left
- European affiliation: European Greens
- Parliament: 4 / 81
- Mayors: 1 / 25
- Local Parliaments: 37 / 847

Website
- ura.org.me/

The Civic Platform "In Black and White" (Montenegrin: Otvorena građanska platforma "Crno na bijelo"/Отворена грађaнска платформа "Црно на бијело"), also branded as "In Black and White - The Citizens" (Crno na bijelo - Građani), known colloquially just as the In Black and White, was a social liberal, green and pro-European political platform and electoral list in Montenegro, launched by the Civic Movement URA, as well supported by European Greens prior to the 2020 parliamentary election.

Since the constitution of the 11th assembly of the national parliament, URA and the Civis continued their alliance within the "In Black and White" parliamentary group. In addition to the URA and Civis, the coalition is also composed of several non-parliamentary minority interests, single-issue and regionalist parties, as well some independent liberal political organizations and NGOs. List also participated in 2020 and 2021 local elections. In the 2023 general elections, Civis runs on the Evropa Sad! lists and ends the coalition with URA.

== History ==
=== 2020 election ===
The Civic Movement URA decided to run independently at the August 2020 parliamentary election, presenting its liberal, green politics and anti-corruption "In black and white", election platform, led by independent candidates, including well-known journalist and activist Milka Tadić, some university professors, journalists, civic and NGO activists, with the party leader Dritan Abazović as a ballot carrier, continuing cooperation with the liberal NGO Citizens' Union "Civis". URA electoral list also contained one representative of the Bosniak minority interests Justice and Reconciliation Party, as well as some minor exra-parliamentary and localist parties and initiatives. The election resulted in a victory for the opposition parties and the fall from power of the ruling DPS, which has ruled the country since the introduction of the multi-party system in 1990. The coalition won 5.58% of the popular vote, which equals 4 seats in the parliament. Day after the election, coalition list leader Abazović and the leaders of the lists For the Future and Peace is Our Nation, Zdravko Krivokapić and Aleksa Bečić, agreed during a meeting on several principles on which the future government will rest, including the formation of an expert government, to continue to work on the European Union accession process, fight against corruption, reforms, as well overcoming society polarization.

=== Further activities ===
On 4 December 2020, the new big tent cabinet of Montenegro was elected by 41 out of 81 members of the Parliament of Montenegro, and independent candidate Zdravko Krivokapić became the new Prime Minister of Montenegro, with the URA leader Dritan Abazović as new Deputy Prime Minister, formally ending three decades of the DPS regime in the country.

After the election, Civis organization grew into a political party and has a single representative in the parliament which belongs to dr Srđan Pavićević, while URA keeps the other three seats won. In September 2020, two parties formed a joint parliamentary group named after its election platform, continuing to support and participate in the expert government of Zdravko Krivokapić. All political opinion polls published in the immediate aftermath of the election showed an increase in the ratings of the coalition led by Abazović, from the 5.5% they won at the election to between 8–13% of the popular support.

== Electoral performance ==
=== Parliamentary election ===
Parliament of Montenegro
Year	Popular vote	% of popular votes	Overall seats won	Government
2020	22,679	5.54%	4 / 81	government

== Parliamentary group ==
Member	Main ideology	Position	Leader	No. of seats
URA	Social liberalism Green politics	Centre to centre-left	Dritan Abazović	3 / 81
Civis	Liberalism; Technocracy	Centre to centre-left	Srđan Pavićević	1 / 81
