= Vladimir Leposavić =

Montenegrin lawyer and politician

Vladimir Leposavić Владимир Лепосавић
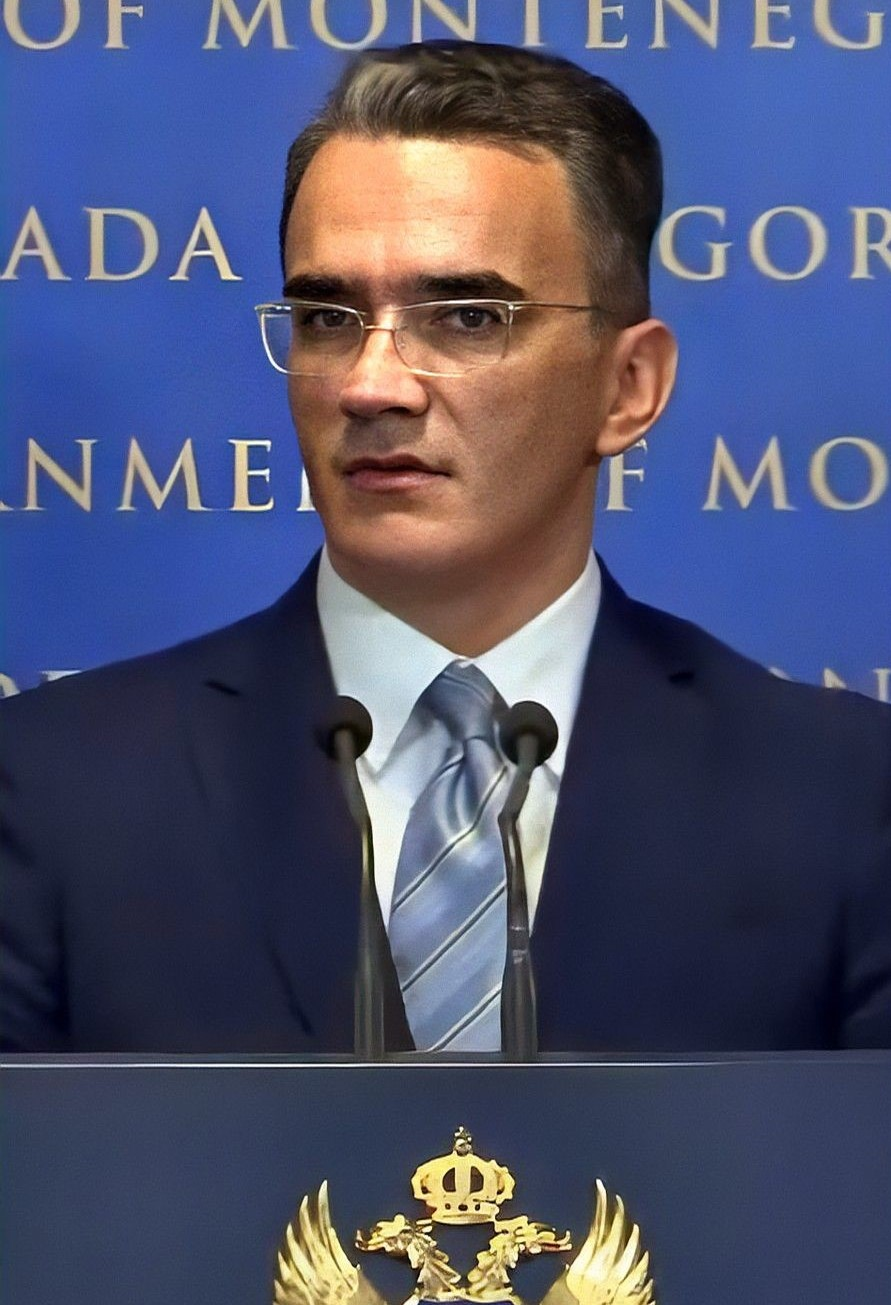
- Vladimir Leposavić in December 2020.

Minister of Justice and Human and Minority Rights of Montenegro
- In office 4 December 2020 – 17 June 2021
- Prime Minister: Zdravko Krivokapić
- Preceded by: Zoran Pažin (as Minister of Justice of Montenegro); Mehmet Zenka (as Minister of Human and Minority Rights)
- Succeeded by: Zdravko Krivokapić (acting); Sergej Sekulović (acting)

Personal details
- Born: 24 August 1984 (age 42) Bar, SFR Yugoslavia (now Montenegro)
- Party: Independent
- Education: University of Belgrade
- Occupation: Lawyer, politician

Vladimir Leposavić (Serbian Cyrillic: Владимир Лепосавић; born 24 August 1984) is a Montenegrin lawyer and politician who served as the Minister of Justice and Human and Minority Rights in the Government of Montenegro and the cabinet of Zdravko Krivokapić from 4 December 2020 to 17 June 2021. Prior to this, he was a senior legal advisor of the Metropolitanate of Montenegro and the Littoral and the Serbian Orthodox Church in Montenegro.

== Early life and law career ==
Vladimir Leposavić was born on 24 August 1984 in the town of Bar, Montenegro which was then part of the Socialist Federal Republic of Yugoslavia. In 2008, he graduated from the Faculty of Law, University of Belgrade. He is a three-time winner of the University of Belgrade award for professional work in the field of legal and economic sciences.

He received the Robert Schuman Foundation Scholarship Award in 2008 and was also the winner of the prestigious Fulbright Program Scholarship Award for academic and professional results in 2014. As a Fulbright Visiting Researcher, he specialized in the field of international human rights at the American University Washington College of Law in Washington D.C., and received his doctorate in the field of international protection of minorities in 2016, at the Faculty of Law, University of Belgrade.

In 2006, he served as legal assistant for the United Nations High Commissioner for Refugees Belgrade office, providing assistance to refugees and internally displaced persons. He provided other legal assistance as a Trainee Solicitor for two Belgrade law firms from 2007 to 2009.

Leposavić was a Senior University Lecturer at the Faculty of Law at the Mediterranean University in Podgorica from 2009 to 2016 and a law professor at the Union–Nikola Tesla University in Belgrade from 2016 to 2018.

During his tenures, he taught Comparative Law and Political Systems, International Human Rights law, European Union law, Sociology of Law, Diplomatic and Consular Law, and Copyright Law. In 2019, he was awarded Teacher of the Year for his work as a trainer and licensed mediator for the National Center for Mediation in Dispute Resolution in Belgrade. He is the author of three monographs and several scientific studies and articles in the field of interstate law and international human rights. His book "Caught in the Exercise of Their Rights" was published by Matica Srpska - Association of Members in Montenegro, which quickly attracted the attention of both the scientific and professional communities, as well as the general public. From 2018 to 2020, he served as the senior legal advisor of the Metropolitanate of Montenegro and the Littoral and the Serbian Orthodox Church in Montenegro, and has often emphasized the unconstitutionality of the controversial Law on Freedom of Religion that targets the Serbian Orthodox Church.

== Political career ==
In the 2012 parliamentary elections, Leposavić supported and spoke at a rally of the Serb Unity, a coalition of Serb nationalist parties made up of the now-defunct Serb List of Dobrilo Dedeić, the People's Party of Predrag Popović, the Patriotic Serb Party of Aleksandar Stamatović and the Party of Serb Radicals. The leader of that coalition was the representative of the People's Party, Jovan Markuš, the former Mayor of Cetinje.

In 2014, Leposavić supported the Socialist People's Party of Srđan Milić in the local elections and gave a speech at their campaign rally. In his speech he strongly criticized possible Montenegrin accession to NATO.

Since 4 December 2020, he has been serving as the Minister of Justice and Human and Minority Rights in the Government of Montenegro and the cabinet of Zdravko Krivokapić. By his political opponents, Leposavić has been labelled a Serbian nationalist.

He was dismissed from the post of the Minister of Justice and Human and Minority Rights in the Government of Montenegro on 17 June 2021 after a majority of the MP's voted for his dismissal following his comments regarding Srebrenica genocide. 43 MPs voted in favor of his dismissal, 27 voted against, whereas 10 were neutral.

== Controversy ==
=== Srebrenica massacre statement ===
Leposavić became the subject of controversy after he stated in the Parliament of Montenegro that he was ready to admit that the "act of genocide happened in Srebrenica when it was unequivocally determined". He said he would "certainly not deny the legal importance of the decisions of international bodies" even though the International Crime Tribunal for the former Yugoslavia, which ruled that genocide happened in Srebrenica, "completely lost its legitimacy when it was determined that the evidence of the Council of Europe rapporteur on the extraction and trafficking of organs of Serb civilian victims in Kosovo was destroyed in that court". The US and British embassies in Podgorica condemned his comments and the US embassy immediately called the Montenegrin government to take a clear stance and "unequivocally condemn the massacre and call it what it was – genocide". In response, the Montenegrin government officially declared that "respects […] the Declaration of Acceptance of the Resolution of the European Parliament adopted by the Parliament of Montenegro in 2009, which condemns the crime of genocide in Srebrenica committed in 1995, as well as all other war crimes committed during the conflict in the former Yugoslavia".

On 5 April 2021, Prime Minister Krivokapić announced that he sent a proposal for Leposavić's removal due to his stance on Srebrenica to the Parliament of Montenegro, while the head of the Democratic Front (DF) parliamentary group Slaven Radunović stated that every "Serb in Montenegro has the same stance as Leposavić" and that "while DF exists, his removal will not happen". On the same day, protests were held in multiple cities in Montenegro against Leposavić's removal. Leposavić announced that he will not resign and that he will perform his job until the parliament removes him and stated that the members of the government "were not elected by foreign allies, but by citizens through their MP's".

== Personal life ==
Leposavić is married to a Vietnamese-American Vy Nguyen who works in the United States Department of Defence.
