= Ministry of Ecology, Spatial planning and Urbanism (Montenegro) =

Ministry of Ecology, Spatial planning and Urbanism of Montenegro
- Ministarstvo ekologije, prostornog planiranja i urbanizma Crne Gore

Agency overview
- Formed: 2006 (2020)
- Jurisdiction: Government of Montenegro
- Headquarters: Podgorica
- Agency executive: Ana Novaković Đurović, Minister of Ecology, Spatial planning and Urbanism of Montenegro
- Website: mrt.gov.me

Minister of Ecology, Spatial Planning and Urbanism (Montenegrin: Ministar ekologije, prostornog planiranja i urbanizma) is the person in charge of the Ministry of Ecology, Spatial Planning and Urbanism of Montenegro (Ministarstvo ekologije, prostornog planiranja i urbanizma). The ministry was formed in 2020 with reorganization of the Ministry of Sustainable Development and Tourism (Montenegrin: Ministarstvo održivog razvoja i turizma).

== Ministers of Sustainable Development and Tourism, since 2006 ==
Democratic Party of Socialists URA Independent

Minister	Start of term	End of term
Predrag Nenezić	10 November 2006	29 December 2010
Predrag Sekulić	29 December 2010	4 December 2012
Branimir Gvozdenović	4 December 2012	28 November 2016
Pavle Radulović	28 November 2016	4 December 2020
Ratko Mitrović	4 December 2020	28 April 2022
Ana Novaković Đurović	28 April 2022	incumbent
