= Aleksandar Bogdanović (politician) =

Montenegrin politician

Aleksandar Bogdanović Александар Богдановић

Minister of Culture of Montenegro
- In office 28 December 2017 – 4 December 2020
- Prime Minister: Duško Marković
- Preceded by: Janko Ljumović
- Succeeded by: Vesna Bratić (as Education, Science, Culture and Sports)

Mayor of Cetinje
- In office 23 November 2010 – 28 December 2017
- Preceded by: Milovan Janković
- Succeeded by: Aleksandar Kašćelan

Personal details
- Born: 11 March 1977 (age 49) Cetinje, SR Montenegro, SFR Yugoslavia
- Party: Democratic Party of Socialists
- Spouse: Milena Marović
- Occupation: Politician

Aleksandar Bogdanović (Montenegrin Cyrillic: Александар Богдановић; born 11 March 1977) is a Montenegrin politician, former minister of culture in Government of Montenegro and former mayor of Cetinje, deputy of Democratic Party of Socialists in Parliament of Montenegro.

== Biography ==
He was born on 11 March 1977 in Cetinje. Finishing high school in California, Bogdanović graduated management in Belgrade. From 2000 to 2005, served in Ministry of Economy, and from 2005 he was an advisor of President of Montenegro Filip Vujanović.

In 2009, Bogdanović became a youngest MP in Parliament of Montenegro, as a member of Democratic Party of Socialists. In 2010, Bogdanović started his mandate as mayor of Cetinje. On 2013, after an absolute win on Cetinje local elections, he gained another mandate on that position.

In 2017, Government of Montenegro informed that Bogdanović would be a new minister of culture. That proposal was approved by Parliament of Montenegro on 28 December 2017.

== Other work ==
=== Memberships and awards ===
He was also a member of Permanent High Level Group (PHLG) and representative of Montenegro in the Athens process. From 2011 to 2014, he was the President of the Union of municipalities of Montenegro. In December 2014, he was elected as a President of the Board of the Union of municipalities of Montenegro.
Bogdanović was awarded as Best Mayor of the region in 2014, during the ceremony for the election of the best manager and the best company of Southeastern and Middle Europe (Sarajevo). During the same year, President of Italy Giorgio Napolitano awarded Bogdanović with the Order of the Star of Italy, the most significant acknowledgement that is being awarded to foreign citizens for extraordinary contribution to the promotion of Italian culture.

Ribbon bar	Award or decoration	Country	Date	Place	Note	Ref.
	Order of the Star of Italy	Italy	3 June 2014	Rome		

=== Academic Work ===
From 2007 to 2011, Aleksandar Bogdanović was lecturer at the Faculty of Administrative and European Studies (FDES) in Podgorica, on the subjects Economy of public sector and Public finances of the EU. He was guest lecturer at the University in Belgrade, Diplomatic Academy and University in Sofia.

=== Sports ===
From 2013 to 2018, Bogdanović was a president of Football Club Lovćen. During his mandate, FK Lovćen won Montenegrin Cup (2014) and played first-ever and so far the only season in UEFA competitions.

== Personal life ==
Since 2012, Aleksandar Bogdanović is married to Milena Marović. He lives in Cetinje, where is the seat of Ministry of Culture, too. He speaks English and Spanish language.
