= Zoran Pažin =

Montenegrin jurist and politician

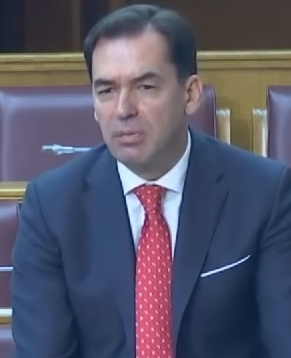
Pažin in November 2019.

Zoran Pažin (Montenegrin Cyrillic: Зоран Пажин; born 29 August 1966 in Šibenik, Croatia) is a Montenegrin jurist and politician, former Minister of Justice and Deputy Prime Minister of Montenegro since was appointed by Duško Marković on 28 November 2016, and until 4 December 2020, when he was succeeded by Vladimir Leposavić as the new Minister of Justice and Dritan Abazović, as new Deputy Prime Minister of Montenegro.

== Biography ==
Graduated in Laws by the University of Belgrade Faculty of Law, he served as judge of the Basic Court in Podgorica and representative of Montenegro before the Strasbourg Court. He is an independent politician affiliated with the ruling DPS.

During his tenure as the Minister of Justice (from 2016 to 2020), Pažin was often described as one of the most powerful people in Montenegro.

In 2019 he was one of the main initiators of the controversial law on religious communities, which de jure transfers the ownership of church buildings and estates from the Serbian Orthodox Church in Montenegro to the Montenegrin state.

As of late December 2019, the newly proclaimed religion law, sparked a series of massive protests followed with road blockages, which continued to August 2020. He was elected a member of the Parliament of Montenegro, at the 2020 parliamentary elections, which resulted in victory for the opposition parties and the fall from power of the DPS, which had ruled the country since the introduction of the multi-party system in 1990. Pažin was elected from the electoral list of the ruling DPS, but resigned from the office of deputy in the parliament, soon after the announcement of the election results.
