= Aleksandar Stijović =

Montenegrin politician (born 1981)

Aleksandar Stijović Александар Стијовић

Minister of Agriculture, Forestry and Water Management of Montenegro
- In office 4 December 2020 – 28 April 2022
- Prime Minister: Zdravko Krivokapić
- Preceded by: Milutin Simović
- Succeeded by: Vladimir Joković

Personal details
- Born: 27 January 1981 (age 45) SR Serbia, SFR Yugoslavia
- Party: Independent
- Education: University of Belgrade
- Profession: Forestry engineer

Aleksandar Stijović (Serbian Cyrillic: Александар Стијовић; born 27 January 1981) is a Montenegrin forestry engineer and politician. He served as Minister of Agriculture, Forestry and Water Management in the Government of Montenegro and the cabinet of Zdravko Krivokapić from 2020 to 2022.

== Biography ==
Stijović was born in SR Serbia in 1981. Aleksandar Stijović graduated from a forestry high school in Berane, then enrolled at the Faculty of Forestry, University of Belgrade, where he graduated with a bachelor's degree and later earned a master's degree with a thesis “Use of forest biomass in mountainous conditions of Montenegro".

=== Professional career ===
As a chief engineer, he was employed at the Institute of Forestry of Montenegro from 2014 to 2018. For over eight years he was engaged in the Institute of Forestry of Montenegro on the project as an expert on forest health. He was engaged in many other projects lasting from several months to a year or more in important departments from the Delegation of the European Union in Podgorica through the National Parks of Montenegro, the International Center for Sustainable Development of Energy, Water and Environment, the European Bank for Rural Development, World Bank etc.

=== Political career ===
On 5 November 2020, the prime minister-designate of Montenegro, Zdravko Krivokapić, appointed him a candidate for the Minister of Agriculture, Forestry and Water Management in the new Government of Montenegro. He serves as minister in Krivokapić Cabinet as of 4 December 2020, when he was officially appointed by the parliament.
