= Ne damo Crnu Goru =

- Chairwoman: Vesna Bratić
- Council Chairman: Ratko Mitrović
- Founder: Zdravko Krivokapić
- Founded: 12 July 2020
- Headquarters: Podgorica
- Ideology: Christian democracy Liberal conservatism Anti-corruption; Pro-Europeanism; Serbian Orthodox believers interests
- Political position: Centre-right
- Religion: Serbian Orthodox Church
- National affiliation: For the Future (2020); Peace is Our Nation (2021)
- Slogan: "Next year at Mt. Lovćen"
- Cabinet positions (2020–2022): 7 out of 14 posts (both, by membership or by the affiliation)

Party flag

Ne damo Crnu Goru (Cyrillic: Не дамо Црну Гору), lit. 'We won't give up Montenegro', is a moderate right, pro-EU, pro-Serbian Orthodox Church, political organization in Montenegro. It became an influential civil and political movement during the 2020 religion law protests. The group was founded by Montenegrin professors and intellectuals in support of the Serbian Orthodox Church-led protests after a controversial law targeted the legal status and the property of the Church. Its founder and first chairman was university professor Zdravko Krivokapić, who led the opposition party For the Future of Montenegro at the 2020 parliamentary election.

== History ==
=== Organization founding ===
The Ne damo Crnu Goru organization was founded on 12 July 2020 in Podgorica, at the height of the 2019–2020 clerical protests in Montenegro.

The organization was founded by a group of Montenegrin university professors, academics, educators and intellectuals. Founding members included university professors and current Montenegrin government officials such as Zdravko Krivokapić, Ratko Mitrović, Vesna Bratić, diplomat Srećko Crnogorac, professor and former Faculty of Economics Podgorica dean Milivoje Radović. Other members included Montenegrin Academy of Sciences and Arts and Matica srpska members led by academic Igor Đurović, and professor and rector of University of Montenegro Vladimir Božović. The Serbian Orthodox Church in Montenegro, including its bishop Amfilohije, Metropolitan of Montenegro, supported the organization. The organization organized public events in which Bishop of Budimlja and Nikšić Joanikije (Mićović) and the Rector of the Theological Seminary in Cetinje, Gojko Perović participated, among others. Krivokapić resigned as chairman of the organization on 2 August 2020, after accepting the position of leader of the joint opposition, For the Future of Montenegro. He was succeeded by Vesna Bratić, also a professor at the University of Montenegro.

=== 2020 parliamentary election ===
For the August 2020 parliamentary election, the organization, backed by high-ranking Church officials, joined the opposition coalition For the Future of Montenegro. They, along with the alliances the Democratic Front and the Popular Movement, joined forces against Belgrade-based businessman Miodrag Davidović and the Socialist People's Party. The election resulted in a victory for the opposition parties and the defeat the ruling DPS, which had been in power for 30 years, since the introduction of the multi-party system in 1990. Krivokapić was selected as the prime minister-designate of Montenegro by the new parliamentary majority.

Krivokapić and his associates celebrated the election victory in the Podgorica Cathedral with Metropolitan Amfilohije. The following day, Krivokapić, together with the leaders of Peace is Our Nation and In Black and White, agreed to form an expert government, and to continue to work on the European Union accession process. Other goals included fighting against government corruption, the depoliticization of public institutions, the reform of electoral laws, as well reduction of social polarization of Montenegrin society. They also welcomed the minority parties of Bosniaks and Albanians to form a government with them.

Serbian pro-government tabloids criticized the coalition for refusing to discuss changing national symbols of Montenegro, the de-recognition of Kosovo, or the country's withdrawal from the NATO during the new government term, calling Krivokapić "Amfilohije's Prime Minister". After winning the election, Ne damo Crynu Goru gained popularity among the electorate, and according to the majority of opinion polls, Krivokapić was the most popular political leader in the country. According to a NSPM October 2020 hypothetical estimate, Ne damo Crnu Goru would have independently won about 24.5% of popular support at the election, which would have made it the largest political force in parliament. A CeDem hypothetical poll from June 2021 showed that only 5-8% of the voters would support the party at the next election.

=== Further activities ===
Since a political split with Krivokapić after he questioned their competence, leaders of the right-wing populist Democratic Front, Andrija Mandić and Nebojša Medojević, started to publicly criticize the alleged influence of the Serbian Orthodox Church, as well of the businessman Miodrag Davidović on Krivokapić decisions and on the composition of his cabinet. Mandić claimed that Krivokapić had been appointed head of "For the Future" after "pressure and conditioning of electoral support" by "parts of the Serbian Church", accusing the church and Krivokapić of "acting on someone's orders from abroad". Medojević stated that Bishop Joanikije Mićović and priest Gojko Perović set the terms of the church's support and threatened to withdraw Krivokapić from the electoral list, which Perović categorically denied. During October and November Medojević and Mandić repeatedly stated they would not support Krivokapić's cabinet if they were not part of it. Mandić asked Krivokapić to "return the mandate and that they would look for a new PM designate". A series of public insults by the two were publicly condemned by the Serbian Church, Krivokapić, Davidović, and also the DF's coalition partner, the Socialist People's Party. True Montenegro left the parliamentary group of the Democratic Front out of protest.

Since early 2021, despite the fact he is an independent politician, some media outlets and opposition parties, as well some parties in the parliamentary majority accused Krivokapić and Ne damo Crnu Goru of being affiliated and working with the centrist Democratic Montenegro (Democrats) led by the current President of the Parliament, Aleksa Bečić, which Krivokapić himself has repeatedly denied. During the 2021 municipal elections, parties affiliated with Krivokapić failed to form governments, leading to resentment among coalition members.

On 5 February 2022, shortly after the Krivokapić cabinet lost a no-confidence vote in the parliament, ministers Milojko Spajić and Jakov Milatović stated that they are in the process of forming an official political party, named Europe Now.

In September 2022, Krivokapić returned to politics. On 22 September 2022, he presented a new political party, founded by him and Dejan Vukšić, the former head of the Agency of National Security, the Demochristian Movement.

== See also ==
- Zdravko Krivokapić
- For the Future of Montenegro
- Popular Movement
