= Ranko Krivokapić =

Montenegrin politician

- Ранко Кривокапић
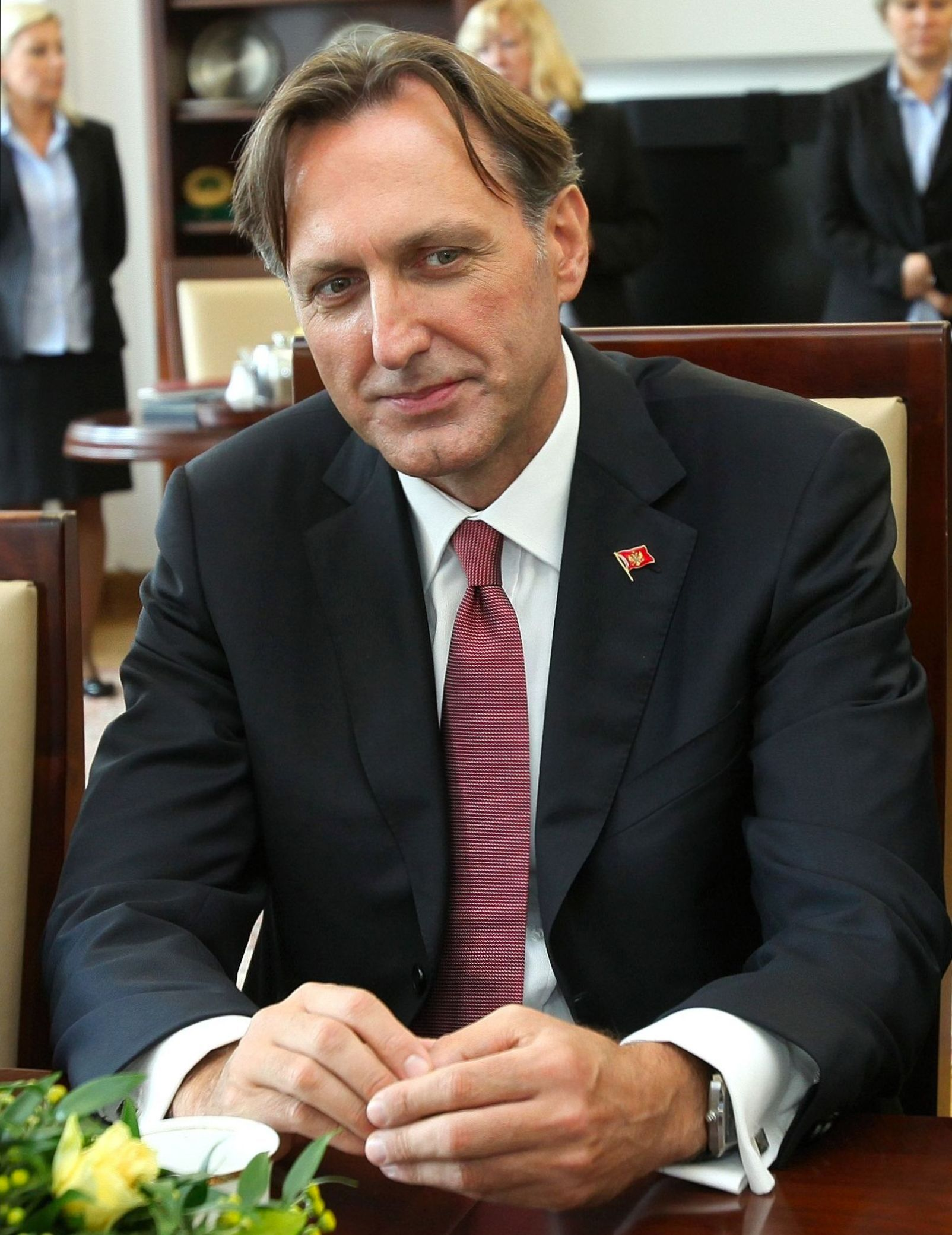
- Krivokapić in 2013

Minister of Foreign Affairs
- In office 28 April 2022 – 21 October 2022
- Prime Minister: Dritan Abazović
- Preceded by: Đorđe Radulović
- Succeeded by: Dritan Abazović

President of the Parliament of Montenegro
- In office 30 July 2003 – 18 May 2016
- Preceded by: Filip Vujanović
- Succeeded by: Darko Pajović

Member of the Parliament of Montenegro
- In office 31 May 1998 – 30 August 2020

Personal details
- Born: 17 August 1961 (age 65) Kotor, SR Montenegro, SFR Yugoslavia
- Party: Social Democratic Party
- Height: 2.02 m (6 ft 8 in)
- Education: University of Belgrade
- Profession: Lawyer, politician
- Website: Parliament website

Ranko Krivokapić (Montenegrin Cyrillic: Ранко Кривокапић; born August 17, 1961) is a Montenegrin politician who served as the minister of foreign affairs from April to October 2022. He is a former long-term President of the Parliament of Montenegro from 2003 to 2016, and the President of the Social Democratic Party (SDP) from 2002 until his resignation in 2017. He is currently the honorary president of the SDP. He is the longest-serving President of the Parliament of Montenegro in the country's history.

== Biography ==
Krivokapić was born on 17 August 1961 in Kotor, Montenegro, Yugoslavia. His political interest began in the late 1980s. He graduated from the University of Niš Law School, and started pursuing LLM at the University of Belgrade Faculty of Law. Besides his native language, Krivokapić speaks English.

=== Politics ===
He was elected a representative in Montenegrin Parliament six times, the first time being in 1989. He was a Montenegrin representative to the Parliament of Yugoslavia from 1993 to 1997. From 2003 to 2006, Krivokapić served as the speaker of Parliament of Montenegro within the state union of Serbia and Montenegro. Following the ratification of an independence referendum held in 2006 by the Parliament of Montenegro, Krivokapić became the president of a sovereign parliament rather than of a constituent state of a union.

He continued to serve in that position until his dismissal in 2016. After the poor results at May 2019 local elections Krivokapić decided to resign from the office of SDP president. In June 2019, Draginja Vuksanović was elected new president of the Party, Krivokapic has been named honorary president.

Since 28 April 2022, Krivokapić is serving as the minister of foreign affairs in the minority government of Dritan Abazović. However, Abazović removed him from office in October 2022.

== See also ==
- Social Democratic Party of Montenegro
