= Universum College =

University in Prishtina, Kosovo

- Universum College
- Established: 2005
- Location: Prishtinë, Kosovo; 42°33′38.3″N 21°08′16.9″E
- Website: universum-ks.org
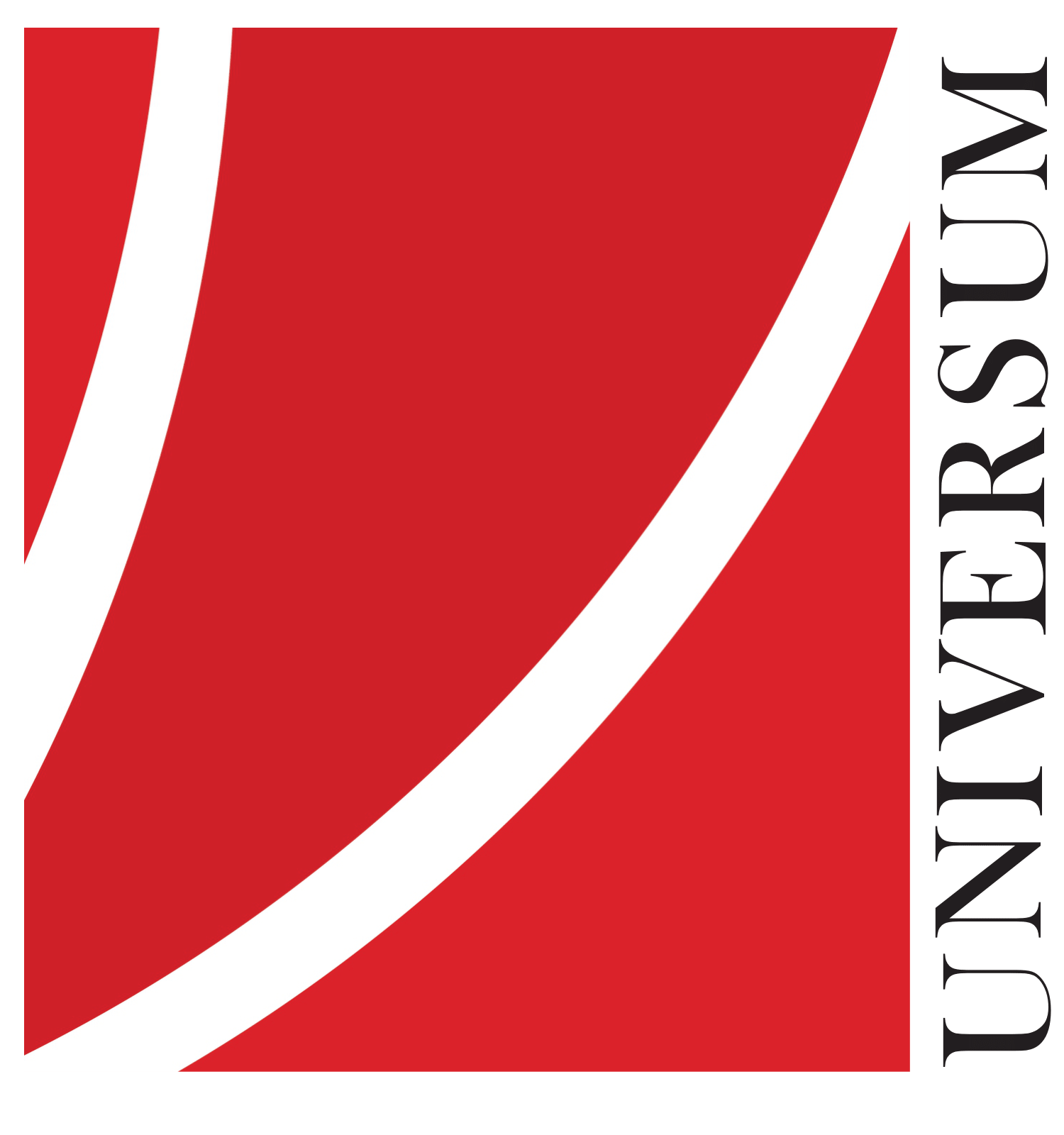

Universum College (Albanian: Kolegji Universum) is a university in Prishtina, Kosovo. It was founded in 2005.

== Campuses ==
Universum College has three campuses. One is located in Pristina (Lipjan), one in Ferizaj and one in Gjakova.

== Accreditation ==
Universum College was accredited by the Kosovo Accreditation Agency for the first time in 2009 and re-accredited in 2022 for a period of 5 years, for Bachelor and Master Studies.

== Balkan Journal ==
Balkan Journal (supported by: The U.S. Department of State and The U.S. Embassy Pristina) International Journal of Balkan Policy Research is a double-blind peer-reviewed journal published by Universum College in Kosovo with the financial support of the US Embassy in Kosovo and the US State Department.
