= Ministry of Agriculture and Rural Development (Montenegro) =

Ministry of Agriculture and Rural Development of Montenegro
- Ministarstvo poljoprivrede i ruralnog razvoja

Agency overview
- Formed: 2006
- Jurisdiction: Government of Montenegro
- Headquarters: Podgorica
- Agency executive: Vladimir Joković, Minister of Agriculture and Rural Development of Montenegro
- Website: minpolj.gov.me

Minister of Agriculture (Montenegrin: Министар пољопривреде / Ministar poljoprivrede) is the person in charge of the Ministry of Agriculture and Rural Development of Montenegro. Vladimir Joković is the current Minister of Agriculture and Rural Development, since 28 April 2022.

== Ministers of Agriculture, since 2006 ==
Democratic Party of Socialists Independent Socialist People's Party

Minister	Start of term	End of term
Milutin Simović	10 November 2006	29 December 2010
Tarzan Milošević	29 December 2010	4 December 2012
Petar Ivanović	4 December 2012	12 May 2016
Budimir Mugoša	12 May 2016	28 November 2016
Milutin Simović	28 November 2016	4 December 2020
Aleksandar Stijović	4 December 2020	28 April 2022
Vladimir Joković	28 April 2022	Incumbent
