= 2013 Cetinje local election =

Local election in Montenegro

The 2013 Old Royal Capital Cetinje municipal elections was held in Montenegro on Saturday, November 16, 2013 to elect representatives in the City Parliament of the Old Royal Capital Cetinje. All 33 seats were up for elections. In the previous mandate (2010 - 2013), Cetinje was governed by Democratic Party of Socialists (DPS), with mayor Aleksandar Bogdanović.

There was eight parties which participated in the elections, and DPS won the absolute majority or 19 seats in City Parliament.

== Election Law ==
Under Montenegrin Election Law, lists and parties on the local elections must require support 3% of voters to gain one seat in the City Parliament. On every list, there must be 33 candidates for deputies or less.

Deputies in the City Parliament are voting for new mayor, with minimum support of 51 percent.

== Parties and campaign ==
Before campaign started, eight different parties signed their candidatures for the elections. City Elections' Commission verified all the lists.

=== Participants ===
Officially, participants of the Cetinje municipal elections 2013 were sorted by order and names from the next list:

Number	Party	Name of the list
1	Movement for the Rule of Law	Pokret za časno Cetinje
2	Rightly Montenegro	Pravda za prijestonicu
3	Democratic Party of Socialists	Da pobijedi Cetinje! - Milo Đukanović
4	Liberal Party	Za Cetinje, nego što
5	Social Democratic Party	Možemo bolje
6	Civic Front	Građanski front - Miodrag Lekić
7	Positive Montenegro	Srcem za Cetinje
8	Socialist People's Party	Za naše Cetinje - istinsku prijestonicu Crne Gore

=== Campaign ===
Campaign for the local elections started during the first half of October 2013. During that period, the governing DPS with the slogan "Simply Better!" highlighted the results of local government's work during the previous mandate as the guarantee of good work in the future. Leader of DPS list was Mayor of the Old Royal Capital Cetinje Aleksandar Bogdanović.

Opposition parties criticized projects and priorities of the local government from the past period. During the finish of campaign, opposition parties announced their past-elections coalition if they gain majority of votes.

=== Opinion polls ===
One week before elections, few medias reported about public opinion poll (http://www.pobjeda.me/2013/11/06/istrazivanje-javnog-mnjenja-dps-na-lokalnim-izborima-na-cetinju-osvojice-apsolutnu-vecinu/#.UuO46fs1jGg). The results indicated a big majority for the Democratic Party of Socialists - Da pobijedi Cetinje! - Milo Đukanović(48.5%).

== Voters and poll ==
On the Cetinje municipal elections 2013, voting right had 14,868 citizens from the whole territory of the Old Royal Capital Cetinje.

There was 39 polling stations.

== Results ==
Summary of the results of the 16 November 2013 election to Old Royal Capital Cetinje City Parliament
Electoral list	Votes	%	Seats
Democratic Party of Socialists	5,165	51.07%	19
Social Democratic Party	1,532	15.15%	5
Positive Montenegro	1,518	15.08%	5
Civic Front	1,071	10.59%	3
Socialist People's Party	386	3.82%	1
Just Montenegro	165	1.63%	0
Rule of Law Movement	141	1.39%	0
Liberal Party	135	1.33%	0

On the election day, ruling Democratic Party of Socialists won the absolute majority (51%) of votes and gained 19 of 33 seats in the City Parliament. Four other lists also gained the seats in the City Parliament.
