= Aleksandar Bogdanović (footballer) =

Serbian footballer

Personal information
- Full name: Александар Богдановић
- Date of birth: 2 August 1973 (age 53)
- Place of birth: Prijepolje, SFR Yugoslavia
- Height: 1.90 m (6 ft 3 in)
- Position: Defender

Senior career*
Years	Team	Apps	(Gls)
1997–1998	Bečej		
1998–2000	Milicionar	12+	(1)
2000–2001	Erzurumspor	5	(1)
2001	Mladost Apatin	5	(2)
2002	Železnik	18	(1)
2003–2007	Javor Ivanjica	124	(6)
- * Club domestic league appearances and goals

Aleksandar Bogdanović (Serbian Cyrillic: Александар Богдановић; born 2 August 1973) is a Serbian retired footballer who played for several clubs in Europe, including FK Železnik and FK Javor Ivanjica in the Serbian SuperLiga and Erzurumspor in Turkey.
