= Đorđe Radulović =

Montenegrin politician (born 1984)

- Ђорђе Радуловић
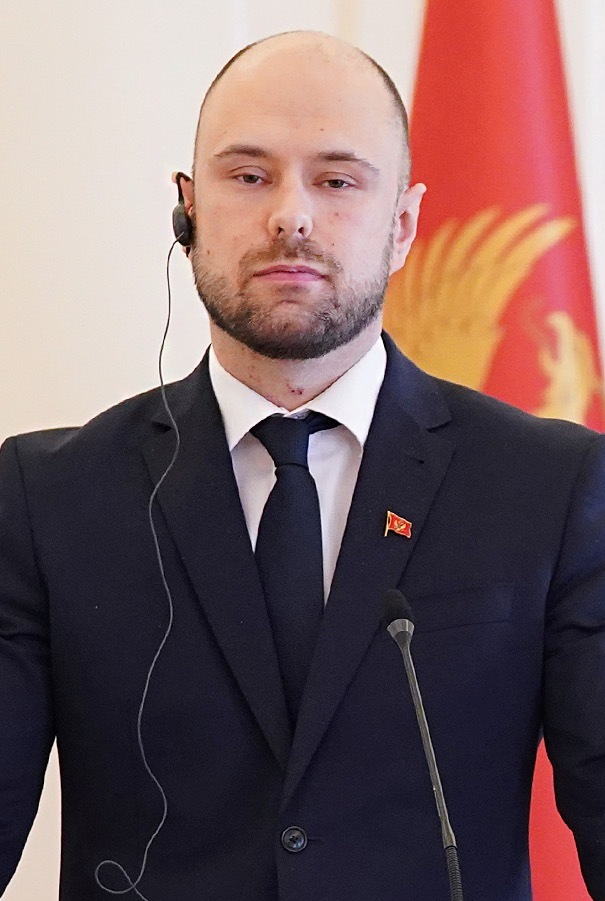
- Radulović in April 2021

Minister of Foreign Affairs
- In office 4 December 2020 – 28 April 2022
- Prime Minister: Zdravko Krivokapić
- Preceded by: Srđan Darmanović
- Succeeded by: Ranko Krivokapić

Personal details
- Born: 31 August 1984 (age 42) Titograd, SFR Yugoslavia (now Podgorica, Montenegro)
- Party: Independent
- Education: University of Montenegro
- Occupation: Diplomat, politician

Đorđe Radulović (Serbian Cyrillic: Ђорђе Радуловић; born 31 August 1984) is a Montenegrin diplomat who served as the minister of foreign affairs in the cabinet of Zdravko Krivokapić from 4 December 2020 to 28 April 2022.

== Biography ==
Radulović was born in 1984 in Titograd (now Podgorica), which was then part of the Socialist Federal Republic of Yugoslavia. He finished high school in Podgorica and graduated from the Faculty of Political Science at the University of Montenegro. From 2010 to 2011, he was employed in the editorial office of the MONDO portal in the field of providing technical web and vap support.

Since 2011, he has been employed in the Ministry of Foreign Affairs, first as an attaché in the Directorate General for Bilateral Affairs, where he performed duties in the Directorate for Neighboring Countries, as well as in the Directorate for Europe and the CIS. From September 2013, at the invitation of the State Secretary for Political Affairs, Ambassador Vladimir Radulović, he took over the duties in his cabinet, in parallel retaining the portfolio from the domain of the General Directorate for Bilateral Affairs.

From 2013 to 2016, he was the Secretary in the Cabinet of the State Secretary for Political Affairs, and from 2017 to 2020, he was the Chargé d'Affaires and then the Deputy Montenegrin Ambassador to Romania.

He was also the director of the Directorate for European Neighborhood Policy in the Ministry of Foreign Affairs, and since 2020 he has been the director of the Directorate for the European Union in the same ministry.

From 2012 to 2014, he was an assistant at the University of Donja Gorica, where he was employed on the recommendation of the Ambassador of Montenegro to Russia, Zoran Jocović, who was a lecturer at the same faculty at that time. Radulović speaks English and Russian and uses German.
