= Ratko Mitrović =

Montenegrin professor and politician

Ratko Mitrović Ратко Митровић
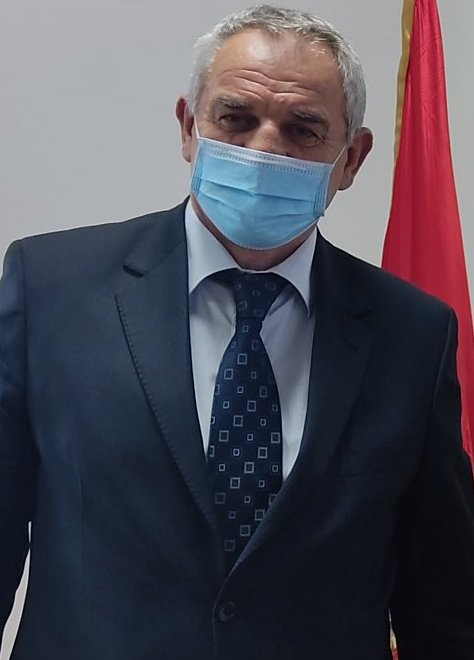
- Ratko Mitrović in December 2020.

Minister of Ecology, Spatial Planning and Urbanism of Montenegro
- In office 4 December 2020 – 28 April 2022
- Prime Minister: Zdravko Krivokapić
- Preceded by: Pavle Radulović (Sustainable Development and Tourism)
- Succeeded by: Ana Novaković Đurović

Personal details
- Born: 1956 (age 69–70) Podgorica, FPR Yugoslavia (now Montenegro)
- Party: Independent
- Other political affiliations: We won't give up Montenegro (2020–present)
- Education: University of Niš; University of Belgrade; University of Novi Sad; University of Florida
- Occupation: Engineer, professor, scientist

Ratko Mitrović (Serbian Cyrillic: Ратко Митровић; born 1956) is a Montenegrin civil engineer, university professor, scientist and government official, serving as Minister of Ecology, Spatial Planning and Urbanism of Montenegro in the cabinet of Zdravko Krivokapić, since December 2020. In addition to his academic career at the University of Montenegro, he is one of the founders of the non-governmental organization called "We won't give up Montenegro" (Ne damo Crnu Goru), which was founded by Montenegrin professors and intellectuals in support of the Serbian Orthodox Church in Montenegro after a controversial religion law targeted the legal status and the property of the Church.

== Early life and education ==
Mitrović was born in 1956 in Podgorica, Montenegro which at the time was a part of the FPR Yugoslavia. He graduated in 1981 at two departments of the University of Niš's Faculty of Architecture and Civil Engineering, the Department of Construction and Design of multi-storey Buildings and the Department of Construction and Design of Infrastructure Buildings. He then enrolled postgraduate studies at the Faculty of Civil Engineering, University of Belgrade, and defended his master's thesis on the topic of improving the technology of prefabricated building systems in 1991. Mitrović received his doctorate in 1994 at the Technical Faculty of the University of Novi Sad's Department of Management and Construction Technologies, defending his doctoral dissertation called "Technical and technological modeling of organizational structures of construction companies in market conditions." During 1997 and 1998, he attended postdoctoral studies at the public University of Florida.

== Career ==
=== Professional career ===
He started his professional career in 1980s as an engineer for the development of new technologies in the General Construction Company in Titograd (now Podgorica), then capital of SR Montenegro of SFR Yugoslavia, where he soon became the head of operations for the construction of high-rise buildings. Then, in 1987, he started working to Montenegro state-owned electricity company (Elektroprivreda Crne Gore) as the chief engineer and construction manager. Between 1991 and 2000, he managed the construction of several residential buildings and cultural institutions in capital Podgorica, as well in several other Montenegrin settlements. He was also the director of the construction of the Serbian Orthodox Cathedral of the Resurrection of Christ in Podgorica, completed in 2013. In recent years, he has been working on research in the field of renewable energy sources. He is the author of dozens of protected conceptual solutions for the hydropower use of watercourses, as well as several protected conceptual solutions for the use of solar energy.

=== Academic career ===
Mitrović is a full professor at the Faculties of Architecture and of Civil Engineering of the University of Montenegro, where he teaches several subjects: Elements of buildings, Technology of construction of hydropower facilities, New technologies and materials, Organization of construction and Project Management. At the Faculty of Architecture, he is the head of the department of master's studies. He was hired as a guest lecturer at few faculties in Serbia, the United Kingdom and in Italy.

=== Political career ===
Mitrović was part of the 2020 religion law protests. He decided to enter political life of Montenegro in mid-2020, at the height of the political crisis in Montenegro, and the open conflict between the Serbian Orthodox Church in Montenegro and the DPS-led Montenegrin government, following the adoption of the disputed law on the status of religious communities in Montenegro, supporting 2019–2020 clerical protests and Serbian Orthodox Church (SPC) rights in Montenegro. In July 2020, together with Zdravko Krivokapić and several other Montenegrin university professors and intellectuals, he was one of the founders of the Church-backed "We won't give up Montenegro" (Ne damo Crnu Goru) NGO and public movement. He was elected the first head of the council of the organization. In a short period of time, the organization organized public events in which Bishop of Budimlja and Nikšić Joanikije (Mićović) and the Rector of the Theological Seminary in Cetinje, Gojko Perović participated, among others. 30 August 2020 election resulted in a victory for the opposition parties and the fall from power of the ruling DPS, which has ruled the country since the introduction of the multi-party system in 1990, while the "Ne damo Crnu Goru" and opposition list leader Krivokapić was selected new prime minister-designate of Montenegro by the new parliamentary majority, announcing withdrawal of the disputed law on religious communities.

On 5 November 2020, the Prime Minister-designate Krivokapić appointed him a candidate for the Minister in newly created post of Minister of Ecology, Spatial Planning and Urbanism in the new government cabinet of Montenegro. Immediately after the announcement of the candidacy for ministerial positions in the new government, several environmental protection organizations and environmental activists demanded the withdrawal of Prime Minister-designate Krivokapic's proposal to nominate Professor Mitrovic as Minister of Ecology, Spatial Planning and Urbanism. They said they were revolted by the proposal for Mitrović to head the ecology ministry in the future cabinet, due to his earlier participation in the design of small hydropower plants on mountain rivers in northern Montenegro, against which environmental activists have been protesting for decades. It was also revealed that he was a co-founder of the company "Renevable Energy Montenegro", which is exclusively engaged in the construction of small hydropower plants, and that Mitrović himself designed more than fifteen small hydropower plants throughout Montenegro. In a statement to the media, Mirović admitted that he had participated in similar projects in the past, but that he completely gave up small hydropower projects in 2010, when he realized how many mini hydropower plants of that type are devastating to the environment, saying that such a model of electricity production unacceptable and that he now completely opposes the construction of mini hydropower plants in Montenegro. On 4 December 2020, the Parliament of Montenegro officially elected him Minister.

In an interview in May 2021, Mitrović admitted in an interview that he had been involved in the construction of an illegal house near Budva for 20 years, of which he was accused of by opposition MPs earlier that year, saying he was no longer the owner but his son. After a controversial interview, the opposition and NGOs demanded Mitrović's resignation from Prime Minister Krivokapić, which he refused to do, saying "Mitrović misunderstood the journalistic issue due to hearing problems and was confused" and that he is necessary part of his government, as a proven expert in his field. Mitrović later said that his statement was "clumsily made" and that his son, who is the owner, had previously submitted a request for the legalization of the house, long before he became minister. The parliamentary opposition and NGOs continued to demand his resignation, calling into question his moral credibility to continue running the urbanism ministry.

== Personal life ==
In addition to his native Serbian, he also speaks English and Russian language. Prime Minister of Montenegro, Zdravko Krivokapić and Mitrović are best men to each other, after the media revelation of that, some media and political circles close to the former DPS-led regime accused Mitrović, Krivokapić and his cabinet of nepotism. His brother Dragan Mitrović is the current steward of the Cathedral of the Resurrection of Christ in Podgorica, which he constructed between 1990s and 2013.
