= Vesna Bratić =

Montenegrin professor and politician

Vesna Bratić Весна Братић

Minister of Education, Science, Culture and Sports of Montenegro
- In office 4 December 2020 – 28 April 2022
- Prime Minister: Zdravko Krivokapić
- Preceded by: Damir Šehović (Education); Sanja Damjanović (Science); Aleksandar Bogdanović (Culture); Nikola Janović (Sports)
- Succeeded by: Miomir Vojinović

Personal details
- Born: 25 May 1977 (age 49) Trebinje, SR Bosnia and Herzegovina, SFR Yugoslavia
- Party: UCG (2023-present)
- Other political affiliations: We won't give up Montenegro (2020–present)
- Education: University of Montenegro; University of Belgrade
- Occupation: Philology professor, politician

Vesna Bratić (Serbian Cyrillic: Весна Братић; born 25 May 1977) is a Montenegrin politician.

== Biography ==
=== Early life and academic career ===
Vesna Bratić was born on 25 May 1977 to a Herzegovinian Serb family in Trebinje which at that time was a part of the Socialist Federal Republic of Yugoslavia. She finished middle and high school in Bileća and graduated in 2000 at the Department of English Language and Literature at the Faculty of Philosophy at the University of Montenegro in Nikšić. She was employed as a teaching associate at the Institute of Foreign Languages in 2003. She received her master's degree in 2007 from the Faculty of Philology at the University of Belgrade, with a thesis in which she developed a comparative analysis of the narrative process of Aleksandar Tišma and William Faulkner.

She received her PhD from the same faculty in 2012 with the thesis Images of America in the Works of Sam Shepard and David Memet. In 2013, she was elected assistant professor at the Faculty of Philosophy, University of Montenegro in Nikšić. She was elected associate professor in 2018. In parallel, she teaches English at the Faculty of Electrical Engineering in Montenegrin capital Podgorica, at the same university. She received Montenegrin citizenship in 2012.

=== Political career ===
She was one of the founders of the non-governmental organization "We won't give up Montenegro" (Не дамо Црну Гору / Ne damo Crnu Goru), which was founded in July 2020 by university professors in Montenegro and headed by Zdravko Krivokapić. She succeeded Krivokapic as president of the NGO, after he was elected leader of the opposition list for the August 2020 parliamentary election. On 4 December 2020, the Parliament of Montenegro elected her Minister of Education, Science, Culture and Sports in the Government of Montenegro and the cabinet of Zdravko Krivokapić.

== Political views and controversies ==
Vesna Bratić is a self-declared Serbian nationalist:

A man said to me: You are a Serbian nationalist, as if it were an insult. I am. I am a nationalist. Serbian. I won't be a Belgian one. It just means I love my people.
