= Milutin Simović =

Montenegrin politician (born 1961)

Milutin Simović (Montenegrin Cyrillic: Милутин Симовић; born 1961 in Nikšić, Yugoslavia) is a Montenegrin politician, member of the Democratic Party of Socialists (DPS), former Deputy Prime Minister of Montenegro from November 2016 until 2020, and former mayor of Nikšić Municipality, from November 2020 to local election held in 2021.

Simović graduated and obtained a master's degree at the University of Novi Sad, Faculty of Agriculture in 1988. He was a long-term Minister of Agriculture and Rural development in several DPS-led governments, from 1997 until 2010, and again from 2016 until 2020, when he also served as Deputy PM and the head of the national Coronavirus control body, during the 2020 COVID-19 health crisis. Simović also served as one of vice-presidents of the Parliament of Montenegro from 2012 until 2016.
