= Civis (Montenegro) =

Political party in Montenegro

Civis Цивис
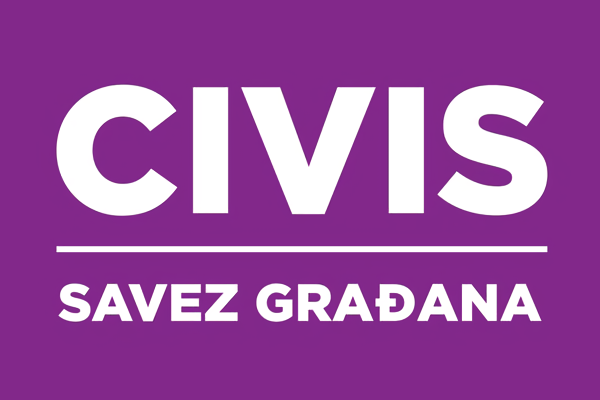
- Leader: Srđan Pavićević
- Founded: April 2019 (as an NGO); September 2020 (party)
- Split from: DEMOS
- Headquarters: Podgorica
- Ideology: Liberalism; Anti-corruption; Technocracy; Minority rights; Secularism; Anti-nationalism; Pro-Europeanism
- Political position: Centre to centre-left
- Parliament: 1 / 81
- Mayors: 0 / 25
- Local Parliaments: 1 / 844

The Citizens' Union "Civis" (Montenegrin: Savez građana "Civis" / Савез грађана "Цивис"), commonly known as simply as Civis (Cyrillic: Цивис), is a minor liberal and pro-European political party in Montenegro formed in 2020 from the non-governmental organization of the same name. Its founder and current leader is Srđan Pavićević, a surgeon and civic activist, who is also serving as the party's single representative in the Parliament of Montenegro, elected from the list of United Reform Action at the August 2020 parliamentary election.

== History ==
The Civis was founded in April 2019 in Podgorica, as a political non-governmental organization, by group of Montenegrin civic activists, gathered around Srđan "Srđa" Pavićević, a surgeon and human rights activist. Civis was part of 2019 Montenegrin anti-corruption protests. Since its establishment, the organization cooperated closely with the parliamentary party United Reform Action, whose members were many of the founders of the organization. The political positions of Civis since its foundation are based on liberalism, europeanism, anti-corruption, technocracy and minority rights politics. At the 2020 parliamentary election Civis was part of the United Reform Action-led In Black and White electoral list. The list won 4 parliamentary seats at the election, one of which belonged to Civis.

== Electoral performance ==
=== Parliamentary elections ===
Election	Party leader	Performance				Alliance	Government
Election	Party leader	Votes	%	Seats	+/–	Alliance	Government
2020	Srđan Pavićević	22,679	5.54%	1 / 81	New	CnB	Support 2020–22
2020	Srđan Pavićević	22,679	5.54%	1 / 81	New	CnB	Coalition 2022–23
2023	Srđan Pavićević	77,203	25.53%	1 / 81	0	PES–UCG–Civis	Coalition 2023–24
2023	Srđan Pavićević	77,203	25.53%	1 / 81	0	PES–UCG–Civis	Support 2024–

After the election, Civis and URA continued their cooperation as part of the same parliamentary group.
