= Milka Tadić =

Montenegrin journalist, media executive and civic activist

Milka Tadić, or Milka Tadić Mijović, is a Montenegrin journalist, media executive, and civic activist. She holds a master's degree in political science and journalism from University of Montenegro, and a bachelor's degree in political science from the University of Belgrade.

== Biography ==
Milka Tadić Mijović was one of the co-founders and the executive director of Monitor, the first private independent weekly established in Montenegro in 1990. That same year, she was also one of the founders of the multi-ethnic, reform oriented organization Association for the Yugoslav Democratic Initiative (UJDI). Tadić Mijović was the first journalist in Montenegro dismissed from job for criticizing Slobodan Milošević's nationalistic policies.

During the nineties, she was actively engaged in the anti-war movement. Her wartime reports, analytical columns and radio and TV interviews, as well as investigative articles on organised crime and corruption in Montenegro and the region have been translated and published or quoted by leading international media.

== Affiliations ==
She has served on the Council of Europe Steering Committee on the Mass Media and as member of the Open Society Foundations Board in Montenegro; Joint Commission on Media Policy of the Duke University & City of Vienna; and member of Board of the Courrier des Balcans.

Milka Tadic Mijovic is president and journalist of the Centre for Investigative Journalism of Montenegro since 2016. Her investigative reporting articles exposing abuse of power, high-level corruption and destruction of nature have earned her both numerous threats and journalistic excellence awards. Reporters Without Borders included her in their first ever list of '100 Information Heroes' in 2014.
