= Krivokapić Cabinet =

Government of Montenegro

- 42nd Cabinet of Montenegro
- 2020–2022
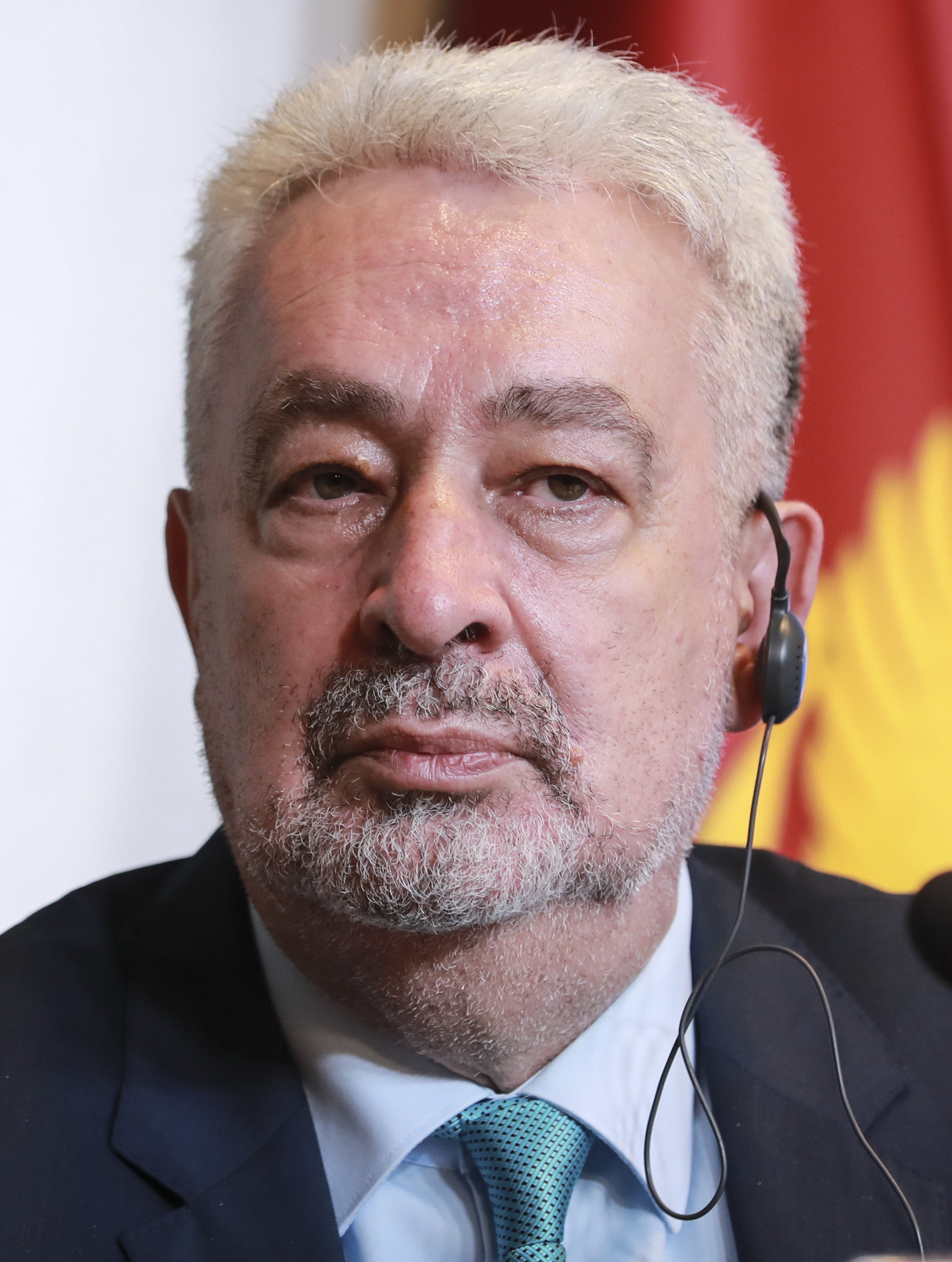
- Date formed: December 4, 2020
- Date dissolved: April 28, 2022

People and organisations
- Head of government: Zdravko Krivokapić
- No. of ministers: 13 (including Deputy PM)
- Member parties: NDCG(ZBCG), URA with ZBCG, CIVIS and MNN support
- Status in legislature: Technocratic cabinet and Minority government

History
- Election: 30 August 2020
- Predecessor: Marković Cabinet
- Successor: Abazović Cabinet

The Krivokapić Cabinet was the 42nd cabinet of Montenegro. It was elected on 4 December 2020 by a majority vote in the parliament. The technocratic government was composed of URA, independents, NDCG (ZBCG) and was supported by the three parliamentary groups; Democratic Front/For the Future of Montenegro (NSD, DNP, PzP, PCG, UCG and RP), Peace is Our Nation (DCG and Demos), Socialist People's Party.

== Government formation ==
=== 2020 election ===
The election resulted in a victory for the opposition parties and the fall from power of the ruling DPS, which had ruled the country since the introduction of the multi-party system in 1990.

On 31 August, the leaders of three opposition coalitions, For the Future of Montenegro, Peace is Our Nation and In Black and White, agreed to form an expert government, and to continue to work on the European Union accession process.

=== Forming majority ===
On September 23, all 41 deputies of the three coalitions of the new majority in parliament officially supported Zdravko Krivokapić as the prime minister-designate, as well as electing Aleksa Bečić new President of the Parliament. On 30 September, Krivokapić started initial talks with representatives of the parties of the three coalitions, which formed the parliamentary majority in Montenegro about forming the new government. On 8 October, Krivokapić formally became the Prime Minister-designate after the President Đukanović has given him a mandate to form the new government.

On October 30, designate Krivokapić held a meeting with the leaders of parties of the new parliamentary majority, who confirmed the support of their parties of the new majority for Krivokapić's concept of an expert government, composed by independent candidates. On November 5, the composition of the new government was officially presented, in which the number of ministers in the government will be reduced to 12 due to the rationalization of the state administration, which is 8 less than in the previous cabinet, which is why some departments were merged and some abolished. According to the final agreement of the supporting parties, the new government will be limited to one year, with the main goals; the fight against corruption and the depoliticization of public institutions after 30 years of DPS rule, as well as the reform of electoral laws, due to the preparation of an atmosphere for holding a new, "first fairly organized" elections in Montenegro.

On 4 December 2020, the new cabinet was elected by 41 out of 81 members of the Parliament of Montenegro, with the support of Democratic Montenegro, New Serb Democracy, Democratic People's Party, Movement for Changes, Socialist People's Party, United Reform Action, Democratic Alliance, True Montenegro, United Montenegro and the Workers' Party.

Investiture votes for Krivokapić Cabinet
Ballot →	2 December 2020
Required majority →	41 out of 81
Yes: • DF (20); • MNN (10); • SNP (5); • CnB (4); • UCG (1); • Prava (1)	41 / 81
Abstinent: • Forca (1)	1 / 81
No: • DPS-LP (20); • SD (3); • BS (3); • SDP (1); • PD/DP (1)	28 / 81
Absentees: • DPS (10); • SDP (1)	11 / 81

== Cabinet composition ==
=== Affiliation breakdown ===
- ZBCG - NGO Ne damo Crnu Goru 7
  7
- Crno na bijelo 4 (URA 1)
  4
- Independents/None 3
  3

=== Cabinet members ===
Portfolio	Minister	Party	Aff.	Took office
Prime Minister
General Affairs	Zdravko Krivokapić	none	NDCG	4 December 2020
Deputy Prime Minister
National Security	Dritan Abazović	URA	CnB	4 December 2020
Ministers
Justice, Human and Minority Rights (Note: After Leposavić's dismissal on 17 June 2021, the ministry was temporarily headed by PM Krivokapić until 1 July, then by Interior Minister Sergej Sekulović (CnB) until his removal from the post on 24 January 2022, when Krivokapić took over acting once again.)	Vladimir Leposavić	none	none	4 December 2020
Public Administration, Digital Society and Media	Tamara Srzentić	none	none	4 December 2020
Foreign Affairs	Đorđe Radulović	none	CnB	4 December 2020
Internal Affairs	Sergej Sekulović	none	CnB	4 December 2020
Defence	Olivera Injac	none	CnB	4 December 2020
Education, Science, Culture and Sports	Vesna Bratić	none	NDCG	4 December 2020
Finance and Social Welfare	Milojko Spajić	none	NDCG	4 December 2020
Economic Development	Jakov Milatović	none	NDCG	4 December 2020
Capital Investments	Mladen Bojanić	none	none	4 December 2020
Health	Jelena Borovinić	none	NDCG	4 December 2020
Ecology, Spatial Planning and Urbanism	Ratko Mitrović	none	NDCG	4 December 2020
Agriculture, Forestry and Water Management	Aleksandar Stijović	none	NDCG	4 December 2020
