= Sergej Sekulović =

Montenegrin lawyer and politician

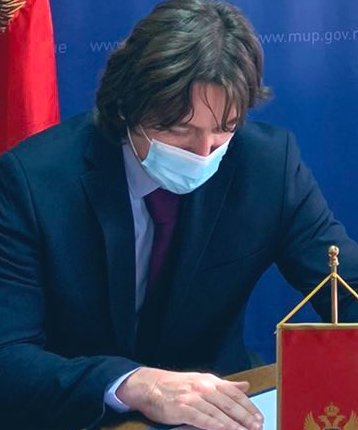
Sekulović in 2021

Sergej Sekulović (Montenegrin Cyrillic: Сергеј Секуловић; born 1978 in Titograd) is a Montenegrin lawyer and independent politician, who served as the Minister of Internal Affairs in the Government of Montenegro and the cabinet of Zdravko Krivokapić from 4 December 2020 to 28 April 2022, he replaced Mevludin Nuhodžić of the Democratic Party of Socialists.

== Biography ==
He has a master's degree in human rights and is a civic activist. He served as a legal advisor to the President of the Parliament of Montenegro Ranko Krivokapić and also was an advisor to the Minister of Labor and Social Welfare Boris Marić in the provisional government in 2016, and previously a member of the centre-right Movement for Changes (PzP) of Nebojša Medojević until his removal from the party in 2010. From July 2021 to April 2022, he served as acting Minister of Justice and Human and Minority Rights of Montenegro.
