= United Reform Action =

Political party in Montenegro

United Reform Action Ujedinjena reformska akcija Уједињена реформска акција
- Abbreviation: URA
- President: Dritan Abazović
- Founder: Žarko Rakčević
- Founded: 14 March 2015
- Split from: Positive Montenegro
- Headquarters: Podgorica
- Ideology: Green liberalism; Social liberalism; Progressivism; Pro-Europeanism
- Political position: Centre to centre-left
- European affiliation: European Green Party
- International affiliation: Global Greens (associate member)
- Colours: Green, purple, navy
- Parliament: 4 / 81
- Mayors: 0 / 25
- Local Parliaments: 27 / 844

Website
- www.ura.org.me

The Civic Movement United Reform Action (Montenegrin: Građanski pokret Ujedinjena reformska akcija / Грађански покрет Уједињена реформска акција), commonly known as simply United Reform Action (URA), is a green, socially liberal, and pro-European party in Montenegro. The current party leader is former Prime Minister Dritan Abazović.

== History ==
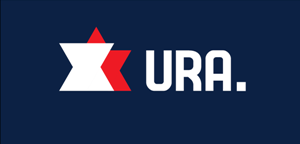
Initial United Reform Action logo with an hourglass symbol used until July 2021

Founded in March 2015 by Žarko Rakčević, a civil engineer and former member and president of Social Democratic Party, before the 2016 parliamentary election URA had two MPs in the Parliament of Montenegro: Dritan Abazović and Miloš Konatar, both elected in 2012 from the electoral list of Positive Montenegro.

In September 2016, URA decided to enter the Key Coalition with Demos and SNP in order to participate at the forthcoming parliamentary election. The Key Coalition won 11.05% of votes and 9 seats, two of them being won by URA candidates. In 2017, Dritan Abazović was elected as the new party leader.

On 13 June 2020, the Civic Movement URA was officially admitted to the European Greens. URA decided to run independently at the 2020 parliamentary election, presenting its green politics and anti-corruption In Black and White" election platform, led by independent candidates, including well known journalist and activist Milka Tadić, some university professors, journalists, civic and NGO activists, with the party leader Dritan Abazović as a ballot carrier. URA electoral list also contains one representative of the Bosniak minority Justice and Reconciliation Party, as well of some minor localist parties and initiatives.

On 4 December 2020, the new big tent cabinet of Montenegro was elected by 41 out of 81 members of the Parliament of Montenegro, and independent candidate Zdravko Krivokapić became the new Prime Minister of Montenegro, with the Civic Movement URA leader Dritan Abazović as new Deputy Prime Minister, formally ending three decades of the Milo Đukanović's DPS-led regime in Montenegro.

== Electoral performance ==
=== Parliamentary elections ===
Election	Party leader	Performance				Alliance	Government
Election	Party leader	Votes	%	Seats	+/–	Alliance	Government
2016	Dritan Abazović	42,295	11.05%	2 / 81	New	Ključ	Opposition
2020	Dritan Abazović	22,679	5.54%	3 / 81	▲1	CnB	Government
2023	Dritan Abazović	37,730	12.48%	4 / 81	▲1	HSB	Opposition

=== Presidential elections ===
President of Montenegro
Year	Candidate		1st round votes	% of votes	2nd round votes	% of votes
2018	Mladen Bojanić^{[a]}	2nd	111,711	33.40%	—	—

^{a} Independent candidate, support
