= 1998 Montenegrin parliamentary election =

← 1996	31 May 1998	2001 →
Party	Leader	Vote %	Seats	+/–
DŽB	Milo Đukanović	49.54	42	−19
SNP	Momir Bulatović	36.10	29	New
LSCG	Slavko Perović	6.29	5	−4
DSCG	Mehmet Bardhi	1.58	1	−1
UDSH	Fuad Nimani	1.03	1	−1
This lists parties that won seats. See the complete results below.
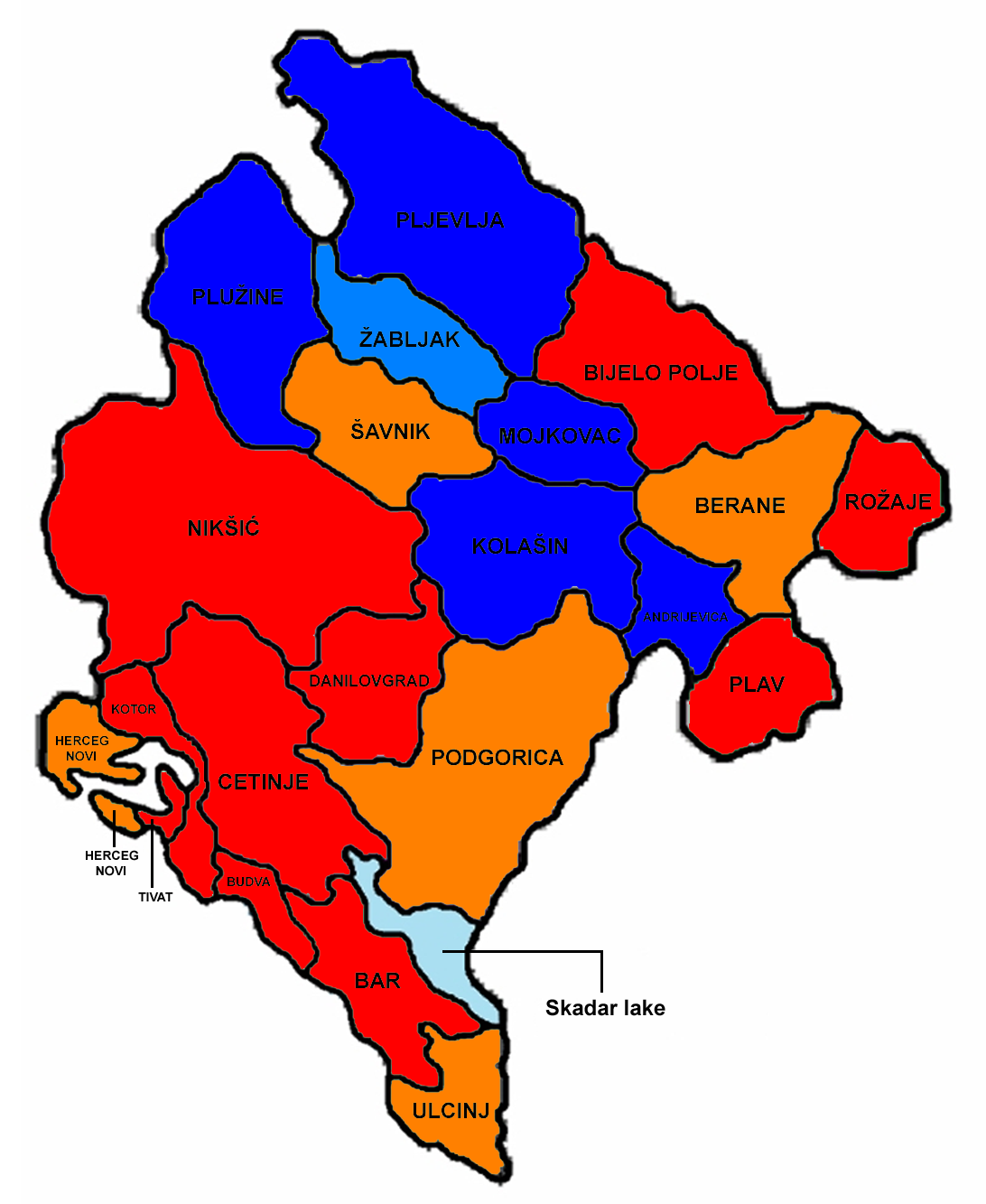
Most voted-for party by municipality
DŽB majority DŽB plurality SNP majority SNP plurality
Prime Minister before	Prime Minister after
Milo Đukanović; DPS	Filip Vujanović; DPS

Parliamentary elections were held in Montenegro on 31 May 1998. The result was a victory for the So that we live better coalition formed by the Democratic Party of Socialists of Montenegro, Social Democratic Party of Montenegro and the People's Party of Montenegro which won 42 of the 78 seats.

== Electoral system ==
Of the 78 seats in Parliament, 76 were elected by proportional representation in a nationwide constituency and two were elected in a special constituency for the Albanian minority. The electoral threshold was set at 3% and seats allocated using the d'Hondt method. Closed lists were used with a single list for both constituencies, although parties only had to award half their seats according to the order of the list, with the remaining half free for them to allocate.

== Contesting parties ==
Name		Abbreviation	Main ideology	Leader
So that We live Better; Da živimo bolje Да живимо боље	Democratic Party of Socialists; Demokratska partija socijalista Демократска партија социјалиста	DPS	Social democracy Catch-all	Milica Pejanović
So that We live Better; Da živimo bolje Да живимо боље	Social Democratic Party; Socijaldemokratska partija Социјалдемократска партија	SDP	Social democracy Separatism	Žarko Rakčević
So that We live Better; Da živimo bolje Да живимо боље	People's Party; Narodna stranka Народна странка	NS	Conservatism; Unionism	Novak Kilibarda
Socialist People's Party; Socijalistička narodna partija Социјалистичка народна партија		SNP	Social democracy Unionism	Momir Bulatović
Liberal Alliance of Montenegro; Liberalni savez Crne Gore; Либерални савез Црне Горе		LSCG	Liberalism; Separatism	Slavko Perović
Democratic League in Montenegro; Demokratski savez u Crnoj Gori; Lidhja Demokratike në Mal të Zi		DS	Albanian minority interests Liberal conservativism	Mehmet Bardhi
Democratic Union of Albanians; Demokratska unija Albanaca; Unioni Demokratik i Shqipëtarëve		DUA	Albanian minority interests Social conservatism	Fuad Nimani

=== Split in the Democratic Party of Socialists ===
In the late 1990s a rift inside the ruling Democratic Party of Socialists of Montenegro came out. On the 1997 Montenegrin presidential election, aside then's President of the Republic and the Party Momir Bulatović, the Premier of Montenegro and party's vice-president Milo Đukanović ran too, leading a reforming wing opposing mainstream DPS CG's political attitudes regarding support of Serbian president Slobodan Milošević. The ruling parties of the Republic of Serbia (the constitutive partner of the Federal Republic of Yugoslavia like the Republic of Montenegro), SPS and SRS, have soundly and firmly stood on Momir's side, while the opposition in Serbia (SPO, DS, DSS and GS) gave their support in Milo. It is so that the Democratic Party of Socialists - Momir Bulatović had officially seceded from the other branch of the DPS CG, but Momir's supports had only retained majority in 5 municipalities of Montenegro, while the other 16 in which DPS reigned voiced their support of Milo.

Momir presented in the political campaign that his main goal was the preservation of FRY and the maintaining of the present political status in Montenegro. In the first round on 5 October 1997 Momir Bulatović won receiving most votes, 147,615 or 47.45%, but lost to opposing Milo the second round on 19 October 1997 when he won 169,257 or only 49.2%. Momir refused to recognize the results, calling them unrealistic and forged - considering that every single of the other candidates that ran in the first circle voiced their support in Momir in the second. One of the main controversial moments, as criticized by OEBS, is that Milo as Premier, managed to seize control of the Montenegrin national media (e.g. TV CG). On the other side, the Serbian national media had also been unbalanced, promoting Momir. The other unbalancing issue is that Milo, as Premier, was in a much stronger position to further his personal goals, controlling the government (the President had very little authority in effect) and had seized control over most of DPS' local authorities, while DPS - Momir Bulatović got only 5 of total DPS' 21. On the other hand, Momir enjoyed the support of Serbia and the Federal Yugoslav government itself. With the huge clashes between Momir and Milo, the election respected minimal democratic standards. However, with eventual loss at the election, the rift between the two wings was final.

=== So that We live Better coalition ===
Following the internal turmoil within the DPS during late 1996 and early 1997 when the party's most prominent members Milo Đukanović and Momir Bulatović bitterly fought behind the scenes for the control of the party, Đukanović emerged as the clear winner of the year-long power struggle. Under his leadership, DPS began entering pre-election alliances with smaller parties under the coalition banner that had a different name ahead of each parliamentary elections.

Đukanović-led DPS called for an alliance between anti-Milošević parties, stating that Milošević's political pursuits were leading FR Yugoslavia into ruin. It made a coalition with the Social Democratic Party of Montenegro (SDP) that supported outright independence and the People's Party of Montenegro (NS) that wanted Montenegro to remain in a state with Serbia. DPS's own position at the time was that Montenegro and Serbia should be in a single unified state, but they opposed Milošević's rule.

The 1998 parliamentary election on May 31 essentially turned into another showdown between Đukanović and Bulatović over a single issue - Slobodan Milošević. Đukanović's coalition won, seizing 42 of 78 total parliamentary seats. Those 42 seats were then divided up three ways according to the coalition agreement: DPS received 32 seats while its coalition partners NS and SDP got 5 each.

=== Liberal Alliance of Montenegro ===
At the 1997 presidential election, LSCG did not table its candidate. However, in the second round the party supported Milo Đukanović over Momir Bulatović, in order to send a message that they are not against the West which supported Đukanović's candidacy. At the Montenegrin parliamentary election, 1998, LSCG won 6,21%, or a little more than 20,000 votes, and 5 seats in the Montenegrin parliament. LSCG lost a significant number of voters due to change of policy of DPS, which gradually started supporting the independence of Montenegro, attracting a portion of their voters. Due to poor electoral result, Perović resigned from his post. At the party electoral convention, held on 23 and 24 January 1999, Miodrag Živković officially became the new political leader of LSCG.

== Results ==
Party	Votes	%	Seats	+/–
So that We Live Better	170,080	49.54	42	–19
Socialist People's Party of Montenegro	123,957	36.10	29	New
Liberal Alliance of Montenegro	21,612	6.29	5	–4
Serb People's Party	6,606	1.92	0	New
Democratic League in Montenegro	5,425	1.58	1	–1
Serbian Radical Party	4,060	1.18	0	0
Democratic Union of Albanians	3,529	1.03	1	–1
Party of Democratic Action of Montenegro	1,996	0.58	0	–3
Communists of Montenegro	1,885	0.55	0	0
"For Serbdom"	1,299	0.38	0	New
Serbian People's Radical Party	761	0.22	0	New
Natural Law Party of Montenegro	611	0.18	0	0
List of Unified Bosniaks – Muslims in Montenegro	419	0.12	0	New
Party of Foreign Currency Savers of Montenegro	371	0.11	0	New
Yugoslav United Left in Montenegro	345	0.10	0	New
Party of Protection of Savings and Social Security	199	0.06	0	0
Party of Human Way	195	0.06	0	New
Total	343,350	100.00	78	+7
Valid votes	343,350	98.67		
Invalid/blank votes	4,635	1.33		
Total votes	347,985	100.00		
Registered voters/turnout	457,633	76.04		
