= 1992–93 Montenegrin general election =

General election held in Montenegro, FR Yugoslavia

- Presidential election
← 1990	20 December 1992 (first round); 10 January 1993 (second round)	1997 →
- Turnout: 68.95% (first round); 59.11% (second round)
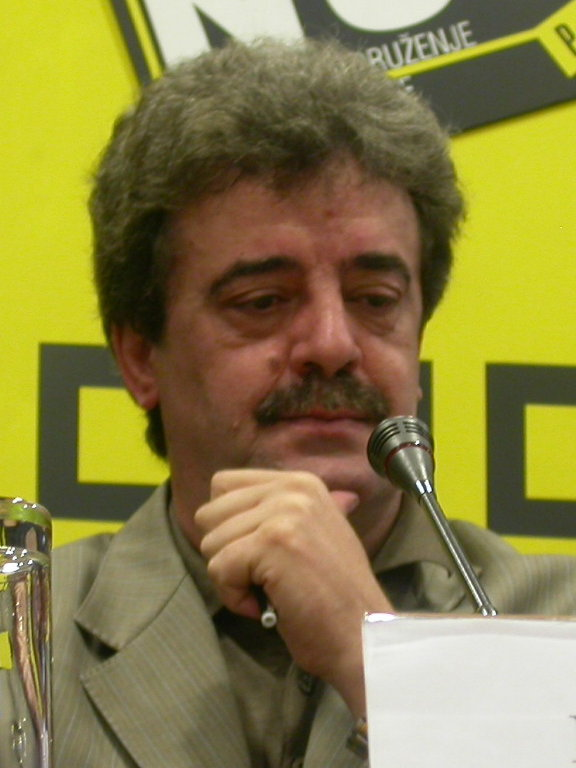

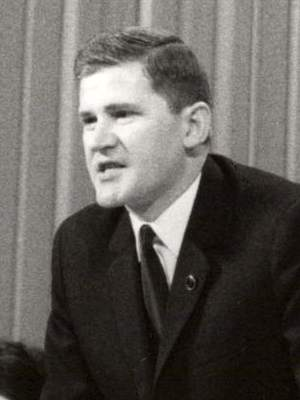
Candidate	Momir Bulatović	Branko Kostić
Party	DPS	Independent
Popular vote	158,722	92,045
Percentage	63.29%	36.71%
President before election
Momir Bulatović
DPS
Elected President
Momir Bulatović
DPS
- Parliamentary election
← 1990	20 December 1992	1996 →
Party	Leader	Vote %	Seats	+/–
DPS	Momir Bulatović	43.78	46	−37
NS	Novak Kilibarda	13.08	14	+1
LSCG	Slavko Perović	12.40	13	New
SRS	Duško Sekulić	7.76	8	New
SDPR	Miodrag Marović	4.53	4	New
This lists parties that won seats. See the complete results below.
Prime Minister before	Prime Minister after
Milo Đukanović; DPS	Milo Đukanović; DPS

General elections were held in Montenegro, at the time a constituent republic of Yugoslavia, on 20 December 1992. A second round of the presidential election was held on 10 January 1993. The elections were seen as a referendum on independence for Montenegro, and were won by then Serbian-Montenegrin unionist centre-left Democratic Party of Socialists of Montenegro (DPS) who also favoured greater autonomy within federation with Serbia. The presidential elections were won by the DPS leader Momir Bulatović, who received 63% of the vote in the second round. The result of the parliamentary elections was a victory for the Democratic Party of Socialists which succeed ruling League of Communists. DPS won 46 of the 85 seats.

== Background ==
The breakup of Yugoslavia drew new boundaries in the Montenegrin political scene. The League of Communists of Montenegro formally changed their identity, renaming themselves the Democratic Party of Socialists. After the president of DPS, Momir Bulatović, initially showed support for Carrington's 1991 peace plan, he was summoned to Belgrade by Borisav Jović and Slobodan Milošević, who persuaded him to reverse his commitment to Carrington. As a result, Bulatović no longer pursued Montenegrin independence under the Carrington model and agreed to holding an independence referendum in 1992. Although there was a boycott among those who wanted independence, Montenegrin voters chose to remain within Yugoslavia. Even so, Bulatović's brief support for the Carrington plan deeply shook Milošević's confidence in him as a political ally. Milošević ultimately supported Branko Kostić, also from DPS, ahead of the presidential election in 1993.

== Results ==
=== National Assembly ===
Party	Votes	%	Seats	+/–
Democratic Party of Socialists of Montenegro	125,578	43.78	46	–37
People's Party	37,532	13.08	14	+1
Liberal Alliance of Montenegro	35,564	12.40	13	New
Serbian Radical Party in Montenegro	22,265	7.76	8	New
Social Democratic Party of Reformists	12,994	4.53	4	New
Democratic League in Montenegro	11,388	3.97	0	–5
Socialist Party of Montenegro	8,412	2.93	0	New
Democratic Opposition (Note: The Democratic Party, the People's Democratic Party, the Democratic Alliance of Independent Entrepreneurs and the Serbian Democratic Party)	7,828	2.73	0	–
League of Communists – Movement for Yugoslavia	6,236	2.17	0	New
Association of Fighters '91–'92	4,198	1.46	0	New
Serbian National Renewal for Montenegro and Herzegovina	3,894	1.36	0	New
Demo-Christian (Orthodox) Party	2,478	0.86	0	0
Ecological Movement of Montenegro	2,020	0.70	0	New
Communist Party of Yugoslavia in Montenegro	1,930	0.67	0	0
Social Democratic Party of Montenegro	1,211	0.42	0	New
New Communist Movement of Yugoslavia	1,089	0.38	0	New
Serbian Fatherland Movement	960	0.33	0	New
Democratic Left–Humanism and Technical Progress	703	0.25	0	New
Montenegrin Federalist Movement – Cetinje	559	0.19	0	0
Total	286,839	100.00	85	–40
Registered voters/turnout	429,047	–		
Source: Slavic-Eurasian Research Centre, Goati

=== President ===
Candidate	Party	First round		Second round	
Candidate	Party	Votes	%	Votes	%
Momir Bulatović	Democratic Party of Socialists of Montenegro	123,183	42.82	158,722	63.29
Branko Kostić	Independent	68,296	23.74	92,045	36.71
Slavko Perović	Liberal Alliance of Montenegro	52,736	18.33		
Novak Kilibarda	People's Party	25,979	9.03		
Dragan Hajduković	Independent	10,270	3.57		
Slobodan Vujošević	Democratic Party	2,770	0.96		
Veselin Kaluđerović	Independent	1,606	0.56		
Predrag Popović	Demo-Christian (Orthodox) Party	1,419	0.49		
Živojin Kiro Radović	Serbian National Renewal for Montenegro and Herzegovina	1,399	0.49		
Total		287,658	100.00	250,767	100.00
Valid votes		287,658	97.24	250,767	98.87
Invalid/blank votes		8,150	2.76	2,863	1.13
Total votes		295,808	100.00	253,630	100.00
Registered voters/turnout		429,047	68.95	429,047	59.11
Source: Slavic-Eurasian Research Centre

== Aftermath ==
Shortly after the elections, the Social Democratic Party of Reformists (SDPR) merged with the Socialist Party of Montenegro to form the Social Democratic Party (SDP). The four SDPR MPs formed the newly-formed SDP parliamentary group.

== Bibliography ==
- Morrison, Kenneth (2009). Nationalism, Identity and Statehood in Post-Yugoslav Montenegro. London: I.B. Tauris & Co Ltd. ISBN 978-1-84511-710-8.
