= Miroslav Vicković =

Miro Vicković Миро Вицковић

Leader of Liberal Alliance of Montenegro
- In office 1999–2002
- Preceded by: Slavko Perović
- Succeeded by: Miodrag Živković

Member of Parliament
- In office 3 November 1996 – 9 June 2004

Personal details
- Born: 27 May 1951 Cetinje, Montenegro, Yugoslavia
- Died: 9 June 2004 (aged 53) Podgorica, Montenegro, Serbia and Montenegro
- Party: Liberal Alliance of Montenegro (1992-2004)
- Education: University of Montenegro
- Profession: Politician

Miroslav "Miro" Vicković (Serbian Cyrillic: Мирослав "Миро" Вицковић; 27 May 1951 - 9 June 2004) was a Montenegrin politician and high-ranking official of the Liberal Alliance of Montenegro (LSCG).

== Early life ==
=== Early life and education ===
His father Mihailo was a sublieutenant in the Army of Montenegro, opponent of the annexion of Kingdom of Montenegro in 1918 and participant of the Christmas Uprising in 1919. He was a deputy at the Second session of the AVNOJ, first Minister of Health of Montenegro and first post-World War II Mayor of Cetinje. His mother Anđa (née Vrbica) died when he was two years old.

Vicković finished high school in Cetinje, before graduating from the Faculty of Law in Podgorica. He worked in the Secretariat of Internal Affairs of Montenegro from 1977 to 1990, advancing to the position of the Chief of Minister's cabinet. He resigned from the post following the AB revolution, unwilling to serve to Slobodan Milošević and his subordinates in Montenegro.

=== Political career ===
Vicković started his political career as a deputy of Liberal Alliance of Montenegro (LSCG) in the Podgorica Municipal Assembly (1992–1996). In March 1995, he was appointed as executive director of LSCG. He was elected to the Parliament of Montenegro in 1996, 1998, 2001 and 2002, while also serving as leader of the LSCG parliamentary group. He was elected President of LSCG in 1999, and reelected to the position again in 2002. In the same year, he was elected as Mayor of Cetinje. He died in Podgorica in 2004 after a short disease.

== Personal life ==
Miroslav Vicković was married and had two daughters, Milica and Marija, and son Mirko.

== See also ==
- Liberalism in Montenegro
