= 1996 Montenegrin parliamentary election =

Parliamentary election held in Montenegro, FR Yugoslavia

← 1992	3 November 1996	1998 →
Party	Leader	Vote %	Seats	+/–
DPS	Momir Bulatović	51.24	45	−1
Unity	Novak Kilibarda	25.57	19	−8
SDA CG	Harun Hadžić	3.47	3	New
DSCG	Mehmet Bardhi	1.80	2	+2
UDSH	Fuad Nimani	1.31	2	New
This lists parties that won seats. See the complete results below.
Prime Minister before	Prime Minister after
Milo Đukanović; DPS	Milo Đukanović; DPS

Parliamentary elections were held in Montenegro, at the time a constituent republic of Federal Republic of Yugoslavia on November 3, 1996, the same day as the first round of the 1996 Serbian local elections. The result was a victory for the ruling Democratic Party of Socialists which won 45 of the 71 seats.

== Electoral system ==
Of the 71 seats in Parliament, 64 were elected by proportional representation in a nationwide constituency and seven were elected in a special constituency for minority lists. The electoral threshold was set at 6% and seats allocated using the d'Hondt method. Closed lists were used with a single list for both constituencies, although parties only had to award half their seats according to the order of the list, with the remaining half free for them to allocate.

== Contesting parties ==
Party or alliance		Abbreviation	Main ideology	Leader
Democratic Party of Socialists; Demokratska partija socijalista Демократска партија социјалиста		DPS	Social democracy Serbian–Montenegrin unionism	Momir Bulatović
Popular Unity; Narodna Sloga; Народна Слога	People's Party; Narodna stranka Народна странка	NS	Conservatism; Serbian–Montenegrin unionism	Novak Kilibarda
Popular Unity; Narodna Sloga; Народна Слога	Liberal Alliance of Montenegro; Liberalni savez Crne Gore; Либерални савез Црне Горе	LSCG	Liberalism; Montenegrin nationalism	Slavko Perović
Party of Democratic Action of Montenegro; Stranka Demokratske Akcije; Странка демократске акције		SDA CG	Bosniak nationalism Social conservatism	Harun Hadžić
Democratic League in Montenegro; Demokratski savez u Crnoj Gori; Lidhja Demokratike në Mal të Zi		DS	Albanian minority interests Liberal conservatism	Mehmet Bardhi
Democratic Union of Albanians; Demokratska unija Albanaca; Unioni Demokratik i Shqipëtarëve		DUA	Albanian minority interests Social conservatism	Fuad Nimani

== Results ==
Party	Votes	%	Seats	+/–
Democratic Party of Socialists of Montenegro	150,237	51.24	45	–1
Popular Unity (NS–LSCG)	74,963	25.57	19	–8
Social Democratic Party of Montenegro	16,608	5.66	0	–4
Serbian Radical Party	12,963	4.42	0	–8
Party of Democratic Action of Montenegro	10,167	3.47	3	New
Serb Union (SSS–SSJ)	5,848	1.99	0	New
Democratic League in Montenegro	5,289	1.80	2	+2
Communists of Montenegro (SKPJ–SKCG–DKP–NKPJ)	5,176	1.77	0	0
Democratic Union of Albanians	3,849	1.31	2	New
Communist Party of Yugoslavia in Montenegro	1,728	0.59	0	0
Yugoslav United Left	1,668	0.57	0	New
Serbian Democratic Party of Montenegro	1,603	0.55	0	New
Serbian Radical Party of Montenegro	861	0.29	0	New
Ecological Movement of Montenegro	711	0.24	0	0
Natural Law Party of Montenegro	452	0.15	0	New
Demo-Christian (Orthodox) Party	446	0.15	0	0
Party for Protection of Savings of Montenegro	380	0.13	0	New
Party of National Equality	214	0.07	0	New
Seventh Force	16	0.01	0	New
Union of Social Justice	5	0.00	0	New
Total	293,184	100.00	71	–14
Valid votes	293,184	97.43		
Invalid/blank votes	7,742	2.57		
Total votes	300,926	100.00		
Registered voters/turnout	449,835	66.90		
Source: Slavic-Eurasian Research Centre
