= Liberalism in Montenegro =

This article gives an overview of liberalism in Montenegro.

== History ==
Following the fall of communist regime, one of the first parties to emerge was Liberal Alliance (LSCG), a party which advocated liberalism, pacifism, civic concept of the state and supported restoration of Montenegrin independence. It was an active opponent of the ruling DPS-led regime since its formation, all until 2005, when it froze its political activity. Slavko Perović and Miro Vicković were the most prominent officials and held the leading positions in the party throughout its existence. In 2004, nationalist Liberal Party (LP) split from the LSCG, its membership including a number of former high-ranking LSCG officials who were previously ousted from the party due to corruption affair. Despite attempting to adopt the legacy of LSCG, LP pursued an entirely different discourse, and has closely cooperated with ruling DPS since its foundation. Since 2016 election, its integrated into the electoral lists of DPS, which ran independently.

=== Liberal political parties in Montenegro ===
Active:

- United Reform Action (social liberal)
- Civis (social liberal)
- Democrats (conservative liberal)
- Demos (conservative liberal)
- Liberal Party (social liberal)
- Montenegrin (national liberal)

Historically:

- Union of Reform Forces (1990-1991)
- Liberal Alliance (1990-2005)
- Civic Party (2002-2009)
- Movement for Changes (2000s)
- Democratic Centre (2009-2014)
- Positive Montenegro (2012-2019)

== See also ==
- History of Montenegro
- Politics of Montenegro
- List of political parties in Montenegro
