= 1992 Montenegrin sovereignty referendum =

Montenegrin sovereignty referendum, 1992
- 1 March 1992
- Are you in favor of Montenegro, as a sovereign republic, continuing to live in a common state – Yugoslavia, fully equal to other republics that wish the same? Serbian: Да ли сте за то да Црна Гора, као суверена република, настави да живи у заједничкој држави − Југославији, потпуно равноправно са другим републикама које то буду жељеле?

Results
Choice	Votes	%
Yes	266,273	96.82%
No	8,755	3.18%
Valid votes	275,028	98.80%
Invalid or blank votes	3,354	1.20%
Total votes	278,382	100.00%
Registered voters/turnout	421,549	66.04%

Turnout at the 1992 Montenegrin sovereignty referendum by each municipality of Montenegro

The 1992 Montenegrin sovereignty referendum was the first referendum regarding Montenegrin sovereignty, held on 1 March 1992 in SR Montenegro, a constituent republic of the Socialist Federal Republic of Yugoslavia.

The referendum was the outcome of Montenegrin President Momir Bulatović's decision to agree to the terms set by Lord Carrington which were to transform Yugoslavia into a loose association of independent states that would have the status of subjects under international law. Bulatović's decision angered his ally, the Serbian President Slobodan Milošević and the Serbian leadership, who added an amendment to the Carrington Plan that would allow states that did not wish to secede from Yugoslavia to establish a successor state.

421,549 citizens were registered voters. The question put to the electorate was, roughly translated:

Are you in favor of Montenegro, as a sovereign republic, continuing to live in a common state – Yugoslavia, fully equal to other republics that wish the same?

The electorate chose to remain within Yugoslavia. 95.96% of voters, which is 63.17% of the entire electorate, voted Yes, with a voter turnout of 66.04%. Importantly for understanding the result, pro-independence parties had their supporters boycott the vote.

As a result of this referendum, the Federal Republic of Yugoslavia, consisting of two former constituent republics of the SFR Yugoslavia, Serbia and Montenegro, was established on 27 April 1992.

== Background ==
In early October 1991, Montenegrin forces and the Yugoslav People's Army (JNA) began the Siege of Dubrovnik. The JNA's bombardment of Dubrovnik, including that of the Old Town — a UNESCO World Heritage Site — provoked international condemnation, and became a public relations disaster for Serbia and Montenegro, contributing to their diplomatic and economic isolation, as well as proving to be detrimental to Montenegro's internal stability and inter-ethnic relations within the republic.

Seeking a way out of the crisis, Montenegrin President Momir Bulatović took a significant political gamble, which put him at odds both with his political allies in Belgrade, Serbian nationalists in Montenegro, as well as many people in his own party. As the conflict in Croatia intensified, the European Community organized a peace conference on Yugoslavia in the Hague chaired by Lord Carrington, the former British Foreign Secretary who had served in Margaret Thatcher’s first cabinet. The Carrington Plan envisaged a loose association of independent states that would have the status of subjects under international law.

While uniformity with the Serbian line was anticipated from the Montenegrin side, Bulatović unexpectedly agreed to the terms of the Carrington Plan during an overnight session of the Montenegrin parliament on 17 October 1991. He agreed to sign a draft of the plan and Borisav Jović was alerted the following day. According to Jović, Bulatović had the support of the then Italian Foreign Minister Gianni De Michelis.

During the 24–25 October parliamentary sessions, the agreement was essentially ratified. However, the People's Party called for an emergency session of parliament, during which reactions to the plan were overwhelmingly negative. Bulatović and Prime Minister Milo Đukanović, who supported him during the session, were decried as traitors by a series of speakers including Branko Kostić, as well as Serbian state media and Slobodan Milošević. Unionist parties held demonstrations outside the parliament building.

Bulatović and Đukanović were called to Belgrade to attend a series of meetings with the Serbian leadership. Milošević tried to circumvent the perceived treason from the Montenegrin leadership by inserting a clause into the Carrington Plan that would allow any republic that wished to remain a part of Yugoslavia to do so. Faced with no consensus in Montenegro, the Montenegrin leadership backed down and agreed to Milošević's proposal. On 30 October 1991, Serbia and Montenegro proposed an amendment to the Carrington Plan that would allow states that did not wish to secede from Yugoslavia to establish a successor state. A referendum on the establishment of the Federal Republic of Yugoslavia, which claimed legitimate continuity of the SFRY, would take place in Montenegro in March 1992.

== Campaign and conduct ==
In the run-up to the referendum, the two ruling parties in Serbia and Montenegro negotiated on the formation and distribution of power in the new Yugoslavia, left with around 40% of the territory and population of the previous country. Montenegrin President Momir Bulatović envisaged a confederal model with the common state possessing a single market, single currency, unitary monetary policy, a common foreign policy, albeit one that would permit separate consular representations, and a joint defense system that would allow some degree of autonomy.

The proposed principle of parity that Bulatović advocated was incrementally eroded in the aftermath of subsequent meetings between Bulatović and Serbian President Slobodan Milošević. The Serbian political elite was consistently opposed to the idea of the equal status of Montenegro within the federation. Due to its influence over the ruling elite in Montenegro, its position ultimately prevailed.

The Montenegrin ruling elite, wishing to facilitate the rapid acceptance of the new state, adopted the Law on Referendum, limiting public debate to a period of only seven days. The Montenegrin opposition argued against the undemocratic character of the referendum, staging demonstrations in Montenegrin towns and cities and attempting to persuade voters that there were alternatives to a close federation with Serbia. Throughout Montenegro, the ruling Democratic Party of Socialists campaigned under the slogan "Yugoslavia without alternative", and simultaneously worked towards limiting the scope for public debate, disrupting the activities of the opposition and implicitly threatening individuals with the potential loss of their livelihoods.

The referendum was boycotted by opposition parties such as the Liberal Alliance of Montenegro, the Social Democratic and Socialist Parties, as well as minority parties such as the Democratic League in Montenegro, leading to a relatively low turnout of 66%.

== Blocs ==
=== Federation ===
- Democratic Party of Socialists (DPS)

Support:

- People's Party of Montenegro (NS)
- Serbian Radical Party in Montenegro (SRS)

=== Independence (boycott) ===
- Liberal Alliance of Montenegro (LSCG)
- Democratic League in Montenegro (DSCG)

Support:

- Social Democratic Party of Montenegro (SDP)

== Results ==
=== Total ===
Registered Voters: 421,549

- Total: 278,382 (66.04%)
  - Yes votes: 266,273 (95.96%)
  - No votes: 8,755 (3.14%)

YES	95.96%
NO	3.14%

=== By municipality ===
Source: Centre for Monitoring

Municipality	No	Yes	Registered Voters	Voted	Turnout
Andrijevica	5 (0.11%)	4,596 (99.61%)	4,720	4,614	97.75%
Bar	616 (5%)	11,523 (93.61%)	25,550	12,309	48.18%
Berane	697 (3.99%)	16,679 (95.37%)	25,040	17,488	69.84%
Bijelo Polje	363 (1.65%)	21,271 (96.75%)	35,597	21,985	61.76%
Budva	204 (3.20%)	6,124 (95.99%)	8,696	6,380	73.37%
Cetinje	326 (3.41%)	9,093 (95.24%)	14,408	9,547	66.26%
Danilovgrad	93 (1.03%)	8,092 (89.28%)	11,319	9,064	80.08%
Herceg Novi	486 (3.09%)	15,071 (95.79%)	21,130	15,374	74.46%
Kolašin	44 (0.67%)	6,455 (98.47%)	8,103	6,555	80.90%
Kotor	693 (5.83%)	10,937 (91.98%)	16,560	11,981	71.81%
Mojkovac	35 (0.52%)	6,677 (99.23%)	7,508	6,729	89.62%
Nikšić	775 (1.76%)	43,160 (97.83%)	52,758	44,118	83.62%
Plav	96 (3.37%)	2,730 (95.79%)	10,314	2,850	27.63%
Pljevlja	452 (2.05%)	21,543 (97.50%)	28,573	22,095	77.33%
Plužine	12 (0.36%)	3,353 (99.29%)	3,763	3,377	89.74%
Podgorica	2,746 (4.03%)	64,955 (95.21%)	103,211	68,222	66.10%
Rožaje	136 (8.98%)	1,360 (89.77%)	13,962	1,515	10.85%
Šavnik	16 (0.66%)	2,385 (98.68%)	2,731	2,417	88.50%
Tivat	720 (12.37%)	4,915 (84.44%)	8,737	5,821	66.62%
Ulcinj	215 (7.98%)	2,411 (89.50%)	15,363	2,694	17.54%
Žabljak	25 (0.84%)	2,943 (98.86%)	3,506	2,977	84.91%

== Aftermath ==
A new constitution forming the Federal Republic of Yugoslavia came into effect on 27 April 1992. The Montenegrin opposition would refer to the new constitution scornfully as the "Žabljak Constitution" after the mountain resort in Montenegro where the two leaderships had met to create the new state. Its core argument was that the FRY was an unequal construction that would simply become dysfunctional, due to the fact that it was made up of two federal units of disproportionate size, population, and economic interests. Such a situation prompted even those within the ruling DPS, such as the then Montenegrin Foreign Minister Miodrag Lekić, to argue that within the FRY structure Montenegrin interests were insufficiently protected.

Angered by Momir Bulatović's intention to agree to Lord Carrington's plan in October 1991, as well as his request that a special session of the Montenegrin Assembly should be called to discuss the possibility of another referendum, the ruling Socialist Party of Serbia (SPS) supported Bulatović's opponent in the 1992 presidential election, Branko Kostić. During the election campaign, Bulatović sought to continue to strike a balance between Montenegro's political poles of unionism and nationalism, arguing in favor of Montenegrin autonomy and equality with Serbia within the FRY framework. Kostić presented himself as a "Greater Serb", aligning himself directly with Slobodan Milošević and the policy of the SPS. The DPS triumphed in the concurrent parliamentary election, and Milo Đukanović continued to serve as Prime Minister of Montenegro, eventually straying further still from the policies advocated by the Serbian leadership.

== See also ==
- Breakup of Yugoslavia
- 2006 Montenegrin independence referendum
