= Miodrag Živković =

Miodrag Živković may refer to:

- Miodrag Živković (politician), Montenegrin politician (Liberal Party of Montenegro), born 1957
- Miodrag Živković (sculptor), Serbian sculptor and university professor, 1928-2020
