= 1990 Montenegrin general election =

- Presidential election
- 9 December 1990 (first round); 23 December 1990 (second round)
- Turnout: 75.69% (first round), 65.21% (second round)
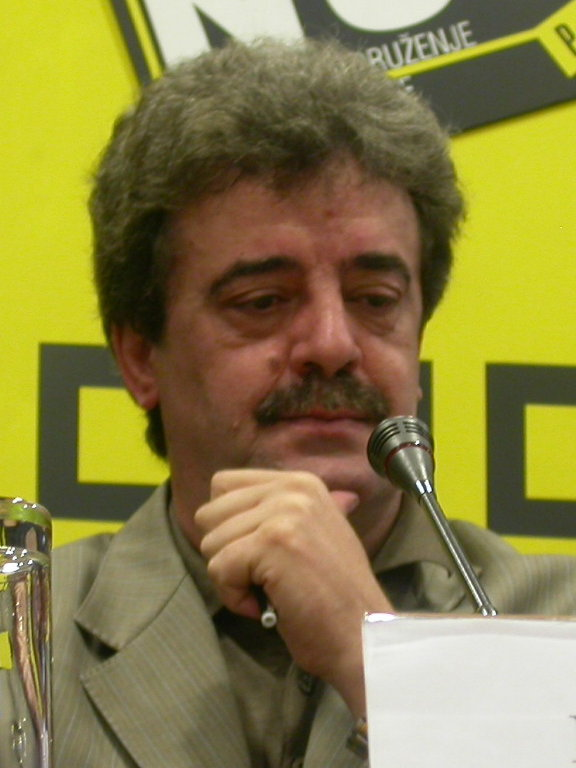

Candidate	Momir Bulatović	Ljubiša Stanković
Party	SKCG	SRSJ
Popular vote	203,616	56,990
Percentage	78.13%	21.87%
President before election
Momir Bulatović
SKCG
Elected President
Momir Bulatović
SKCG
- Parliamentary election
- 9 December 1990
Party	Leader	Vote %	Seats
SKCG	Momir Bulatović	56.29	83
SRSJ	Ljubiša Stanković	14.07	17
NS	Novak Kilibarda	13.31	13
SDA CG–DS	Harun Hadžić	10.47	12
This lists parties that won seats. See the complete results below.
Prime Minister before	Prime Minister after
Radoje Kontić; SKCG	Milo Đukanović; SKCG

General elections were held in SR Montenegro on 9 December 1990, with a second round of the presidential election held on 23 December. Momir Bulatović of the League of Communists won the presidential election, whilst his party emerged as the largest in Parliament, winning 83 of the 125 seats.

== Results ==
=== President ===
In order to be elected in the first round, a candidate had to cross a threshold of 50% of the registered voters. Although incumbent President of the Presidency Momir Bulatović received 62% of the valid votes, this was only 42.2% of the registered voters. However, he went on to win the second round convincingly against Ljubiša Stanković of the Union of Reform Forces of Yugoslavia, becoming the first elected President of Montenegro.

Candidate	Party	First round		Second round	
Candidate	Party	Votes	%	Votes	%
Momir Bulatović	League of Communists of Montenegro	170,092	62.62	203,616	78.13
Ljubiša Stanković	Union of Reform Forces of Yugoslavia	65,998	24.30	56,990	21.87
Novak Kilibarda	People's Party	35,531	13.08		
Total		271,621	100.00	260,606	100.00
Valid votes		271,621	89.07	260,606	99.19
Invalid/blank votes		33,326	10.93	2,128	0.81
Total votes		304,947	100.00	262,734	100.00
Registered voters/turnout		402,905	75.69	402,905	65.21
Source: B92

=== National Assembly ===
Party	Votes	%	Seats
League of Communists of Montenegro	171,316	58.29	83
Union of Reform Forces of Yugoslavia	41,364	14.07	17
People's Party	39,107	13.31	13
Democratic Coalition (SDA–DS–SR)	30,760	10.47	12
Democratic Party	3,442	1.17	0
Demo-Christian (Orthodox) Party	1,753	0.60	0
Socialist Alliance of Montenegro	1,638	0.56	0
Yugoslav People's Party	1,224	0.42	0
Democratic Alliance of Independent Entrepreneurs	844	0.29	0
Independents	2,435	0.83	0
Total	293,883	100.00	125
Valid votes	293,883	96.28	
Invalid/blank votes	11,358	3.72	
Total votes	305,241	100.00	
Registered voters/turnout	402,905	75.76	
Source: Slavic-Eurasian Research Centre
