= Žarko Rakčević =

Montenegrin politician and businessman

Žarko Rakčević (Serbian Cyrillic: Жарко Ракчевић; born March 21, 1961, in Podgorica) is a Montenegrin politician and businessman. He was one of the founders and first president (2015–17) of social liberal political party United Reform Action (URA). He is currently president of the Political Council of URA.

Having finished Gymnasium "Slobodan Škerović" in Podgorica, Rakčević graduated at the Faculty of Economics at the University of Montenegro. He obtained a master's degree in 1983. He was one of the founders of centre-left Social Democratic Party of Montenegro (SDP CG) in 1993 and long-term president of the Party (1993–2002). Rakčević was Deputy Prime Minister of Montenegro in the second DPS-SDP coalition government, from 2001 to 2003.
