= Miodrag Živković (politician) =

Montenegrin politician

Miodrag "Miko" Živković (Serbian Cyrillic: Миодраг "Мико" Живковић; born 20 September 1957) is a Montenegrin politician. He is a former president of the Liberal Alliance of Montenegro until he was expelled after allegations of corruption in what is known as Trsteno Affair. Following the expulsion he founded Liberal Party of Montenegro, and later the Montenegrin Democratic Union.

Born to father Đorđije (teacher) and mother Vojislava (homemaker), Živković finished primary and secondary school in Kotor. In 1976 he enrolled at the University of Belgrade's Law School, but graduated at the Veljko Vlahović University in Titograd.

== Political career ==
He finished the judicial exam in Belgrade in 1982. The same year he was accepted as a judge of Kotor Basic Court, a post which he held for 8 years, in parallel with State Court official for a short time, until he left the state institutions in 1990, disappointed in the state's ideological policies under Momir Bulatović, Milo Đukanović and Svetozar Marović of the Democratic Party of Socialists of Montenegro that favoured authoritarianism and Serbian nationalism.

=== Liberal Alliance of Montenegro ===
The same year he entered business as a lawyer and actively worked in the liberal movement that formed itself as the Liberal Alliance of Montenegro in 1991, starting his political career as delegate of the Liberal Alliance to the municipal board in Kotor. In 1994 he was elected president of the Liberal Alliance's municipal board in Kotor. At the Liberal Alliance conference in January 1999 in Igalo, Živković was elected as the party's new leader, replacing Slavko Perović who handed in his resignation.

Repairing Liberal Alliance's position in 2001, Živković cooperated with the pro-Serbian Together for Change opposition political alliance but due to ideological difference mainly centered in his support of an independent Montenegro, he supported a minority Democratic Party of Socialists-Social Democratic Party government of Filip Vujanović. In 2002 he opposed the Belgrade Agreement which formed the State Union of Serbia and Montenegro fully reintegrating Montenegro into a common state with Serbia, bringing down the government with the rest of the opposition. However his position was considerably weakened at the same year's parliamentary elections, when Milo Đukanović managed to form a government alone.

=== Liberal Party of Montenegro ===
After being accused of political corruption regarding the sale of state owned land in what is known as Trsteno Affair sr, he was excluded from LSCG and consequently founded Liberal Party of Montenegro. He ran at the repeated 2003 presidential election on 11 May, coming in second with 68,133 votes or 31.4% of those who voted and lost to Democratic Party of Socialists candidate Filip Vujanović. On 31 October 2004 the Liberal Party held a constitutional assembly on which he was elected the party's president. At the 2006 independence referendum he joined Milo Đukanović's Bloc for an independent Montenegro and served as one of its key leaders, bringing it to a victory. He led the Liberal Party into a coalition with the Bosniak Party that ran together at the same year's subsequent constitutional parliamentary election, managing to pass the census.

He was reelected Party President on 25 November 2006.

== Private life ==
He is married to Milica Ranković and in 1987 they had a daughter, Sanja.
