= May 2003 Montenegrin presidential election =

- 11 May 2003
- Registered: 458,888
- Turnout: 48.32%
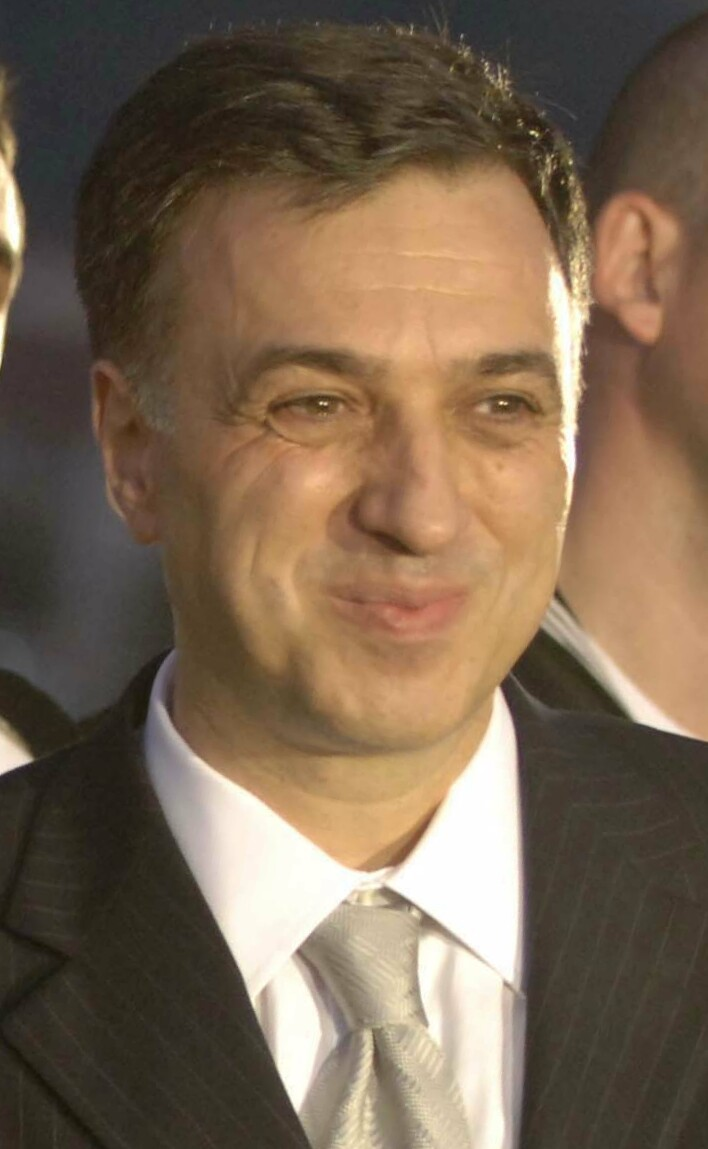

Candidate	Filip Vujanović	Miodrag Živković
Party	DPS	LSCG
Popular vote	139,574	68,169
Percentage	64.25%	31.38%
President before election
Filip Vujanović (acting)
DPS
Elected President
Filip Vujanović
DPS

Presidential elections were held in Montenegro on 11 May 2003. They were the third such elections in six months, as those held in December 2002 and February 2003 had been declared invalid due to voter turnouts of less than 50%. For the May election, the turnout rule was abolished. The result was a victory for Filip Vujanović, who was nominated by the Democratic Party of Socialists of Montenegro and Social Democratic Party of Montenegro, who received 64.2% of the vote. Vujanović had also won both previous votes by a large margin. The elections were boycotted by the opposition Together for Change coalition.

== Results ==
Although Dragan Hajduković was a member of the Greens of Montenegro, he ran as an independent.

Candidate	Party	Votes	%
Filip Vujanović	Democratic Party of Socialists	139,574	64.25
Miodrag Živković	Liberal Alliance of Montenegro	68,169	31.38
Dragan Hajduković	Independent	9,501	4.37
Total		217,244	100.00
Valid votes		217,244	97.97
Invalid/blank votes		4,508	2.03
Total votes		221,752	100.00
Registered voters/turnout		458,888	48.32
Source: Nohlen & Stöver
