= Dragiša Burzan =

Montenegrin politician and diplomat

- Драгиша Вурзан

Minister of Foreign Affairs
- In office 8 January 2003 – 29 July 2004
- Prime Minister: Milo Đukanović
- Preceded by: Dragan Đurović (Acting)
- Succeeded by: Miodrag Vlahović

Personal details
- Born: 13 September 1950 (age 75) Titograd, Montenegro, Yugoslavia
- Party: Social Democratic Party of Montenegro
- Education: University of Belgrade; University of Essex

Dragiša Burzan (Montenegrin Cyrillic: Драгиша Бурзан; born 13 September 1950) is a Montenegrin politician and diplomat. He served as Montenegrin ambassador to the United Kingdom from 2007 to 2010. Before that, he was the ambassador of Serbia and Montenegro to the UK from 2004 to 2006, as well as the Minister of Foreign Affairs of Montenegro from 2003 to 2004.

== Early life and education ==
Burzan attended school in Titograd, then part of Yugoslavia. He attended the University of Montenegro, where he received a bachelor's degree in electrical engineering, and went on to receive a master's degree in nuclear physics from the University of Belgrade and a Ph.D. in theoretical physics from the University of Essex, England.

He became a professor at the University of Montenegro in the Department of Natural Sciences pursuing research in physics; he there from 1976 through 1998, although he became active in politics by the late 1980s.

== Political career ==
In 1989, he founded Democratic Alternative, an association at the University of Montenegro promoting democratic reforms in what was then still Yugoslavia.

In 1991, he was a member of Reform Forces of Yugoslavia, led by Ante Marković, the last Prime Minister of Yugoslavia.

In 1992, he was one of the founders of the Social Democratic Party of Montenegro (SDP) and was elected to Parliament, where he served from 1992 through 1996. He also served as the SDP's International Secretary, a post he held continuously apart from an interruption from July 1994 to October 1995, and served as the vice-president of the party from 1996 to 2000.

During his time in Parliament, he participated in and initiated numerous conferences, seminars, initiatives and networks aimed to end the various wars going on in the Balkans at the time. He also organized and supported civil society initiatives in Montenegro and the Balkans in general, with an emphasis on human rights, including co-founding the weekly Monitor newsletter.

In July 1998 he was appointed Deputy Prime Minister of Montenegro, a post he held until June 2001; his portfolio included the Ministry of Education, Ministry of Labor and Welfare, Ministry of Health, Ministry of Minor Nations, Ministry of Culture, Ministry of Sport, Secretariat of Information, Secretariat for International Culture and Science Cooperation, and Commissariat for Refugees, among others, and he served as the government's leader on refugee matters. Following this post, he was appointed Minister of Labor and Social Welfare from July 2001 through May 2002, at which point he was appointed Minister of Foreign Affairs.

He served as Ambassador of Serbia and Montenegro to London from 2004 to 2006, as well as Montenegrin Ambassador to London from 2007 to 2010.

== Personal life ==
Burzan is married, with two daughters and a son.
