= Danijel Živković =

Montenegrin politician (born 1987)

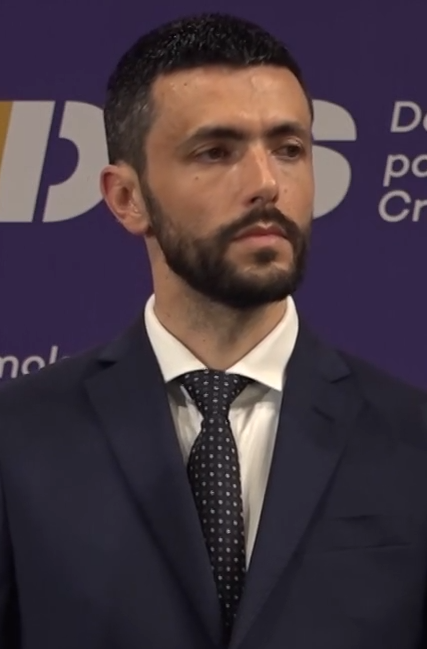
- Živković in April 2023

President of the DPS
- Incumbent
- Assumed office 6 April 2023
- Preceded by: Milo Đukanović

Member of Parliament
- Incumbent
- Assumed office 1 July 2017

Personal details
- Born: 15 August 1987 (age 39) Pljevlja, SR Montenegro, SFR Yugoslavia
- Party: Democratic Party of Socialists of Montenegro
- Education: University of Montenegro

Danijel Živković (Montenegrin Cyrillic: Данијел Живковић; born 15 August 1987) is a Montenegrin politician serving as a member of the Parliament of Montenegro since 1 July 2017 and the president of the Democratic Party of Socialists (DPS) since 6 April 2023. He succeeded the long-term DPS president Milo Đukanović who resigned following his loss to Jakov Milatović in the 2023 presidential election.

== Biography ==
Živković was born on 15 August 1987 in Pljevlja, SR Montenegro, SFR Yugoslavia. He graduated from the Faculty of Law at the University of Montenegro. Prior to entering politics, he worked as a legal advisor in the Municipality of Pljevlja.

=== Political career ===
Živković started his political career in 2014 when he was elected member of the Municipal Assembly of Pljevlja as a member of the ruling Democratic Party of Socialists (DPS) and the president of its municipal parliamentary group.

Following the resignation of Pavle Goranović as a DPS MP in the Parliament of Montenegro, Živković was appointed his replacement and became an MP on 1 July 2017. He was re-elected MP in the 2020 parliamentary election and was appointed president of DPS parliamentary group.

He was appointed acting president of DPS on 6 April 2023 following the resignation of the long-term DPS president Milo Đukanović who resigned following his loss to Jakov Milatović in the 2023 presidential election.

== Political positions ==
Živković is a critic of Serbia and Russia, stating that Serbian president Aleksandar Vučić wants to "violate our sovereignty".
