= Radoje Kontić =

Montenegrin politician and technologist

- Радоје Контић
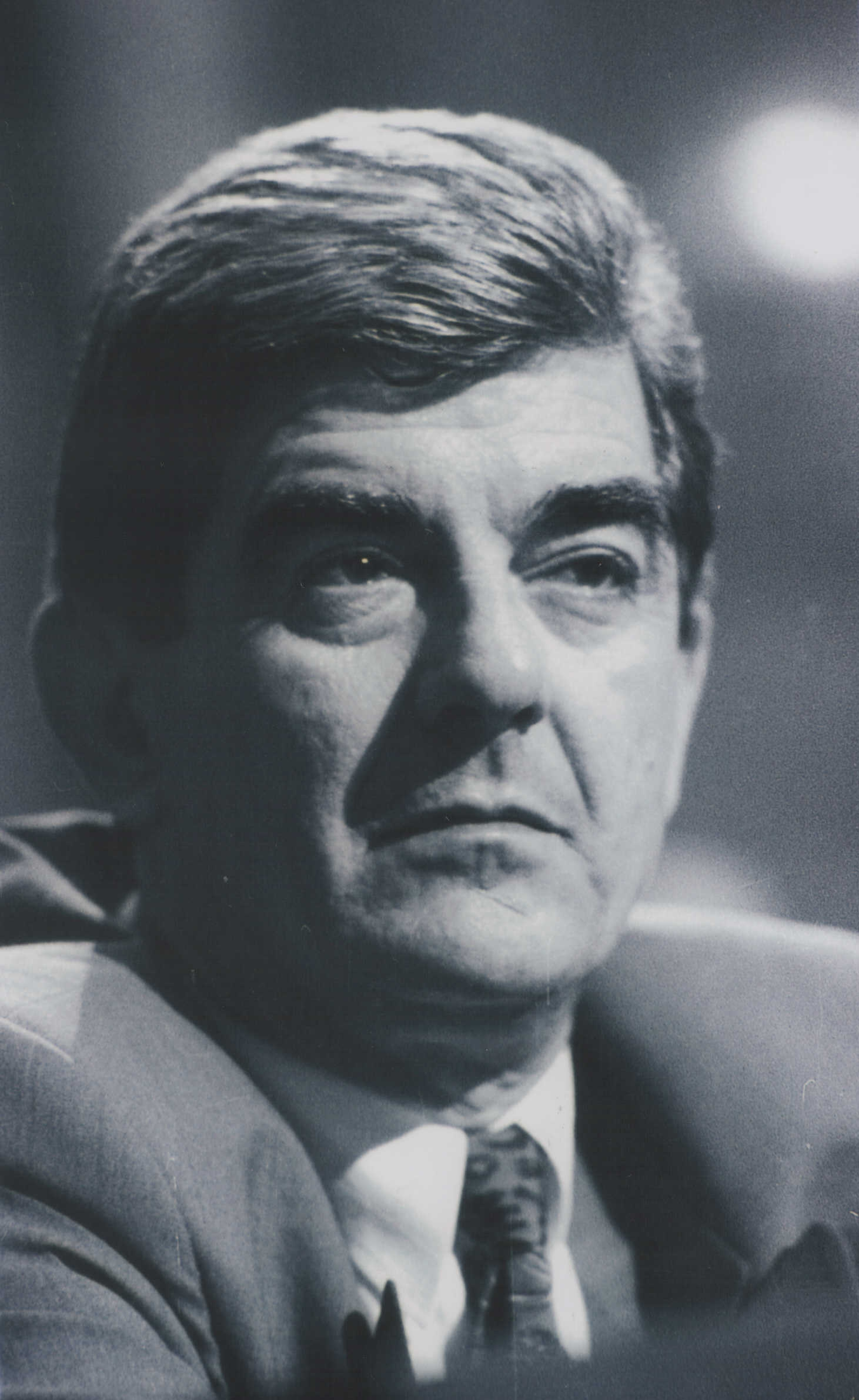

2nd Prime Minister of the Federal Republic of Yugoslavia
- In office 9 February 1993 – 19 May 1998
- Preceded by: Milan Panić
- Succeeded by: Momir Bulatović

12th President of the Executive Council of SR Montenegro
- In office 29 March 1989 – 15 February 1991
- Preceded by: Vuko Vukadinović
- Succeeded by: Office abolished

Personal details
- Born: 31 May 1937 (age 89) Nikšić, Montenegro
- Party: DPS (1992–2006); SKJ (1960s–1992)

Radoje Kontić (Serbo-Croatian Cyrillic: Радоје Контић: born 31 May 1937) is a Montenegrin former politician and technologist who served as the Prime Minister of the Federal Republic of Yugoslavia from 1993 to 1998.

== Biography ==
He was the last Chairman of the Socialist Republic of Montenegro's Executive Council from 1989 to 1991 - a post which he obtained by riding the wave of the anti-bureaucratic putsch in Montenegro during January 1989. He also served as the Prime Minister of Yugoslavia from February 9, 1993 until May 19, 1998 when he lost a no-confidence vote for refusing to prevent the Democratic Party of Socialists of Montenegro victory in Montenegro. He was a member of the League of Communists of Montenegro and later a member of the Democratic Party of Socialists of Montenegro.

Like many others in the technocratically inclined second generation of Yugoslav communists, Kontić entered politics through directorial stints in state-owned companies. In Kontić's particular case, he worked his way up the corporate/political ladder in the Nikšić steelmill throughout the late 1960s and 1970s. Finally in 1978 he became a member of SR Montenegro's Executive Council, thus entering politics full-time.

Political offices
Preceded by Vuko Vukadinović	President of the Executive Council of Montenegro; 29 March 1989–15 February 1991	Succeeded by post abolished/transformed Milo Đukanović (Prime Minister of Montenegro)
Preceded by Milan Panić	Prime Minister of the Federal Republic of Yugoslavia; 9 February 1993–19 May 1998	Succeeded by Momir Bulatović
