= Social Democratic Party of Montenegro =

Social Democratic Party Socijaldemokratska partija Социјалдемократска партија
- President: Ivan Vujović
- Honorary President: Ranko Krivokapić
- Founders: Žarko Rakčević; Ljubiša Stanković; Dragiša Burzan
- Founded: 12 June 1993
- Headquarters: Podgorica
- Youth wing: Forum mladih SDP Crne Gore
- Ideology: Montenegrin nationalism Pro-Europeanism; Social democracy
- Political position: Centre-left
- National affiliation: European Montenegro (1998–2016); European Alliance (since 2024)
- European affiliation: Party of European Socialists (associate)
- International affiliation: Progressive Alliance; Socialist International
- Parliament: 0 / 81
- Mayors: 1 / 25
- Local Parliaments: 26 / 844

Website
- www.sdp.co.me

Social Democratic Party of Montenegro (Montenegrin: Социјалдемократска партија Црне Горе, romanized: Socijaldemokratska partija Crne Gore; or just the Social Democratic Party, abbr. SDP) is a nationalist and social democratic political party in Montenegro. It is the only party in Montenegro to have full membership in the Socialist International. From 1998 until the 2016 coalition split, it was a minor coalition partner of the Democratic Party of Socialists, that led Montenegro from the introduction of the multi-party system until the 2020 Montenegrin parliamentary election.

== History ==
On 14 July 1991, members of Union of Reform Forces of Yugoslavia (SRSJ) from four coastal municipalities in the SR Montenegro, Herceg Novi, Kotor, Tivat and Budva, who were subsequently joined by reformists from Cetinje, formed the first regional Montenegrin political party - the Alliance of Reformists of the Montenegrin Coastline with Miodrag Marović as President. On 7 July 1992, the League united with Žarko Rakčević's Party of Socialists desiring to create a major Montenegrin party, forming the Social Democratic Party of Reformists (SDPR). Finally, on 12 June 1993, the Social Democratic Party of Reformists merged with the Socialist Party of Montenegro forming the Social Democratic Party of Montenegro, which was joined by smaller groups like the Independent Organization of Communists of Bar, the Alliance of Reform forces of Yugoslavia for Montenegro and the Party of National Tolerance and uniting the forces that opposed the policies of the Milošević regime during the Yugoslav wars. Eventually, Yugoslav People's Party and Old Yugoslav People's Party also merged into SDP in the following years. Notable founders include Žarko Rakčević, Dragiša Burzan and Ljubiša Stanković.

When the policies of the ruling Democratic Party of Socialists of Montenegro (DPS) turned towards the goal of full independence for Montenegro, DPS and SDP started working closely together to achieve this goal. Allying itself with the DPS and Đukanović ahead of the 1998 parliamentary elections allowed the SDP to enter the parliament for the first time in its history. Since the 1998 election, SDP has continued to a minor coalition partner of DPS and a part of every Montenegrin government between 1998 and 2015. The goal of restoration of the Montenegrin independence was achieved following the victory in a referendum held on 21 May 2006. President of the Parliament of Montenegro from 2003 to 2016, Ranko Krivokapić, officially proclaimed the independence of Montenegro on 3 June 2006.

Following the shift of the party towards a more critical and independent political course, in Autumn 2015 the pro-DPS faction of SDP formed a new party named Social Democrats of Montenegro (SD). On 22 January 2016, SDP officially left the ruling coalition with DPS and announced its support for a vote of no confidence against the government of Milo Đukanović on 25 January 2016. In the following 2016 parliamentary election SDP ran independently for the first time since 1996, and retained its parliamentary status, winning 5.23% of votes.

At the 2018 presidential elections, SDP nominated its MP Draginja Vuksanović, who was the first female presidential candidate in the history of Montenegro. Vuksanović finished third, winning 8.2% of the votes. On 29 June 2019, after Krivokapić resignation, Vuksanović was elected new president of the Party, making her the only female president of a Montenegrin political party, at the time. On this occasion, former President Krivokapic has been named honorary president.

== Electoral performance ==
=== Parliamentary elections ===
Election	Party leader	Performance				Alliance	Government
Election	Party leader	Votes	%	Seats	+/–	Alliance	Government
1992 (Note: Formally run as Social Democratic Party of Reformists (SDPR). Shortly after the election, the SDPR merged with extra-parliamentary Socialist Party (SP) to form Social Democratic Party (SDP). SDPR-elected MPs joined the newly-formed SDP's parliamentary group.)	Miodrag Marović	13,002	4.10%	4 / 85	New	—	Opposition
1996	Žarko Rakčević	16,708	5.66%	0 / 71	▼4	—	Extra-parliamentary
1998	Žarko Rakčević	170,080	48.87%	5 / 78	▲5	ECG	Coalition
2001	Žarko Rakčević	153,946	42.04%	6 / 77	▲1	ECG	Coalition
2002	Ranko Krivokapić	167,166	48.0%	7 / 75	▲1	ECG	Coalition
2006	Ranko Krivokapić	164,737	48.62%	7 / 81	0	ECG	Coalition
2009	Ranko Krivokapić	168,290	51.9%	9 / 81	▲2	ECG	Coalition
2012	Ranko Krivokapić	165,380	45.60%	6 / 81	▼3	ECG	Coalition 2012–15
2012	Ranko Krivokapić	165,380	45.60%	6 / 81	▼3	ECG	Opposition 2015–16
2016	Ranko Krivokapić	20,011	5.23%	4 / 81	▼2	—	Opposition
2020	Draginja Vuksanović	12,835	3.14%	2 / 81	▼2	—	Opposition 2020–22
2020	Draginja Vuksanović	12,835	3.14%	2 / 81	▼2	—	Coalition 2022
2020	Draginja Vuksanović	12,835	3.14%	2 / 81	▼2	—	Opposition 2022–23
2023	Raško Konjević	9,010	2.98%	0 / 81	▼2	—	Extra-parliamentary

=== Presidential elections ===
President of Montenegro
Election year	Candidate	#	1st round votes	%	#	2nd round votes	%	Notes
1997	Milo Đukanović	2nd	145,348	46.71%	1st	174,745	50.79	DPS, support
2003	Filip Vujanović	1st	139,574	64.2%	—N/a	—	—	ECG, support
2008	Filip Vujanović	1st	171,118	51.89%	—N/a	—	—	ECG, support
2018	Draginja Vuksanović	3rd	27,441	8.20%	—N/a	—	—	
2023	Draginja Vuksanović	5th	10,669	3.15%	—	—	—	

== Positions held ==
Major positions held by Social Democratic Party of Montenegro members:

President of the Parliament of Montenegro	Years
Ranko Krivokapić	2003–2016
