= 1997 Montenegrin presidential election =

Presidential election held in Montenegro, FR Yugoslavia

- 5 October 1997 (first round); 19 October 1997 (second round)
- Turnout: 67.55% (first round); 73.90% (second round)
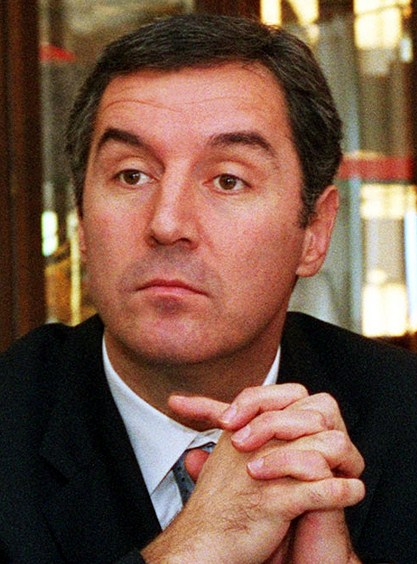

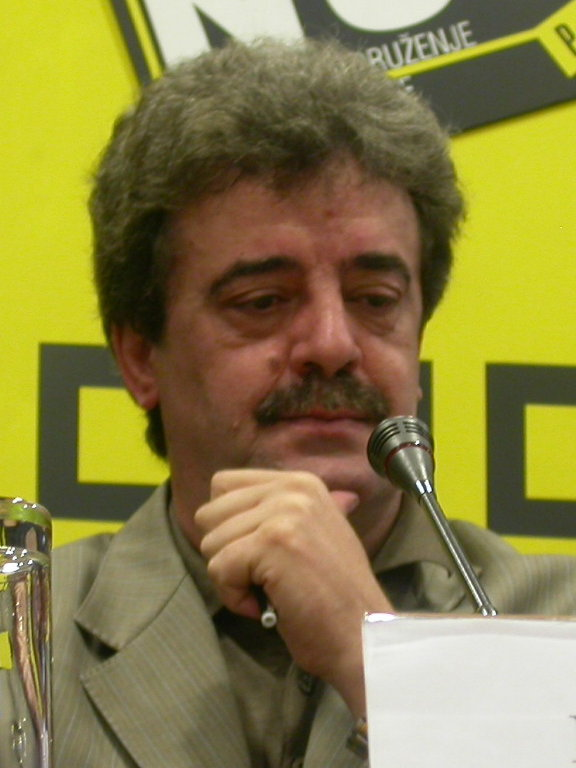
Nominee	Milo Đukanović	Momir Bulatović
Party	DPS	DPS–MB
Popular vote	174,745	169,257
Percentage	50.80%	49.20%
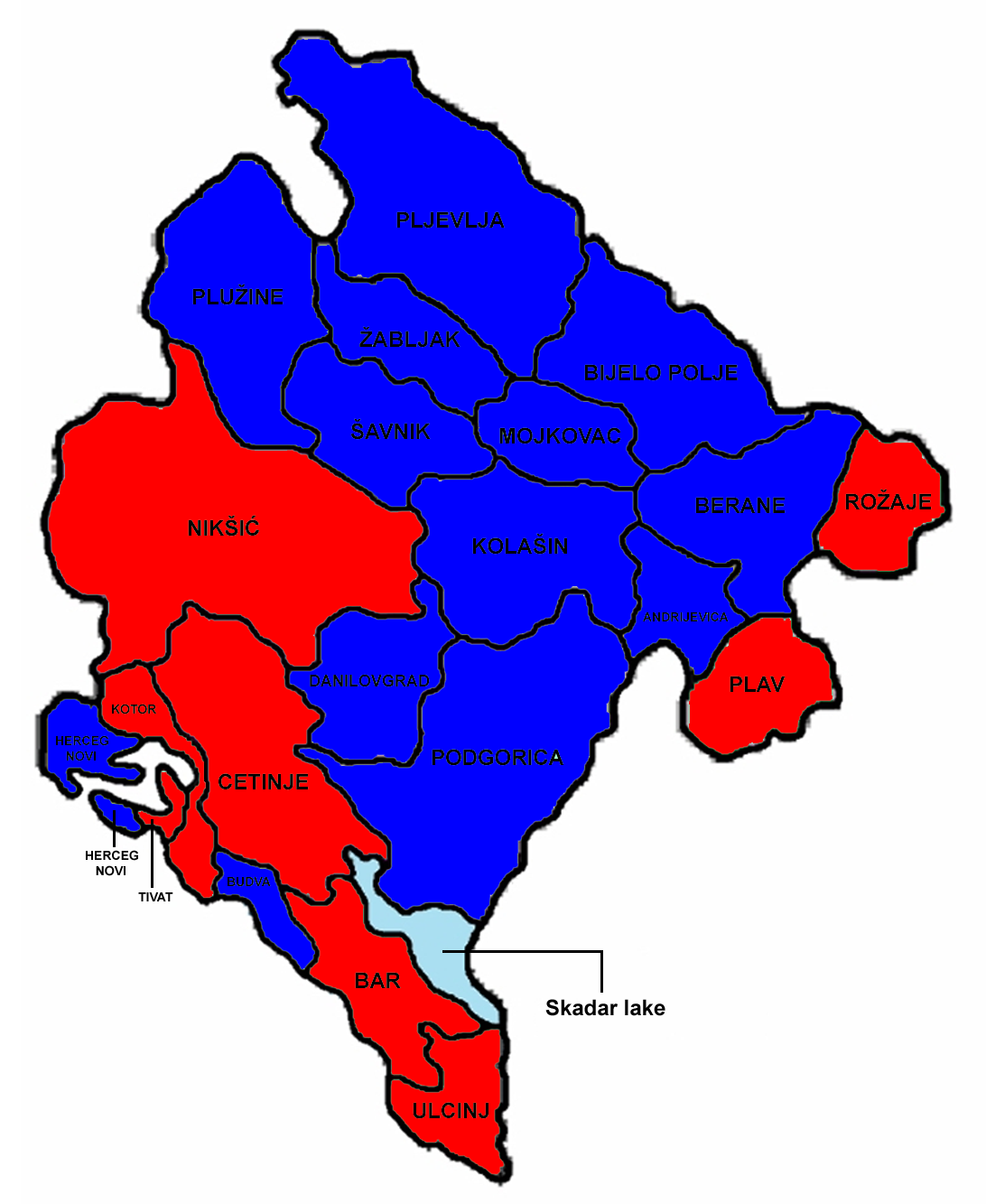
- Results of the second round by municipality Đukanović Bulatović
President before election
Momir Bulatović
DPS
Elected President
Milo Đukanović
DPS

Presidential elections were held in Montenegro, then a constituent republic of Yugoslavia, on 5 October 1997. A second round run-off was held on 19 October 1997. Although incumbent President Momir Bulatović, who was supportive of Yugoslavian President Slobodan Milošević, received a plurality of the vote in the first round, he was defeated in the second round by Prime Minister Milo Đukanović.

Despite OCSE recognising the elections as being "generally fair", Bulatović claimed the elections had been fraudulent and refused to recognise the result. Amid violent protests, Đukanović was sworn into office in January 1998.

== Background ==
The 1997 presidential election in Montenegro took place just months after the schism in the Democratic Party of Socialists (DPS), which occurred on July 11, 1997, after which Bulatović was replaced by Milica Pejanović-Đurišić. After the removal of Bulatović from presidency of DPS, Đukanović became nominated as the party's candidate, Likewise, Bulatović decided to run as well, with the backing of his loyalists who were not sympathetic to the new DPS leadership. However, article 5 of the electoral law restricted each party to nominating a single candidate. The Republican Election Commission allowed both candidates on the basis that Bulatović was a member of the party registered at the federal level, whilst Đukanović was a member at the Montenegrin level.

Following a complaint from one faction of the DPS, the Constitutional Court overruled the REC on the basis that only parties registered in Montenegro could nominate candidates. Bulatović subsequently appealed to the Federal Constitutional Court. Although the court declined his appeal, it also abolished article 5 of the electoral law, allowing Bulatović to compete.

The elections were nominally boycotted by several opposition parties, including the People's Party, the Liberal Alliance, the Party of Democratic Action, the Democratic League, the Democratic Union of Albanians and the Social Democratic Party. However, a majority of Liberal Alliance members supported Đukanović in the election as they saw Bulatović as a greater obstacle to their ideological goal, Montenegro's independence and eventual secession from Yugoslavia.

== Candidates ==
A total of eight candidates participated in the first round of the election, although Đukanović and Bulatović were overwhelming favorites to qualify for the second round.

Candidates	Party
Milo Đukanović	Democratic Party of Socialists of Montenegro
Momir Bulatović	Democratic Party of Socialists — Momir Bulatović
Dragan Hajduković	Independent candidate
Slobo Vujačić	Independent candidate
Aćim Višnjić	Independent candidate
Novica Stanić	Independent candidate
Novica Vojinović	Independent candidate
Milan Radulović	Independent candidate

== Campaign ==
All eight candidates appeared in a televised debate before the first round. The debate was aired on both state television and radio stations.

Dragan Hajduković, one of the candidates in the first round, had lived in Switzerland from the breakup of Yugoslavia up to 1997. During the schism of the Democratic Party of Socialists between Đukanović and Bulatović, Hajduković ultimately voiced support for Đukanović. As a result, he was accused by the Liberal Alliance of acting as a DPS client before he declared his candidacy. He campaigned on the immediate secession of Montenegro from Yugoslavia, stating in the summer of 1997 that "if Montenegro, from this day within the next six months, doesn't become independent, it never will." He campaigned on the idea of an "ecological state"-a concept he first touched on in 1990-promising 50,000 new jobs from eco-tourism, investments, specialization in healthy foods and "new technology".

Aćim Višnjić declared his candidacy after founding his own party, Otadžbinska stranka ("The Fatherland Party"), as he had been removed from the Serbian Radical Party. He campaigned on stronger federalization of Yugoslavia, arguing that there was no need for the constituent republics to have their own ministries of foreign affairs. When asked about how his platform differed from that of Bulatović, Višnjić said that he "didn't show enough strength" and that "a weakling can't rule Montenegro."

Bulatović campaigned significantly on his commitment to Yugoslavia and Milošević. One of his two campaign slogans was "Jugoslavija bez alternative", or "Yugoslavia without an alternative". Bulatović's strongest base was in northern Montenegro. Additionally, Bulatović enjoyed logistical support from Serbia. Đukanović, distancing himself from Bulatović and Milošević, emphasized a "European" and "reformist" portrayal. This image was supported by multiple western governments, who were indifferent to Đukanović's liabilities as long as he was opposed to Milošević. Đukanović, although appealing to secessionists, did not explicitly campaign on independence.

A Đukanović campaign poster from the 1997 presidential election showing a picture with Bill Clinton. The slogan exclaims: Get involved! Vote for Milo!

Rallies were employed by both candidates in the run-up to the election. On 1 October, Đukanović spoke to supporters in Podgorica, telling them, "we will win because we cannot allow national-Bolshevism to become the official ideology of Montenegro. We will not allow the newly-formed Šešelj-Bulatović coalition to tear apart and spoil Yugoslavia." Milica Pejanović-Đurišić participated in Đukanović's campaign. On October 2, Bulatović spoke to supporters at Berane's stadium, where he told supporters that "the road followed by Mr. Đukanović is not Montenegrin. He symbolises everything that Montenegro might become if Montenegro stops being Montenegro. That road is a road of lawlessness, despotism, immorality and lies."

The first round of voting took place on 5 October, with Bulatović receiving the most votes but failing to win outright. On 7 October, the Liberal Alliance, which had initially boycotted the first round on a nominal basis, officially came out for Đukanović, as the party produced a statement telling its members "we're certain that it's better to be in company with Yeltsin and Clinton than Bulatović, Milošević, and Šešelj. With them [we] can only go to a new war against neighbors, into new and even greater misery and isolation." On 14 October, a final televised debate was aired on RTCG between Đukanović and Bulatović, where the two final candidates debated on various topics, including but not limited to control of the Ministry of Internal Affairs, state funds for pensioners and the disabled, the "gray" economy, and Montenegro's role and status in the Federal Republic of Yugoslavia. The second round of voting took place on 19 October, with Đukanović winning in an upset victory.

== Operation Ljubović ==
On 14 October, five days before the second round of the election, the Republic of Montenegro's police raided the Ljubović hotel in Podgorica, arresting 11 men under the pretext that they were paramilitary members from Belgrade and Novi Sad who plotted to assassinate Đukanović. Vukašin Maraš, a former UDBA operative and Đukanović's security advisor at the time of the election, claimed to have personally discovered the plot. The Montenegrin police subsequently evacuated Vladimir Kovačević and Petar Divjaković from Montenegro, who they asserted were the ringmasters of the plot. The remaining arrested individuals were claimed to be members of Yugoslavia's Red Berets, although none of them were armed at the time of their arrest; the police asserted that the arrested individuals were anticipating the procurement of arms from "a criminal group in Nikšić". The police released the Ljubović suspects from custody almost immediately after Đukanović won the election and the High Court of Montenegro removed all charges against all persons involved in 2002.

== Conduct and involvement of the United States ==
Đukanović's victory was unexpected and considered an upset even among those who supported him, as he turned around a deficit in a period of 14 days between the first and second voting rounds. A critical circumstance was a spike in the list of registered voters, which had increased by 10,235 in the two-week period between voting rounds.

Bulatović immediately protested the election results, re-iterating grievances of electoral commission members who had been intimidated during the voting process. Additionally, Đukanović's victory had enormous international implications, as Robert Gelbard explicitly stated that "the United States government supports the election of president-elect Đukanović." On 12 January 1998, Gelbard visited Montenegro, where he condemned demonstrations against Đukanović's inauguration. Gelbard claimed that Bulatović promised him in person that he would recognize the election results. On 13 January 1998, Bulatović told supporters in Podgorica that he spoke with Gelbard, stating, "I had the opportunity and privilege to speak with [Gelbard], and I asked him how do they know in America what we don't know in Montenegro? From where did this idea occur to the American administration, which is highly valued and influential, that we're preparing an armed rebellion and violence?" Bulatović denied to the crowd that he had promised Gelbard to recognize the result. He ultimately rejected the election result, and asserted that the United States helped determine the outcome.

"The fact is that over two years ago we recognized that Milo Đukanović had the potential to become an effective counterweight to Milošević and his authoritarian policies. I began meeting with Đukanović regularly even before he became the President of Montenegro a year and a half ago. I was with him during his inauguration when we felt that a strong international presence, a public presence, would deter a Milošević-inspired coup."

— Gelbard testifying in front of the U.S. Senate during the "Prospects for Democracy in Yugoslavia" hearings on 29 July 1999.

Additionally, Bulatović claimed that US Secretary of State Madeleine Albright was informed of the election result before the electoral commission made an announcement. He also claimed that the electoral judge had revealed personal details of intimidation.

"The chairman of the electoral commission, the Judge Marko Dakić (who in my mind was a fair person and an excellent lawyer) asked me to see him amongst the audience. He was on the verge of physical and mental breakdown and visibly under huge pressure as a consequence of continuous lack of sleep. He explained in a rather confused manner what was happening...that they were under intolerable pressure to announce the result. He was mentioning threats that had been directed at him and that he had a fear both for his family and himself. All in all it was clear that he had to announce that Milo was the victor."

— Bulatović in Pravila ćutanja (2005).

== Results ==
Candidate	Party	First round		Second round	
Candidate	Party	Votes	%	Votes	%
Momir Bulatović	Democratic Party of Socialists–Momir Bulatović	147,615	48.16	169,257	49.20
Milo Đukanović	Democratic Party of Socialists	145,348	47.42	174,745	50.80
Novica Stanić	Independent	5,109	1.67		
Aćim Višnjić	Independent	4,635	1.51		
Dragan Hajduković	Independent	1,988	0.65		
Novica Vojnović	Independent	785	0.26		
Milan Radulović	Independent	620	0.20		
Slobodan Vujačić	Independent	383	0.12		
Total		306,483	100.00	344,002	100.00
Valid votes		306,483	98.51	344,002	98.94
Invalid/blank votes		4,635	1.49	3,691	1.06
Total votes		311,118	100.00	347,693	100.00
Registered voters/turnout		460,568	67.55	470,491	73.90
Source: Slavic-Eurasian Research Centre

== Aftermath ==
With Đukanović's inauguration scheduled on 15 January 1998, Bulatović participated in mobilizing a demonstration in Podgorica on the night of 14 January. Thousands of protesters demonstrated near government buildings as well as the offices of TV Crna Gora and Pobjeda, where violent confrontations with the police ensued. According to government-operated daily Pobjeda, total of 55 people were injured during the riot that night, 45 of them being policemen and 10 civilians.
