= Democratic League in Montenegro =

Democratic League in Montenegro Demokratski savez u Crnoj Gori Lidhja Demokratike në Mal të Zi
- Leader: Mehmet Bardhi
- Founder: Fuad Nimani
- Founded: 9 September 1990
- Headquarters: Ulcinj
- Ideology: Albanian minority interests Liberal conservatism Pro-Europeanism
- Political position: Centre-right
- National affiliation: Albanian Alliance (2023–present)
- Parliament: 0 / 81

The Democratic League in Montenegro (Montenegrin: Demokratski savez u Crnoj Gori, Albanian: Lidhja Demokratike në Mal të Zi) is an Albanian minority political party in Montenegro.

== History ==
It was one of the key organizers (together with the Liberals) of the 1992 Montenegrin independence referendum. Prior to the 2012 elections Democratic League in Montenegro decided to enter the Albanian Coalition with the Albanian Alternative (AA) and the Democratic Party (DP). The AA and DSCG had contested the 2009 elections as the "Albanian List", winning a single seat. Led by Fatmir Deka, in the 2012 elections the alliance received 1.1% of the vote, winning one seat. In September 2016, the Democratic League in Montenegro and Democratic Party (DP) decided to sign an agreement with Albanian Coalition "Perspective" for 2016 elections, but they fail to win single seat in Parliament.

== Electoral performance ==
=== Parliamentary elections ===
Election	Party leader	Performance				Alliance	Government
Election	Party leader	Votes	%	Seats	+/–	Alliance	Government
1990	Fuad Nimani	30,760	10.47%	5 / 125	New	SDA	Opposition
1992	Fuad Nimani	11,393	3.97%	0 / 75	▼5	—	Extra-parliamentary
1996	Mehmet Bardhi	5,289	1.80%	2 / 75	▲2	—	Opposition
1998	Mehmet Bardhi	5,425	1.58%	1 / 75	▼1	—	Support
2001	Mehmet Bardhi	3.570	0.98%	1 / 75	0	—	Coalition
2002	Mehmet Bardhi	8,498	2.44%	1 / 75	0	AZ	Coalition
2006	Mehmet Bardhi	4,373	1.29%	1 / 81	0	PDP	Support
2009	Mehmet Bardhi	2.898	0.89%	1 / 81	0	AA	Support
2012	Mehmet Bardhi	3.824	1.07%	0 / 81	▼1	AK	Extra-parliamentary
2016	Mehmet Bardhi	3.394	0.89%	0 / 81	0	AK	Extra-parliamentary
2020	Mehmet Bardhi	4,675	1.14%	0 / 81	0	AK	Extra-parliamentary
2023	Mehmet Bardhi	4,512	1.49%	0 / 81	0	AA	Extra-parliamentary
