= Montenegrin nationalism =

Nationalism that asserts that Montenegrins are a nation

The flag of Montenegro

Montenegrin nationalism is the nationalism that asserts that Montenegrins are a nation and promotes the cultural unity of Montenegrins.

From the beginning of the 18th century, the population of Montenegro was torn between variants of Montenegrin and Serbian nationalism. As opposed to Serbian nationalism, which emphasizes the ethnic Serbian character of the Montenegrins, Montenegrin nationalism emphasizes the right of the Montenegrins to define themselves as a unique nation, not simply as a branch of the Serbs.

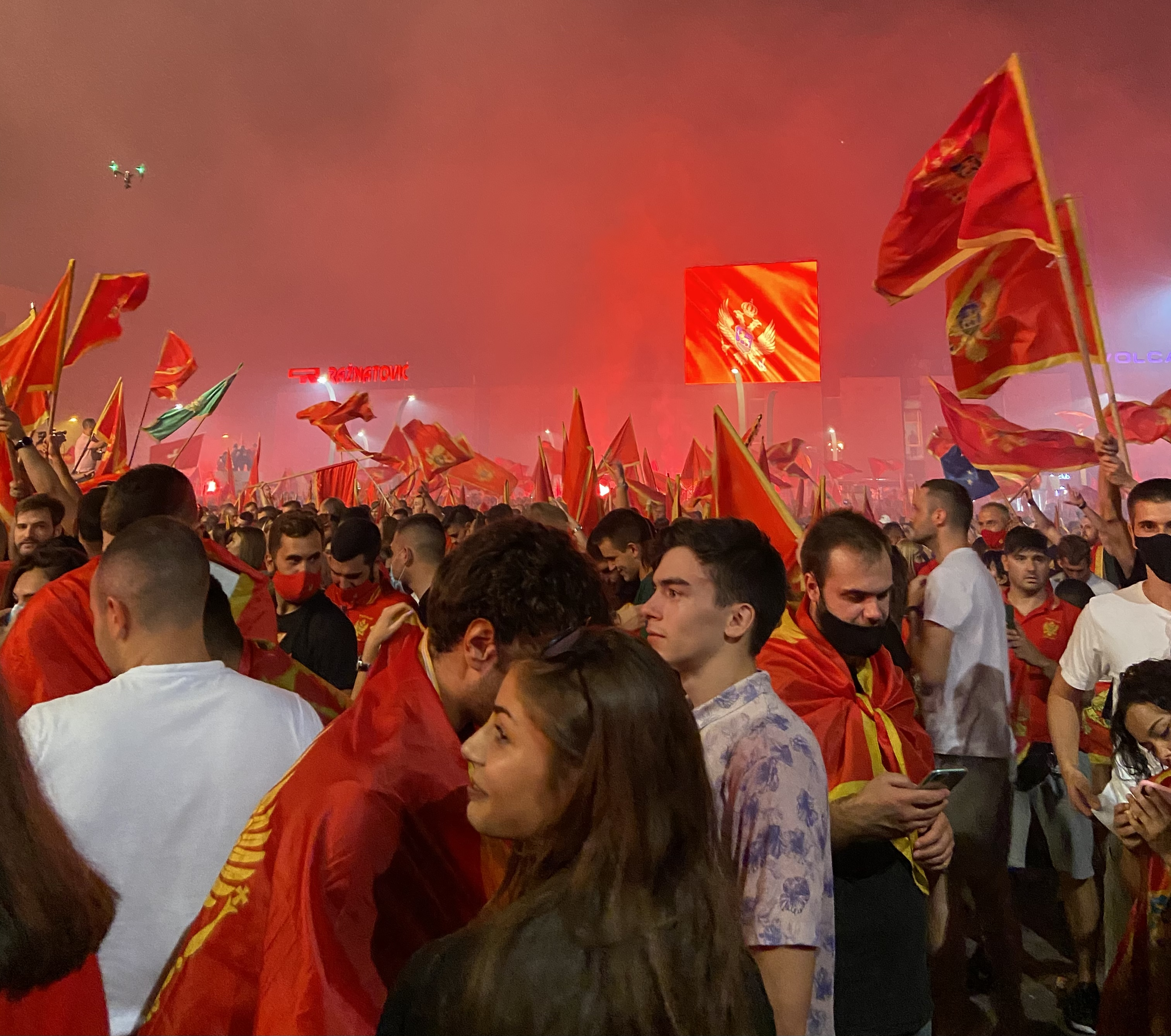
Montenegrin patriotic rally

Montenegrin nationalism became a major political issue in World War I when a schism arose between Montenegro's tribes over plans to merge Montenegro with the Kingdom of Serbia, between the pro-independence Green tribes, that included the King of Montenegro amongst them, versus the pro-unification White tribes. Montenegrin ethnicity was recognized by the Communist government of Yugoslavia in the 1960s though it had been declared previously.

During the breakup of Yugoslavia in the early 1990s, Montenegro's President Momir Bulatović supported unity and alliance with Serbia as well as supporting irredentist claims to Dubrovnik and territory in Herzegovina that he stated were historically part of Montenegro. The Serbian journal Epoha in 1991 declared that if Bosnia and Herzegovina's Bosniaks wanted to secede from Yugoslavia, that Eastern Herzegovina should be ceded to Montenegro. The International Criminal Tribunal for the former Yugoslavia declared that the Serbian and Montenegrin leadership during the siege of Dubrovnik sought to annex Dubrovnik along with the "coastal regions of Croatia between the town of Neum, Bosnia and Herzegovina, in the north-west and the Montenegrin border in the south-east" into Montenegro.

After 1998, Montenegro's government led by Milo Đukanović demanded greater autonomy within the Federal Republic of Yugoslavia. In 2006, a majority of just over 55% of Montenegrin citizens voted in favour of independence from the state union with Serbia. Contemporary Montenegrin nationalism cites that an independent Montenegrin culture separate from Serbian culture arose after Serbia was taken over by the Ottoman Empire in the 15th century while Montenegro remained independent for many years.

== History ==
=== Creation of Yugoslavia ===
Jovan Plamenac, political leader of the Greens.	Krsto Popović, commander of the Greens.

Montenegrin nationalism first strongly arose in the aftermath of World War I when Montenegrins became divided over whether to join the Kingdom of Serbs, Croats, and Slovenes (Yugoslavia) under the Karađorđević dynasty. The Montenegrin government in 1917 agreed to merge Montenegro into a South Slavic federation, however a political group known as the Greens that included the King of Montenegro and several powerful tribes opposed unification and advocated an independent Montenegrin state. The faction in favour of unification was the Whites, who desired unification of Montenegro with Serbia.

The feud between the anti-Karađorđević Greens and the pro-Karađorđević Whites over Montenegro's joining with Yugoslavia continued and escalated in the 1920s. The Greens were infuriated with the Montenegrin Petrović dynasty being dismantled in favor for the Serbian Karađorđević dynasty. In response to perceived Serbian domination over Montenegro, the Greens initiated several revolts in the 1920s.

=== Interwar Yugoslavia ===
Modern reconstruction of the flag used by Montenegrin Greens during the 1920s to 1940s.

Montenegro possessed little power and had little influence in the new Kingdom of Serbs, Croats and Slovenes. Power was being concentrated in Belgrade and had shifted away from Cetinje, which was relegated to the status of provincial irrelevance. The Podgorica Assembly, the Christmas Uprising and the loss of institutions and symbols of Montenegro’s statehood had collectively caused significant grievances, and King Alexander's decision to place the Montenegrin Church under the jurisdiction of the Serbian patriarch in Belgrade was a further insult to Montenegrin pride. The early postwar period was characterized by intense armed struggle within Montenegro, economic marginalization and the formation of new political parties. The Greens channeled their support towards two sources – the Montenegrin Federalist Party and the emergent Communist Party of Yugoslavia.

The Montenegrin Federalist Party was the only political organization in Montenegro that did not have its headquarters in Belgrade. The party’s theoretician, Sekula Drljević, promoted ideas of a separate Montenegrin ethnicity (ideas that become more extreme throughout the 1930s), arguing that the Montenegrins were of Illyrian as opposed to Slavic descent and that the Serb and Montenegrin mentalities were so different as to be irreconcilable. He wrote:

Races are communities of blood, whereas people are creatures of history. With their language, the Montenegrin people belong to the Slavic linguistic community. By their blood, however, they belong [to the Dinaric peoples]. According to the contemporary science of European races, [Dinaric] peoples are descended from the Illyrians. Hence, not just the kinship, but the identity of certain cultural forms among the Dinaric peoples, all the way from Albanians to South Tyroleans, who are Germanized Illyrians.

Sekula Drljević	Savić Marković

It was, however, the Communist Party that made inroads into Montenegrin political life. Most importantly, the Montenegrin communists dropped their initial commitment to Yugoslav unitarism, instead embracing Lenin’s principle of self-determination. Thus, the Montenegrin communist party began its struggle for an "independent Soviet Republic of Montenegro as part of the future Balkan Federation". The party attracted the support of many Greens and, in the 1920 elections, won 37.99 per cent of the popular vote in Montenegro, which would influence its later commitment to recognizing Montenegrins as a separate nation. It was, however, outlawed in 1921 and was unable to continue its political activities through democratic channels. The party formally recognized Montenegrins as an oppressed nation at their 4th Congress in Dresden.

Democracy was proving to be unworkable in Yugoslavia, and King Alexander imposed the 6 January Dictatorship in 1929, following a series of grim events including the murder in parliament of Croatian Peasant Party leader Stjepan Radić in June 1928. Intended to mitigate the intensifying political crisis, Alexander suspended the constitution, banned political parties and installed his own government. Many opposition politicians were arrested and imprisoned, serving to isolate Yugoslavia’s non-Serbs further. In an attempt to create a genuine Yugoslav identity, all nationalist sentiment was crushed and Yugoslavism aggressively imposed from above. Montenegro ceased to exist as a geographical term, its territory becoming instead largely incorporated into the Zeta Banovina. Following the murder of King Alexander in 1934 and the Cvetković–Maček Agreement in 1939, the Montenegrin Federalist Party supported the agreement, believing it would lead to greater independence for Montenegro. However, a status such as that achieved by the Croats with the Banovina of Croatia would fail to materialize for the Montenegrins.

=== World War II ===
Following the April War and the occupation of Yugoslavia by the Axis forces, nationalist Montenegrin Federalist Party offered to collaborate with the Italian Fascists, demanding a "Greater Montenegro" from Neretva river in Herzegovina to Mata in Albania; it would also include Metohija and Sandžak. A much smaller "Kingdom of Montenegro" was proclaimed on Saint Peter's Day Assembly on 12 July 1941, with the territorial claims of the Ustaše and Albanians being relatively more favoured by the Nazis. King Nicholas I' grandson and successor as heir to the throne, Prince Michael of Montenegro, was invited to be its King and puppet head of state, but he vigorously refused claiming that he would not cooperate with Nazis. The restored Montenegro lost Metohija and its eastern lands to a Greater Albania, but managed to gain the Serbian part of Sandžak. All other political parties were outlawed and a dictatorship under Sekula Drljević under Italian protection was proclaimed. A number of Montenegrin Federalist Party members, headed by Novica Radović, opposed this decision, because the territorial claims were not accepted and it failed to reinstate the Petrović-Njegoš dynasty.

Only a day after the puppet state of Montenegro was proclaimed, Partisans staged the 13 July Uprising, and the Montenegrin Federalist Army went to exile. It reorganised in Zagreb, the Independent State of Croatia's capital, as the Montenegrin State Council aimed at eventually creating an independent and large national state of the Montenegrin people. It associated itself with the Ustaše and aided their regime.

In 1945, Montenegrin Federalist Party formed its own Montenegrin People's Army out of former Chetniks led by Pavle Đurišić who broke his allegiance to Draža Mihailović and wanted to retreat to Slovenia in return for nominal recognition of Drljević's movement. However, this alliance between Drljević and Đurišić was short-lived and ended with Battle of Lijevče Field between the Ustaše and Đurišić's troops. With the impending Allied victory in 1945, Montenegrin Federalist Party dispersed, retreating with other Axis collaborators in late 1945 after its own Montenegrin Army turned against it.

=== Socialist Yugoslavia ===
After World War II and the rise of the Yugoslav Partisans to power in Yugoslavia under Josip Broz Tito, Montenegrin nationalism subsided for thirty years as a result of efforts by Yugoslavia's government to placate Montenegrins. Such efforts included: creating a constituent republic of Montenegro within the Yugoslav federation, recognition of a Montenegrin nationality, sponsoring industrial development of the previously rural economy of Montenegro, by providing financial aid to Montenegro that was the poorest of the six constituent republics and including substantial numbers of Montenegrins within the civil service. Montenegrin nationalism arose again as a movement from 1966 to 1967 when an effort was initiated to resurrect the separate Montenegrin Orthodox Church.

After Tito's death in 1980, nationalism in Montenegro and elsewhere in Yugoslavia surged. Beginning in 1981, Montenegrin nationalism grew in strength with its supporters demanding more autonomy for Montenegro within Yugoslavia, however a government crackdown against Montenegrin nationalists between 1982 and 1984 stifled the nationalist movement's efforts.

=== Contemporary nationalism ===
During the collapse of communism and breakup of Yugoslavia from 1989 to 1991, SR Montenegro and its communist government found itself in a turmoil. The rise to power of Momir Bulatović who supported Serbian President Slobodan Milošević and unity with Serbia, quashed the efforts of the dissident tribes to move Montenegro away from Serbia. After Yugoslavia dissolved in 1991, the Montenegrin government continued to support unity with Serbia and Montenegrin soldiers took part in the wars against the seceding republics. During the Yugoslav Wars, Montenegro's President Bulatović sought to satisfy both Montenegrin and Serbian nationalist factions in Montenegro by supporting Montenegrin irredentist claims to Dubrovnik and Herzegovina that he stated were historically part of Montenegro. The Serbs of Eastern Herzegovina hold strong cultural connections with the people of Old Herzegovina in Montenegro. Serbian and Montenegrin reservist soldiers from the JNA entered Herzegovina in September 1991 in preparations for an attack on Dubrovnik. Many Montenegrins at the time supported the irredentist aim of unification of Dubrovnik with Montenegro. During the Yugoslav Wars, Montenegrin Prime Minister Milo Đukanović, then a supporter of President Bulatović and union with Serbia, supported irredentist claims upon Croatia, claiming that Montenegro's post-World War II borders (the current borders of Montenegro) were designed by "semi-skilled Bolshevik cartographers" and Đukanović declared that Montenegro should "draw demarcation lines vis-à-vis the Croats once and for all".

Milo Đukanović	Ranko Krivokapić

Dissatisfaction with perceived domination from Serbian circles resulted in Montenegrin nationalism becoming a strong movement in Montenegro. The 1992 referendum was held to determine whether Montenegrins should remain united with Serbia or be independent resulting in 96.82 percent of Montenegrins preferring to remain in a union with Serbia versus 3.18 percent preferring independence. Frustration with the union with Serbia grew in the 1990s in response to FR Yugoslavia becoming an international pariah due to its involvement in the Yugoslav Wars, and frustration over Serbian nationalists dismissal of Montenegrin culture as being a sub-sect of Serbian culture. By 1997 most Montenegrins desired looser ties with Serbia and closer relations with the European Union. By the 1997 presidential election, Montenegrin Prime Minister Milo Đukanović had abandoned his previous support for Montenegrin unity with Serbia, and ran against pro-Serbian President Bulatović. The election of Milo Đukanović as President of Montenegro in 1998 resulted in the ascendance of a Montenegrin nationalist government to power and a fundamental change of attitude by the Montenegrin government to the Serbian government of Slobodan Milošević. Similar to the violence between the Greens and the Whites after World War I, violent confrontations occurred between supporters of Đukanović and pro-unity President Bulatović. The Montenegrin government refused to support federal government actions in the Kosovo War of 1999, and the Montenegrin government officially declared its neutrality in the conflict, resulting in NATO forces focusing air strikes on Serbia alone, although some federal military targets in Montenegro were hit.

James Minahan claims that the causes that resulted in the development of contemporary Montenegrin nationalism have been dated back to the mid-14th century when Montenegro first became a sovereign state. While Montenegrins have been regarded as a subgroup of Serbs, the independence of Montenegro during the period of Ottoman rule over Serbia resulted in a profoundly different culture emerging in Montenegro as compared with Serbia. Montenegro at this time developed into a tribal warrior society that was quite different from the culture of Ottoman-controlled Serbia.

=== Montenegrin nationalist political entities ===
Currently:

- Democratic Party of Socialists (since 2000s)
- Liberal Party of Montenegro (since 2004)
- Social Democrats of Montenegro (since 2015)
- Patriotic Komitas Union of Montenegro (since 2020)
- Civil Initiative "21 of May" (since 2021)
- New Left (founded in 2018) (since 2021)
- Social Democratic Party (factions, since 1993)

Historical:

- Montenegrin Greens (1918–1922, 1940s)
- Montenegrin Federalist Party (1922–1945)
- Liberal Alliance of Montenegro (civic, 1990–2005)
- People's Concord of Montenegro (civic, 2001–2006)
- Liberal Democrats of Montenegro (2001–2006)
- Civic Party of Montenegro (factions, 2002–2010)
- The Montenegrin (2014–2018, 2020–2021)

=== Language secessionism ===
The idea of a standardized Montenegrin language separate from the Serbian language appeared in the after the breakup of Yugoslavia, through proponents of Montenegrin independence from the State Union. By 1993, a number of Montenegrin intellectuals were claiming that Montenegrin was a separate language and should be recognized as such. The central aspect to this claim was that the Montenegrin language required the use of three extra sounds (and thus characters), and that therefore the Montenegrin alphabet is composed of 33 characters, as opposed to the 30 used in the Serbian, Bosnian and Croatian alphabets. In 1994, the Montenegrin PEN Center published its Declaration on the Endangerment of Montenegrin Culture, People and State, the central claim of which was to highlight what it argued was the attempted assimilation and destruction of all aspects of Montenegrin cultural identity. In Article 5 of the declaration, it is stated that, "the Constitution, among other things, declares Serbian as the language of the Montenegrins, in spite of the fact that the Montenegrin language has its own history and confirmation in literature". That the Montenegrin language is described in the constitution as Serbian of the ijekavian dialect, they argued, was just one of many examples of the marginalization of Montenegrin identity. Central to this argument was the claim that the Montenegrin language, despite forming the basis for the Serbian, Croatian, Bosnian and Montenegrin languages, had been largely destroyed by Belgrade and Zagreb, which had imposed the standard Serbo-Croatian, following the Novi Sad Agreement in 1954.

During the 2003 population census in Montenegro, the issue of the Montenegrin language was contentious and hotly debated. In March 2004, the Montenegrin education council proposed changing the official language of the republic from Serbian to Maternji jezik (mother tongue). The proposal caused outrage among ethnic Serbs, who saw it as an attempt by the Montenegrin government to marginalize aspects of Serbian identity. Jevrem Brković, president of the Doclean Academy of Sciences and Arts, hailed attempts to change the name of the language as a "transitional phase to the establishment of the Montenegrin language in the constitution of the republic".

The Constitution of Montenegro from 2007 states that Montenegrin is the official language of the country, while Bosnian, Croatian, Serbian and Albanian are languages in official use.

== See also ==
- Montenegrins
- The Greens
- Christmas Uprising
- Montenegrin independence referendum
