= Slavko Perović =

Montenegrin politician

- Славко Перовић

Leader of Liberal Alliance of Montenegro
- In office 1990–1999
- Succeeded by: Miroslav Vicković

Member of Parliament
- In office 1992–2002

Personal details
- Born: 2 August 1954 (age 72) Cetinje, FPR Yugoslavia (now Montenegro)
- Party: Liberal Alliance of Montenegro (1990–2005)
- Other political affiliations: League of Communists (1980–1990); Union of Reform Forces (1990–1991); Popular Unity Coalition (1996–1998)
- Education: University of Montenegro
- Profession: Lawyer, journalist, politician

Slavko Perović (Montenegrin Cyrillic: Славко Перовић; born 2 August 1954) is a Montenegrin politician. He is best known as a co-founder and former leader of Liberal Alliance of Montenegro (LSCG), former party that was fighting for independence of Montenegro and promoting liberalism in Montenegro throughout the 1990s and early 2000s.

== Early life ==
Perović was born and raised in Cetinje, People's Republic of Montenegro, Federal People's Republic of Yugoslavia to father Vukašin Perović, a pre-War journalist and Partisan, who also published five novels and poema, and mother Zoraida (b. Nakićenović) from Kuti (Herceg Novi), a housewife. He graduated from Veljko Vlahović University's Faculty of Law in 1978 in Titograd. He passed the court attorney exam in Belgrade, Socialist Republic of Serbia a year later, and earned his Master's Degree at the International University Centre in Dubrovnik, Socialist Republic of Croatia. As a student, he was active in a number of social projects, including Mi youth magazine, culture magazine Ars, and Radio Cetinje.

== Political career ==
=== Liberal Alliance ===
In 1990, he was one of the founders of Liberal Alliance of Montenegro (LSCG), a party formed in Cetinje with goals of promoting liberalism the idea of Montenegrin independence, and opposing Montenegrin involvement in Yugoslav Wars, imposed by the ruling Democratic Party of Socialists of Montenegro. In the early 1990, Perović and his LSCG was active as the Union of Reform Forces of Yugoslavia' Montenegrin branch. Originally he was the Executive Committee president, but in 1991, he was elected for the party's President. Perović was also a LSCG representative in Parliament of Montenegro since 1990.

In 1996, Perović initiated the creation of the Narodna Sloga ("Popular Unity") coalition with the People's Party (NS), in order to reconcile Montenegrins and Serbs in Montenegro, and return public's attention to everyday problems Montenegro was facing. Because of his opposition political activity, in 1988 he was fired from his position in the Cetinje Literary Hall by the Montenegrin Government. The official reason for the action was a communist author's book that Perović did not allow to be printed in Cetinje. During the Yugoslav Wars, Perović and his party were the strongest political subject in Montenegro opposing the armed conflict, organizing multiple anti-war rallies.

After the parliamentary elections in October 2002, Perović retired from his position in the LSCG, but remained active in politics.

== See also ==
- Liberal Alliance of Montenegro
- Liberalism in Montenegro
- Montenegrin nationalism
