= Ljubiša Stanković =

Montenegrin diplomat (born 1960)

Ljubiša Stanković (Serbian Cyrillic: Љубиша Станковић; born June 1, 1960) is a doctor in signal processing, while also being the former Rector (2003–2008) and University Board President (2008–2011) for the University of Montenegro. Since March 27, 2011 he is also the Ambassador of Montenegro to the United Kingdom.

Stanković was born in Andrijevica, Montenegro. In 2011, he was elected to the European Academy of Arts and Sciences. In 2012, he was elected a member of Academia Europaea.

== See also ==
- Modified Wigner distribution function
