= Republic of Montenegro (1992–2006) =

Federal unit of Yugoslavia/Serbia & Montenegro between 1992 and 2006

Republic of Montenegro Република Црна Гора Republika Crna Gora
- 1992–2006
- Flag; Top: 1993–2004; Bottom: 2004–2006 Coat of arms Top: 1992–2004; Bottom: 2004–2006
- Anthem: "Хеј, Словени" "Hej, Sloveni" (English: "Hey, Slavs") (1992–2004) Ој, свијетла мајска зоро Oj, svijetla majska zoro (English: "Oh, Bright Dawn of May") (2004–2006)
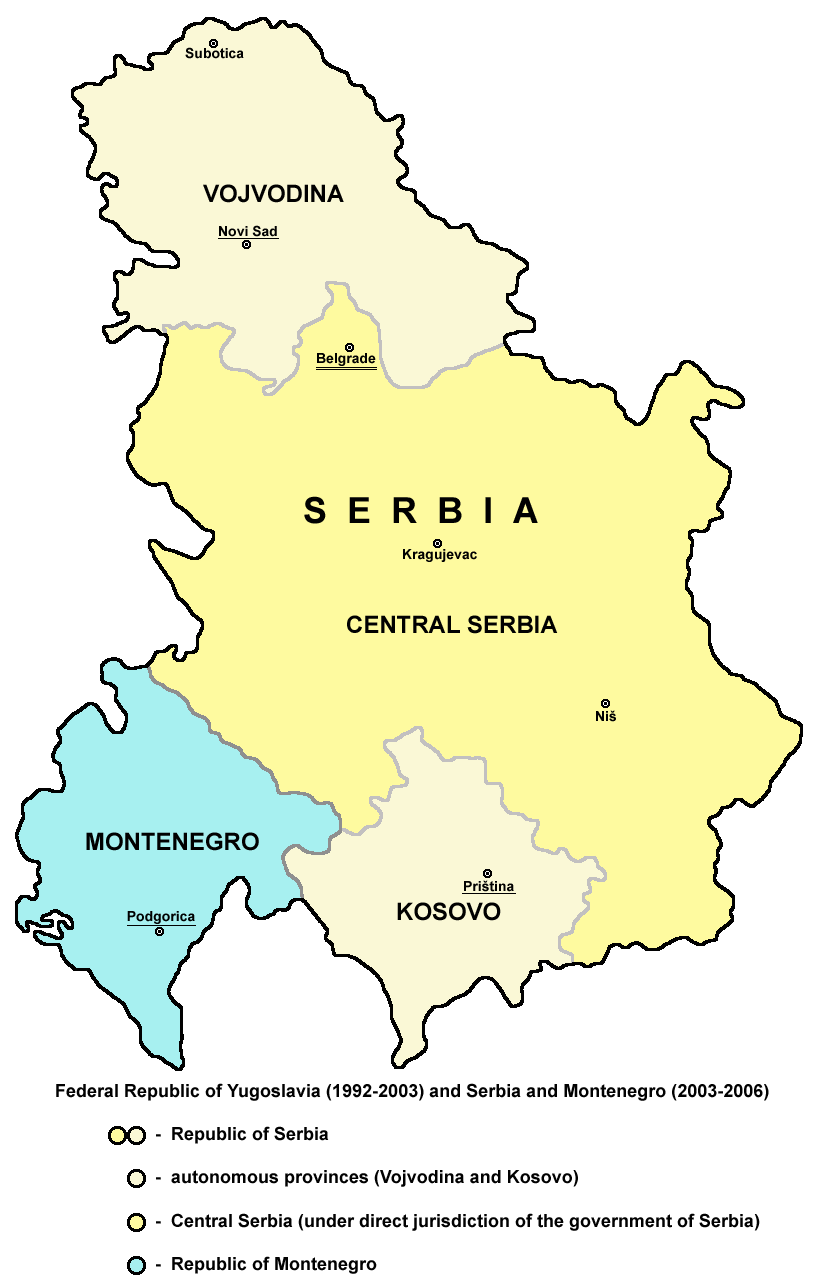
- Subdivisions of Serbia and Montenegro: Republic of Serbia; Autonomous provinces of Serbia; Republic of Montenegro
- Status: Constituent state of Serbia and Montenegro
- Capital: Podgorica; Cetinje (Royal Capital)
- Official languages: Serbian of Ijekavian pronunciation
- Demonym: Montenegrin
- Government: Dominant-party parliamentary republic
- President
  - 1992–1998 (first): Momir Bulatović
  - 2002–2006 (last): Filip Vujanović
- Prime Minister
  - 1992–1998 (first): Milo Đukanović
  - 2003–2006 (last): Milo Đukanović
- Legislature: Assembly
- History
  - Established: 28 April 1992
  - Constitution adopted: 12 October 1992
  - State Union of Serbia and Montenegro: 4 February 2003
  - Independence: 3 June 2006

Area
- 2006: 13,812 km^{2} (5,333 sq mi)

Population
  - 2002: 650,000
  - 1999: 630,000
- Currency: Yugoslav Dinar (1992–1996); Deutsche Mark (1996–2002); Euro (2002–2006)
- ISO 3166 code: CS-CG
Preceded by	Succeeded by
Socialist Republic of Montenegro	Montenegro
- Today part of: Montenegro

The Republic of Montenegro (Serbian: Република Црна Гора / Republika Crna Gora) was a constituent federated state of the Federal Republic of Yugoslavia and then Serbia and Montenegro between 1992 and 2006. The declaration of independence of Montenegro in 2006 ended the ex-Yugoslav state. After the collapse of the Socialist Federal Republic of Yugoslavia (SFRY), the remaining republics of Montenegro and Serbia agreed to the formation of the Federal Republic of Yugoslavia (FRY) which officially abandoned communism and endorsed liberal institutions. Montenegro was a constituent republic of the FRY and its successor state until June 2006 when Montenegro declared independence from Serbia and Montenegro following the 2006 Montenegrin independence referendum.

== History ==
=== Federal Republic of Yugoslavia ===
Upon entry into the FRY, Montenegro was led by President Momir Bulatović, a former member of the Communist Party in Yugoslavia and an ally of Serbian President Slobodan Milošević, whom Bulatović helped gain power during the Anti-Bureaucratic Revolution, in which he and Milošević gained power in their respective republics. In the final years of the SFRY's existence, Bulatović had supported Milošević's demands for a "one-member, one-vote" system in the Communist party congress which would have given numerical superiority to their cohort in the congress. This fostered the collapse of the Communist Party and later the SFRY. Bulatović began to show reluctance to remain in a union with Serbia when countries like Italy offered Montenegro the possibility of quick access into the European Community if Montenegro separated from Yugoslavia. However, Bulatović's brief endorsement of Montenegrin independence ended due to pressure from Serbia. In 1992, Montenegro joined the FRY after a referendum took place on 1 March of that year. In the same year, the capital Titograd (named after former Yugoslav leader Josip Broz Tito) was renamed to its pre-communist name of Podgorica. In 1993, Montenegro abandoned its former Communist-era flag and adopted a plain tricolour, similar to Serbia's but longer, and with a lighter blue for its centre stripe, marking a distinction between the two republics which had exactly the same flag during the Communist era. This flag would be in place until 2004.

Montenegro's continued union with Serbia provided legitimacy to the continuation of a Yugoslav state, important to Serbia as the continuation of a Yugoslav state would allow the federation to lay claim to former Yugoslav territory in Bosnia and Herzegovina and Croatia populated by Serbs. Also Montenegro had access to the sea which kept Serbia's sovereign body from being landlocked and allowed for a navy (merchant and military) to exist. Over time, the domineering nature of President Milošević and his allies within the federation provoked ordinary Montenegrins to shift towards independence, while creating a growing desire for regime change and support for opposition within Serbia. Strain with Serbia over economic policy caused Montenegro to adopt the Deutsche Mark in 1996 while waiting for the European Community to formalise a European currency. After Bulatović stepped down as Montenegrin president in 1998, the new president Milo Đukanović opposed Milošević (now Yugoslav President) and set Montenegro on a course to independence.

=== Confederacy and independence ===
On 6 August 1999, Montenegro drafted a plan wherein Yugoslavia would have been supplanted by the "Association of the States of Serbia and Montenegro", intended to also grant Montenegro autonomy over its foreign ministry, currency, and military for eventual secession. The Clinton administration expressed support, but urged Montenegro to remain in union. On 15 March, 2002, under the European Union's auspices, an agreement was formed that would officially dissolve Yugoslavia. The agreement permitted Montenegro to continue to use the Euro instead of the Yugoslav dinar. In 2003, the FR Yugoslavia became a confederacy under the name "Serbia and Montenegro" and granted more autonomy to Montenegro with only defense and foreign policy remaining a responsibility for the central government. A new flag and emblem were adopted in 2004. In 2006, Montenegro held an independence referendum. 55% voted in favor of independence, but this was only a narrow victory for independence. Montenegro officially declared independence in June 2006, causing Serbia to become independent, ending the last federal union of the former Yugoslavia dating back to 1918.

== See also ==
- Yugoslav Wars
