= Democratic Party of Socialists of Montenegro =

Montenegrin political party

Democratic Party of Socialists Демократска партија социјалиста Demokratska partija socijalista
- President: Danijel Živković
- Vice Presidents: Ivan Vuković; Jevto Eraković; Aleksandra Vuković Kuč; Abaz Dizdarević
- Secretary General: Aleksandar Bogdanović
- Founders: Momir Bulatović; Milo Đukanović; Svetozar Marović
- Founded: 22 June 1991; 35 years ago
- Preceded by: League of Communists of Montenegro
- Headquarters: Podgorica
- Ideology: Social democracy Social liberalism Populism; Montenegrin nationalism Pro-Europeanism; 1991–1997: Democratic socialism Serbian-Montenegrin unionism
- Political position: Centre to centre-left 1991–1997: Left-wing
- National affiliation: European Montenegro (1998–2016); Together! For a future that belongs to you! (2023)
- European affiliation: Party of European Socialists (associate)
- International affiliation: Progressive Alliance; Socialist International
- Colours: Purple (Note: Since 2021); Orange (Note: Before 2021)
- Parliament: 16 / 81
- Mayors: 4 / 25
- Local Parliaments: 223 / 844

Website
- dps.me
- Politics of Montenegro; Political parties; Elections; A: The DPS has been a catch-all party since its formation, but had been placed politically as left-wing until 1997, and after that as centre, or centre-left, with a wing which is populist and nationalist.

The Democratic Party of Socialists of Montenegro (Montenegrin: Демократска партија социјалиста Црне Горе, romanized: Demokratska partija socijalista Crne Gore, DPS) is a social democratic and populist political party in Montenegro. A former long-time ruling party sitting at the opposition for the first time since 2020, it was formed on 22 June 1991 as the successor of the League of Communists of Montenegro, which had governed Montenegro within the Socialist Federal Republic of Yugoslavia since World War II, and has remained a major force in the country ever since. The party is a member of the Socialist International and the Progressive Alliance, and an associate of the Party of European Socialists. During the 1990s, DPS was the major centre-left social-democratic party in favour of Serbian–Montenegrin unionism. However, since 1997, the party has embraced Montenegrin independence and has been improving ties with the West, slowly turning into a catch-all party embracing Atlanticism, Montenegrin nationalism, neoliberalism, and pro-Europeanism.

Since its formation and the introduction of a multi-party system, the DPS has played a dominant role in Montenegrin politics, forming the backbone of every coalition government until the 2020 parliamentary election, when it entered the opposition. This marked the first time since 1945 that the party, including its predecessor incarnation, had not been in power. Prior to the 2020 election, the party strongly supported the controversial religious freedom law, causing tensions across Montenegro and the rise of the Serbian Orthodox Church in Montenegrin politics. The Church gaining more power gave motivation for the ethnic nationalist faction to rise in the party, with which some members such as the civic nationalist Filip Vujanović had issues since 2011. The ethnic nationalist wing of the party also supported renewing the Montenegrin Orthodox Church, which led to the DPS being accused of creating a "party church".

== History ==
Slobodan Milošević	Momir Bulatović

=== Background: Dissolution of the SKCG and foundation of the DPS (1989–1996) ===
The history of the DPS begins with the political turmoil in Yugoslavia in the late 1980s. After Slobodan Milošević seized power in the League of Communists of Serbia, he went on to organize rallies that eventually ousted the leaderships of the League of Communists of Yugoslavia local branches in Vojvodina, Kosovo, and Montenegro. This series of events, collectively known as the Anti-bureaucratic revolution, swept into power new party leadership in Montenegro, one allied with Milošević, personified in Momir Bulatović, Milo Đukanović, and Svetozar Marović.

Official party logo stylized in Cyrillic script as was used during the 1990s

Under this new leadership, the League of Communists of Montenegro won by a landslide in the 1990 Montenegrin general election, the first relatively free multi-party election in Socialist Montenegro, held in December 1990, taking 83 out of 125 seats in the Parliament of Montenegro. The party had a significant head start in the elections, as it had the entire established party structure at its disposal, while newly formed competition had to start from scratch. The party changed its name to the Democratic Party of Socialists of Montenegro (Demokratska partija Crne Gore) on 22 June 1991.

With Bulatović as the president, the DPS closely aligned Montenegro with Serbia and the policies of Slobodan Milošević. The party was firmly in power during the turbulent early 1990s, which saw the breakup of Yugoslavia and the beginning of the Yugoslav Wars. During these years, the party endorsed a union and close relations with Serbia, its sole partner in the Federal Republic of Yugoslavia (FRY) from 1992. The party maintained the support of the electorate in this difficult period for Montenegro, winning both the 1992–1993 and 1996 parliamentary elections.

=== Split between Bulatović and Đukanović 1997–2000) ===
Milo Đukanović	Svetozar Marović

On July 11, 1997, the party's national committee Glavni odbor (GO) held a closed doors session after which the committee selected Milica Pejanović-Đurišić to replace Bulatović as the party president. The party split had enormous implications, making a political confrontation between Đukanović and Bulatović inevitable. This manifested in the 1997 Montenegrin presidential election held in October, which Đukanović won by a thin margin. Bulatović went on to form the Socialist People's Party of Montenegro (SNP) out of his defeated DPS faction, whose platform held a unionist position on the question of Yugoslavia and its short-lived successor state, Serbia and Montenegro. Meanwhile, Đukanović became a fierce opponent of Slobodan Milošević politics.

As a result of Đukanović's relationship with the United States, Montenegro received significant amounts of economic aid during this period, and negotiated limitations on NATO bombings of its territory in 1999, whereas the rest of Yugoslavia was subject to significantly heavier attacks. The DPS government gradually severed ties with Serbia by taking control over customs and the economy, introducing first the Deutsche mark, and subsequently the euro as legal tender, and generally reducing the influence of the federal government in Montenegro.

=== Montenegrin independence (2000–2006) ===
Following the overthrow of Slobodan Milošević on 5 October 2000, the DPS showed signs of greater support for Montenegrin independence. The campaign for the 2002 parliamentary elections was devoted to the question of Montenegro's independence. The European Union mediated negotiations between the DPS and the newly elected democratic government in Serbia in 2003 imposed a three-year waiting period before an independence referendum could be held. The transitional period saw the transformation of the FR Yugoslavia to a loose union called Serbia and Montenegro. During the existence of the union state, the party congress added the goal of a "democratic, internationally-recognized, independent Montenegro" to its official platform. The party then spearheaded the pro-independence campaign ahead of Montenegro's referendum in 2006. With 55.5% of voters opting for independence, Montenegro became an independent state on 3 June 2006.

=== Đukanović era (2006–2022) ===
Former logo of the party used from the late 1990s until 2021

At the 2006 Montenegrin parliamentary election as well as the subsequent 2009 and 2012 parliamentary elections, the DPS confirmed its position as the strongest political party in Montenegro. The party has formed the basis of all parliamentary majorities and has been the backbone of all government cabinets since independence, usually with its now traditional ally the Social Democratic Party of Montenegro and ethnic minority parties. Former party vice-president Filip Vujanović served as the president of Montenegro for three terms from 2002 until 2018, having won presidential elections in 2003, 2008, and 2013, being succeeded by party leader Milo Đukanović who became president in 2018.

Đukanović was the party president and its undisputed authority, serving either as Prime Minister or President of Montenegro from 1991 to 2006, 2008 to 2010 and 2012 to 2016. In 2006, the party leadership chose Željko Šturanović, former Minister of Justice, to succeed Đukanović as Prime Minister, until his resignation on 31 January 2008 for health reasons, whereupon Đukanović replaced him, only to resign again in December 2010 while retaining his role as DPS party leader. After winning the 2012 parliamentary elections, Đukanović once again assumed the position of Prime Minister. In 2015, the centre-left Social Democratic Party left the coalition with the DPS, accusing ruling party of corruption and abuse of power.

At the 2020 parliamentary election, DPS decided to run independently, with single candidate spot on the electoral list given to the nationalist Liberal Party of Montenegro. The election eventually resulted in a victory for the opposition parties and the fall of the authoritarian DPS, after governing the country for 30 years, since the introduction of the multi-party system in 1990.

After the party lost the local election in the town of Pljevlja, Serb symbols were spray-painted on the local Islamic community headquarters, apparently aiming to stir religious and national hatred.

=== Post-Đukanović era (2023–present) ===
In 2023, the presidential elections resulted in Milatović defeating Đukanović in a landslide, becoming the first elected president not being a member of the DPS since introduction of the multi-party system in 1990. It was the first time a runoff vote was held since the 1997 election, making it first presidential runoff since Montenegro gained independence in 2006, also the first election since 1997 where an incumbent president actively seeking reelection was denied a second term. Stefan Löfven, President of the European Socialists, had endorsed Đukanović prior to the elections. In the aftermath, Đukanović resigned as President of DPS ending his 24 years tenure. Danijel Živković was elected as his successor. The presidential election was followed by the 2023 Montenegrin parliamentary election, held on 11 June 2023. Europe Now! (PES) won a plurality of seats while DPS came in second after losing seats and were once again placed in opposition.

DPS won a plurality of seats in the elections to the City Assembly of Podgorica held in 2024, with Živković saying it was “time to return the DPS to power”. In December 2024, several former ministers and high-ranking officials from the ranks of the DPS were arrested and charged with embezzlement and corruption. In the same month DPS started boycotting parliament, accusing PES of taking over the powers of the Constitutional Court and delaying the 2025 budget bill adoption, after the PES led constitutional committee decided to terminate the employment of Constitutional Court judge Dragana Djurovic. DPS ended its boycott following an EU-brokered agreement in March 2025.

== Ideology ==
The party evolved from the League of Communists of Montenegro as a reformist force after Yugoslavia's dissolution. In the 1990s, party was based on democratic socialism, social democracy, and Serbian–Montenegrin unionism. In the 2000s, the party switched policy towards a common state with Serbia and would become the main proponent of the independence of Montenegro in 2006. In the 2010s and 2020s, the party was characterized by populist, big tent politics with a centre-left lean, with elements of nationalism and a pro-European stance towards European integration. The DPS also followed most mainstream, centre-left, social-democratic parties since the 1980s embracing Third Way economics and politics while being described as one of the most radical neoliberal centre-left parties.

In foreign policy, the party maintains Atlanticist and Europeanist positions, condemning Russian aggression against Ukraine and positioning itself in an anti-Russian role. According to some analysts, the DPS, together with its coalition partners, as well some newly founded nationalist parties, started pushing the narrative of "Montenegro being left to Serbia by the United States and the EU", but these assessments have no foundation in the post-Ukrainian invasion international scenario.

After its ninth congress in November 2019, the DPS dominantly increased its ethnic Montenegrin nationalist discourse by officially and institutionally supporting the rights of the canonically unrecognized Montenegrin Orthodox Church, announcing its "re-establishment". According to the ODIHR and Freedom House reports that the party established a hybrid regime as well an electoral authoritarian system. After it was placed in opposition, DPS said that the Krivokapić Cabinet, a big tent ruling coalition, represents "threat for Montenegrin statehood and its independence". The period before the 2020 parliamentary election was marked by the high polarization of the electorate. Several corruption scandals of the ruling party triggered 2019 Montenegrin anti-corruption protests, while a controversial religion law sparked another wave of protests. Analysts considered DPS and its three decade rule to have been a kleptocratic and authoritarian regime. Although the elections held were considered competitive, they were criticized for a lack of independent media and abuse of state resources by DPS.

== Presidents of the Democratic Party of Socialists ==
No.	President	Age	Term start	Term end	Time in office
1	Momir Bulatović	1956–2019	22 June 1991	19 October 1997	6 years, 119 days
2	Milica Pejanović	born 1959	19 October 1997	31 October 1998	1 year, 12 days
3	Milo Đukanović	born 1962	31 October 1998	6 April 2023	24 years, 157 days
4	Danijel Živković	born 1987	6 April 2023	Incumbent	3 years, 188 days

== Election results ==
=== Parliamentary elections ===
Election	Party leader	Performance				Alliance	Rank	Government
Election	Party leader	Votes	%	Seats	+/–	Alliance	Rank	Government
1990	Momir Bulatović	171,316	56.18%	83 / 125	New	-	1st	Majority
1992	Momir Bulatović	126,083	42.66%	46 / 85	▼37	-	1st	Majority
1996	Momir Bulatović	150,237	49.92%	45 / 71	▼1	-	1st	Majority
1998	Milica Pejanović	170,080	48.87%	32 / 78	▼13	ECG	1st	Majority
2001	Milo Đukanović	153,946	42.04%	30 / 77	▼2	ECG	1st	Coalition
2002	Milo Đukanović	167,166	48.00%	31 / 75	▲1	ECG	1st	Majority
2006	Milo Đukanović	164,737	48.62%	32 / 81	▲1	ECG	1st	Majority
2009	Milo Đukanović	168,290	51.94%	35 / 81	▲3	ECG	1st	Majority
2012	Milo Đukanović	165,380	45.60%	32 / 81	▼3	ECG	1st	Coalition
2016	Milo Đukanović	158,490	41.41%	35 / 81	▲3	-	1st	Coalition
2020	Milo Đukanović	143,548	35.06%	29 / 81	▼6	-	1st	Opposition 2020–22
2020	Milo Đukanović	143,548	35.06%	29 / 81	▼6	-	1st	Support 2022
2020	Milo Đukanović	143,548	35.06%	29 / 81	▼6	-	1st	Opposition 2022–23
2023	Danijel Živković	70,228	23.22%	17 / 81	▼12	Together!	2nd	Opposition

=== Presidential elections ===
President of Montenegro
Year	Candidate	1st round popular votes		% of popular votes	2nd round popular votes		% of popular votes
1990	Momir Bulatović	1st	170,092	42.22%	1st	203,616	76.1
1992	Momir Bulatović	1st	123,183	42.8%	1st	158,722	63.4
1997	Milo Đukanović	2nd	145,348	46.71%	1st	174,745	50.79
2003	Filip Vujanović	1st	139,574	64.2%	—N/a	—	—
2008	Filip Vujanović	1st	171,118	51.89%	—N/a	—	—
2013	Filip Vujanović	1st	161,940	51.21%	—N/a	—	—
2018	Milo Đukanović	1st	180,274	53.90%	—N/a	—	—
2023	Milo Đukanović	1st	119,685	35.37%	2nd	154,769	41.12%

=== Yugoslav elections ===
Parliament of FR Yugoslavia
Year	Popular vote	% of popular vote	Seats	Montenegrin seats	±	Government	Ballot carrier
1992	160,040	68.6%	23 / 136	23 / 30	▲23	Coalition	Miloš Radulović
1992	130,431	47.3%	17 / 138	17 / 30	▼6	Coalition	Radoje Kontić
1996	146,221	50.8%	20 / 138	20 / 30	▲3	Coalition	Radoje Kontić
2000	Election boycotted		0 / 138	0 / 30	▼20	Election boycotted	

== Positions held ==
President of Montenegro	Years
Momir Bulatović	1990–1997
Milo Đukanović	1998–2003; 2018–2023
Filip Vujanović	2003–2018
Prime Minister of Montenegro	Years
Milo Đukanović	1991–1998; 2003–2006; 2008–2010; 2012–2016
Filip Vujanović	1998–2003
Željko Šturanović	2006–2008
Igor Lukšić	2010–2012
Duško Marković	2016–2020
President of the Parliament of Montenegro	Years
Risto Vukčević	1992–1994
Svetozar Marović	1994–2001
Filip Vujanović	2002–2003

President of the Presidency of Yugoslavia	Years
Branko Kostić	1991–1992
President of the Chamber of Republics of the Federal Assembly of Yugoslavia	Years
Miloš Radulović	1992–1996
Srđa Božović	1996–1997
Prime Minister of Serbia and Montenegro	Years
Radoje Kontić	1993–1998
Svetozar Marović	2003–2006
President of Serbia and Montenegro	Years
Svetozar Marović	2003–2006
