= Momir Bulatović =

First President of the Republic of Montenegro (1992–1998)

- Момир Булатовић
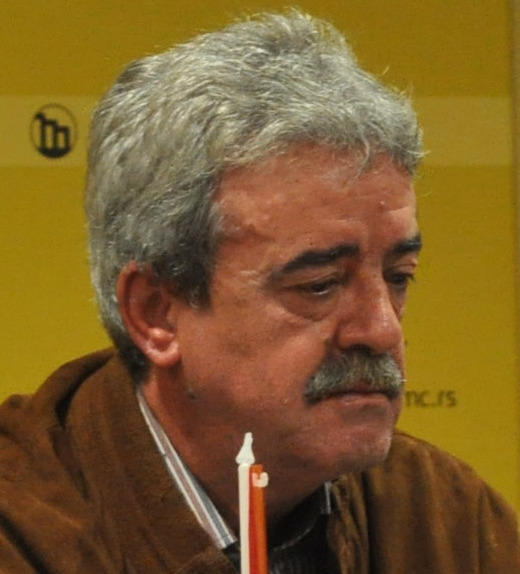
- Bulatović in 2015

3rd Prime Minister of the FR Yugoslavia
- In office 19 May 1998 – 4 November 2000
- President: Slobodan Milošević; Vojislav Koštunica
- Preceded by: Radoje Kontić
- Succeeded by: Zoran Žižić

1st President of Montenegro within FR Yugoslavia
- In office 23 December 1990 – 15 January 1998
- Prime Minister: Milo Đukanović
- President of FR Yugoslavia: Dobrica Ćosić; Zoran Lilić; Slobodan Milošević
- Preceded by: Branko Kostić (as President of the Presidency)
- Succeeded by: Milo Đukanović

President of the League of Communists of Montenegro
- In office 28 April 1989 – 22 June 1991
- Preceded by: Milica Pejanović-Đurišić
- Succeeded by: Office abolished

Personal details
- Born: 21 September 1956 Belgrade, PR Serbia, FPR Yugoslavia
- Died: 30 June 2019 (aged 62) Raći, Podgorica Municipality, Montenegro
- Party: SKJ (1980s–1991); DPS (1991–1997); SNP (1997–2001); NSS (2001–2009); NSD (2009–2019)
- Education: University of Montenegro
- Profession: Economist, politician

Momir Bulatović (Serbo-Croatian Cyrillic: Момир Булатовић; 21 September 1956 – 30 June 2019) was a Yugoslav and Montenegrin politician. He was the first president of the Republic of Montenegro from 1990 to 1998, after which he served as the Prime Minister of the Federal Republic of Yugoslavia from 1998 until 2000, when Slobodan Milošević was overthrown. He was a leader of the Democratic Party of Socialists of Montenegro from 1989 to 1997, when he split from DPS after a conflict with Milo Đukanović.

During his mandate as president of Montenegro within Yugoslavia, he oversaw the engagement of Montenegrin reservists in the Yugoslav People's Army in the siege of Dubrovnik as well as in the Bosnian War. According to Florence Hartmann, Bulatović was subject to an investigation by the International Criminal Tribunal for the former Yugoslavia (ICTY) for war crimes in Bosnia and Herzegovina, but was not charged. He was a defense witness in the trials of Slobodan Milošević, Radovan Karadžić, and Nikola Šainović at the ICTY.

== Early life ==
Bulatović was born in Belgrade as the son of a Yugoslav People's Army (JNA) officer who originated from Montenegro. The family lived in the Voždovac neighbourhood. Due to the nature of his father's job his family frequently relocated throughout Yugoslavia. When Momir was five years old, the family moved to Zadar in Croatia, where he completed his primary and secondary education.

In 1975 the 18-year-old Bulatović moved to Titograd to study at the Veljko Vlahović University's Faculty of Economics. According to Bulatović, he wanted to return to Belgrade for university studies, but his family did not have enough money to send him there, so he ended up in Titograd.

Upon graduating he continued as an assistant at the same university and soon earned a master's degree.

== Anti-bureaucratic revolution (1989) ==
In November 1988, while working as an assistant at the Faculty of Economics in Podgorica, Bulatović was named coordinator of the League of Communists of Montenegro. After the anti-bureaucratic revolution in January 1989, Bulatović was promoted to the presidency of the League of Communists of Montenegro.

With the breakup of Yugoslavia, Bulatović became president of Yugoslavia's Republic of Montenegro, serving in that position from 23 December 1990 to 15 January 1998. During his tenure, he was a loyal ally to Slobodan Milošević, and oversaw the Montenegrin reserve of the Yugoslav People's Army in the Croatian and Bosnian wars.

In the 1990, Yugoslav Communist party's congress, Bulatović supported Milošević's agenda of changing the party's voting system to a one-member-one-vote system which would give a numerical majority to Serbs. Montenegro also supported Serbia in opposing all reforms proposed by Slovenia that were deemed to be intended to devolve power to the republics. The Slovenian and Croatian communist factions abdicated the party in what they saw as an attempt by Milošević to create Serb hegemony in the party. The League of Communists of Yugoslavia collapsed, Bulatović followed the political changes in the other republics and made Montenegro a multi-party democracy and formed the Democratic Party of Socialists (DPS) with former communists.

== President of Montenegro (1990–1998) ==
=== Siege of Dubrovnik (1991) ===
On 1 October 1991, Peter Carington, 6th Baron Carrington came to Titograd and asked Bulatović if Dubrovnik was in danger of an attack by the Yugoslav People's Army. According to testimony by Nikola Samardžić to the ICTY, a member of Bulatović's cabinet, Bulatović promised Carrington that Dubrovnik would not be attacked. Just a few hours after meeting Carrington, Bulatović attended a meeting with several generals of the Yugoslav People's Army, including Pavle Strugar, after which Bulatović told Samardžić that "30,000 Ustashe are coming from Dubrovnik to seize the Bay of Kotor", and that a response was urgent. Bulatović ultimately participated in ordering an attempted annexation of Dubrovnik to Montenegro, additionally claiming that it was historically linked to Montenegro. After the war ended, Bulatović claimed that the attack on Dubrovnik was "the only way to prevent the conflict from spreading into Montenegro", but also asserted that the military gave the government of Montenegro "false information".

"Stjepan Mesić asked me back in 1993, 'What in God's name are you doing, why are you taking us over? Did you have any information how many of us were there?' I replied to him that Kadijević told me that there were 30,000 of them. [And] that for 30,000 close to our border we need to react with 60,000. Then Mesić told me that there were only 700 of them. We only found out later." -Bulatović for Vijesti on 31 September 2010.

=== Carrington's proposal (1991) ===
The siege of Dubrovnik, in addition to war crimes committed, had enormous consequences for Yugoslavia's international standing. The European Economic Community invited Carrington and representatives from Yugoslavia to negotiate a peace accord known as the Carrington plan on 19 October 1991, in The Hague. The proposal of a "loose federation of independent states" was a non-starter for Milošević, who preferred a centralized Yugoslavia with institutional powers in Belgrade. Bulatović, to the shock of Milošević and his own party members, agreed to Carrington's terms and even signed a draft of the plan during an overnight session of the Montenegrin parliament on October 17, arguing that it would secure Montenegro's interests and end the Yugoslav wars. Bulatović's signature potentially guaranteed Montenegro's legal right to secede from Yugoslavia, resulting in an almost explosive rift with the Yugoslav leadership in Belgrade. Borisav Jović contacted Bulatović about his support for the Carrington plan in disbelief, asking him if he had been paid off by the Croats, Austrians, or Italians. Bulatović claimed that the Carrington proposal offered Montenegro the Prevlaka peninsula, and that it guaranteed Montenegro would not be subject to sanctions. Furthermore, Montenegro was allegedly offered a large amount of aid from the West with Italian foreign minister Gianni De Michelis telling Bulatović that he "wanted to chart an independent course from Belgrade." In a follow-up session of the Montenegrin parliament on 24–25 October, parliament and party members ratified Bulatović's signature on the Carrington plan, making the accord more imminent.

However, in a sharp turn, the Narodna Stranka (People's Party) called for an emergency session in the Montenegrin parliament, during which Bulatović was accused of treason. Milo Đukanović defended Bulatović in the parliamentary hearing. Bulatović tried to make his own case, telling the parliament members "if servility and acceptance of everything coming from Belgrade is the criteria for good governance in Montenegro, then this nation doesn't need a government, elections, or political parties." Subsequently, Bulatović was invited to a meeting with Milošević and Jović in Belgrade; Bulatović described the meeting as "very explosive". As a result of the meeting, Milošević added a clause to Bulatović's Carrington commitment, such that a republic could decide to stay in Yugoslavia through a referendum. This resulted in the 1992 independence referendum, where voters in Montenegro decided to remain in the Federal Republic of Yugoslavia.

=== Muslim communities in Montenegro ===
"...yesterday in Pljevlja we were on the edge of an international conflict and all that negative energy could have turned against the Muslims such that the fate and existence of Muslims in Pljevlja could have ended that night. What a catastrophe that would be, from the point of our international position, there's absolutely no need to explain."

— Momir Bulatović on 7 August 1992.

With the war raging in Bosnia and Herzegovina, Bulatović faced the first serious threat of "spill-over" in the summer of in 1992, when Muslims in Pljevlja were subject to intimidation and violence. On 6 August 1992, a local warlord named Milika "Čeko" Dačević walked into Pljevlja's police headquarters to ask that a vehicle which was seized be returned to his personal envoy, threatening to "declare war" on Pljevlja. Although Bulatović described Dačević as someone "who hardly can be characterized as sane", over half of the police force turned themselves over to Dačević during his custody, essentially turning over the police station to Dačević's militia. In addition to the stand-off with Dačević, his militia included forces of the Kornjača brothers from Čajniče, who helped blocked off the town from a garrison of the Yugoslav People's Army (JNA). Duško Kornjača threatened to kill all of the Muslims in Pljevlja unless Dačević was released. The militia's control over Pljevlja was strong enough that the Yugoslav People's Army garrison in Pljevlja, composed of only 73 soldiers, refused to confront them. As a result, on 7 August 1992, Bulatović, Đukanović, Dobrica Ćosić and Života Panić came to Pljevlja to negotiate with all parties involved. During the negotiations, a representative of Pljevlja's Islamic community named Hakija Ajanović asked Bulatović to tighten border controls to prevent Serbian paramilitaries from Bosnia entering Montenegro. In contrast, Bulatović had been told by the police that "the border with Bosnia and Herzegovina was not possible to secure". In the end, Bulatović and his colleagues promised the Islamic community in Pljevlja that they would attempt to disarm the paramilitaries and add reinforcements of the Yugoslav People's Army to patrol the town. To satisfy the militia, Bulatović asked the local Muslims not to seek autonomy, although they had not done so over the course of the meeting.

"All of our efforts to assure the world how we're for peace fall into the water by the fact that self-proclaimed colonel Radović, who was once a JNA senior, who Šešelj promoted to a colonel, spoke in yesterday's airing by Studio Television of Montenegro, saying that he has his own forces, that he will kill all the Muslims...just by chance the journalist didn't put that. Simply, I think we're coming to the situation where we don't control the field, or the territory--that the self-proclaimed commanders and self-styled formations move and give statements which are catastrophic for our international position, yet we have absolutely no power whatsoever to take that space." -Bulatović on 7 August 1992.

In spite of Bulatović's reassurances, Pljevlja's Muslim community suffered various incidents, particularly in the village of Bukovica where six Muslim inhabitants were killed from 1992 to 1995. Additionally, the first kidnapping of Muslim inhabitants took place in Pljevlja on February 15, 1993, where Muslim family members were taken to a prison in Čajniče. After a negotiation leading to the release of Serbian reservists held as prisoners by the Army of Bosnia and Herzegovina, Bulatović announced the freeing of the Bungur family from the Čajniče prison in 1993, crediting Ćosić and Radovan Karadžić "personal responsibility" for the family's freedom.

In May 1993, Bulatović participated in the negotiations of the Vance-Owen Plan, held in Athens in the presence of Greek Prime Minister Konstantinos Mitsotakis. Bulatović along with Ćosić and Milošević collaborated in pressuring Karadžić to sign the plan. Karadžić eventually signed the plan, after which Bulatović traveled with Ćosić and Milošević to Pale, where they tried to convince wartime Republika Srpska's parliament to adopt the resolution signed in Athens. The parliament of Republika Srpska in Pale rejected the resolution in defiance of the Milošević-Ćosić-Bulatović team, and the war in Bosnia and Herzegovina continued for another two years.

=== Loss to Đukanović and departure from DPS ===
On 11 July 1997, the national committee ("Glavni odbor", abbreviated as "GO") of DPS, formerly the League of Communists, held a closed doors session after which the committee selected Milica Pejanović-Đurišić to replace Bulatović as the party president. The party split had enormous implications, making a political confrontation between Đukanović and Bulatović inevitable. This manifested in the 1997 Montenegrin presidential election held in October, which Đukanović won by a thin margin. Although the OSCE recognized the result as legitimate, Bulatović claimed that the United States interfered in Đukanović's favor. Bulatović then participated in the mobilization of a large demonstration at Đukanović's inauguration in Podgorica on 14 January 1998. The protest at Đukanović's inauguration was confronted by the police, resulting in the injury of 44 policemen and four civilians.

On 21 March 1998, Bulatović mobilized a large fraction from DPS CG and helped found the Socialist People's Party of Montenegro (SNP).

== Prime Minister of Yugoslavia (1998–2000) ==
On 21 May 1998, Bulatović was named the new prime minister of Yugoslavia by the country's parliament, replacing Đukanović loyalist Radoje Kontić. On 23 March 1999, he signed a declaration of a state of war when NATO began bombing Yugoslavia. He resigned on 9 October 2000, shortly after Milošević was ousted.

== Later life, death and legacy ==
Bulatović withdrew from frontline politics in 2001. His son Boško died at the age of 21 on 24 June 2008 after a short illness.

In 2017, Bulatović took part in protests by the pro-Serb opposition in Montenegro against the country's NATO membership. He was last seen in public at the funeral of Mirjana Marković in April 2019.

Bulatović died on 30 June 2019 at his family's home near Podgorica. A close associate, Milan Knežević, said the former president apparently suffered a heart attack. He was 62. Knežević, an opposition politician, said Bulatović "left a permanent trace in Montenegrin politics as a man who fought for his beliefs until the last day." Others, including some prosecutors at the ICTY, saw him as one of Milošević's partners in crime in the 1990s wars in Yugoslavia.

Political offices
New office	President of Montenegro; 1990–1998	Succeeded by Milo Đukanović
Preceded by Radoje Kontić	Prime Minister of Yugoslavia; 1998–2000	Succeeded by Zoran Žižić
Party political offices
Preceded by Milica Pejanović-Đurišić	President of the Presidency of League of Communists of Montenegro; 1989–1991	Succeeded by Position abolished
New political party	President of the Democratic Party of Socialists; 1991–1997	Succeeded by Milica Pejanović-Đurišić
New political party	Leader of the Socialist People's Party; 1998–2001	Succeeded by Predrag Bulatović
