= President of the Assembly of Yugoslavia =

President of the Federal Assembly of Yugoslavia
- Standard of the President
- Appointer: Assembly of Yugoslavia
- Formation: 26 October 1942; 84 years ago
- First holder: Ivan Ribar
- Final holder: Slobodan Gligorijević
- Abolished: 11 June 1992; 34 years ago

The President of the Assembly of the Socialist Federal Republic of Yugoslavia was the presiding officer of the Assembly of Yugoslavia, the legislative branch of the federal government.

== List ==
No.	Portrait	Name (Birth–Death)	Term of office			Political party	Representing
No.	Portrait	Name (Birth–Death)	Took office	Left office	Time in office	Political party	Representing
1		Ivan Ribar (1881–1968) (Note: Ribar was President of the Presidency of the National Assembly and as such was head of state in the 1945–1953 period.)	26 October 1942 (Note: Elected by the first session of the AVNOJ.)	5 March 1945	2 years, 130 days	KPJ	N/A
2		Lazar Sokolov (1914–1984)	5 March 1945	29 November 1945	269 days	KPJ	N/A
3		Vladimir Simić (1894–1974)	29 November 1945	25 December 1953	8 years, 26 days	KPJ; SKJ	N/A
4		Milovan Đilas (1911–1995)	25 December 1953	16 January 1954	22 days	SKJ	N/A
5		Moša Pijade (1890–1957)	29 January 1954	14 March 1957†	3 years, 44 days	SKJ	N/A
6		Petar Stambolić (1912–2007)	26 March 1957	29 June 1963	6 years, 95 days	SKJ	N/A
7		Edvard Kardelj (1910–1979)	29 June 1963	16 May 1967	3 years, 321 days	SKJ	N/A
8		Milentije Popović (1913–1971)	16 May 1967	8 May 1971†	3 years, 357 days	SKJ	N/A
9		Mijalko Todorović (1913–1999)	29 May 1971	15 May 1974	2 years, 351 days	SKJ	N/A
10		Kiro Gligorov (1917–2012)	15 May 1974	15 May 1978	4 years	SKJ	N/A
11		Dragoslav Marković (1920–2005)	15 May 1978	14 May 1982	3 years, 364 days	SKJ	N/A
12		Raif Dizdarević (1926–2026)	15 May 1982	13 May 1983	363 days	SKJ	Bosnia and Herzegovina
13		Vojo Srzentić (born 1934)	13 May 1983	15 May 1984	1 year, 2 days	SKJ	Montenegro
14		Dušan Alimpić (1921–2002)	15 May 1984	15 May 1985	1 year	SKJ	SAP Vojvodina
15		Ilaz Kurteshi (1927–2016)	15 May 1985	15 May 1986	1 year	SKJ	SAP Kosovo
16		Ivo Vrandečić (1927–2025)	15 May 1986	15 July 1987	1 year, 61 days	SKJ	Croatia
17		Marjan Rožič (1932–2017)	15 July 1987	15 May 1988	305 days	SKJ	Slovenia
18		Dušan Popovski (1930–1998)	15 May 1988	15 May 1989	1 year	SKJ	Macedonia
19		Slobodan Gligorijević (1920–1999)	15 May 1989	11 June 1992	3 years, 57 days	SKJ	Serbia

== See also ==
- Parliament of Yugoslavia
  - List of presidents of the Federal Chamber of the Federal Assembly of Yugoslavia
  - List of presidents of the Chamber of Republics and Provinces of the Federal Assembly of Yugoslavia
  - List of presidents of the Chamber of Nationalities of the Federal Assembly of Yugoslavia
  - List of presidents of the Economic Chamber of the Federal Assembly of Yugoslavia
  - List of presidents of the Chamber of Education and Culture of the Federal Assembly of Yugoslavia
  - List of presidents of the Chamber of Health and Social Welfare of the Federal Assembly of Yugoslavia
  - List of presidents of the Socio-Political Chamber of the Federal Assembly of Yugoslavia
- Parliament of Serbia and Montenegro
  - List of presidents of the Chamber of Citizens of the Federal Assembly of Yugoslavia
  - List of presidents of the Chamber of Republics of the Federal Assembly of Yugoslavia
  - List of presidents of the Assembly of Serbia and Montenegro
- List of presidents of the People's Assembly of Bosnia and Herzegovina
- Speaker of the Croatian Parliament
- President of the Parliament of Montenegro
- List of presidents of the Assembly of the Republic of North Macedonia
- President of the National Assembly of Serbia
- List of speakers of the National Assembly of Slovenia
- President of the Assembly of Vojvodina
- List of presidents of the Assembly of Kosovo
- Chairman of the Assembly of Kosovo

== Sources ==
- Yugoslav ministries, etc – Rulers.org
