= Constitution of the Federal Republic of Yugoslavia =

1992 constituency of the Federal Republic of Yugoslavia

The Constitution of the Federal Republic of Yugoslavia, also known as the Žabljak Constitution, was a constitution adopted by the Federal Council of the Assembly of the SFRY (Note: Acting in a truncated composition with representatives from Serbia and Montenegro) on 27 April 1992. It included the Republic of Serbia and the Republic of Montenegro. These two republics decided, after the dissolution of the SFRY, not to form independent states, but to form a common one. The Constitution declared the Federal Republic of Yugoslavia to be a democratic country, based on the equality of the peoples of both republics. The President of the FRY was elected by the Assembly, until the constitutional amendments of 2000 briefly made the President directly-elected. Members of the federal parliament were elected in direct elections, every four years. They elected the Government, whose mandate was also four years. The Constitution stipulated that the federal prime minister could not be from the same republic as the president. This Constitution, with later minor amendments, was in force until 2003, when the Constitutional Charter of the new country was adopted: the State Union of Serbia and Montenegro.
