= President of Serbia and Montenegro =

Head of state from 1992 to 2006

- Предс(ј)едник Србије и Црне Горе; Preds(j)ednik Srbije i Crne Gore
- Standard of the President
- Longest serving Zoran Lilić; 25 June 1993 – 25 June 1997
- Residence: White Palace
- Seat: Palace of the Federation
- Precursor: Presidency of Yugoslavia
- Formation: 15 June 1992; 34 years ago
- First holder: Dobrica Ćosić
- Final holder: Svetozar Marović
- Abolished: 3 June 2006; 20 years ago
- Superseded by: President of Serbia; President of Montenegro

The president of Serbia and Montenegro (Serbian: Предс(ј)едник Србије и Црне Горе, romanized: Preds(j)ednik Srbije i Crne Gore) was the head of state of Serbia and Montenegro. From its establishment in 1992 until 2003, when the country was reconstituted as a confederacy (state union) via constitutional reform, the head of state was known as the president of the Federal Republic of Yugoslavia (Serbian: Предс(ј)едник Савезне Републике Југославије, romanized: Preds(j)ednik Savezne Republike Jugoslavije). With the constitutional reforms of 2003 and the merging of the offices of head of government and head of state, the full title of the president was President of Serbia and Montenegro and Chairman of the Council of Ministers of Serbia and Montenegro (Serbian: Предс(ј)едник Србије и Црне Горе / Предс(ј)едник Сав(ј)ета министара Србије и Црне Горе). In 2006 the office was abolished as the state union was dissolved, with Serbia and Montenegro becoming independent countries.

== Authority ==
As head of state, the president had the power to

- represent the country at home and abroad
- appoint and recall heads of diplomatic and consular missions
- receive letters of credence and recall from foreign diplomatic representatives
- confer medals and other decorations
- promulgate laws passed by the Parliament
- call for parliamentary elections

In 2003, the powers of the president were extended to include the right to chair the Council of Ministers and propose the composition of the Council of Ministers to the parliament, effectively merging the powers of the head of government into the office. However, although the president became de jure both head of state and head of government, his role was largely limited because all the institutions were indirectly elected by confederal parliament, which was itself elected by parliaments of member states.

== Elections ==
Under the 1992 constitution, the president was elected by the Federal Assembly of Yugoslavia for a four-year term. After the constitutional amendments of 2000, direct elections for the office of President were introduced. Under the 2003 constitution, the president was once again elected by the Assembly of Serbia and Montenegro for a four-year term, this time at the proposal of the president and vice president of the assembly. The president of Serbia and Montenegro was a member of the Supreme Defence Council together with the president of Serbia and the president of Montenegro, and served automatically as chairman of the council of ministers. Previously, the president and the prime minister had to be from different republics; now, with the posts merged, the president of the assembly had to be from a different republic from the president of Serbia and Montenegro, who in turn could not come from the same republic for more than two consecutive terms of office.

The results of the direct presidential elections of 2000 were as follows:

Candidate	Party	28 September figures		10 October figures	
Candidate	Party	Votes	%	Votes	%
Vojislav Koštunica	Democratic Opposition of Serbia	2,474,392	50.38	2,470,304	51.71
Slobodan Milošević	SPS–JUL–SNP	1,951,761	39.74	1,826,799	38.24
Tomislav Nikolić	Serbian Radical Party	292,759	5.96	289,013	6.05
Vojislav Mihailović	Serbian Renewal Movement	146,585	2.98	145,019	3.04
Miodrag Vidojković	Affirmative Party	46,421	0.95	45,964	0.96
Total		4,911,918	100.00	4,777,099	100.00
Valid votes		4,911,918	97.32	4,777,099	97.19
Invalid/blank votes		135,371	2.68	137,991	2.81
Total votes		5,047,289	100.00	4,915,090	100.00
Registered voters/turnout		7,249,831	69.62	6,871,595	71.53
Source: CESID, IFES

== Presidents ==
There were five presidents of FR Yugoslavia (and two acting) after its assertion of independence from the Socialist Federal Republic of Yugoslavia (SFRY) in 1992 up until its dissolution in 2003. Svetozar Marović of the Democratic Party of Socialists of Montenegro was the only President of the FR Yugoslavia after its constitutional reforms and reconstitution as a confederacy. He was inaugurated on March 7, 2003. After the declaration of independence of Montenegro, on June 3, 2006, the president announced on June 4, 2006 the termination of his office.

Socialist Party of Serbia
Democratic Party of Serbia
Democratic Party of Socialists of Montenegro
Independent
Denotes an acting president

No.	Portrait	Name (Birth–Death)	Representing	Term of office			Party	Notes
No.	Portrait	Name (Birth–Death)	Representing	Took office	Left office	Time in office	Party	Notes
Presidents of the Federal Republic of Yugoslavia; 1992–2003
1		Dobrica Ćosić; Добрица Ћосић (1921–2014)	Serbia	15 June 1992	1 June 1993	351 days	Independent	
–		Miloš Radulović; Милош Радуловић (1929–2017)	Montenegro	1 June 1993	25 June 1993	24 days	Democratic Party of Socialists of Montenegro	Acting president.
2		Zoran Lilić; Зоран Лилић (born 1953)	Serbia	25 June 1993	25 June 1997	4 years	Socialist Party of Serbia	
–		Srđa Božović; Срђа Божовић (born 1955)	Montenegro	25 June 1997	23 July 1997	28 days	Democratic Party of Socialists of Montenegro	Acting president.
3		Slobodan Milošević; Слободан Милошевић (1941–2006)	Serbia	23 July 1997	7 October 2000	3 years, 76 days	Socialist Party of Serbia	Forced to step down in the Bulldozer Revolution.
4		Vojislav Koštunica; Војислав Коштуница (born 1944)	Serbia	7 October 2000	7 March 2003	2 years, 151 days	Democratic Party of Serbia	The only president elected in direct election.
President of the State Union of Serbia and Montenegro; 2003–2006
5		Svetozar Marović; Светозар Маровић (born 1955)	Montenegro	7 March 2003	3 June 2006	3 years, 88 days	Democratic Party of Socialists of Montenegro	Also head of government as Chairman of the Council of Ministers of Serbia and Montenegro (offices merged).

== See also ==
- Politics of Serbia and Montenegro
- Prime Minister of Serbia and Montenegro
- List of heads of state of Yugoslavia
- President of Montenegro
  - List of presidents of Montenegro
- President of Serbia
  - List of presidents of Serbia
