= Dragan Jovanović (Yugoslav politician) =

Yugoslav politician

Dragan Jovanović (Serbian Cyrillic: Драган Јовановић) was a cabinet minister in the Federal Republic of Yugoslavia during the early 1990s.

== Private career ==
Jovanović was director of the Serbian Social Accountancy Service in the Socialist Federal Republic of Yugoslavia at the time of that country's disintegration. In an interview with Tanjug in July 1991, he remarked that the constituent republics of Yugoslavia, and in particular Slovenia and Croatia, had stopped making mutual payments due to the deteriorating political situation. This, he added, was preventing Serbia from making its payments to those republics.

The Federal Republic of Yugoslavia reformed its currency in 1992, resulting in a chaotic period of hyperinflation. Jovanović was removed from his position in June 1992 after being blamed for a disastrous shift to the new dinar. He later accused allies of Serbian president Slobodan Milošević of scapegoating him for the situation.

== Cabinet minister ==
On September 11, 1992, Prime Minister of the Federal Republic of Yugoslavia Milan Panić appointed Jovanović as his minister of finance. This was considered as a pointed snub to Milošević and part of a bid by Panić to strengthen his position in an ongoing struggle against the Serbian president.

Jovanović's term in office was ultimately brief. Panić stood down as prime minister in February 1993, shortly after a failed bid to defeat Milošević in the 1992 Serbian general election. Jovanović left office not long thereafter, on March 2, 1993.
