= Miloš Radulović (politician) =

Montenegrin politician

- Милош Радуловић

President of the Federal Republic of Yugoslavia Acting
- In office 1 June 1993 – 25 June 1993
- Preceded by: Dobrica Ćosić
- Succeeded by: Zoran Lilić

Personal details
- Born: 22 February 1929 Danilovgrad, Kingdom of Serbs, Croats and Slovenes
- Died: 15 October 2017 (aged 88) Podgorica, Montenegro
- Party: Democratic Party of Socialists of Montenegro (DPS)

Miloš Radulović (Serbian Cyrillic: Милош Радуловић; 22 February 1929 – 15 October 2017) was a Montenegrin politician. He was the acting President of the Federal Republic of Yugoslavia in June 1993.

== Biography ==
He graduated at Ljubljana Faculty of Economics in 1958 and served as the Dean of Titograd Faculty of Economics from 1974 until 1979, as the rector of Titograd University from 1986 until 1992. Later, he served as a President of the Chamber of Republics of the Federal Assembly of Yugoslavia (1992–1997) and as ambassador to the United Kingdom (1997–1999).

Government offices
Preceded by Dobrica Ćosić	President of FR Yugoslavia; 1993 (Acting)	Succeeded by Zoran Lilić
