= Jovičić =

Jovičić or Jovicic (Serbian: Јовичић) is a Serbian surname derived from a masculine given name Jovica. Notable people with the surname include:

- Matija Jovičić (1755–1820), Serbian revolutionary
- Branko Jovičić (born 1993), Serbian footballer
- Đorđe Jovičić
- Igor Jovičić (born 1964), first and last Secretary General of Serbia and Montenegro
- Robert Jovicic (born 1966)
- Zoran Jovičić (born 1956), president of the World Diasporas and Minorities Organization (WDMO)
- Zoran Jovičić (footballer) (born 1973), Serbian footballer
