= Jovica =

Jovica (Serbian Cyrillic: Јовица) is a masculine given name. It is a hypocoristic form of the name Jovan.

Notable people with the given name include:

- Jovica Antonić (born 1966), Serbian professional basketball coach, former player
- Jovica Arsić (born 1968), Serbian basketball coach
- Jovica Blagojević (born 1998), Serbian footballer
- Jovica Cvetković (born 1959), Serbian handball coach and former Olympic player
- Jovica Damjanović (born 1975), retired Serbian football midfielder
- Jovica Elezović (born 1956), former Yugoslav handball player
- Jovica Jevtić (born 1975), politician in Serbia
- Jovica Kolb (born 1963), Serbian former football player
- Jovica Lakić (born 1974), retired Serbian professional footballer
- Jovica Milijić (born 1986), Serbian-born Maltese futsal player
- Jovica Nikolić (born 1959), Serbian former midfielder
- Jovica Raduka or Joe Raduka (born 1954), former Serbian-American soccer player
- Jovica Simanic or Jovo Simanić (born 1965), Serbian retired footballer
- Jovica Škoro (born 1947), Serbian football manager and former player
- Jovica Stanišić (born 1950), former head of the Serbian State Security Service
- Jovica Stokić (born 1987), Bosnian professional footballer
- Jovica Tasevski-Eternijan (born 1976), Macedonian poet, essayist and literary critic
- Jovica Trajcev (born 1981), Macedonian football player
- Jovica Vasilić (born 1990), Serbian footballer
- Jovica Veljović (born 1954), Serbian type designer and calligrapher
- Jovica Vico (born 1978), former Bosnian professional footballer

Notable people with the eponymous surname include:

- Victor Jovica (born 1945), Croatian-born Puerto Rican professional wrestler and promoter

== See also ==
- Jović
- Jovičić
- Ivica
