= Ministry of Finance (Serbia and Montenegro) =

Former government ministry responsible for financial system

- Serbo-Croatian: Ministarstvo finansija/Министарство финансија

Ministry overview
- Formed: 14 July 1992; 34 years ago
- Dissolved: 17 March 2003; 23 years ago
- Jurisdiction: Serbia and Montenegro
- Headquarters: Belgrade
- Ministers responsible: Oskar Kovač, first Minister of Finance; Jovan Ranković, last Minister of Finance
- Parent department: Federal Government of the FR Yugoslavia

The Ministry of Finance was the finance ministry of Serbia and Montenegro, officially named the Federal Republic of Yugoslavia from 1992 to 2003.

== List of ministers ==
Following the breakup of Yugoslavia and the secession of four out of six constituent republic in the SFR Yugoslavia the remaining two (Serbia and Montenegro) established a federation in 1992 called the Federal Republic of Yugoslavia (FR Yugoslavia). This lasted until 2003 when it was reconstituted as a state union called Serbia and Montenegro. In 2006 both countries declared independence and parted ways.

No.	Portrait	Minister for Finance	Took office	Left office	Time in office	Party
1	Oskar Kovač [sr]	Oskar Kovač (1937–2021)	14 July 1992	11 September 1992	59 days	SPS
2	Dragan Jovanović	Dragan Jovanović	11 September 1992	2 March 1993	172 days	Independent
–	Jovan Zebić [sr]	Jovan Zebić (1939–2007); Acting	2 March 1993	6 July 1993	126 days	SPS
3	Vuk Ognjanović	Vuk Ognjanović (born 1939)	6 July 1993	15 September 1994	1 year, 71 days	DPS
4	Jovan Zebić [sr]	Jovan Zebić (1939–2007)	15 September 1994	12 June 1996	1 year, 271 days	SPS
5	Tomica Raičević	Tomica Raičević (born 1943)	12 June 1996	20 March 1997	281 days	SPS
6	Božidar Gazivoda	Božidar Gazivoda (born 1940)	20 March 1997	20 May 1998	1 year, 61 days	DPS
7	Dragiša Pešić	Dragiša Pešić (1954–2016)	20 May 1998	24 July 2001	3 years, 65 days	SNP
8	Jovan Ranković	Jovan Ranković (born 1930)	24 July 2001	7 February 2002	198 days	DSS
–	Veroljub Dugalić	Veroljub Dugalić (born 1955); Acting	7 February 2002	17 March 2003	1 year, 38 days	G17+

== See also ==
- National Bank of Yugoslavia in Serbia and Montenegro
- Ministry of Finance (Yugoslavia)
- Ministry of Finance (Montenegro)
- Ministry of Finance (Serbia)
