= Skupština =

Skupština (Скупштина) is a Serbo-Croatian word for assembly, referring to Parliament. As such, it is used in the name of the following assemblies:

- Narodna skupština Srbije, National Assembly of Serbia
- Skupština Crne Gore, National Assembly of Montenegro
- Parlamentarna skupština Bosne i Hercegovine, Parliamentary Assembly of Bosnia and Herzegovina
- Narodna skupština Republike Srpske, National Assembly of Republika Srpska
- Skupština Republike Kosovo, Assembly of the Republic of Kosovo
- (former) Narodna skupština Srbije i Crne Gore, National Assembly of Serbia and Montenegro
- (former) Narodna skupština Kraljevine Jugoslavije, National Assembly of the Kingdom of Yugoslavia
- (former) Narodna skupština Kraljevine Crne Gore, National Assembly of the Kingdom of Montenegro,
