= Dragiša Pešić =

Montenegrin politician (1954–2016)

- Драгиша Пешић
- Pešić in 2001

5th Prime Minister of the Federal Republic of Yugoslavia
- In office 24 July 2001 – 7 March 2003
- President: Vojislav Koštunica
- Preceded by: Zoran Žižić
- Succeeded by: Svetozar Marović (as head of government of Serbia & Montenegro)

7th Finance Minister of the Federal Republic of Yugoslavia
- In office 20 May 1998 – 24 July 2001
- Prime Minister: Momir Bulatović; Zoran Žižić
- Preceded by: Božidar Gazivoda
- Succeeded by: Jovan Ranković

Personal details
- Born: 8 August 1954 Danilovgrad, PR Montenegro, FPR Yugoslavia
- Died: 8 September 2016 (aged 62) Podgorica, Montenegro
- Party: Democratic Party of Socialists; Socialist People's Party
- Spouse: Lela
- Children: Marko and Marija

Dragiša Pešić (Serbian Cyrillic: Драгиша Пешић; 8 August 1954 – 8 September 2016) was a Montenegrin politician. He was the penultimate Prime Minister of the Federal Republic of Yugoslavia.

== Biography ==
Pešić was born in Danilovgrad on 8 August 1954. He studied economics at the University of Sarajevo's Faculty of Economics, where he graduated in 1978.

He was President of the executive committee of Podgorica Municipality, a member of the Chamber of Citizens in the Federal Assembly of the Federal Republic of Yugoslavia. In 1998, he became Finance Minister of FR Yugoslavia, in the governments of Prime Ministers Momir Bulatović and Zoran Žižić.

Dragiša Pešić became Prime Minister of FR Yugoslavia on 24 July 2001, after Žižić resigned in protest of the extradition of Slobodan Milošević to the ICTY.

Pešić became a member of the Senate of the State Audit Institution (DRI) of Montenegro in December 2007.

He died on 8 September 2016 at the age of 62. He was buried on 10 September in the village of Frutak near Danilovgrad.

Preceded by Zoran Žižić	Prime Minister of the Federal Republic of Yugoslavia; 2001–2003	Succeeded by Svetozar Marović (as Chairman of the Council of Ministers of Serbia and Montenegro)
