= Zoran Aranđelović =

Serbian politician and economist (born 1948)

- Зоран Аранђеловић

President of the National Assembly of Serbia
- In office 29 June 1993 – 24 January 1994
- Preceded by: Zoran Lilić
- Succeeded by: Dragan Tomić

Deputy Prime Minister of Serbia
- In office 23 December 1991 – 29 June 1993
- Prime Minister: Radoman Božović; Nikola Šainović
- Preceded by: Budimir Košutić
- Succeeded by: Saša Anđelković

Personal details
- Born: 10 October 1948 (age 77) SFR Yugoslavia
- Party: SPS
- Education: University of Niš
- Occupation: Politician, economist

Zoran Aranđelović (Serbian: Зоран Аранђеловић; born 10 October 1948) is a Serbian politician and economist. A member of the Socialist Party of Serbia, he served as deputy prime minister of Serbia from 1991 to 1993, president of the National Assembly of Serbia from 1993 to 1994, and as member of the National Assembly of Yugoslavia. From 1994 to 2000, he was the general manager of the tobacco firm Duvanska industrija Niš (DIN) in Niš. He holds a PhD in economics and is a professor of National Economy and Economic Policy at the Faculty of Economics in Niš.

Political offices
Preceded by Zoran Lilić	President of the National Assembly of Serbia; 1993–1994	Succeeded by Dragan Tomić
Preceded by Budimir Košutić	Deputy Prime Minister of Serbia; 1991–1993	Succeeded by Saša Anđelković
