= Đuro Kladarin =

Croatian general

Đuro Kladarin (3 March 1915 - 1996) was a Croatian general. He served as President of the Chamber of Education and Culture of the Federal Assembly of Yugoslavia.

== Biography ==
Kladarin was born in Luščani, Austria-Hungary on 3 March 1915.

In 1941, Kladarin entered the National Liberation Army and Partisan Detachments of Yugoslavia. During the Second World War, he was a battalion commander and also the commander of the Yugoslavia Banijskega Troop.

In 1950, after World War Two, he graduated at the Higher Military Academy Army and then held high-ranking positions such as Brigade Commander and Division Chief of Staff. Đuro Kladarin officially retired from his political career circa 1965.
