= Yugoslav Revolution =

Yugoslav Revolution may refer to:

- Revolution in the Federal Republic of Yugoslavia, also known as the Bulldozer Revolution or the 5 October Revolution, a series of protests leading to the overthrow of Slobodan Milošević in 2000
- National Liberation War and Socialist Revolution in Yugoslavia during World War II, that overthrew the Axis occupation in the 1940s and established the Socialist Federal Republic of Yugoslavia
