= Prime Minister of Serbia and Montenegro =

Head of government from 1992 to 2006

- Preds(ј)ednik Saveta ministara Srbije i Crne Gore; Предс(ј)едник Савета министара Србије и Црне Горе
- Standard of the Prime Minister

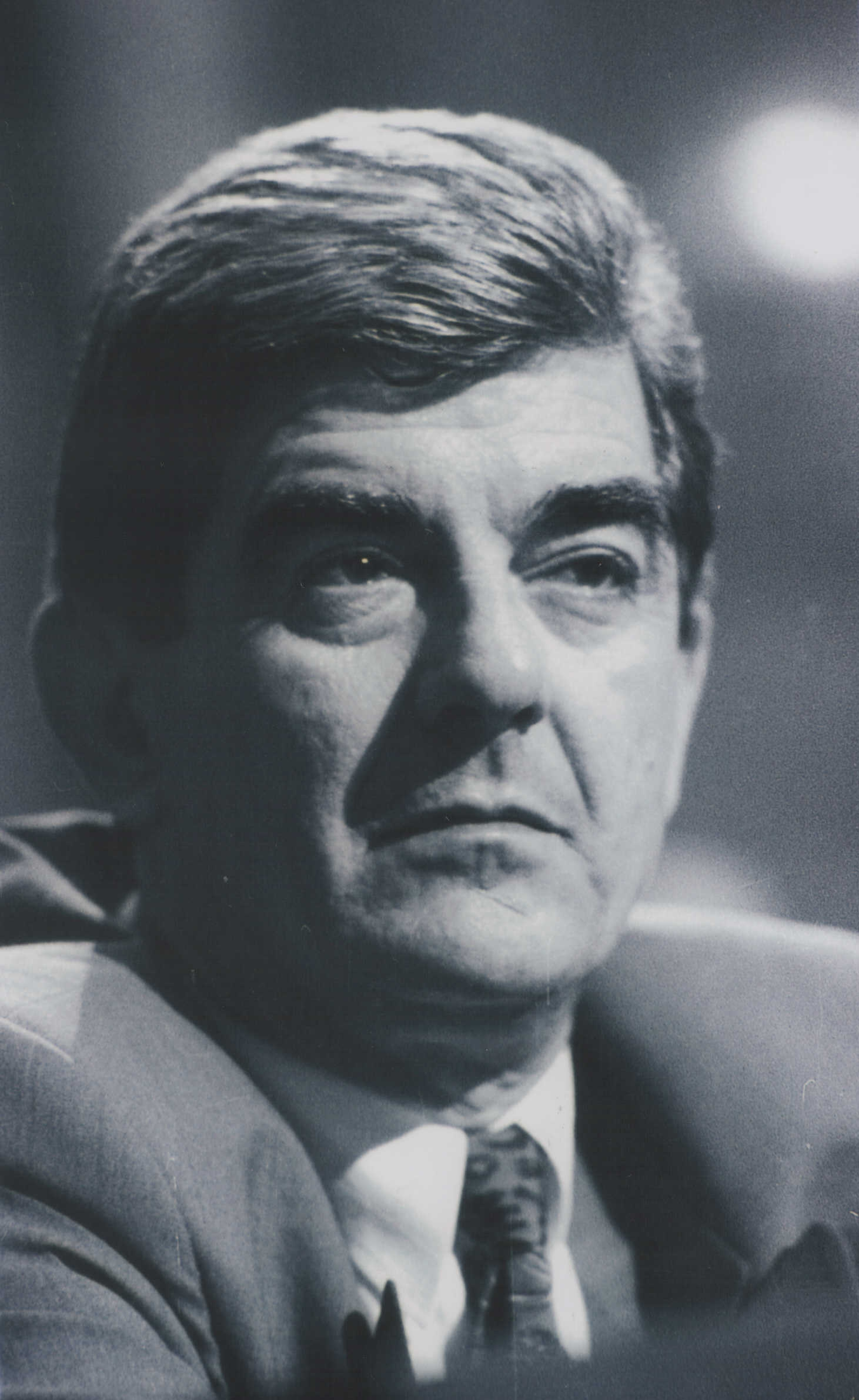
- Longest serving Radoje Kontić; 9 February 1993 – 19 May 1998
- Member of: Federal Government
- Reports to: President of Serbia and Montenegro
- Seat: Palace of the Federation
- Precursor: President of the Federal Executive Council of Yugoslavia
- Formation: 14 July 1992; 34 years ago
- First holder: Milan Panić
- Final holder: Svetozar Marović
- Abolished: 3 June 2006; 20 years ago
- Succession: Prime Minister of Serbia; Prime Minister of Montenegro

The prime minister of Serbia and Montenegro was the head of government of Serbia and Montenegro from its establishment in 1992 up until the state's dissolution in 2006. Between 1992–2003 the full name of the office was President of the Federal Government of the Federal Republic of Yugoslavia (Serbian: Preds(ј)ednik Savezne Vlade Savezne Republike Jugoslavije), while after the constitutional reforms of 2003 the title was Chairman of the Council of Ministers of Serbia and Montenegro (Serbian: Preds(ј)ednik Saveta ministara Srbije i Crne Gore, literally translated as President of the Council of Ministers of Serbia and Montenegro). The office was merged in 2003 with the head of state, providing for one person to hold both the office of President of Serbia and Montenegro and Chairman of the Council of Ministers of Serbia and Montenegro.

== Prime ministers ==
There were five presidents of the Federal Government of the FR Yugoslavia after its assertion of independence from the SFR Yugoslavia (SFRY) in 1992 up until its dissolution in 2003. Svetozar Marović of the Democratic Party of Socialists of Montenegro was the only chairman of the Council of Ministers of Serbia and Montenegro after its constitutional reforms and reconstitution as a confederacy. He was inaugurated on March 7, 2003. After the declaration of independence of Montenegro, on June 3, 2006, the chairman of the Council of Ministers announced on June 4, 2006 the termination of his office.

Democratic Party of Socialists of Montenegro
Socialist People's Party of Montenegro
Independent

No.	Portrait	Name (Birth–Death)	Nationality	Term of office			Party	Notes
No.	Portrait	Name (Birth–Death)	Nationality	Took office	Left office	Time in office	Party	Notes
Presidents of the Federal Government; 1992–2003
1		Milan Panić; Милан Панић (1929–2026)	Serbian	14 July 1992	9 February 1993	210 days	Independent	
2		Radoje Kontić; Радоје Контић (born 1937)	Montenegrin	9 February 1993	19 May 1998	5 years, 99 days	Democratic Party of Socialists of Montenegro	
3		Momir Bulatović; Момир Булатовић (1956–2019)	Montenegrin	19 May 1998	4 November 2000	2 years, 169 days	Socialist People's Party of Montenegro	Resigned on 9 October 2000, after the Bulldozer Revolution.
4		Zoran Žižić; Зоран Жижић (1951–2013)	Montenegrin	4 November 2000	24 July 2001	262 days	Socialist People's Party of Montenegro	Resigned on 29 June 2001, in protest over the extradition of Slobodan Milošević to the ICTY.
5		Dragiša Pešić; Драгиша Пешић (1954–2016)	Montenegrin	24 July 2001	7 March 2003	1 year, 226 days	Socialist People's Party of Montenegro	
Chairman of the Council of Ministers; 2003–2006
6		Svetozar Marović; Светозар Маровић (born 1955)	Montenegrin	7 March 2003	3 June 2006	3 years, 88 days	Democratic Party of Socialists of Montenegro	Also head of state as President of Serbia and Montenegro (offices merged).

== See also ==
- Deputy Prime Minister of Serbia and Montenegro
- Politics of Serbia and Montenegro
- President of Serbia and Montenegro
- Prime Minister of Yugoslavia
- Prime Minister of Montenegro
- Prime Minister of Serbia
