= Politics of Serbia and Montenegro =

The Politics of Serbia and Montenegro, known as the Federal Republic of Yugoslavia, later renamed as Serbia and Montenegro, took place in a framework of a federal parliamentary republic with a multi-party system, and after 2003, in the context of a confederation. The president was head of state and, following constitutional reforms in 2003, simultaneously head of government. Executive power was exercised by the Council of Ministers. Federal legislative power was vested in the Serbia-Montenegro Parliament.

== History ==
In January 1998, Milo Đukanović became president of Montenegro, following the bitterly contested presidential election in November 1997, which were pronounced free and fair by international monitors. His coalition followed up with the parliamentary election in May. Having weathered Milošević's campaign to undermine his government, Đukanović struggled to balance the pro-independence stance of his coalition with the changed domestic and international environment of the post-October 5 country. In December 2002, Đukanović resigned as president and was appointed Prime Minister. The new President of Montenegro became Filip Vujanović.

Before the October 5 overthrow as opposition grew, Milošević continued to hold significant power. Although his political party, the Socialist Party of Serbia (SPS) (in electoral cartel with Mirjana Markovic' Yugoslav Left), did not enjoy a majority in either the federal or Serbian parliaments, it dominated the governing coalitions and held all the key administrative posts. An essential element of Milošević's grasp on power was his control of the police. Routine federal elections in September 2000 resulted in Vojislav Koštunica, leader of the Democratic Opposition of Serbia block - receiving less than a majority, requiring a second round. Immediately, street protests and rallies filled cities across the country as the nation rallied around Vojislav Koštunica, the recently formed candidate for FRY president. There had been widespread fear that the second round would be canceled on the basis of foreign interference in the elections.

On 5 October 2000, Slobodan Milošević was forced to concede defeat after days of mass protests across Serbia. New FRY President Vojislav Koštunica was supported by Zoran Đinđić, who was elected Prime Minister of Serbia in the December 2000 republican elections. After an initial honeymoon period in the wake of October 5, DSS and the rest of DOS, led by Đinđić and his DS, found themselves increasingly at odds over the nature and pace of the governments' reform programs. By mid-2002, Koštunica and Đinđić were openly at odds over the direction of the country's future. Koštunica's party, having informally withdrawn from all DOS decision-making bodies, was agitating for early elections in an effort to force Đinđić from the scene. After the initial euphoria of replacing Milošević, the population in reaction to this political maneuvering, was sliding into apathy and disillusionment with its leading politicians. This political stalemate continued for much of 2002, and reform initiatives stalled. Finally in February 2003, the Constitutional Charter was ratified by both republics, and Yugoslavia became a confederacy. Under the new Constitutional Charter, most federal functions and authorities devolved to the republic level. Svetozar Marović was elected as the new president of Yugoslavia.

On 6 February 2003, the country became a confederation pursuant to amendments agreed the previous year. This was to be a confederacy with more powers devolved to the constituent republics, Montenegro and Serbia, operating as a commonwealth. The central government largely became a ceremonial outfit.

On 12 March 2003, Serbia′s prime minister Zoran Đinđić was assassinated. The newly formed confederate government of Yugoslavia reacted swiftly by calling a state of emergency and undertaking an unprecedented crackdown on organized crime which led to the arrest of more than 4,000 people.

On 3 June 2006, Montenegro declared independence. On 5 June 2006, Serbia also declared independence, thus ending the 88 year old unity of the two Serbian countries - Serbia and Montenegro.

== Executive branch ==
The president was elected by the Parliament for a four-year term. He chaired the Council of Ministers, composed of five members.

Main office-holders
Office	Name	Party	Since
President	Svetozar Marović	DPS	7 March 2003 - 3 June 2006

== Legislative branch ==
The Assembly of Serbia and Montenegro (Skupština Srbije i Crne Gore) had 126 members elected for a four-year term, 91 in Serbia and 35 in Montenegro. The first parliament was elected 25 February 2003 by the members of the old federal and the republican parliaments. Mandates were divided among parties and coalitions in proportion to the number of their benches in Serbia's and Montenegro's parliaments. Every time one of the parliaments was re-elected, the composition changes.

== Judicial branch ==
FR Yugoslavia had a Federal Court and a Constitutional Court. Judges were elected by the Federal Assembly for nine-year terms. After the promulgation of the new Constitution, the Federal Court would've had constitutional and administrative functions; it would've had an equal number of judges from each republic.

== Federalism ==
FR Yugoslavia operated under cooperative federalism, where federal and regional governments collaborate with each other by overlapping certain responsibilities.

== International organizations membership ==
ABEDA, BIS, CE (guest), CEI, EBRD, FAO, G-77, IAEA, IBRD, ICAO, ICC, ICCt, ICFTU, ICRM, IDA, IFAD, IFC, IFRCS, IHO, ILO, IMF, IMO, Interpol, IOC, IOM, ISO, ITU, NAM (guest), OAS (observer), OPCW, OSCE, PCA, UN, UNCTAD, UNESCO, UNHCR, UNIDO, UNMISET, UPU, WCL, WCO, WHO, WIPO, WMO, UNWTO, WTO (observer).

== See also ==
- Politics of Serbia
- Politics of Montenegro
