= Igor Jovičić =

Serbian politician (born 1964)

Igor Jovičić (born 16 February 1964) was the first and only Secretary General of the Council of Ministers of the short-lived (2003–2006) country of Serbia and Montenegro. He became Secretary of the Serbian Ministry of Culture and Information in September 2013.

From June 2007 to July 2012 he was the Secretary of State in the Serbian Ministry of Defence. He served as Chairman of the Military Academy Board, Chairman of the MOD Personnel Committee, member of the Commission for decorations of the President of the Serbia, member of the Council of Relations with Serbs in the Region, member of the Serbian National Council for Co-operation with the ICTY, member of the Defense Planning Committee as well as the Scientific Research Committee, acted as the Republic Serbia representative at various international conferences and meetings in the relevant field of responsibility.

Born in Zagreb, he graduated from the Faculty of Law of the University of Zagreb, Master of Laws. He passed his bar examination in Belgrade. From 1997 he served as Federal Administrative Inspector at the Federal Ministry of Justice and from 2000 as Deputy Secretary General of the Federal Government.

He is married and a father of two children.

== Sources ==
- Ministarstvo kulture i informisanja
