= Council of Ministers of Serbia and Montenegro =

The Council of Ministers of Serbia and Montenegro (Serbian: Савет Министара Србије и Црне Горе, Savet Ministara Srbije i Crne Gore) was the federal executive governing body of Serbia and Montenegro. First created under the 1992 Yugoslav Constitution as the Federal Government of the Federal Republic of Yugoslavia, it was reorganized in 2003 under the Constitutional Charter of Serbia and Montenegro when the federation became a confederacy.

== Organization ==
Chairman of the council: Svetozar Marović

Secretary general: Igor Jovičić

The council was composed of 5 ministries. Ministers at the moment of dissolution were:

- Minister of Foreign Affairs: Vuk Drašković (Preceded by: Goran Svilanović)
- Minister of Defence: Zoran Stanković (Preceded by: Prvoslav Davinić (11 July 2004 – 21 October 2005), Boris Tadić (17 March 2003 – 11 July 2004))
- Minister of International Economic Relations: Predrag Ivanović
- Minister of Internal Economic Relations: Amir Nurković
- Minister of Human and Minority Rights: Rasim Ljajić

== Responsibilities ==
The Council of Ministers duties were to:

- Chart and pursue the policy of Serbia and Montenegro in tune with the jointly agreed policy and interests of the member states.
- Coordinate the work of the ministries, propose to the parliament the laws and other acts falling within the purview of the ministries.
- Appoint and relieve of duty the heads of diplomatic-consular missions of Serbia and Montenegro and other officials in line with the law.
- Pass by-laws, decisions and other general enactments for enforcement of the laws of Serbia and Montenegro and to perform other executive duties in accordance with the present constitutional charter.

== Terms ==
- Ministers of foreign affairs and defense served two-year terms.
- Ministers of International Economic Relations, Internal Economic Relations and Human and Minority Rights served four-year terms.

== See also ==
- Politics of Serbia and Montenegro
