= List of presidents of the Chamber of Citizens of the Federal Assembly of Yugoslavia =

This article lists the presidents of the Chamber of Citizens of the Federal Assembly of Yugoslavia.

== List ==
Name (Birth–Death)	Term of office		Party
Jugoslav Kostić (1939–2025)	11 June 1992	3 February 1993	Socialist Party of Serbia
Radoman Božović (born 1953)	3 February 1993	10 December 1996	Socialist Party of Serbia
Milomir Minić (born 1950)	10 December 1996	7 October 2000	Socialist Party of Serbia
Milorad Marković (1926–2013)^{[a]}	24 October 2000	3 November 2000	Socialist People's Party
Dragoljub Mićunović (1930–2026)	3 November 2000	3 March 2003	Democratic Centre

^{a} Acting President of the Chamber of Citizens

== See also ==
- Assembly of Serbia and Montenegro (Parliament of Federal Republic of Yugoslavia)
  - List of presidents of the Chamber of Republics of the Federal Assembly of Yugoslavia

== Sources ==
- Yugoslav ministries, etc – Rulers.org
