= Jovica Jevtić =

Serbian politician (born 1975)

Jovica Jevtić (Serbian Cyrillic: Јовица Јевтић; born 1975) is a politician in Serbia. He served in the National Assembly of Serbia from 2014 to 2020 as a member of the Serbian Progressive Party.

== Private career ==
Jevtić is an electrical engineer and works as a plant manager in Kraljevo. Based in neighbouring Raška, he was appointed as acting director of that community's institute for urban planning and construction in 2012.

== Political career ==
Jevtić received the 121st position on the Progressive Party's Aleksandar Vučić — Future We Believe In electoral list in the 2014 parliamentary election and was declared elected when the list won a landslide victory with 158 out of 250 mandates. He again received the 121st position in the 2016 election for the renamed Aleksandar Vučić – Serbia Is Winning list and was re-elected when the list won a second consecutive landslide victory with 131 mandates. Jevtić serves on the parliamentary committee on spatial planning, transport, infrastructure, and telecommunications; is a deputy member of the committee on education, science, technological development, and the information society; and is a member of the parliamentary friendship group with Bosnia and Herzegovina.
