= Zoran Lilić =

Serbian politician

- Зоран Лилић

2nd President of the Federal Republic of Yugoslavia
- In office 25 June 1993 – 25 June 1997
- Prime Minister: Radoje Kontić
- Preceded by: Dobrica Ćosić
- Succeeded by: Slobodan Milošević

3rd President of the National Assembly of Serbia
- In office 25 January 1993 – 29 June 1993
- Preceded by: Aleksandar Bakočević
- Succeeded by: Zoran Aranđelović

Personal details
- Born: 27 August 1953 (age 72) Brza Palanka, PR Serbia, FPR Yugoslavia
- Party: Socialist Party of Serbia (1990–2000)
- Spouse: Ljubica Brković Lilić (m. 1980)
- Parents: Sokol Lilić (father); Dobrila Lilić (mother)

Zoran Lilić (Serbian Cyrillic: Зоран Лилић; born 27 August 1953) is a Serbian and former Yugoslav politician. He served as President of the National Assembly of Serbia in 1993, and as President of the Federal Republic of Yugoslavia from 1993 to 1997.

== Biography ==
He finished primary and secondary school in his native village. He graduated from the University of Belgrade Faculty of Technology and worked in the rubber factory "Rekord" in Rakovica. After twelve years of performing various duties, he was appointed director general.

He was an MP of the Socialist Party of Serbia (SPS) in the National Assembly of Serbia, and then he became the Speaker of the National Assembly. He was named president of the Federal Republic of Yugoslavia after Dobrica Ćosić was forced to resign. He remained at the forefront of Third Yugoslavia until 1997.

In 1997, Milošević was termed out of the Serbian presidency, and was elected to the federal presidency. Lilić became the SPS candidate to succeed Milošević as president of Serbia. After the unsuccessful second round with Vojislav Šešelj he became vice president of the Federal Government in the cabinet of Momir Bulatović, and he remained on this duty until April 1999 when he was appointed advisor to the President of the Federal Republic of Yugoslavia Slobodan Milošević for economic relations with Croatia. At that time he performed the functions of chairman of Jugotransport and the president of Chess Association of Yugoslavia. He left SPS in 2000 founded the Serbian Social Democratic Party.

Lilić involved himself in attempting to sort out the HIV trial in Libya, where four Bulgarian nurses and one Palestinian doctor were sentenced to death for allegedly infecting Libyan babies with the HIV virus. Lilić reportedly falsely posed as an envoy or messenger of the Bulgarian president, Georgi Parvanov.

Political offices
Preceded by Dobrica Ćosić	President of the Federal Republic of Yugoslavia; 1993–1997	Succeeded by Slobodan Milošević
