= List of presidents of the Chamber of Republics of the Federal Assembly of Yugoslavia =

This article lists the presidents of the Chamber of Republics of the Federal Assembly of Yugoslavia.

== List ==
Name (Birth–Death)	Term of office		Party
Miloš Radulović (1929–2017)	1992	1996	Democratic Party of Socialists
Radmilo Bogdanović (1934–2014)^{[a]}	1996		Socialist Party of Serbia
Srđa Božović (born 1955)	1996	2003	Democratic Party of Socialists
Srđa Božović (born 1955)	1996	2003	Socialist People's Party

^{a} Acting President of the Chamber of Republics

== See also ==
- Assembly of Serbia and Montenegro (Parliament of Federal Republic of Yugoslavia)
  - List of presidents of the Chamber of Citizens of the Federal Assembly of Yugoslavia

== Sources ==
- Yugoslav ministries, etc – Rulers.org
