= List of presidents of the Chamber of Education and Culture of the Federal Assembly of Yugoslavia =

The President of the Chamber of Education and Culture was the presiding officer of the Chamber of Education and Culture of the Federal Assembly of Yugoslavia.

== Office-holders ==
- Nikola Sekulić
- Đuro Kladarin
- Avguštin Lah (1969 – 1974)

== Sources ==
- Various editions of The Europa World Year Book
