= President of the Chamber of Republics and Provinces of the Assembly of Yugoslavia =

The President of the Chamber of Republic and Provinces was the presiding officer of the upper house of the Assembly of the Socialist Federal Republic of Yugoslavia.

Below is an incomplete list of office-holders from 1974:

Name	Period	Republic/Province
Zoran Polič	1974–1982	Slovenia
Nikola Kmezić	1982–1983	Vojvodina
Anton Bubić	1983–1984	Croatia
Milivoje Stijović	1984–1985	Montenegro
Metodi Antov	1985–1986	Macedonia
Milenko Bojanić	1986–1987	Serbia
Draško Popović	1987–1988	Bosnia and Herzegovina
Abaz Kazazi	1988–1989	Kosovo
Miran Mejak	1989–1991	Slovenia

== Sources ==
- Various editions of The Europa World Year Book
