= List of presidents of the Chamber of Health and Social Welfare of the Federal Assembly of Yugoslavia =

The President of the Chamber of Health and Social Welfare was the presiding officer of the Chamber of Health and Social Welfare of the Federal Assembly of Yugoslavia.

== Office-holders ==
- Olga Vrabić June 29, 1963 - May 16, 1967
- Iko Mirković May 16, 1967 - May 15, 1969
- Ljubiša Popović May 15, 1969 - May 16, 1974

== Sources ==
- Various editions of The Europa World Year Book
