= List of presidents of the Socio-Political Chamber of the Federal Assembly of Yugoslavia =

The president of the Socio-Political Chamber was the presiding officer of the Socio-Political Chamber of the Federal Assembly of Yugoslavia.

== Office-holders ==
- Krsto Popivoda 1963 – 1967
- Velimir Stojnić 1967 – ?
- Radomir Komatina ? – 1974 ?

== Sources ==
- Various editions of The Europa World Year Book
