= Svetozar Marović =

Montenegrin lawyer and politician (born 1955)

- Светозар Маровић
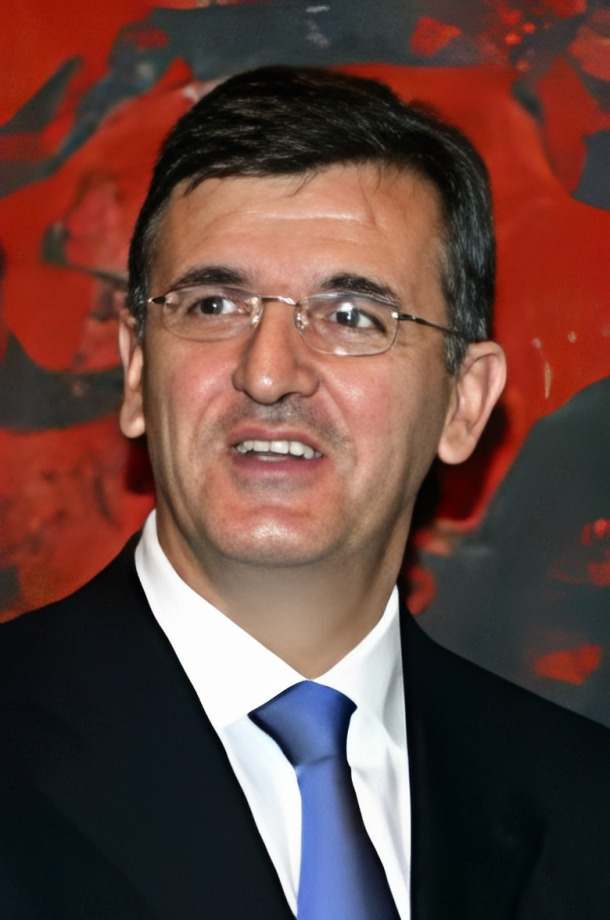
- Marović in 2004

President of Serbia and Montenegro
- In office 7 March 2003 – 3 June 2006
- Preceded by: Vojislav Koštunica (as President of the Federal Republic of Yugoslavia)
- Succeeded by: Position abolished; Boris Tadić (as President of Serbia); Filip Vujanović (as President of Montenegro)

Deputy Prime Minister of Montenegro
- In office 11 June 2009 – 29 December 2010
- Prime Minister: Milo Đukanović
- Succeeded by: Duško Marković

Chairman of the Council of Ministers
- In office 7 March 2003 – 3 June 2006
- Preceded by: Dragiša Pešić
- Succeeded by: Position abolished

President of the Parliament of Montenegro
- In office 12 December 1994 – 7 June 2001
- Prime Minister: Milo Đukanović; Filip Vujanović
- Preceded by: Risto Vukčević
- Succeeded by: Vesna Perović

Personal details
- Born: 31 March 1955 (age 71) Kotor, PR Montenegro, FPR Yugoslavia
- Party: DPS (1991–2016); SKCG (until 1991)
- Spouse(s): Đorđina "Đina" Marović (née Prelević)
- Children: 2 (including Miloš Marović)
- Education: Veljko Vlahović University
- Profession: Lawyer, politician

Svetozar Marović (Montenegrin Cyrillic: Светозар Маровић; born 31 March 1955) is a Montenegrin lawyer and politician who served as the last head of state and head of government of Serbia and Montenegro from 2003 until Montenegro's declaration of independence in 2006.

On 15 December 2015, he was arrested in Montenegro for charges of corruption, and on 18 August 2017, his family's assets were frozen. He currently resides in Serbia, where he fled, just before he was found guilty in 2017. Montenegro has repeatedly requested his extradition from Serbia.

In April 2022, Marović was added to the US Treasury's Specially Designated Nationals List of individuals facing Balkans-related sanctions.

== Early life ==
Svetozar Marović was born on 31 March 1955 in Kotor to Jovo Marović and Ivana Marović (née Pavić). His father was a native of the Grbalj region. Marović finished elementary and high school in his hometown, going on to receive his degree from Veljko Vlahović University's Faculty of Law in Titograd (now Podgorica).

== Early political career ==
Marović began his career as a paralegal in the local parliament of Budva. He served as president of the Socialist Youth Union of Budva, soon becoming president of the Socialist Youth Union of Montenegro. During this time, he attracted controversy for holding an outdoor meeting of the presidency where he spoke up against the old guard of the party, as well as for publishing a brochure titled "Stop Electoral Fraud" in 1984.

He was dismissed from Titograd and went back to Budva, where he became Administrator of Public Revenues, before becoming president of the local government. During this time, he renovated Budva following the earthquake in 1979, starting the Theatre City Budva (Budva Grad teatar) project in 1987 with theatre director Ljubiša Ristić.

== Anti-bureaucratic revolution ==
In January 1989, Marović seized power over the Socialist Republic of Montenegro together with his partners, Momir Bulatović and Milo Đukanović, in an administrative putsch within the League of Communists of Montenegro. With the blessings of the Serbian Communists' leader, Slobodan Milošević, it became known as the "anti-bureaucratic revolution". Marović participated after having stepped down from his position as president of the local government in Budva.

After the first multi-party parliamentary election in 1990, at which the Communist League of Montenegro (SKCG) won the majority, he became a member of Montenegro's parliament, and later served as speaker for three terms. A couple of months after their election win, SKCG was repackaged into the Democratic Party of Socialists (DPS).

== Split in DPS and crime allegations ==
Along with Đukanović and Bulatović, Marović had been a loyal supporter of Slobodan Milošević in all of his policies, but in 1997 he followed Milo Đukanović who broke away from Milošević's influence.

In 2001, former Montenegrin president Momir Bulatović released a tell-all memoir named Pravila ćutanja (The Rules of Keeping Silent), accusing Marović, among many others, of accepting large financial compensation in return for turning a blind eye to widespread oil and tobacco smuggling in Montenegro during the 1990s. Marović and Bulatović are former party colleagues. In addition to former close friendship, they share an intimate bond through the godfather relations between their families.

Despite living in close proximity, as well as sharing many personal and political connections, the two have not spoken to each other in nearly a decade. In the book, Bulatović describes a private conversation during the 1990s in which he confronted Marović about the corruption and quotes his answer: "You see, Momir, you're the first ever President of Montenegro, that's the legacy you're passing on to your children. Me, I want something more concrete to leave my kids with."

Marović never responded directly to these claims, mentioning only that he hasn't read the book. He added that he was taught "the rule of keeping silent about untruth and slander".

== Presidency 2003–2006 ==
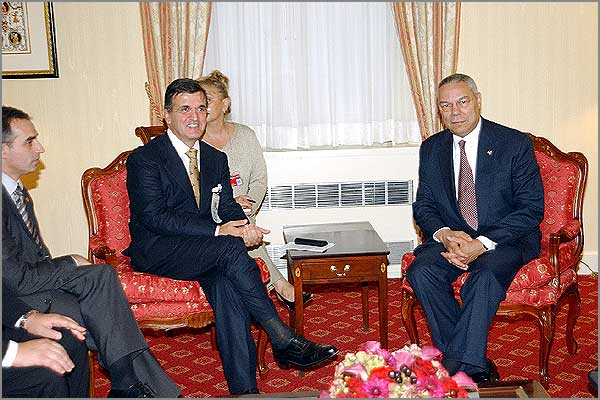
Marović and Collin Powell, United States Secretary of State in 2003

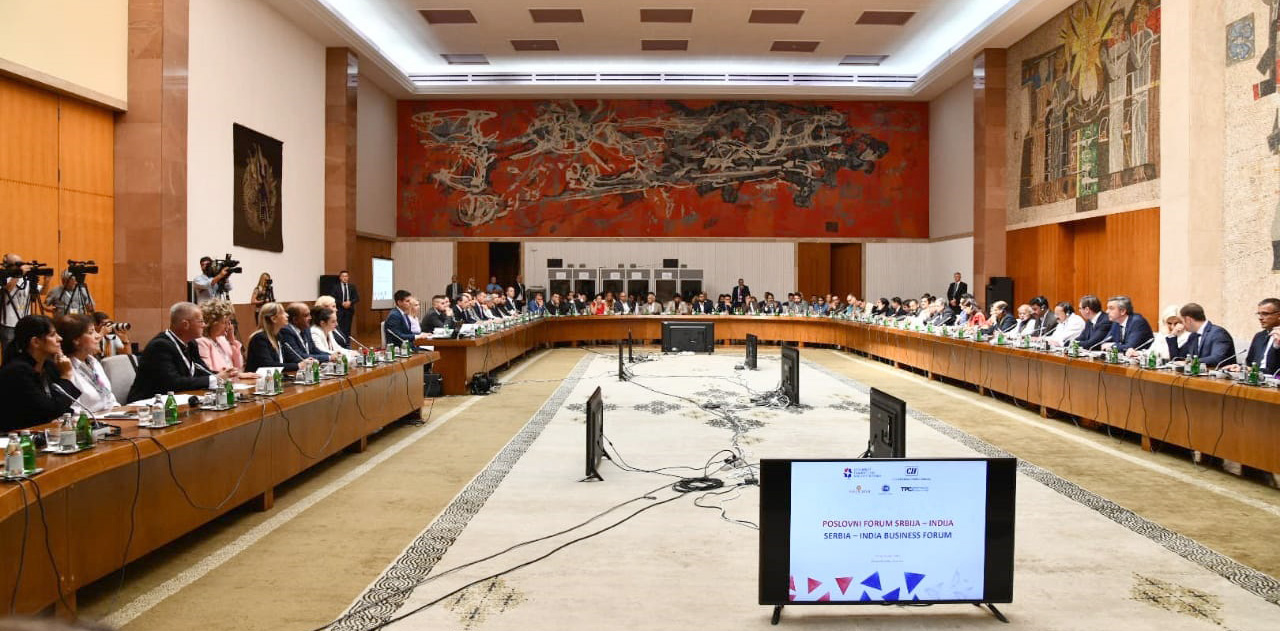
One of the chambers inside the Palace of the Federation, seat of the President and Council of Ministers of Serbia and Montenegro

As President of Serbia and Montenegro's loose state union, the position Marović found himself in was complicated. DPS, Marović's party, was the leading force of the Montenegrin separatist movement, and his party president, Milo Đukanović, a notable Montenegrin nationalist. It was difficult for Marović to reconcile the views of his administration with his duties as president.

Beginning on 7 March 2003, Marović's term in office as President of Serbia-Montenegro involved reconciliation with Croatian and Bosnian citizens. Marović was involved in a military equipment scandal that erupted in September 2005.

=== Apologies ===
On 10 September 2003, during Croatian president Stjepan Mesić's state visit to Belgrade, Marović delivered a public apology for "all evils done by any citizen of Montenegro and Serbia to anyone in Croatia". Mesić followed suit, delivering a counter-apology to "anyone whom citizens of Croatia caused any pain or damage, anytime, anyplace."

This was particularly significant because it was in contrast to his views from the beginning of the 1990s when he was the author of an infamous phrase: "war for peace," which is how he described and justified the Montenegrin reservists' assault on Dubrovnik and Konavle in 1991.

On 13 November 2003, he visited Sarajevo and issued another apology, this time to the citizens of Bosnia-Herzegovina on the behalf of Serbia-Montenegro, for "any evil or calamity that anyone in Bosnia-Herzegovina suffered at the hands of anyone from Serbia-Montenegro". Unlike Stipe Mesić few months prior, Marović's Sarajevo hosts, members of Bosnia's 3-man rotating Presidency weren't moved to reciprocate with any kind of an apology.

=== Military equipment scandal ===
On 1 September 2005, Serbian Minister of Finance Mlađan Dinkić called a press conference to publicly show a military contract signed by Svetozar Marović. It was a 5-year arrangement between Serbia-Montenegro's Council of Ministers and Mile Dragić Company of Zrenjanin, stipulating terms of equipment supply to the Army of Serbia-Montenegro (VSCG) for the period between 2006 and 2011. Dinkić revealed: "Among other things, 69,000 helmets were ordered as well as more than 60,000 body armour suits for an Army that numbers 28,000 people!? Also 500 fighter pilot jackets for a fleet of barely 30 planes!"

While the brunt of the responsibility was leveled at Minister of Defense Prvoslav Davinić, Marović was called out for signing and thus legitimizing such an obviously inflated contract that would end up costing the taxpayers of Serbia €296 million.

After budget commission confirmed Dinkić's allegations he went further on 15 September 2005, saying "it's completely clear Marović and Davinić were fully in the know about everything that went on" and also implicated several more defense ministry and army officials.

Davinić eventually resigned, the damaging contract was revoked, but Marović fought back in a written release accusing Dinkić of "libel and destroying state union's institutions". The statement continued: "As state union's president I'm responsible for everything. They should not blame anybody, they should not sue anybody, and they should not judge anybody – but me. Because of that, they should submit everything they have against me. But neither to their party investigators, nor to domestic courts they're squeezing with their temporary ministerial careers. Let them submit everything they have and more to the best, most experienced, most competent, highest paid and best regarded European and world investigators and courts and they will get an answer – that Svetozar Marović is a clean and honest man."

Over the next few days, members of Marović's cabinet, Montenegrin regime officials, as well as PM Milo Đukanović himself were all threatening to pull all Montenegrin staff from Belgrade.

When the dust somewhat settled, Dinkić announced that "budget inspection met many obstructions within Ministry of Defense during the investigation" but that it's determined "to close the issue and put on trial those who are responsible". Whether those include Davinić and Marović, Dinkić was less clear but agreed that "prosecutor's office should go as high up the chain of command as necessary".

=== 2006 Montenegrin independence vote ===
Marović's political party, the DPS, backed full independence for Montenegro, and Marović campaigned for a "yes" vote in the 2006 referendum on Montenegrin independence. This put him in the unique position of supporting the breakup of the state in which he was the head. In the wake of the referendum passing, Marović said that on 1 June 2006, he would "hold the last session of the Council of Ministers and resign...from the post of the president of the state union."

== Post-presidency ==
In 2007, Svetozar was re-elected vice-president of the Democratic Party of Socialists of Montenegro with a new agenda. During the conflicts between the Serbian Orthodox Church and the uncanonical Montenegrin Orthodox Church, Marović stated support of the SOC, being the one recognized. In October 2007, he led the DPS-SDP negotiations team on the table to reach a consensus on the new Montenegrin Constitution. The agreement was that the official language will be called Montenegrin, with both Latin and Cyrillic as official; Serbian, Bosnian, Albanian, and Croatian were recognized. Montenegro will be the state of the Montenegrin people, while Serbs, Bosniaks, Albanians, and Croats will be also mentioned in the Constitution. The Church will be separate from the state, none of them mentioned. Montenegrin citizens will not be able to have dual citizenship, however those who have before the adoption of the Declaration of Independence had multiple citizenships will keep it, effectively leaving the Montenegrins in Serbia unable to hold dual citizenship.

=== Arrest and exile ===
In 2016, Svetozar Marović, then Deputy President of ruling Democratic Party of Socialists was arrested in connection to a long-running corruption case concerning his hometown of Budva. The Montenegrin prosecutor's office labeled him as "head of Budva criminal group," which he later admitted in court. He eventually fled to neighboring Serbia for alleged psychiatric treatment in Belgrade, where he currently resides. Montenegro has repeatedly requested his extradition from Serbia.

In August 2020, Marović spoke to the media for the first time, after fleeing to Belgrade, accusing the leadership of the party he founded of corruption, nepotism, partocracy and authoritarianism, also accusing President Đukanović of rigging the corruption process against him and members of his family.

He supported Bishop Amfilohije Radović and the 2019–2020 clerical protests in Montenegro, as well endorsing opposition parties at 2020 parliamentary election which resulted in victory for opposition parties.

== Positions held ==
Political offices
Preceded by Vojislav Koštunica as President of the Federal Republic of Yugoslavia	President of Serbia and Montenegro; 2003–2006	Position abolished Serbia and Montenegro dissolved into Serbia (president Boris Tadić) and Montenegro (president Filip Vujanović)
Preceded by Dragiša Pešić as Prime Minister of the Federal Republic of Yugoslavia	Prime Minister of Serbia and Montenegro; 2003–2006	Position abolished Serbia and Montenegro dissolved into Serbia (prime minister Vojislav Koštunica) and Montenegro (prime minister Milo Đukanović)
