= Constitutional Charter of Serbia and Montenegro =

The Constitutional Charter of Serbia and Montenegro (Serbian: Уставна повеља Србије и Црне Горе, Ustavna povelja Srbije i Crne Gore) came into force on 4 February 2003, creating a confederacy between Serbia and Montenegro under one government, the State Union of Serbia and Montenegro replacing the earlier Federal Constitution.

As a result, the name Yugoslavia was consigned to history after 74 years (1929-2003).

== See also ==
- Constitution of the Federal Republic of Yugoslavia
- Constitution of Montenegro
- Constitution of Serbia
- Serbia and Montenegro
