= Serbia and Montenegro =

Country in Southeastern Europe (1992–2006)

Federal Republic of Yugoslavia (1992–2003) Савезна Република Југославија Savezna Republika Jugoslavija State Union of Serbia and Montenegro (2003–2006) Државна заједница Србија и Црна Гора Državna zajednica Srbija i Crna Gora
- 1992–2006
- Flag Coat of arms
- Anthem: "Хеј, Словени" / "Hej, Sloveni" "Hey, Slavs"
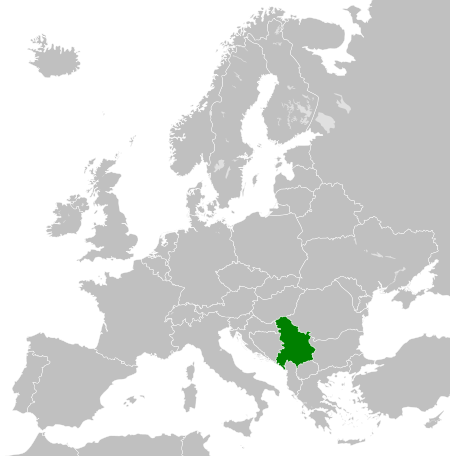
- Serbia and Montenegro in 1998
- Status: Sovereign state (Rump state of the SFR Yugoslavia; claimed sole succession until 2001)
- Capital and largest city: Belgrade^{[a]} 44°48′N 20°28′E
- Official languages: Serbian^{[b]} (1992–2003); None at the union level^{[b]} (2003–2006)
- Demonyms: Yugoslav (until 2003); Serbian · Montenegrin (from 2003)
- Government: Federal parliamentary republic (1992–2000) Federal semi-presidential republic (2000–2003) Confederated constitutional republic (2003–2006)
- President
  - 1992–1993: Dobrica Ćosić
  - 1993–1997: Zoran Lilić
  - 1997–2000: Slobodan Milošević
  - 2000–2003: Vojislav Koštunica
  - 2003–2006: Svetozar Marović
- Prime Minister
  - 1992–1993: Milan Panić
  - 1993–1998: Radoje Kontić
  - 1998–2000: Momir Bulatović
  - 2000–2001: Zoran Žižić
  - 2001–2003: Dragiša Pešić
  - 2003–2006: Svetozar Marović
- Legislature: Federal Assembly
- Historical era: Yugoslav Wars (1992–1999)
  - Constitution adopted: 27 April 1992
  - Sanctions: 1992–1995
  - Kosovo War: 1998–1999
  - Bulldozer revolution: 5 October 2000
  - Admitted to the United Nations^{[c]}: 1 November 2000
  - State Union: 4 February 2003
  - Independence of Montenegro: 3 June 2006
  - Independence of Serbia: 5 June 2006

Area
  - Total: 102,173 km^{2} (39,449 sq mi)

Population
  - 2006 estimate: 10,832,545
- GDP (PPP): 1995 estimate
  - Total: ▲$21.6 billion
  - Per capita: ▲$2,650
- HDI (1996): 0.725 high (87th)
- Currency: Serbia: Yugoslav dinar (1992–2003); Serbian dinar (2003–2006); Montenegro:^{[d]}: Yugoslav dinar (1992–2000); Deutsche Mark (1999–2002); Euro (2003–2006)
- Time zone: UTC+1 (CET)
  - Summer (DST): UTC+2 (CEST)
- Calling code: +381
- ISO 3166 code: CS
- Internet TLD: .yu
Preceded by
SFR Yugoslavia
SR Serbia
SR Montenegro
Succeeded by
1999: Kosovo Administered by the United Nations
2006: Montenegro
2006: Serbia
- Today part of: Serbia; Montenegro
- 1. After 2003, no city was the official capital, but legislative and executive institutions as well as foreign embassies remained located in Belgrade. Podgorica served as the seat of the Supreme Court.; 2. The 2003 Constitutional Charter did not mention the official language. In Serbia, the Serbo-Croatian language is in official use, while in Montenegro it is Serbian of Ijekavian pronunciation. Before that, the 1992 Constitution made Serbian official in the federation.; 3. Membership as the Federal Republic of Yugoslavia.; 4. The dinar and German mark had joint legal tender status in Montenegro in 1999 and 2000. N.B. United Nations Administered Kosovo have ad hoc used the mark since 1999 and the euro since 2002.

The State Union of Serbia and Montenegro (Note: Serbian: Државна заједница Србија и Црна Гора, Državna zajednica Srbija i Crna Gora) (often shortened to Serbia and Montenegro), (Note: Serbian: Cрбија и Црна Гора, Srbija i Crna Gora) known from 1992 to 2003 as the Federal Republic of Yugoslavia (Note: Serbian: Савезна Република Југославија, Savezna Republika Jugoslavija) (FRY) and commonly referred to as Yugoslavia, (Note: Serbian: Југославија, Jugoslavija) was a country in Southeastern Europe. It was established on 27 April 1992 as a federation comprising the Republic of Serbia and the Republic of Montenegro, following the breakup of the Socialist Federal Republic of Yugoslavia (SFR Yugoslavia). In February 2003, the federation was reconstituted as a state union. Following the secession of Montenegro in June 2006, Serbia proclaimed independence.

Its aspirations to be the sole legal successor state to the SFR Yugoslavia were not recognized by the United Nations, following the passing of United Nations Security Council Resolution 777, which affirmed that the Socialist Federal Republic of Yugoslavia had ceased to exist, and the Federal Republic of Yugoslavia was a new state. This made the Federal Republic ineligible to inherit the Socialist Federal Republic's international legal personality, since it had dissolved, with all former republics entitled to state succession. The government of Slobodan Milošević opposed any such claims, and as such, the FR Yugoslavia was not allowed to join the United Nations.

Throughout its existence, the FR Yugoslavia had a tense relationship with the international community, as economic sanctions were issued against the state during the course of the Yugoslav Wars and Kosovo War. This also resulted in hyperinflation between 1992 and 1994. The Yugoslav Wars ended with the Dayton Agreement, which recognized the independence of the Republic of Croatia, Slovenia, and Bosnia and Herzegovina, as well as establishing diplomatic relationships between the states, and a guaranteed role of the Serbian population within Bosnian politics.

Later on, growing separatism within the Autonomous Province of Kosovo and Metohija, a region of Serbia heavily populated by ethnic Albanians, resulted in an insurrection by the Kosovo Liberation Army, an Albanian separatist group. The outbreak of the Kosovo War reintroduced international sanctions, as well as eventual NATO involvement in the conflict. The conflict ended with the adoption of United Nations Security Council Resolution 1244, which guaranteed economic and political separation of Kosovo from the FR Yugoslavia, to be placed under a UN administration.

Economic hardship and war resulted in growing discontent with the government of Milošević and his allies, who ran both Serbia and Montenegro as an effective dictatorship. This eventually culminated in the Bulldozer Revolution, in which his government was overthrown and replaced by the Democratic Opposition of Serbia administration of Vojislav Koštunica. The FR Yugoslavia then relinquished the claim that it was the sole successor state to the SFR Yugoslavia, joining the UN as a new member while the SFR Yugoslavia's membership in the organization was finally extinguished after a decade of practical non-existence. The Federal Republic of Yugoslavia ended in 2003 after the Federal Assembly of Yugoslavia voted to enact the Constitutional Charter of Serbia and Montenegro, which established the State Union of Serbia and Montenegro. As such, the name Yugoslavia was consigned to history. A growing independence movement in Montenegro, led by Milo Đukanović, caused the new constitution of Serbia and Montenegro to include a clause allowing for a referendum on the question of Montenegrin independence after three years. In 2006, the referendum was called, passing by a narrow margin. This led to the dissolution of the State Union of Serbia and Montenegro and the establishment of the independent republics of Serbia and Montenegro, turning Serbia into a landlocked country.

== Name ==
When the state was established in 1992 following the breakup of the Socialist Federal Republic of Yugoslavia (SFR Yugoslavia), it adopted the official name Federal Republic of Yugoslavia (FR Yugoslavia) and claimed to continue the international legal personality and United Nations membership of the SFR Yugoslavia. This claim was not accepted by the United Nations. Security Council Resolution 777 determined that the SFR Yugoslavia had ceased to exist and that the FR Yugoslavia could not automatically continue its United Nations membership, which was regarded as belonging to the now-defunct SFR Yugoslavia. General Assembly Resolution 47/1 consequently required the FR Yugoslavia to apply for membership and barred it from participating in the work of the General Assembly. The FR Yugoslavia applied for membership in 2000 and was admitted to the United Nations as a new member on 1 November under General Assembly Resolution 55/12. In 2003, the country was reconstituted as the State Union of Serbia and Montenegro, which continued the Federal Republic's international legal personality without controversy.

== History ==
During the collapse of the SFR Yugoslavia in the 1990s the republics of Serbia and Montenegro agreed to remain as part of a state of Yugoslavia, and established a new constitution in 1992, which established the Federal Republic of Yugoslavia essentially as a rump state, with a population consisting of a majority of Serbs. The new state abandoned the Communist legacy: the red star was removed from the national flag, and the communist coat of arms was replaced in 1993 by a new coat of arms representing Serbia and Montenegro. The new state also established the office of the president, held by a single person, initially appointed with the consent of the republics of Serbia and Montenegro until 1997 after which the president was democratically elected. The President of Yugoslavia acted alongside the Presidents of the republics of Serbia and Montenegro. Initially, all three offices were dominated by allies of Slobodan Milosevic and his Socialist Party of Serbia.

=== Foundation ===
On 26 December 1991, Serbia, Montenegro, and the Serb rebel-held territories in Croatia agreed that they would form a new "third Yugoslavia". Efforts were also made in 1991 to include the Socialist Republic of Bosnia and Herzegovina within the federation, with negotiations between Miloševic, Bosnia's Serbian Democratic Party, and the Bosniak proponent of union – Bosnia's Vice-president Adil Zulfikarpašić taking place on this matter. Zulfikarpašić believed that Bosnia could benefit from a union with Serbia, Montenegro, and Krajina, thus he supported a union which would secure the unity of Serbs and Bosniaks. Milošević continued negotiations with Zulfikarpašić to include Bosnia and Herzegovina within a new Yugoslavia, but efforts to include all of Bosnia and Herzegovina within a new Yugoslavia effectively ended by late 1991 as Izetbegović planned to hold a referendum on independence while the Bosnian Serbs and Bosnian Croats formed autonomous territories. Violence between ethnic Serbs and Bosniaks soon broke out. Thus, the FR Yugoslavia was restricted to the republics of Serbia and Montenegro, and became closely associated with breakaway Serb republics during the Yugoslav Wars.

=== Yugoslav Wars ===
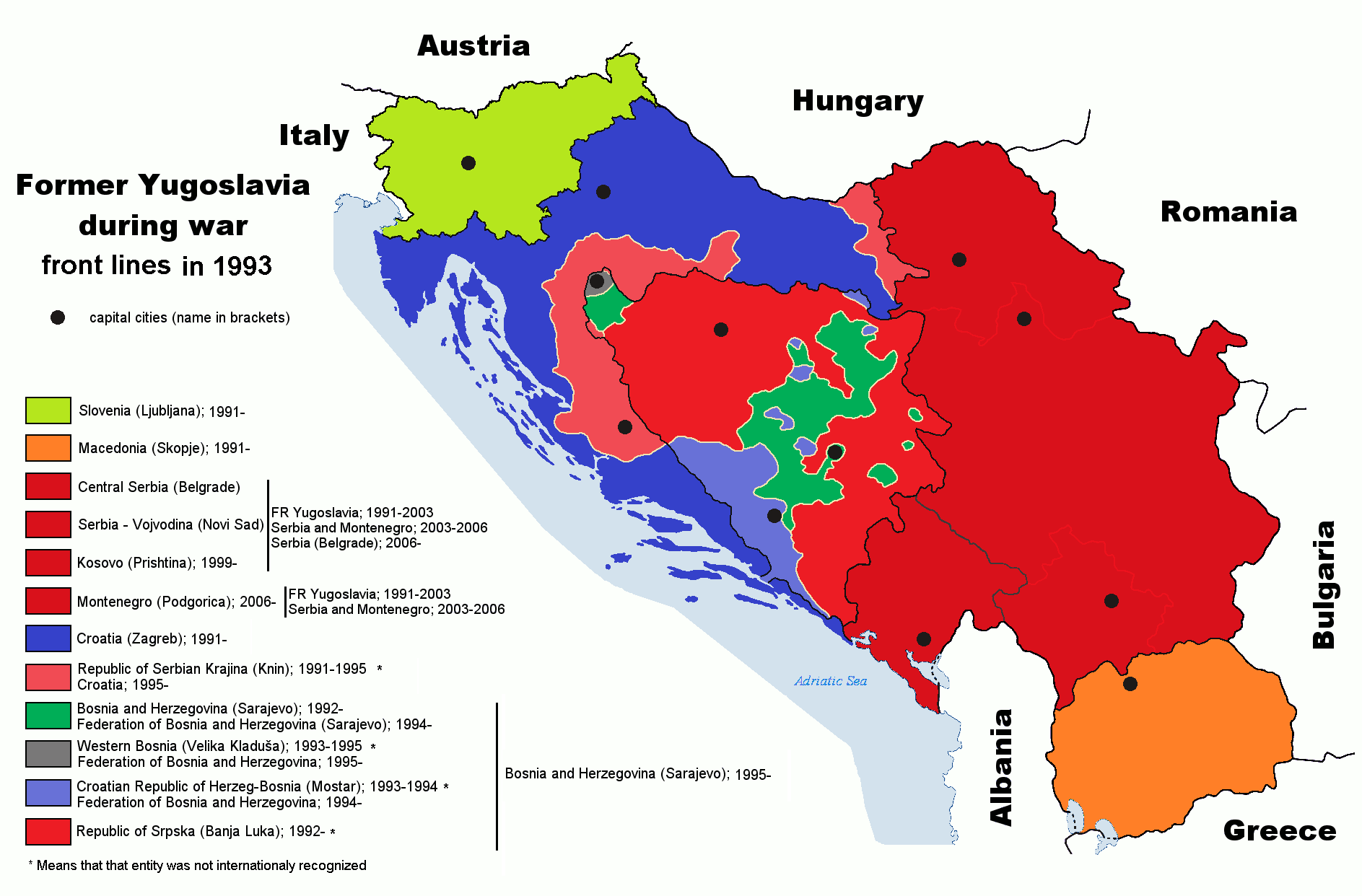
Map of the Yugoslav Wars in 1993

The FR Yugoslavia was suspended from a number of international institutions. This was due to the ongoing Yugoslav Wars during the 1990s, which had prevented agreement being reached on the disposition of federal assets and liabilities, particularly the national debt. The Government of Yugoslavia supported Croatian and Bosnian Serbs in the wars from 1992 to 1995. Because of that, the country was under economic and political sanctions. War and sanctions resulted in economic disaster, which forced thousands of its young citizens to emigrate from the country.

The FR Yugoslavia acted to support Serb separatist movements in breakaway states, including the Republic of Serbian Krajina and the Republika Srpska, and sought to establish them as independent Serbian republics, with potential eventual reintegration with FR Yugoslavia. The Government of FR Yugoslavia treated these republics as separate entities, and gave unofficial, rather than active, aid by transferring control of units from the now-defunct JNA to the secessionist movements. In this way, FR Yugoslavia avoided potential accusations of committing acts of aggression against the breakaway republics recognised by the international community.

Following the transfer of Yugoslav Army units, Yugoslavia ceased to play an important military role in the Yugoslav Wars, barring conflicts on the border with Croatia, such as the Siege of Dubrovnik. It instead provided economic and political aid, to avoid provoking the international community further, and to preserve the FR Yugoslavia as the republics of Serbia and Montenegro, rather than 'Greater Serbia.'

In 1995, following Operation Storm, a military offensive by the Croatian Army, and NATO involvement in the Bosnian War, President Slobodan Milošević agreed to negotiate, as the Serbian position within Bosnia had become substantially worse. Under threat of economically crippling the Republika Srpska, he took over negotiating powers for all Serbian secessionist movements, as well as the FR Yugoslavia. The ensuing Dayton Agreements, signed between representatives from the Federal Republic of Yugoslavia, the Republic of Bosnia and Herzegovina and the Republic of Croatia, resulted in each state being recognised as sovereign states. It also provided recognition for Serbian institutions and a rotating presidency within Bosnia and Herzegovina, and the Serbian populated areas of the former Socialist Republic of Bosnia were absorbed into Bosnia and Herzegovina. Thus the Yugoslav Wars ended, and international sanctions on the FR Yugoslavia were lifted. Slobodan Milošević did not achieve his dreams of admitting the FR Yugoslavia to the United Nations as the successor state of the SFR Yugoslavia, as an 'outer wall' of international sanctions prohibited this.

=== Economic collapse during Yugoslav Wars ===
Following the adoption of economic sanctions by the international community against the FR Yugoslavia, its economy experienced a collapse. Sanctions on fuel meant that fuel stations across the country ran out of petrol, and foreign assets were seized. The average income of inhabitants of the FR Yugoslavia was halved from $3,000 to $1,500. An estimated 3 million Yugoslavs (Serbs and Montenegrins) lived below the poverty line, suicide rates increased by 22% and hospitals lacked basic equipment. Along with this, supply links were cut, which meant that the Yugoslav economy could not grow, and imports or exports needed for industries could not be obtained, forcing them to close. The crippled state of the Yugoslav economy also affected its ability to wage war, and after 1992, Yugoslavia had an extremely limited military role within the Yugoslav Wars, due to Yugoslav Army (VJ) units being unable to operate without oil or munitions.

On top of this, starting in 1992 and until 1994, the Yugoslav dinar in Serbia and Montenegro experienced a major hyperinflation, leading to inflation reaching 313 million percent, the third worst hyperinflation in history. Many parts of the FR Yugoslavia, including all of Montenegro, adopted the Deutsche Mark and Euro currencies instead of the Yugoslav dinar. International sanctions crippled the Yugoslav economy, and prevented it from playing an active role in aiding Serb breakaway republics. Following the Dayton Agreement, the UN Security Council voted to lift most sanctions, but they were reissued following the outbreak of an Albanian insurgency in Kosovo. The lasting economic impact can be attributed to the eventual downfall of the FR Yugoslavia and Slobodan Milošević's government, as well as a deeper desire in Montenegro to leave Yugoslavia.

=== Kosovo War ===
In the Autonomous Province of Kosovo and Metohija, a growing desire for independence emerged among the Albanian majority population. Already, an unrecognised Republic of Kosova had emerged with underground institutions. In 1996, the Kosovo Liberation Army, an Albanian militia promoting Kosovar independence, launched attacks against Serbian police stations, killing at least ten Serbian policemen in direct attacks between 1996 and 1998. The low level insurgency eventually escalated. After Slobodan Milošević was elected President of Yugoslavia in 1997, having served his maximum two terms as President of Serbia, he ordered Yugoslav Army (VJ) units to move into Kosovo to aid in the suppression of the insurrection. The governments of the FR Yugoslavia and the US declared the Kosovo Liberation Army a terrorist organisation, following repeated deadly attacks against Yugoslav law enforcement agencies. US intelligence also mentioned illegal arms sources of the Kosovo Liberation Army, including conducting raids during the course of the 1997 Albanian civil unrest, and drug dealing. Despite this, substantial evidence now shows that the CIA had aided in training units of the KLA, although not necessarily providing them with arms and funding.

In 1998, the Kosovo War began, following increased open combat with Yugoslav police and army units deployed by Milošević. The KLA found itself heavily outnumbered and outgunned in open combat, and had to use guerrilla tactics. Serbian police and VJ units attacked KLA outposts, attempting to destroy them, as KLA units attempted to avoid direct confrontation and use terrorist attacks, including bombings and ambushes, to weaken Yugoslav control. Although unable to gain a strategic advantage, Yugoslav Army units found themselves in a tactical advantage against KLA units which lacked proper training. VJ units themselves lacked morale, and attacks were often directed against civilian targets rather than military targets. (Note: The Kosovo Liberation Army had limited active members; as such, Yugoslav units could often not find any KLA units throughout their stay in Kosovo.) 863,000 Albanian civilians were forcibly expelled between March and June 1999 from Kosovo. 169,824 Serb and Romani civilians were estimated by the UNHCR's Belgrade office to have fled from Kosovo-Metohija to either Serbia proper, the Autonomous Province of Vojvodina, or the constituent Republic of Montenegro by 20 June 1999. Out of 10,317 civilians, 8,676 Albanians, 1,196 Serbs and 445 Roma, Bosniaks, Montenegrins and others were killed or went missing in connection with the war between 1 January 1998 - 31 December 2000. The Serbian government attributed 1,953 Serbian, 361 Albanian and 266 other civilian deaths or disappearances from 1 January 1998 - 1 November 2001 to "Albanian terrorism in Kosovo-Metohija".

The international community was quick to respond, issuing a peace proposal to Yugoslavia in 1999. The agreement was seen as essentially an ultimatum by NATO to Yugoslavia, and this was rejected by the Yugoslav government. NATO responded in March 1999 by ordering airstrikes against Yugoslav military targets and infrastructure, including roads, railroads, administrative buildings and the headquarters of Radio Television Serbia. NATO's bombing campaign was not approved by the UN Security Council, for fear of a veto by Russia, which would cause controversy as to its legality. The UN Security Council adopted United Nations Security Council Resolution 1160, renewing arms and oil sanctions against the FR Yugoslavia, and thus crippling its economy. The effects of continuous aerial bombardment and sanctions cost the Yugoslav economy hundreds of billions of USD and eventually forced Milošević's government to comply with an agreement put forward by an international delegation. United Nations Security Council Resolution 1244 led to substantial autonomy for Kosovo, and the establishment of a UN mission to Kosovo, as well as the complete withdrawal of units of the Yugoslav National Army. As such, Kosovo remained an Autonomous Province of Serbia, but politically and economically independent. The damage to The FR Yugoslavia was immense, with the government estimating $100 billion in infrastructure damage, as well as 1,200 Serbian and Albanian civilians or soldiers confirmed dead. Economists have estimated at least $29 billion in direct damages caused by the bombings.

In the aftermath of the Kosovo War, a low level insurgency continued in the Presevo valley in southern Serbia, which had Albanian minorities. The insurgent (UCPMB) lacked resources, and the Yugoslav Armed Forces and police were able to put down the insurgency.

=== Overthrow of Slobodan Milošević ===
The string of defeats, as well as a complete collapse of the Yugoslav economy, led to mass unpopularity of Slobodan Milošević and his allies in the Socialist Party of Serbia. In September 2000, amongst accusations of electoral fraud, large scale protests struck the nation. Milošević was eventually removed from power, as his Socialist Party of Serbia lost in the federal elections to the Democratic Opposition of Serbia. In the aftermath, a new government in Yugoslavia negotiated with the United Nations, accepting that it was not the sole legal successor to the Socialist Federal Republic of Yugoslavia, and was allowed to join the UN. Milošević would later be put on trial for corruption and war crimes, especially during the International Criminal Tribunal for the former Yugoslavia, although he died in prison before his trial could end in 2006. His culpability remains a subject of controversy within Serbia.

=== Gradual dissolution ===
In March 2002, the governments of Montenegro and Serbia, along with the Federal Republic of Yugoslavia (FRY), signed the Accord on Principles in Relations between Serbia and Montenegro (commonly known as the Belgrade Agreement), which outlined the restructuring of their mutual relations. This agreement led to the adoption of the Constitutional Charter of Serbia and Montenegro on 4 February 2003, officially transforming the FRY into the State Union of Serbia and Montenegro and formally retiring the name "Yugoslavia" after 74 years.

The Constitutional Charter included a provision allowing either republic to hold a referendum on independence after a three-year transition period. On 21 May 2006, Montenegro held such a referendum. The final results showed that 55.5% of voters supported independence, narrowly surpassing the 55% threshold set by the European Union for the referendum's validity. Voter turnout was 86.5%.

Following the referendum, Montenegro's parliament formally declared independence on 3 June 2006. Subsequently, on 5 June 2006, Serbia's parliament did the same, effectively dissolving the union and marking the final chapter in the disintegration of the former Yugoslavia.

== Politics ==
The Federal Assembly of Yugoslavia, representing the FR Yugoslavia (1992–2003) was composed of two chambers: the Council of Citizens and the Council of Republics. Whereas the Council of Citizens served as an ordinary assembly, elected by and representing the people, the Council of Republics was made equally by representatives from the federation's constituent republics, to ensure federal equality between Serbia and Montenegro. The president, a political figurehead, was elected by the Federal Assembly, which could dismiss the president for violating the constitution, while the prime minister ran the government.

The first president from 1992 to 1993 was Dobrica Ćosić, a former communist Yugoslav partisan during World War II and later one of the fringe contributors of the controversial Memorandum of the Serbian Academy of Sciences and Arts. Despite being head of the country, Ćosić was forced out of office in 1993 due to his opposition to Serbian President Slobodan Milošević. Ćosić was replaced by Zoran Lilić who served from 1993 to 1997, and then followed by Milošević becoming Yugoslav President in 1997 after his last legal term as Serbian president ended in 1997. The FR Yugoslavia was dominated by Milosevic and his allies, until the presidential election in 2000. There were accusations of vote fraud and Yugoslav citizens took to the streets and engaged in riots in Belgrade demanding that Milošević be removed from power. Shortly afterwards Milošević resigned and Vojislav Koštunica took over as Yugoslav president and remained president until the state's reconstitution as the State Union of Serbia and Montenegro.

Federal Prime Minister Milan Panić became frustrated with Milošević's domineering behaviour during diplomatic talks in 1992 and told Milošević to "shut up" because Milošević's position was officially subordinate to his position. Milošević later forced Panić to resign. This situation changed after 1997 when Milošević's second and last legal term as Serbian President ended. He then had himself elected Federal President, thus entrenching the power that he already de facto held.

After the Federal Republic was reconstituted as a State Union, the new Assembly of the State Union was created. It was unicameral and was made up of 126 deputies, of which 91 were from Serbia and 35 were from Montenegro. The Assembly convened in the building of the old Federal Assembly of Yugoslavia, which now houses the National Assembly of Serbia. A direct, nationwide election was planned for 2005, but was subsequently delayed to 2006 in Montenegro and 2007 in Serbia to coincide with local parliamentary elections. Since the State Union dissolved before either was held, direct parliamentary elections were never held and the deputies were instead elected indirectly by the parliament of their respective republic.

In 2003, after the constitutional changes and creation of the State Union of Serbia and Montenegro, a new President of Serbia and Montenegro was elected by the confederal assembly. He was also president of the Council of Ministers of Serbia and Montenegro. Svetozar Marović was the first and last President of Serbia and Montenegro until its breakup in 2006.

On 12 April 1999, the Federal Assembly of the FR Yugoslavia passed the "Decision on the accession of the Federal Republic of Yugoslavia to the Union State of Russia and Belarus". Although Serbia is, according to constitutional and international law, the successor state to this decision (as well as many others made during Milošević's presidency), in practice, after the Bulldozer Revolution, nothing has been done in this direction, as the country is a candidate for the European Union.

== Military ==
The Armed Forces of Serbia and Montenegro (Serbian: Војска Србије и Црне Горе/Vojska Srbije i Crne Gore, ВСЦГ/VSCG), previously known as Army of Yugoslavia (Serbian: Војска Југославије/Vojska Jugoslavije, ВЈ/VJ) included ground forces with internal and border troops, naval forces, air and air defense forces, and civil defense. It was established from the remnants of the Yugoslav People's Army (JNA), the military of the SFR Yugoslavia. Several Bosnian Serb units of the VJ were transferred over to the Republika Srpska, during the course of the Bosnian War, leaving only units directly from Serbia and Montenegro in the armed forces. The VJ saw military action during the Yugoslav Wars, including the Siege of Dubrovnik, as well as the Kosovo War, and played combat roles during ethnic insurgencies. Following the Kosovo War, the VJ was forced to evacuate Kosovo, and in 2003 it was renamed the ''Armed Forces of Serbia and Montenegro.'' Following the dissolution of the Union between Serbia and Montenegro, units from each army were assigned to the independent republics of Serbia and Montenegro, as recruitment in the army was on a local, rather than Federal, level. Montenegro inherited the small navy of the FR Yugoslavia, due to Serbia being landlocked.

== Administrative divisions ==
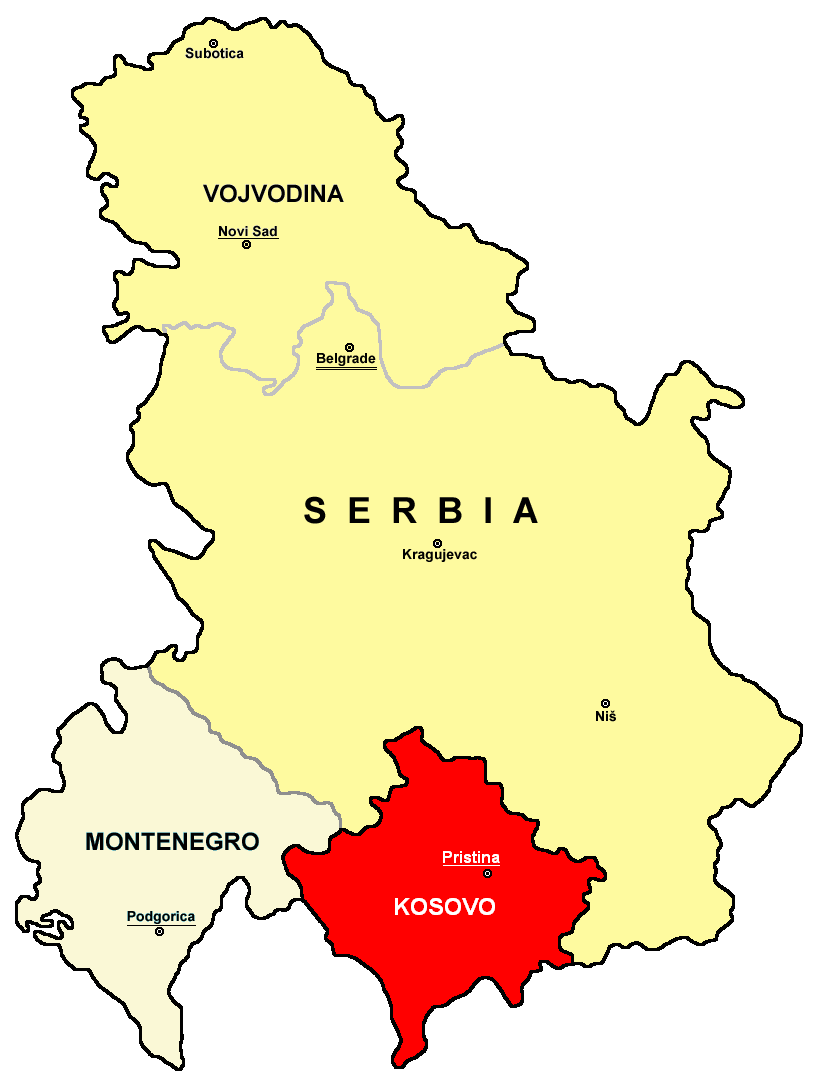
Map of the territorial subdivisions of the FR Yugoslavia

The FR Yugoslavia was composed of two Republics:

- The Republic of Serbia (capital: Belgrade), which included two autonomous provinces:
  - Vojvodina, Autonomous province within Serbia (capital: Novi Sad).
  - Kosovo and Metohija – Autonomous province within Serbia (capital: Priština). In June 1999, Kosovo became an entity under interim international administration.
- The Republic of Montenegro (capital: Podgorica, Royal capital: Cetinje).

FR Yugoslavia operated under cooperative federalism, where federal and regional governments cooperate with each other by overlapping certain responsibilities and duties.

Name	Capital	Flag	Coat of arms or emblem
Republic of Serbia	Belgrade		
Autonomous Province of Vojvodina	Novi Sad		
Autonomous Province of Kosovo and Metohija	Pristina		
Republic of Montenegro	Cetinje		
Republic of Montenegro	Podgorica		

=== Serbia ===
The territorial organisation of the Republic of Serbia was regulated by the Law on Territorial Organisation and Local Self-Government, adopted in the Assembly of Serbia on 24 July 1991. Under the Law, the municipalities, cities and settlements make the bases of the territorial organization.

Serbia was divided into 195 municipalities and 4 cities, which were the basic units of local autonomy. It had two autonomous provinces: Kosovo and Metohija in the south (with 30 municipalities), which was under the administration of UNMIK after 1999, and Vojvodina in the north (with 46 municipalities and 1 city). The territory between Kosovo and Vojvodina was called Central Serbia. Central Serbia was not an administrative division on its own and had no regional government of its own.

In addition, there were four cities: Belgrade, Niš, Novi Sad and Kragujevac, each having an assembly and budget of its own. The cities comprised several municipalities, divided into "urban" (in the city proper) and "other" (suburban). Competences of cities and their municipalities were divided.

Municipalities were gathered into districts, which are regional centres of state authority, but have no assemblies of their own; they present purely administrative divisions, and host various state institutions such as funds, office branches and courts. The Republic of Serbia was then and is still today divided into 29 districts (17 in Central Serbia, 7 in Vojvodina and 5 in Kosovo, which are now defunct), while the city of Belgrade presents a district of its own.

=== Montenegro ===
Montenegro was divided into 21 municipalities.

== Geography ==
Serbia and Montenegro had an area of 102,350 square kilometres (39,518 sq mi), with 199 kilometres (124 mi) of coastline. The terrain of the two republics is extremely varied, with much of Serbia comprising plains and low hills (except in the more mountainous region of Kosovo and Metohija) and much of Montenegro consisting of high mountains. Serbia is entirely landlocked, with the coastline belonging to Montenegro. The climate is similarly varied. The north has a continental climate (cold winters and hot summers); the central region has a combination of a continental and Mediterranean climate; the southern region had an Adriatic climate along the coast, with inland regions experiencing hot, dry summers and autumns and relatively cold winters with heavy snowfall inland.

Belgrade, with its population of 1,574,050, is the largest city in the two nations: and the only one of significant size. The country's other principal cities were Novi Sad, Niš, Kragujevac, Podgorica, Subotica, Pristina, and Prizren, each with populations of about 100,000–250,000 people.

== Demographics ==
Demographics of the FR Yugoslavia in 1992
1. Serbs (62.6%)
2. Albanians (16.5%)
3. Montenegrins (5.00%)
4. Others (15.9%)

The FR Yugoslavia had more demographic variety than most other European countries. According to the 1992 census, the Federal Republic had 10,394,026 inhabitants. The three largest named nationalities were Serbs (6,504,048 inhabitants, or 62.6%), Albanians (1,714,768 inhabitants, or 16.5%), and Montenegrins (519,766 inhabitants, or 5%). The country also had significant populations of Hungarians, ethnic Yugoslavs, ethnic Muslims, Romani, Croats, Bulgarians, Macedonians, Romanians and Vlachs, and others (under 1%). Most of the ethnic diversity was situated in the autonomous provinces of Kosovo and Vojvodina, where smaller numbers of other minority groups could be found. The large Albanian population was chiefly concentrated in Kosovo, with smaller populations in the Preševo Valley, and in the Ulcinj municipality in Montenegro. The Muslim (Slavic Muslims, including Bosniaks and Gorani) population lived mostly in the federal border region (mainly Novi Pazar in Serbia, and Rožaje in Montenegro). The Montenegrin population at the time often considered themselves to be Serbs.

Total population of the FR Yugoslavia – 10,019,657

- Serbia (total): 9,396,411
  - Vojvodina: 2,116,725
  - Central Serbia: 5,479,686
  - Kosovo: 1,800,000
- Montenegro: 623,246
- Major cities (over 100,000 inhabitants) – 2002 data (2003 for Podgorica):
  - Beograd (Belgrade): 1,280,639 (1,574,050 metro)
  - Novi Sad: 215,600 (298,139 metro)
  - Pristina: 200,000 (2002 estimate)
  - Niš: 173,390 (234,863 metro)
  - Kragujevac: 145,890 (175,182 metro)
  - Podgorica: 139,500 (169,000 metro)
  - Prizren: 121,000 (2002 estimate)
  - Subotica: 99,471 (147,758 metro)

More than half of Kosovo's pre-1999 Serb population (226,000), including 37,000 Romani, 15,000 Balkan Muslims (including Ashkali, Bosniaks, and Gorani), and 7,000 other non-Albanian civilians were expelled to central Serbia and Montenegro, following the Kosovo War.

According to a 2004 estimate, the State Union had 10,825,900 inhabitants. According to a July 2006 estimate, the State Union had 10,832,545 inhabitants.

== Economy ==
The state suffered significantly economically due to the breakup of Yugoslavia and mismanagement of the economy, and an extended period of economic sanctions. In the early 1990s, the FRY suffered from hyperinflation of the Yugoslav dinar. By the mid-1990s, the FRY had overcome the inflation. Further damage to Yugoslavia's infrastructure and industry caused by the Kosovo War left the economy only half the size it was in 1990. Since the ousting of former Federal Yugoslav President Slobodan Milošević in October 2000, the Democratic Opposition of Serbia (DOS) coalition government has implemented stabilization measures and embarked on an aggressive market reform program. FRY renewed its membership in the International Monetary Fund in December 2000. Afterwards, it continued to reintegrate with other world nations by rejoining organizations like the World Bank and the European Bank for Reconstruction and Development.

The smaller republic of Montenegro severed its economy from federal control and from Serbia during the Milošević era. Afterwards, the two republics had separate central banks whilst Montenegro began to use different currencies – it first adopted the Deutsche Mark and continued to use it until the Mark fell into disuse to be replaced by the Euro. Serbia continued to use the Yugoslav Dinar, renaming it the Serbian Dinar.

The complexity of the FRY's political relationships, slow progress in privatisation, and stagnation in the European economy were detrimental to the economy. Arrangements with the IMF, especially requirements for fiscal discipline, were an important element in policy formation. Severe unemployment was a key political and economic problem. Corruption also presented a major problem, with a large black market and a high degree of criminal involvement in the formal economy.

== Transport ==
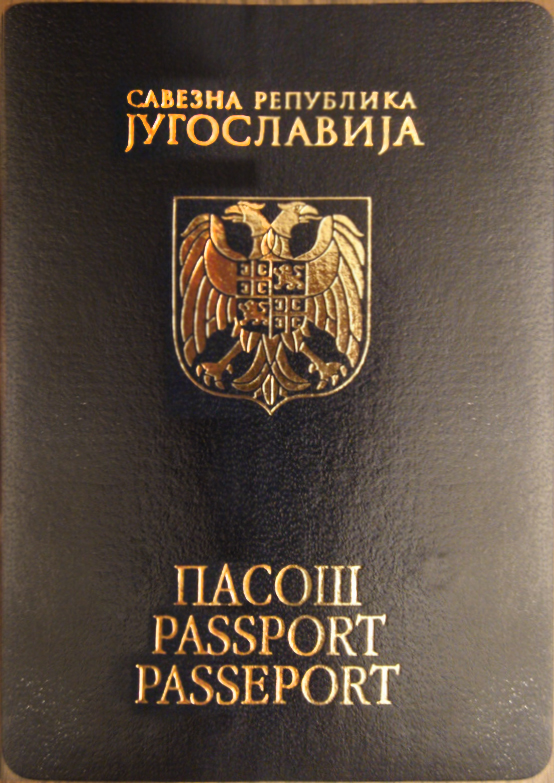
Passport of the Federal Republic of Yugoslavia (Yugoslav passport)

Serbia, and in particular the valley of the Morava is often described as "the crossroads between the East and the West" – one of the primary reasons for its turbulent history. The valley is by far the easiest land route from continental Europe to Greece and Asia Minor.

Major international highways going through Serbia were E75 and E70. E763/E761 was the most important route connecting Serbia with Montenegro.

The Danube, an important international waterway, flowed through Serbia.

The Port of Bar was the largest seaport located in Montenegro.

== Holidays ==
Holidays
Date	Name	Notes
1 January	New Year's Day	(non-working holiday)
7 January	Orthodox Christmas	(non-working)
27 January	Saint Sava's feast Day – Day of Spirituality	
27 April	Constitution Day	
29 April	Orthodox Good Friday	Date for 2005 only
1 May	Orthodox Easter	Date for 2005 only
2 May	Orthodox Easter Monday	Date for 2005 only
1 May	Labour Day	(non-working)
9 May	Victory Day	
28 June	Vidovdan (Martyr's Day)	In memory of soldiers fallen at the Battle of Kosovo
29 November	Republic Day	

Holidays celebrated only in Serbia

- 15 February – Sretenje (National Day, non-working)

Holidays celebrated only in Montenegro

- 13 July – Statehood Day (non-working)

== Proposed national flag and anthem for the State Union ==
Proposed flag for Serbia and Montenegro

After the formation of the State Union of Serbia and Montenegro, the Yugoslav tricolour was to be replaced by a new compromise flag. Article 23 of the Law for the implementation of the Constitutional Charter stated that a law specifying the new flag was to be passed within 60 days of the first session of the new joint parliament. Among the flag proposals, the popular choice was a flag with a shade of blue in between the Serbian tricolor and the Montenegrin tricolor of 1993 through 2004. The color shade Pantone 300C was perceived as the best choice. However, the parliament failed to vote on the proposal within the legal time-frame. In 2004, Montenegro adopted a radically different flag, as its independence-leaning government sought to distance itself from Serbia. Proposals for a compromise flag were dropped after this and the Union of Serbia and Montenegro never adopted a flag.

A similar fate befell the country's state anthem and coat-of-arms to be; the above-mentioned Article 23 also stipulated that a law determining the State Union's flag and anthem was to be passed by the end of 2003. The official proposal for a state anthem was a combination piece consisting of one verse of the former (now current) Serbian national anthem "Bože pravde" followed by a verse of the Montenegrin folk song, "Oj, svijetla majska zoro". This proposal was dropped after some public opposition, notably by Serbian Patriarch Pavle. Another legal deadline passed and no state anthem was adopted. Serious proposals for the coat of arms were never put forward, probably because the coat of arms of the FRY, adopted in 1994 combining Serbian and Montenegrin heraldic elements, was considered adequate.

Thus, the State Union never officially adopted state symbols and continued to use the flag and national anthem of the Federal Republic of Yugoslavia by inertia until its dissolution in 2006.

== Sports ==
=== Association football ===
The FR Yugoslavia, later Serbia and Montenegro, was considered by FIFA and UEFA to be the only successor-state of Yugoslavia. Football was experiencing major success during the 1980s and early 1990s, but due to the imposed economic sanctions, the country was excluded from all international competitions between 1992 and 1996. After the sanctions were lifted, the national team qualified for two FIFA World Cups—in 1998 as FR Yugoslavia and in 2006 as Serbia and Montenegro. It also qualified for Euro 2000, as FR Yugoslavia.

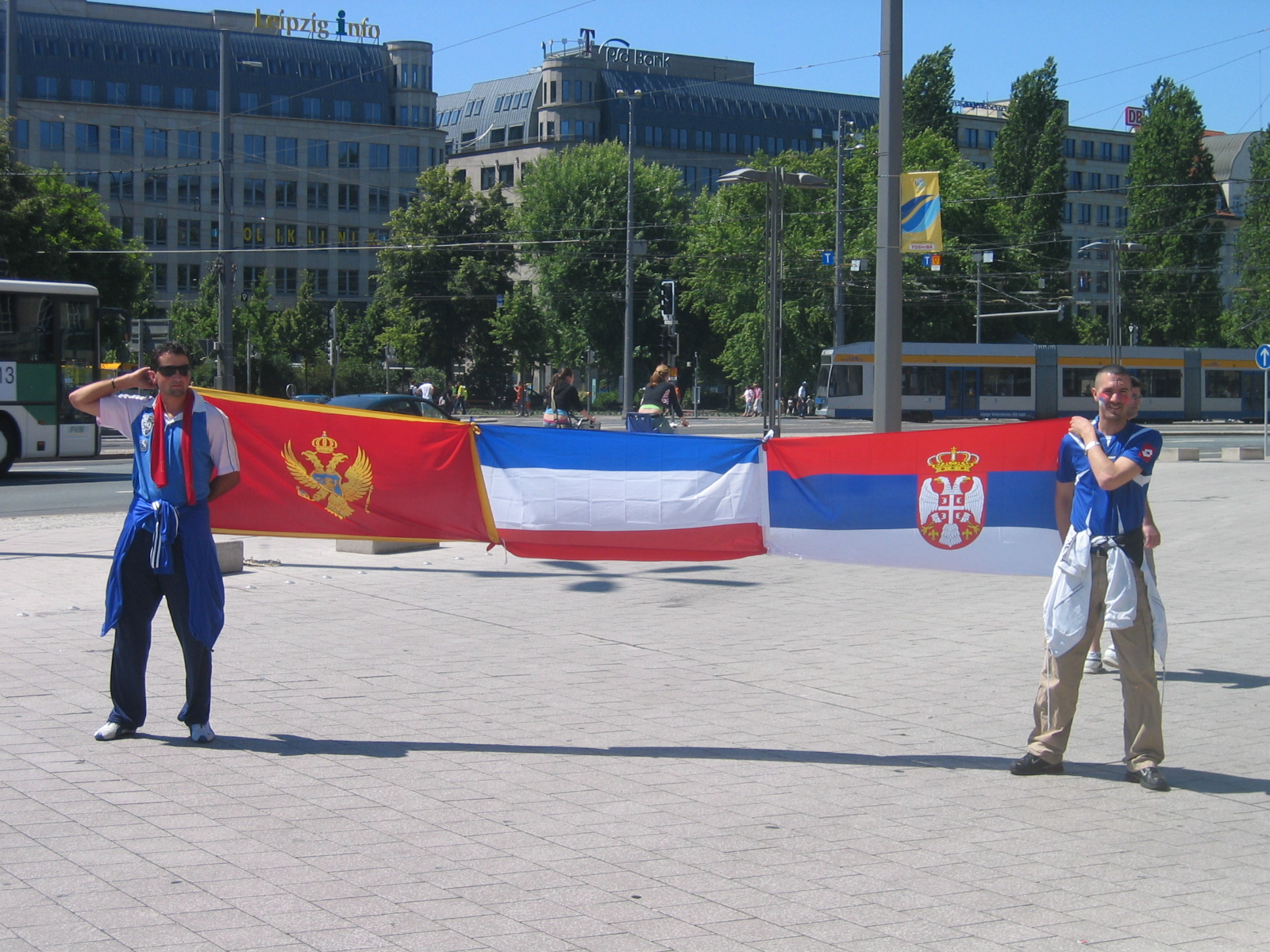
Supporters of the national football team during the 2006 FIFA World Cup

They played their last ever international on 21 June 2006, a 3–2 loss to Ivory Coast. Following the World Cup, this team has been inherited by Serbia, while a new one was to be organized to represent Montenegro in future international competitions.

=== Basketball ===
The senior men's basketball team dominated European and world basketball during the mid-to-late 1990s and early 2000s, with three EuroBasket titles (1995, 1997, and 2001), two FIBA World Cup titles (1998 and 2002), and a Summer Olympic Games silver medal (1996).

The national team started competing internationally in 1995, after a three-year exile, due to a UN trade embargo. During that time, the FR Yugoslavia was not allowed to compete at the 1992 Summer Olympics in Barcelona, the 1993 EuroBasket, and also the 1994 FIBA World Championship, which was originally supposed to be hosted by Belgrade, before being taken away from the city and moved to Toronto, Canada.

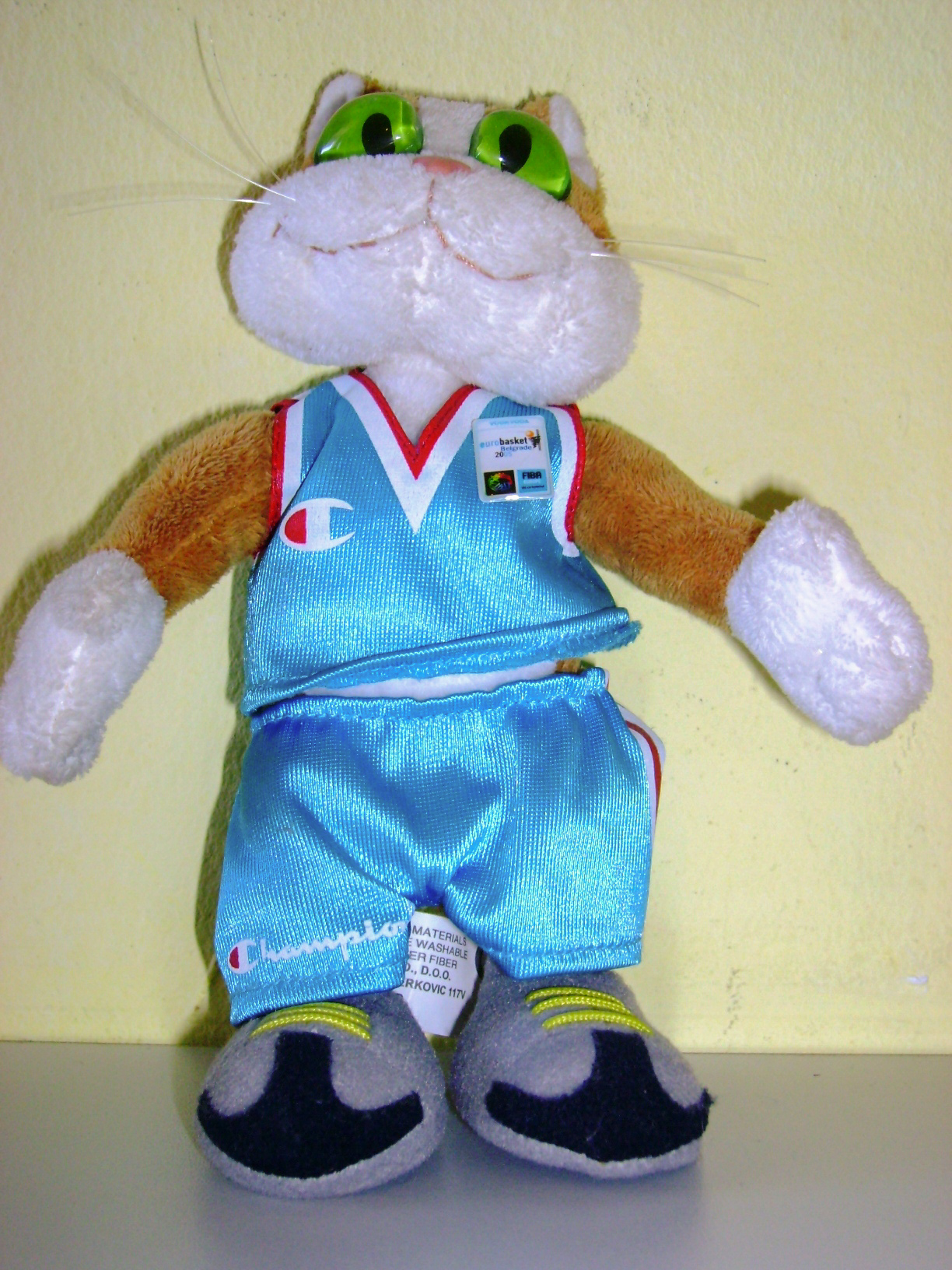
Mascot of the EuroBasket 2005, hosted by Serbia and Montenegro

At the 1995 EuroBasket in Athens, its first international competition, the FR Yugoslav team, which was led by head coach Dušan Ivković, featured a starting five full of world-class talent, with established European stars at positions one through four — 27-year-old Saša Đorđević, 25-year-old Predrag Danilović, 29-year-old Žarko Paspalj, 22-year-old Dejan Bodiroga — capped off with 27-year-old Vlade Divac, the starting center for the LA Lakers at the five position. With a bench that was just as capable — with experienced Zoran Sretenović (the only player over 30 in the team), Saša Obradović, talisman power forward Zoran Savić, and up-and-coming young center Željko Rebrača — the team rampaged through its preliminary group, which featured medal contenders Greece and Lithuania, with a 6–0 record. At the first direct elimination stage, the quarterfinals, the FR Yugoslavia scored 104 points to destroy France, thus setting up a semifinal clash with the tournament hosts Greece. In the highly charged atmosphere of the OAKA Indoor Arena, the FR Yugoslav team demonstrated its versatility, using defensive prowess in that game to pull off a famous eight-point win, in a tense, low-scoring 60–52 game. In the final, the FR Yugoslavia played against the experienced Lithuanian team, which was led by basketball legend Arvydas Sabonis, in addition to other world class players like Šarūnas Marčiulionis, Rimas Kurtinaitis, and Valdemaras Chomičius. The final became a classic game of international basketball, with the Yugoslavs prevailing, by a score of 96–90, behind Đorđević's 41 points.

They were represented by a single team at the 2006 FIBA World Championship as well, even though the tournament was played in mid/late-August and early-September of that year, and the Serbia–Montenegro breakup had occurred in May. That team was also inherited by Serbia after the tournament, while Montenegro created a separate senior national basketball team afterwards, as well as their own national teams in all other team sports.

== Entertainment ==
Serbia and Montenegro participated in the Eurovision Song Contest on two occasions and in Junior Eurovision Song Contest 2005 only on one occasion. The country debuted in the Eurovision Song Contest under the name Serbia and Montenegro in 2004, when Željko Joksimović got second place. In 2006, the year of Montenegrin independence, the country Serbia and Montenegro did not have a representative due to the scandal in Evropesma 2006, but was still able to vote in both the semi-final and the final.

== See also ==
- Serbian–Montenegrin unionism
- Montenegro–Serbia relations

== Notes ==
Region	until 1918	1918– 1929	1929– 1945	1941– 1945	1945– 1946	1946– 1963	1963– 1992	1992– 2003	2003– 2006	2006– 2008	since 2008
Slovenia	Part of Austria-Hungary including the Bay of Kotor See also: Kingdom of Croatia-Slavonia (1868–1918) Kingdom of Dalmatia (1815–1918) Condominium of Bosnia and Herzegovina (1878–1918)	State of Slovenes, Croats and Serbs (1918) Kingdom of Serbs, Croats and Slovenes (1918–1929) Kingdom of Yugoslavia (1929–1943) See also: Republic of Prekmurje (1919) Banat, Bačka and Baranja (1918–1919) Free State of Fiume (1920–1924) (1924–1945) Italian province of Zadar (1920–1947)		Annexed by Italy, Germany, and Hungary^{a}	Democratic Federal Yugoslavia (1943–1945) Federal People's Republic of Yugoslavia (1945–1963) Socialist Federal Republic of Yugoslavia (1963–1992) Consisted of the Socialist Republics of: Slovenia (1945–1991); Croatia (1945–1991); Bosnia and Herzegovina (1945–1992) Serbia (1945–1992) (included the autonomous provinces of Vojvodina and Kosovo) Montenegro (1945–1992); Macedonia (1945–1991) See also: Free Territory of Trieste (1947–1954)^{h}			Republic of Slovenia; Ten-Day War			
Dalmatia	Part of Austria-Hungary including the Bay of Kotor See also: Kingdom of Croatia-Slavonia (1868–1918) Kingdom of Dalmatia (1815–1918) Condominium of Bosnia and Herzegovina (1878–1918)	State of Slovenes, Croats and Serbs (1918) Kingdom of Serbs, Croats and Slovenes (1918–1929) Kingdom of Yugoslavia (1929–1943) See also: Republic of Prekmurje (1919) Banat, Bačka and Baranja (1918–1919) Free State of Fiume (1920–1924) (1924–1945) Italian province of Zadar (1920–1947)		Independent State of Croatia (1941–1945) Puppet state of Germany. Parts annexed by Italy. Međimurje and Baranja annexed by Hungary.	Democratic Federal Yugoslavia (1943–1945) Federal People's Republic of Yugoslavia (1945–1963) Socialist Federal Republic of Yugoslavia (1963–1992) Consisted of the Socialist Republics of: Slovenia (1945–1991); Croatia (1945–1991); Bosnia and Herzegovina (1945–1992) Serbia (1945–1992) (included the autonomous provinces of Vojvodina and Kosovo) Montenegro (1945–1992); Macedonia (1945–1991) See also: Free Territory of Trieste (1947–1954)^{h}			Republic of Croatia^{b} Croatian War of Independence			
Slavonia	Part of Austria-Hungary including the Bay of Kotor See also: Kingdom of Croatia-Slavonia (1868–1918) Kingdom of Dalmatia (1815–1918) Condominium of Bosnia and Herzegovina (1878–1918)	State of Slovenes, Croats and Serbs (1918) Kingdom of Serbs, Croats and Slovenes (1918–1929) Kingdom of Yugoslavia (1929–1943) See also: Republic of Prekmurje (1919) Banat, Bačka and Baranja (1918–1919) Free State of Fiume (1920–1924) (1924–1945) Italian province of Zadar (1920–1947)		Independent State of Croatia (1941–1945) Puppet state of Germany. Parts annexed by Italy. Međimurje and Baranja annexed by Hungary.	Democratic Federal Yugoslavia (1943–1945) Federal People's Republic of Yugoslavia (1945–1963) Socialist Federal Republic of Yugoslavia (1963–1992) Consisted of the Socialist Republics of: Slovenia (1945–1991); Croatia (1945–1991); Bosnia and Herzegovina (1945–1992) Serbia (1945–1992) (included the autonomous provinces of Vojvodina and Kosovo) Montenegro (1945–1992); Macedonia (1945–1991) See also: Free Territory of Trieste (1947–1954)^{h}			Republic of Croatia^{b} Croatian War of Independence			
Croatia	Part of Austria-Hungary including the Bay of Kotor See also: Kingdom of Croatia-Slavonia (1868–1918) Kingdom of Dalmatia (1815–1918) Condominium of Bosnia and Herzegovina (1878–1918)	State of Slovenes, Croats and Serbs (1918) Kingdom of Serbs, Croats and Slovenes (1918–1929) Kingdom of Yugoslavia (1929–1943) See also: Republic of Prekmurje (1919) Banat, Bačka and Baranja (1918–1919) Free State of Fiume (1920–1924) (1924–1945) Italian province of Zadar (1920–1947)		Independent State of Croatia (1941–1945) Puppet state of Germany. Parts annexed by Italy. Međimurje and Baranja annexed by Hungary.	Democratic Federal Yugoslavia (1943–1945) Federal People's Republic of Yugoslavia (1945–1963) Socialist Federal Republic of Yugoslavia (1963–1992) Consisted of the Socialist Republics of: Slovenia (1945–1991); Croatia (1945–1991); Bosnia and Herzegovina (1945–1992) Serbia (1945–1992) (included the autonomous provinces of Vojvodina and Kosovo) Montenegro (1945–1992); Macedonia (1945–1991) See also: Free Territory of Trieste (1947–1954)^{h}			Republic of Croatia^{b} Croatian War of Independence			
Bosnia	Part of Austria-Hungary including the Bay of Kotor See also: Kingdom of Croatia-Slavonia (1868–1918) Kingdom of Dalmatia (1815–1918) Condominium of Bosnia and Herzegovina (1878–1918)	State of Slovenes, Croats and Serbs (1918) Kingdom of Serbs, Croats and Slovenes (1918–1929) Kingdom of Yugoslavia (1929–1943) See also: Republic of Prekmurje (1919) Banat, Bačka and Baranja (1918–1919) Free State of Fiume (1920–1924) (1924–1945) Italian province of Zadar (1920–1947)		Independent State of Croatia (1941–1945) Puppet state of Germany. Parts annexed by Italy. Međimurje and Baranja annexed by Hungary.	Democratic Federal Yugoslavia (1943–1945) Federal People's Republic of Yugoslavia (1945–1963) Socialist Federal Republic of Yugoslavia (1963–1992) Consisted of the Socialist Republics of: Slovenia (1945–1991); Croatia (1945–1991); Bosnia and Herzegovina (1945–1992) Serbia (1945–1992) (included the autonomous provinces of Vojvodina and Kosovo) Montenegro (1945–1992); Macedonia (1945–1991) See also: Free Territory of Trieste (1947–1954)^{h}			Bosnia and Herzegovina^{c} Bosnian War Consists of the Federation of Bosnia and Herzegovina (since 1995), Republika Srpska (since 1995), and Brčko District (since 2000).			
Herzegovina	Part of Austria-Hungary including the Bay of Kotor See also: Kingdom of Croatia-Slavonia (1868–1918) Kingdom of Dalmatia (1815–1918) Condominium of Bosnia and Herzegovina (1878–1918)	State of Slovenes, Croats and Serbs (1918) Kingdom of Serbs, Croats and Slovenes (1918–1929) Kingdom of Yugoslavia (1929–1943) See also: Republic of Prekmurje (1919) Banat, Bačka and Baranja (1918–1919) Free State of Fiume (1920–1924) (1924–1945) Italian province of Zadar (1920–1947)		Independent State of Croatia (1941–1945) Puppet state of Germany. Parts annexed by Italy. Međimurje and Baranja annexed by Hungary.	Democratic Federal Yugoslavia (1943–1945) Federal People's Republic of Yugoslavia (1945–1963) Socialist Federal Republic of Yugoslavia (1963–1992) Consisted of the Socialist Republics of: Slovenia (1945–1991); Croatia (1945–1991); Bosnia and Herzegovina (1945–1992) Serbia (1945–1992) (included the autonomous provinces of Vojvodina and Kosovo) Montenegro (1945–1992); Macedonia (1945–1991) See also: Free Territory of Trieste (1947–1954)^{h}			Bosnia and Herzegovina^{c} Bosnian War Consists of the Federation of Bosnia and Herzegovina (since 1995), Republika Srpska (since 1995), and Brčko District (since 2000).			
Vojvodina	Part of the Délvidék region of Hungary	State of Slovenes, Croats and Serbs (1918) Kingdom of Serbs, Croats and Slovenes (1918–1929) Kingdom of Yugoslavia (1929–1943) See also: Republic of Prekmurje (1919) Banat, Bačka and Baranja (1918–1919) Free State of Fiume (1920–1924) (1924–1945) Italian province of Zadar (1920–1947)		Autonomous Banat^{d} (part of the German; Territory of the Military Commander in Serbia)	Democratic Federal Yugoslavia (1943–1945) Federal People's Republic of Yugoslavia (1945–1963) Socialist Federal Republic of Yugoslavia (1963–1992) Consisted of the Socialist Republics of: Slovenia (1945–1991); Croatia (1945–1991); Bosnia and Herzegovina (1945–1992) Serbia (1945–1992) (included the autonomous provinces of Vojvodina and Kosovo) Montenegro (1945–1992); Macedonia (1945–1991) See also: Free Territory of Trieste (1947–1954)^{h}			Federal Republic of Yugoslavia Consisted of the Republic of Serbia (1992–2006) and Republic of Montenegro (1992–2006) Included Kosovo and Metohija, under UN administration, without control since 1999	State Union of Serbia and Montenegro Included Kosovo, under UN administration	Republic of Serbia Included the autonomous provinces of Vojvodina and Kosovo and Metohija under UN administration	Republic of Serbia Includes the autonomous province of Vojvodina; Kosovo claim
Central Serbia	Kingdom of Serbia (1882–1918)	State of Slovenes, Croats and Serbs (1918) Kingdom of Serbs, Croats and Slovenes (1918–1929) Kingdom of Yugoslavia (1929–1943) See also: Republic of Prekmurje (1919) Banat, Bačka and Baranja (1918–1919) Free State of Fiume (1920–1924) (1924–1945) Italian province of Zadar (1920–1947)		Territory of the Military Commander in Serbia (1941–1944) ^{e}	Democratic Federal Yugoslavia (1943–1945) Federal People's Republic of Yugoslavia (1945–1963) Socialist Federal Republic of Yugoslavia (1963–1992) Consisted of the Socialist Republics of: Slovenia (1945–1991); Croatia (1945–1991); Bosnia and Herzegovina (1945–1992) Serbia (1945–1992) (included the autonomous provinces of Vojvodina and Kosovo) Montenegro (1945–1992); Macedonia (1945–1991) See also: Free Territory of Trieste (1947–1954)^{h}			Federal Republic of Yugoslavia Consisted of the Republic of Serbia (1992–2006) and Republic of Montenegro (1992–2006) Included Kosovo and Metohija, under UN administration, without control since 1999	State Union of Serbia and Montenegro Included Kosovo, under UN administration	Republic of Serbia Included the autonomous provinces of Vojvodina and Kosovo and Metohija under UN administration	Republic of Serbia Includes the autonomous province of Vojvodina; Kosovo claim
Kosovo	Part of the Kingdom of Serbia (1912–1918)	State of Slovenes, Croats and Serbs (1918) Kingdom of Serbs, Croats and Slovenes (1918–1929) Kingdom of Yugoslavia (1929–1943) See also: Republic of Prekmurje (1919) Banat, Bačka and Baranja (1918–1919) Free State of Fiume (1920–1924) (1924–1945) Italian province of Zadar (1920–1947)		Mostly annexed by Italian Albania (1941–1944) along with western Macedonia and south-eastern Montenegro	Democratic Federal Yugoslavia (1943–1945) Federal People's Republic of Yugoslavia (1945–1963) Socialist Federal Republic of Yugoslavia (1963–1992) Consisted of the Socialist Republics of: Slovenia (1945–1991); Croatia (1945–1991); Bosnia and Herzegovina (1945–1992) Serbia (1945–1992) (included the autonomous provinces of Vojvodina and Kosovo) Montenegro (1945–1992); Macedonia (1945–1991) See also: Free Territory of Trieste (1947–1954)^{h}			Federal Republic of Yugoslavia Consisted of the Republic of Serbia (1992–2006) and Republic of Montenegro (1992–2006) Included Kosovo and Metohija, under UN administration, without control since 1999	State Union of Serbia and Montenegro Included Kosovo, under UN administration	Republic of Serbia Included the autonomous provinces of Vojvodina and Kosovo and Metohija under UN administration	Republic of Kosovo
Metohija	Kingdom of Montenegro (1910–1918) Metohija controlled by Austria-Hungary 1915–1918	State of Slovenes, Croats and Serbs (1918) Kingdom of Serbs, Croats and Slovenes (1918–1929) Kingdom of Yugoslavia (1929–1943) See also: Republic of Prekmurje (1919) Banat, Bačka and Baranja (1918–1919) Free State of Fiume (1920–1924) (1924–1945) Italian province of Zadar (1920–1947)		Mostly annexed by Italian Albania (1941–1944) along with western Macedonia and south-eastern Montenegro	Democratic Federal Yugoslavia (1943–1945) Federal People's Republic of Yugoslavia (1945–1963) Socialist Federal Republic of Yugoslavia (1963–1992) Consisted of the Socialist Republics of: Slovenia (1945–1991); Croatia (1945–1991); Bosnia and Herzegovina (1945–1992) Serbia (1945–1992) (included the autonomous provinces of Vojvodina and Kosovo) Montenegro (1945–1992); Macedonia (1945–1991) See also: Free Territory of Trieste (1947–1954)^{h}			Federal Republic of Yugoslavia Consisted of the Republic of Serbia (1992–2006) and Republic of Montenegro (1992–2006) Included Kosovo and Metohija, under UN administration, without control since 1999	State Union of Serbia and Montenegro Included Kosovo, under UN administration	Republic of Serbia Included the autonomous provinces of Vojvodina and Kosovo and Metohija under UN administration	Republic of Kosovo
Montenegro and Brda	Kingdom of Montenegro (1910–1918) Metohija controlled by Austria-Hungary 1915–1918	State of Slovenes, Croats and Serbs (1918) Kingdom of Serbs, Croats and Slovenes (1918–1929) Kingdom of Yugoslavia (1929–1943) See also: Republic of Prekmurje (1919) Banat, Bačka and Baranja (1918–1919) Free State of Fiume (1920–1924) (1924–1945) Italian province of Zadar (1920–1947)		Protectorate of Montenegro^{f} (1941–1944)	Democratic Federal Yugoslavia (1943–1945) Federal People's Republic of Yugoslavia (1945–1963) Socialist Federal Republic of Yugoslavia (1963–1992) Consisted of the Socialist Republics of: Slovenia (1945–1991); Croatia (1945–1991); Bosnia and Herzegovina (1945–1992) Serbia (1945–1992) (included the autonomous provinces of Vojvodina and Kosovo) Montenegro (1945–1992); Macedonia (1945–1991) See also: Free Territory of Trieste (1947–1954)^{h}			Federal Republic of Yugoslavia Consisted of the Republic of Serbia (1992–2006) and Republic of Montenegro (1992–2006) Included Kosovo and Metohija, under UN administration, without control since 1999	State Union of Serbia and Montenegro Included Kosovo, under UN administration	Montenegro	
Vardar Macedonia	Part of the Kingdom of Serbia (1912–1918)	State of Slovenes, Croats and Serbs (1918) Kingdom of Serbs, Croats and Slovenes (1918–1929) Kingdom of Yugoslavia (1929–1943) See also: Republic of Prekmurje (1919) Banat, Bačka and Baranja (1918–1919) Free State of Fiume (1920–1924) (1924–1945) Italian province of Zadar (1920–1947)		Annexed by the Kingdom of Bulgaria (1941–1944)	Democratic Federal Yugoslavia (1943–1945) Federal People's Republic of Yugoslavia (1945–1963) Socialist Federal Republic of Yugoslavia (1963–1992) Consisted of the Socialist Republics of: Slovenia (1945–1991); Croatia (1945–1991); Bosnia and Herzegovina (1945–1992) Serbia (1945–1992) (included the autonomous provinces of Vojvodina and Kosovo) Montenegro (1945–1992); Macedonia (1945–1991) See also: Free Territory of Trieste (1947–1954)^{h}			Republic of North Macedonia^{g}			
^{a} Prekmurje annexed by Hungary.; ^{b} See also: SAO Kninska Krajina (1990) → SAO Krajina (1990–1991); and SAO Eastern Slavonia, Baranja and Western Syrmia (1990–1991), SAO Western Slavonia (1990–1991) and the Republic of Serbian Krajina (1990–1995), all replaced by the UN Transitional Administration for Eastern Slavonia, Baranja and Western Sirmium (1996–1998).; ^{c} See also: Republic of Bosnia and Herzegovina; Croatian Republic of Herzeg-Bosnia; and the Serbian Autonomous Oblasts (SAOs) of Bosanska Krajina, North-East Bosnia, Romanija and Herzegovina (1991–1992), which all combined to form the Serbian Republic of Bosnia and Herzegovina (1992–1995).; ^{d} Bačka was reannexed by Hungary (1941–1944), while Syrmia was annexed by the Independent State of Croatia (1941–1944).; ^{e} Including North Kosovo. See also: Republic of Užice.; ^{f} Annexed by Italy (1941–1943) and Germany (1943–1944). Smaller part annexed by the Independent State of Croatia (1941–1944).; ^{g} North Macedonia's official and constitutional name was the Republic of Macedonia until 2019. It was known in the United Nations as the former Yugoslav Republic of Macedonia because of a naming dispute with Greece.; ^{h} Free Territory was established in 1947. Its administration was divided into two areas (Zone A) and (Zone B). Free Territory was de facto taken over by Italy and SFRY in 1954.
