= Root (disambiguation) =

A root is the part of a plant, generally underground, that anchors the plant body, and absorbs and stores water and nutrients.

Root or roots may also refer to:

== Art, entertainment, and media ==
- The Root (magazine), an online magazine focusing on African-American culture
- The Roots, a location in the video game Kya: Dark Lineage

=== Films ===
- Roots (film) (Spanish: Raíces), a 1955 Mexican drama
- Poor Relatives, also released as Roots, a 2005 Russian film
- Roots, the English title for the 2019 Tamil film Sethum Aayiram Pon

=== Literature and stage plays ===
- Koreni (novel) (English: The Roots), a 1954 novel by Serbian author Dobrica Ćosić
- Roots (play), a 1958 play by Arnold Wesker
- Roots: The Saga of an American Family, a 1976 novel by Alex Haley about slavery in the United States

=== Music ===
- Root (chord), the fundamental note of a chord
- Roots music (disambiguation)

==== Groups and individuals ====
- Root (band), a Czech metal band
- Root (singer), a Japanese singer
- Root!, an Australian alt-country band
- The Roots, a hip-hop group from Philadelphia, Pennsylvania

==== Albums and EPs ====
- Roots (Idrees Sulieman album), 1958
- Roots (The Everly Brothers album), 1968
- Roots (Curtis Mayfield album), 1971
- Roots: John Lennon Sings the Great Rock & Roll Hits, 1975
- Roots (Slide Hampton album), 1985
- Roots (Sepultura album), 1996
- Roots (Cedar Walton album), 1997
- Root, a 1999 album by Thurston Moore
- Roots (Blue Mountain album), 2001
- Roots (Shawn McDonald album), 2008
- R.O.O.T.S., a 2009 album by Flo Rida
- Roots (Johnny Winter album), 2011
- Roots (EP), 2013, by Orla Gartland
- Roots (The Cavemen album), 2020
- Roots, an album by Martin Fröst

==== Songs ====
- "Root", a song by Deftones on the 1995 album Adrenaline
- "The Root", a song by D'Angelo, on the 2000 album Voodoo
- "Roots", by the band Spunge on their 2002 album The Story So Far
- "Roots", a song on the 2006 Show of Hands album Witness
- "Roots" (song), a song by Imagine Dragons
- "Roots", a 2016 song by the band Parmalee
- "Roots", by the band In This Moment on their 2017 album Ritual
- "Roots (World Junior Song)", a 2018 by The Reklaws
- "Roots", a 2019 song by Galantis and Valerie Broussard
- "R.O.O.T.S.", a 2009 song by Flo Rida

=== Television ===
- Roots (1977 miniseries), based upon the Alex Haley novel
- Roots (2016 miniseries), remake of the 1977 miniseries
- .hack//Roots, a 2006 anime series created by Bee Train
- "The Roots" (The Amazing World of Gumball), a 2016 episode
- "Roots" (Doctors), a 2003 episode
- "Roots" (Get a Life), a 1991 episode
- "Roots" (Haven), a 2011 episode
- "Roots" (One Day at a Time) a 2018 episode

== Businesses ==
- Root, Inc., an American insurance company
- Roots Canada, a clothing brand with stores worldwide
- Roots (restaurant), a Michelin starred restaurant in York, in England
- Roots Blower Company, an n American engineering founded by Philander and Francis Roots

== Computing ==
- /root, the Unix superuser's home directory in the Filesystem Hierarchy Standard
- ROOT, an object-oriented multipurpose data analysis package developed by CERN
- root, a name for the superuser account in some operating systems
- Root directory, the first or top-most directory in a hierarchy
- Root node, the node in a tree data structure from which every other node is accessible
- ROOTS (software), a series of genealogy programs

== Mathematics ==
- nth root of a number
  - Root of unity, a complex number which is an nth root of one
- Root of an equation, a solution of the equation
- Root of a function, more meaningfully called zero of a function, an argument for which the function evaluates to zero
- Digital root, the sum of a number's digits
- Any of the elements of a root system of vectors
- One designated vertex of a rooted tree in graph theory
- The root or base of a number system

== NGOs ==
- Roots – Judur – Shorashim, a peace organization for Palestinians and Israelis

== People ==
- Root (surname), a family name
- Roots Manuva (born 1972), British rapper
- Rutaba Yaqub, Saudi Arabian singer, also known as "Roots"
- Root, Japanese singer from Strawberry prince
- Elmar Roots (1900–1962), Estonian veterinarian
- Byron Root Pierce (1829–1924), American dentist and American Civil War veteran

== Places ==
- Root, Switzerland, a municipality in the district of Lucerne
- Root River (disambiguation)

=== United States ===
- Roots, Michigan, an unincorporated community in Henrietta Township, Jackson County
- Root, New York, a town in Montgomery County
- Roots, Pennsylvania, a census-designated place in Blair County
- Root Township, Adams County, Indiana

== Other uses ==
- Root (board game), a game published by Leder Games
- Root (Chinese constellation)
- Root (linguistics), the core form of a word
- Root (robot), an educational robot
- Roots, one's cultural heritage
- Root, Australasian slang for sexual intercourse
- Roots Blower, a type of supercharger invented by Philander and Francis Roots

== See also ==
- Root of all evil (disambiguation)
- Root cause (disambiguation)
- Rooter (disambiguation)
- Rootes (disambiguation)
- Rooting (disambiguation)
- Radix (disambiguation)
- Rut (disambiguation)
- Solution (disambiguation)
