= Roots (surname) =

Roots is a surname, and may refer to:

- Alex Roots (born 1992), British singer
- Betty Ida Roots (1927–2020), British zoologist
- Elmar Roots (1900–1962), Estonian veterinarian
- Ethan Roots (born 1997), New Zealand rugby union player
- Fred Roots (1923–2016), Canadian geologist and explorer
- Ivan Roots (1921–2015), British historian
- Jimmy Roots (born 2000), New Zealand rugby union player
- Levi Roots (born 1958), Jamaican-British businessman and celebrity chef
- Logan H. Roots (1841–1893), American politician
- Olav Roots (1910–1974), Estonian conductor, pianist and composer
- Stefan Roots, American politician
- William Roots (1911–1971), British politician

== See also ==
- Rootes (surname)
- Root (surname)
