= Root (surname) =

Root is a surname, and may refer to:

== People ==
- Alan Root (1937–2017), Anglo-Kenyan wildlife filmmaker
- Amanda Root (born 1963), British actress
- Amos Root (1839–1923), American beekeeper
- Antony Root (born 1954), British scriptwriter and drama producer
- Bill Root (ice hockey) (born 1959), Canadian ice-hockey player
- Bill Root (bridge) (1923–2002), American bridge player
- Billy Root (cricketer) (born 1992), English cricketer
- Budd Root (born 1958), American comic book artist
- Charles W. Root (1899-1968), American lawyer and politician
- Charlie Root (1899–1970), American baseball player
- Edmund Root (1881–1961), American naval officer
- Ednah Root (1907–1987), American painter, philanthropist
- Edward Root (1902–1986), Australian rugby league footballer
- Eleazer Root (1802–1887), American educator and Episcopalian priest
- Elias Root (1806–1880), New York businessman and politician
- Elihu Root (1845–1937), American statesman and 1912 recipient of the Nobel Peace Prize
- Elisha K. Root (1808–1865), American inventor
- Erastus Root (1773–1846), US congressman from, and lieutenant governor of, New York
- Fred Root (1890–1954), English cricketer
- Frederic Woodman Root (1846-1916), American composer
- George Frederick Root (1820–1895), American songwriter
- Gladys Root (1905–1982), American criminal defense attorney
- Gloria Root (1948–2006), American model
- Grace W. Root (1869-1898), American actress and composer
- Howard Root (1926–2007), American-born British Anglican priest and theologian
- Jack Root (1873-1963), professional name of American light heavyweight boxing champion Janos Ruthuly
- Jacob Root (died 1861), American politician from Maryland
- Jane Root (born 1957), British television executive
- Jesse Root (1736–1822), Chief Justice of the Connecticut Supreme Court
- Jesse L. Root (1860–1947), Associate Justice of the Nebraska Supreme Court
- Jim Root (born 1971), American guitarist
- Jim Root (gridiron football) (1931–2003), American football player and coach
- Joan Root (1936–2006), British (Kenyan-born) ecological activist and Oscar-nominated filmmaker
- Joe Root (born 1990), English cricketer
- Joe Root (hermit) (1860–1912) American hermit from Erie, Pennsylvania
- Joel Root (1770–1847), American author of a journal of his voyage around the world (1802–1806) on a sealing ship
- John B. Root (born 1958), French pornographic filmmaker
- Joseph Pomeroy Root (1826–1885), American doctor, politician, and diplomat
- John Wellborn Root (1850–1891), American architect
- John Wellborn Root Jr. (1887–1963), American architect
- Jon Root (born 1964), American volleyball player
- Leon Root (1929–2015), American physician
- Martha Root (1872–1939), American teacher of the Bahá'í Faith
- Milo A. Root (1863–1917), justice of the Washington Supreme Court
- Olga von Root (1901–1967), Russian stage actress and singer
- Pauline Root (1859–1944), American physician and missionary
- Rebecca Root, English actress
- Richard B. Root (1936–2013), American ecologist, entomologist and evolutionary biologist
- Richard K. Root (1938–2006), American epidemiologist
- Robert Root-Bernstein (born 1953), MacArthur fellow and professor of life sciences at Michigan State University
- Sidney Root (1824–1897), American engineer and businessman
- Stephen Root (born 1951), American actor
- Tina Root (born 1968), American singer
- Tom Root (born 1973), American Emmy-winning TV writer and producer
- Waverley Root (1903–1982), American journalist
- Wilbur M. Root (1842–1916), American politician
- William Lucas Root (1919–2007), American information theorist
- William Pitt Root (born 1941), American poet
- Zachary Root (born 2004), American baseball player

== Fictional characters ==
- Enoch Root, fictional character in The Baroque Cycle novels by Neal Stephenson
- Hugo Root, fictional character in the comic book series Preacher

== See also ==
- Root (disambiguation)
- Rootes (disambiguation)
- Roth (surname)
