= Radix (disambiguation) =

A radix, or base, is the number of unique digits, including zero, used to represent numbers in a positional numeral system.

Radix may also refer to:

== Mathematics and science ==
- Radix (gastropod), a genus of freshwater snails
- Radical symbol (√), used to indicate a root
- Root (Latin: radix), in biology

== Computing ==
- Radix point, a symbol used in mathematics to separate the integral part of the number from its fractional part
- Radix sort, a computer sorting algorithm
- Radix tree, a type of set data structure
- DEC Radix-50, a character encoding
- Radix-64, a character encoding

== Entertainment ==
- Radix Ace Entertainment, a Japanese Animation studio
- Radix Tetrad, a science fiction novel series by A. A. Attanasio
  - Radix (novel), the first novel, published in 1981
- Radix: Beyond the Void, a 1995 first-person shooter video game

== Other ==
- Radix (company), a domain registry operator
- Radix Trading, an American proprietary trading firm
- Radix Journal, an online white-supremacist periodical published by the National Policy Institute

== See also ==
- Base (disambiguation)
- Root (disambiguation)
