= Koreni =

Koreni may refer to:

- Koreni (settlement), in Kenya's Coast Province
- Koreni (novel), by Serbian author Dobrica Cosic published in 1954
