= EniObanke Music Festival =

Music festival

EMUfest
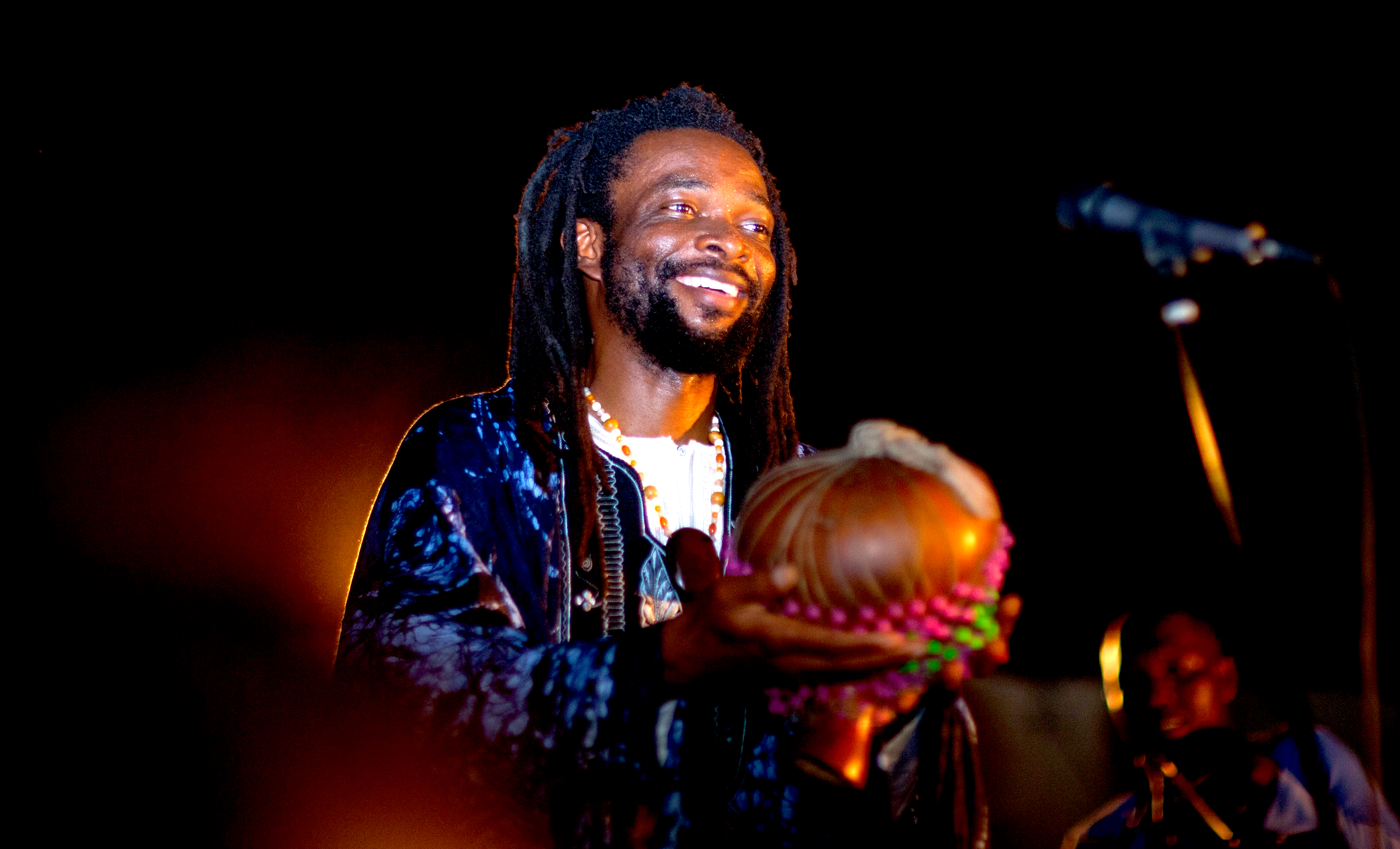
- Beautiful Nubia performing at EMUfest 2012 in Lagos.
- Genre: Folk; Roots; Neo-traditional; Afrobeat; Choirs; Highlife; Poetry; Orchestral
- Locations: EniObanke Arts Centre, Nigeria
- Years active: 2010–present
- Founder: Dr. Segun Akinlolu (Beautiful Nubia)
- Website: eniobanke.com

The EniObanke Music Festival (EMUfest) is a modest, multi-city festival of music which holds annually in Nigeria. It was established in 2010 by folk and roots musician, Beautiful Nubia (Dr. Segun Akinlolu) and primarily designed as a platform for the discovery of new and emerging talent and the celebration of established names. While the main focus of the festival is music - mainly traditional folk, contemporary folk, folk-fusion, and folk-derived pop - it has also featured poetry, dance, drama and the visual arts.

A typical EMUfest includes a talent night featuring new artists, a football game with musicians and fans, free music classes, and concerts. Since 2010, over 300 individuals, choirs and bands have played at EMUfest, including Chris Ajilo, Orlando Julius Ekemode, Jimi Solanke, Yinka Davies, and Lagbaja.

EMUfest is the longest-running recurring music event organised by any musician in Nigeria in recent years.
