= Dimitris Dekavallas =

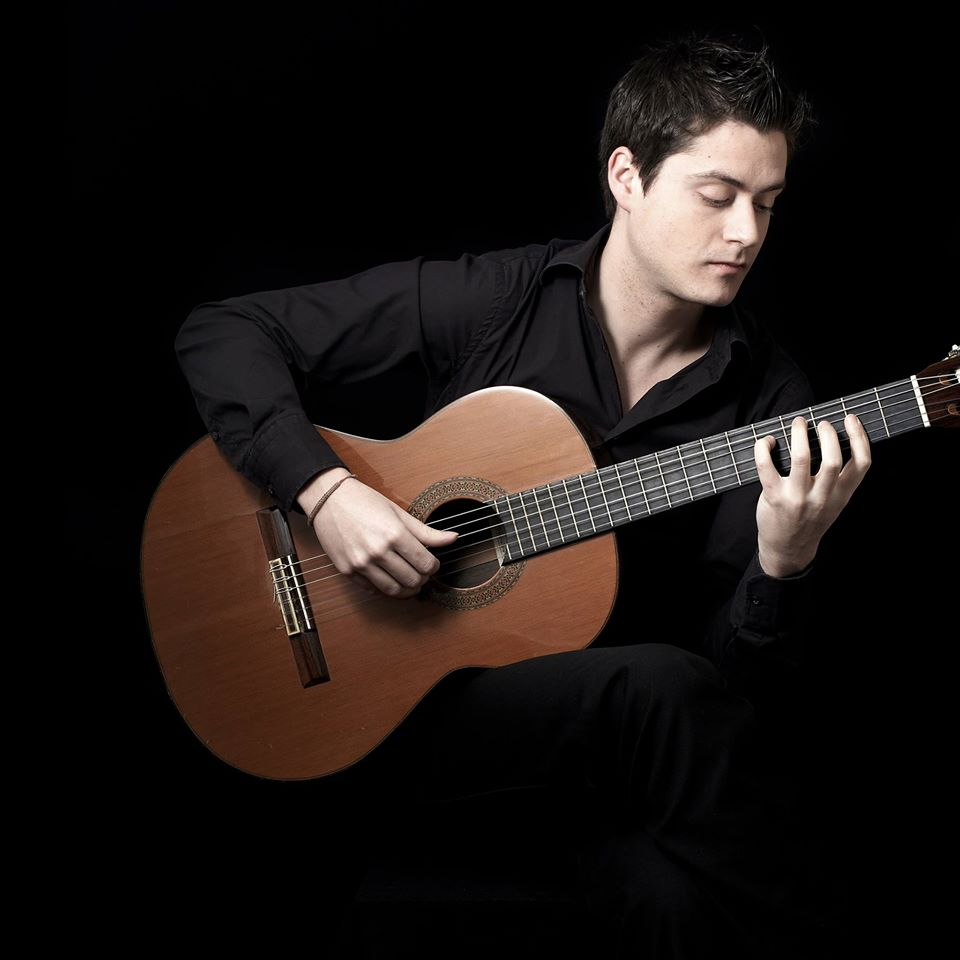

Background information
- Born: 19 September 1982 (age 43) Athens, Greece
- Genres: Classical Music, Tango, Bossa Nova, Contemporary Music
- Occupation: Guitarist
- Instrument: Guitar
- Website: www.dimitrisdekavallas.com

Dimitris Dekavallas is a Greek award-winning classical guitarist, currently residing in London, England. He began performing live at the age of nine and has won multiple awards including the Ivor Mairants Award. He has collaborated on a total of four albums and toured internationally.

== Early life and education ==
Dekavallas started studying classical guitar at the age of five in Athens, Greece, having his first stage and competition performances at the age of nine. Between 1994 and 2000, he studied at the Hellenic Conservatory of music under Angelos Nikolopoulos. In 2004 he won the IKY National Competition Scholarship, the Royal Academy of Music's Scholarship and the Tebutt Exhibition Award which enabled him to study at the Royal Academy of Music, under Michael Lewin, David Russell, Timothy Walker, John Mills, and John Williams. Whilst there, Dekavallas also won the First Prize at the prestigious Ivor Mairants guitar award Award by the Worshipful Company of Musicians. He graduated from the Royal Academy of Music, London in 2007 with First Class Honours.

== Career ==
Dekavallas has toured internationally, performing in venues that include the Wigmore Hall, the Southbank Centre and the Royal Albert Hall. He has appeared as soloist in several performances of guitar concertos with Symphony Orchestras in the UK, Germany and Romania. Besides his career in solo performance, Dekavallas is also a proponent of chamber music, and is the co-founder of chamber ensemble Duo Diez, a Guitar and Violin Duo, alongside Spanish Violinist Violeta Barrena. He has also performed a private recital for Pope Benedict XVI and the Archbishop of Canterbury.

Several composers have dedicated compositions to Dimitris such as Nikita Koshkin (Sonata II), Julian Jacobson (FanTango) and Hayley Savage (The cell).

Dekavallas has collaborated for four album releases, including 'Music for Oboe and Guitar', 'Simply Spanish Moods' (for Union Square Music), 'Gipsy Spirit', and 'Premiere' including two world premieres. He is sponsored by D’Addario Guitar Strings and has given several masterclasses internationally.

== Discography ==
Title	Details
Music for Oboe and Guitar	Released: 2009; Label: Mariaki Music; Format: CD
Simply Spanish Moods	Released: 2010; Label: Union Square Music; Format: CD
Gipsy Spirit	Released: 2010; Label: Format: CD
Premiere	Released: 2012; Label: Format: CD
