= The Last Legends of Earth =

1989 novel by A. A. Attanasio

- First edition
- Author: A. A. Attanasio
- Cover artist: Shusei Nagaoka
- Language: English
- Series: Radix Tetrad
- Genre: Science fiction novel
- Publisher: Bantam / Spectra
- Publication date: 1989
- Publication place: United States
- Media type: Print (hardback & paperback)
- Pages: 450
- ISBN: 0-553-28601-3
- OCLC: 22297197
- Preceded by: Arc of the Dream

The Last Legends of Earth is a 1989 science fiction novel by A. A. Attanasio, the fourth and final novel in his Radix Tetrad series. It contains the continuing story of the conflict between the humans, zōtl, Rimstalkers, other spatial dimensions, and time-travel/temporal distortion as do other novels in the tetrad, though this novel is set in events before In Other Worlds.

The book has been republished by Phoenix Pick, an imprint of Arc Manor Publishers.

== Overview ==
The novel itself is a study of time and space. It features a large cast of primary and secondary characters who inhabit the various ages and major characters who inhabit the entire novel's timespan. Events of the story occur on a 15-planet star system just outside the Milky Way Galaxy and time corridors outside normal time called the "Overworld".

The primary character is a young female Rimstalker named Gai. She is assigned as the Mission Commander to lure the zōtl spiderfolk with intelligent life as food and also to find an artifact (the O'ode) in order to kill the zōtl. Ultimately, humanity is brought back from the dead as bait for the zōtl. Gai and the few soldiers who are left after the zōtl attack on the Rimstalker's world have been sent out to create artificial star systems and re-created intelligent lifeforms found in the dust of intergalactic space in order to lure zōtl.

The Rimstalkers live on a world that is just outside a black hole that created the universe, the edge of spacetime itself. Thus meaning of Gai's people's name, the "Rimstalker", those who are living on rim of creation.

This ribbon-shaped world is being devastated by the zotl, spider-like beings who feed on the pain of intelligent beings. Originally, the zōtl were unaware of the Rimstalkers, but once the zōtl were informed of the Rimstalker's existence, they immediately attacked populated areas in order to remove further resistance.

Time in Gai's world, the Range, is distorted. Seven thousand years in real-time is a weekend in their world. The world is smaller than atom and its gravity is incredibly high. This gravity is nothing to the inhabitants. Even though in spacetime (The void) where Gai was sent is faster than hers, time is running out for her people. The zōtl are devastating her world, so Gai is driven to move quickly.

Piloting a special ship that can transverse the gravity well from the range to outer space where energy is easier to create, Gai sets and baits the 'trap'.

She has only 7 thousand years of real time in which to find the zōtl's nest world before her ship has generated enough power to return home.

The book is divided up by "Age", in which notable events accrue. Gai discovers a human which has been flung back from a distant time "Age" in which she is victorious. After aiding this human to try to find his lost love, She decides to track him and follow him to ensure that her future is same as the one he came from.

The story builds on multiple short stories of people and events that occur in these various time periods. The stories are linked together as being significant events in Chalco-Doror's history. This is also a race to retrieve the zōtl killing artifact, the O'ode and stop one man who comes from the future where it all happens. The only means to find the O'ode is try to explore corridors of time in the "Overworld". This effort takes time and a fantastic amount of power and courage in order to find this artifact.

== Major characters ==
Gai
Mission Commander of Genitrix (the Ship), young Rimstalker warrior who is willing to give up her life to avenge her family and save her people from extinction, whatever the cost.

Genitrix
The chief Machine Intelligence "AI" of Gai's ship and the heart and soul of their mission. Designed to search, create, and re-create dead lifeforms to lure zōtl to their ship and search for the O'ode artifact through weaves of time. She is programmed with a poetic mind, to help her to be more flexible and creative.

Lod
Machine Intelligence "AI" built to regulate the Chalco-Doror (Genitrix)'s engines & gravitational generators. He is an honorable individual who is dedicated to fulfilling Gai's mission. When he projects his mind in physical form, he appears to be a human-shape made of fiery gold. He is also charged with monitoring his "brother" Saor. His "body" is used as the Sun of the artificial solar system Chalco-Doror. After experiencing what the zōtl had done to a human that he failed to save, Lod has become fearful of being exposed to the zōtl.

Saor
Machine Intelligence "AI" built to monitor and gather information. He is built into the nose cone/antenna/communication section of Genitrix/Chalco-Doror. His physical body became a miniature black hole when ship transformed into a solar system. He was taken over by a zōtl virus and used against Gai. He was antisocial member of Genitrix prior to his personality being re-programmed by the zōtl on "saving" Chalco-Doror from being destroyed. He believes himself a hero to the beings whom live in Chalco-Doror. He is used by the zōtl at every turn to fight the Rimstalker, Gai, whom he believes is evil.

Ned O'Tennis
A human born during the "Age of Dominion", or the Fourth Age. He is from a technologically advanced, Viking-descended warrior race known as the Aesirai. He himself is poetic and dislikes how his race of people are using and abusing other human races. He falls in love with Chan-ti Beppu, a young woman from a wandering tribe-people called the "Foke." They become separated when his honor forces him to defend N'ym, the capital of the Aesirai, from rebel forces—only for him to be thrown far back in time and deep into the Overworld after falling through an ancient lynk. Despite the centuries now separating them, Ned is determined to reunite with Chan-ti. He later becomes a time compass for Gai to use, in order for her to find the future timeline in which she is victorious.

Chan-ti Beppu
A Foke tribe woman who falls in love with gentle warrior Ned O'Tennis. She initially seeks him out after interpreting a section within the Glyph Astra as a prophecy fating her to fall in love with the gentle warrior. When he is flung back in time, she (along with two other volunteers) begin a journey through time to rescue the time lost warrior she loves so desperately.

== Notes ==
The character Reena Patai is featured in a previous Tetrad novel Arc of the Dream. She crosses through a time-portal and becomes a notable character in this novel. She is the alleged author of the Glyph Astra, a book that serves as both a survival guide and spiritual manual to the worlds and their future.
