= Hudelist =

Hudelist is a surname. Notable people with the surname include:

- Darko Hudelist (born 1959), Croatian journalist and history writer
- Josef von Hudelist (1759–1818), Austrian diplomat and statesman
- Herlinde Pissarek-Hudelist (1932–1994), Austrian theologian and university teacher
