= Chris Ajilo =

Nigerian musician (1929–2021)

Christopher Isola Ajilo (26 December 1929 – 20 February 2021) was a Nigerian musician and record producer whose band Chris Ajilo and His Cubanos released Ariwo and Eko O Gba Gbere.

== Life ==
Ajilo's father was from Ijebu-Ijesha but Ajilo grew up in Lagos Island along with four other siblings including Cornie Ajilo, who was also in the music industry, another sibling, a brother was a member of the West African Frontier Force. He attended C.M.S. Grammar School but life in Lagos was tough, his father died when he was young and Ajilo had to grow up quickly to find a way to earn a living. He decided to travel abroad, and to begin his journey, he became a stowaway and found his way to England where he studied music at the Eric Gilder School of Music. In England, he took up playing the tenor saxophone and joined a jazz infused Afro-Cuban music playing band and played gigs with the bands of Kenny Graham and Ginger Johnson. Upon completing studies at Central School of Dance Music, Ajilo returned to Nigeria and joined the West End Cool Cats Orchestra before forming his band, Chris Ajilo and the Cubanos. A touring band, the group played in various locations in Nigeria and West Africa. The band released Ariwo and later Eko O Gba Gbere. In 1960, he was band leader of the national orchestra for Nigeria's independence ball.

Ajilo was once the band leader at Premier and Lafia hotels in Ibadan and Federal Palance Hotel, Lagos and the NBC Dance Orchestra, Lagos.

Ajilo's career was heavy in music production and instruction. In the 1970s, Ajilo was an in house producer for Polygram and later Premier Records where he worked with artists like Osita Osadebe. He was a music producer in one of Art Alade's television shows. He also taught music at the International School, Ibadan.

"Ariwo", Chris Ajilo's first album in over 50 years (comprising 11 tracks) was produced by Beautiful Nubia and released on his EniObanke label in 2012.

== Death ==
He died at a hospital in Ilesa, Osun State, on 20 February 2021.
