= Rooter =

Rooter or Rooters may refer to:

- Rooter: A Methodology for the Typical Unification of Access Points and Redundancy, a nonsense computer science research paper
- Rooter (Ender's Game), a fictional character
- Royal Rooters, fan club for the Boston Americans
- Cumberland Rooters, minor league baseball club in the Western Pennsylvania League
- Rooter, a fictional dinosaur character in the 1988 animated film: The Land Before Time

== See also ==
- Rooster (disambiguation)
- Root (disambiguation)
- Rooting (disambiguation)
