= Rootes =

Rootes may refer to:

== People ==
- Rootes (surname)
- Baron Rootes, peerage in the United Kingdom

== Companies ==
- Rootes Group, British car and commercial vehicle manufacturer founded by William Edward Rootes
  - Rootes Arrow, a badge engineered range of cars produced by the Rootes Group
  - Rootes Australia, Australian assembler of Rootes Group vehicles
  - Rootes Aircraft Factory, located at RAF Speke during the Second World War

== See also ==
- Root (disambiguation)
