= Eric Gilder =

British musician and teacher (1911–2000)

Eric Gilder (25 December 1911 – 1 June 2000) was an English teacher, conductor, composer and pianist. He was best known as the principal of the Eric Gilder School of Music.

== Education ==
Gilder was a pupil at Henry Thornton School in Clapham from 1926 until 1931, and composed the original school song. He initially studied mathematics and physics, but in 1936 he gained a scholarship to the Royal College of Music where he studied under John Ireland, Ralph Vaughan Williams, Constant Lambert and Sir Malcolm Sargent. He continued there until interrupted by war service.

== School of music ==
After World War II, Gilder worked variously as a pianist, conductor, broadcaster, and as principal of his own school of music. He began his career as a teacher at the Central School of Dance Music at 15 West Street in London. This was originally established in 1950 by jazz guitarist Ivor Mairants, primarily for jazz, big band and popular music players. Mairants handed the school over to Gilder in 1960 and it became the Eric Gilder School of Music. By then its address was 195 Wardour Street in Soho (original building has been demolished). Among the teaching staff at the school were Johnny Dankworth, Jack Brymer, Kenny Baker, Bert Weedon and Ike Isaacs, as well as Gilder himself.

Gilder is remembered with gratitude by the poet and musician Labi Siffre in his poem "education education education". Siffre studied at the Gilder school, as did Richard Wright of Pink Floyd, Junior Campbell, David Essex, Christine McVie, John Chilton and (as a part-time student in the spring of 1963) the 15 year-old Andrew Lloyd Webber. The school attracted notable expatriate musicians from Africa and the Caribbean including Chris Ajilo, Ebo Taylor, (the Ghanaian afrobeat guitarist, composer and bandleader), Mulatu Astatke (considered the father of Ethio-jazz) and Teddy Osei (founder member of Osibisa, a band that played a central role in developing a more international awareness of African music in the 1970s).

== Conductor and composer ==
As a conductor, Gilder was an active choral director and arranger. In April 1951, he was appointed musical director of the 50-strong Ilford Girls' Choir and secured some high-profile bookings for them, including a live broadcast of Variety Bandbox on the BBC Light Programme, accompanying the young Julie Andrews. However, something went wrong and he resigned from the post in April 1952. He also arranged choral parts for Geraldo and his Orchestra (as chorus master of "the Geraldo Glee Club") and appeared at the Royal Festival Hall in London as a conductor and pianist.

As a composer, Gilder wrote orchestral, choral, theatre, and television music, pantomime music and lyrics, collaborating with the actor and writer John Crocker (1925–2015), as well as 200 songs (some with salon orchestra parts) and numerous solo piano pieces. Gilder also wrote plays, poetry, and fiction, and contributed to music periodicals.

== Personal life ==
Gilder was married (on 23 December 1939) with two daughters, and lived in his later years at 21 Fieldend, Twickenham.

== Selected works ==
=== Music ===
- Seascape for piano and orchestra (1939)
- The Tide for soprano, baritone, chorus, organ, and orchestra (1945)
- Christmas Sounds for soli, chorus, and orchestra (1950)
- A Busy Song: three-part song for soprano, mezzo, and alto with piano (words and music by Gilder) (published Curwen, 1951)
- Gavotte for piano (published Noel Gay Music, 1951)
- Hear Our Music, choir and piano (published Manor Music Co, 1951)
- I Will Wait, song (words and music by Gilder) (published Manor Music Co, 1951)
- Nursery Suite for orchestra (1953)
- A Sea Suite for orchestra (1954)
- La Contadina (The Little Match Girl), soli and light orchestra (published Ricordi, 1954)
- Three Gifts, soli and light orchestra (words and music by Gilder) (published, Ricordi, 1954)
- A Processional Overture (1975)
- Sonata for Violin and Piano (1979)
- Three Pastorals for orchestra (1981)
- Danse Fantastique, piano duet
- Many pantomime scores and lyrics in collaboration with John Crocker, still in use, including Aladdin, Puss in Boots and Red Riding Hood (1960s)

=== Author ===
- Troubled Waters (radio play, broadcast 17 July 1946, BBC Home Service)
- Mister Potter's Play (radio play, broadcast 15 May 1948, BBC Home Service)
- Dictionary of Composers and Their Music (with June G Port, 1978)
- The Back Stairs, short story (broadcast 18 June 1980)
