= The Dark Shore =

- Author: A. A. Attanasio
- Language: English
- Publisher: Hodder & Stoughton
- Publication date: 1996

The Dark Shore is a 1996 novel written by A. A. Attanasio.

== Plot summary ==
The Dark Shore is a novel in which a Dark Lord returns to the world of Irth with reptilian cacodemons, determined—again—to conquer it. A powerful mage on the brink of transcendence, poised to merge with Creation after amassing vast magical Charm. The mage perceives time in layered simultaneity—viewing a building in its full temporal arc, from pristine plain to decaying ruin. Ultimately, the mage forgoes cosmic unity to battle the Dark Lord.

== Reception ==
Gideon Kibblewhite reviewed The Dark Shore for Arcane magazine, rating it a 4 out of 10 overall, and stated that "It would be refreshing, wouldn’t it, if for once a Dark Lord came along who not only crushed and enslaved the locals, but made sure they stayed crushed and enslaved. No wonder William Hill has stopped taking bets on Dark Lords winding up on the losing side; give anyone a cloak and a few slaves and they start foolishly underestimating their enemies. It's a mug's game backing the baddies, but at least this one dishes out some admirably sick and depraved suffering before receiving the traditional hiding."

== Reviews ==
- Review by Chris Gilmore (1996) in Interzone, September 1996
- Review by Steve Jeffery (1996) in Vector 189
- Review by Faren Miller (1996) in Locus, #431 December 1996
- Review by Chris Amies (1997) in Vector 194
- Review by Jon Wallace (1954 -) (1998) in Vector 200
- Review by Robert Francis (1998) in SF Site, Mid-April 1998, (1998)
- Kirkus
