= Beautiful Nubia =

Nigerian musician (1997–present)

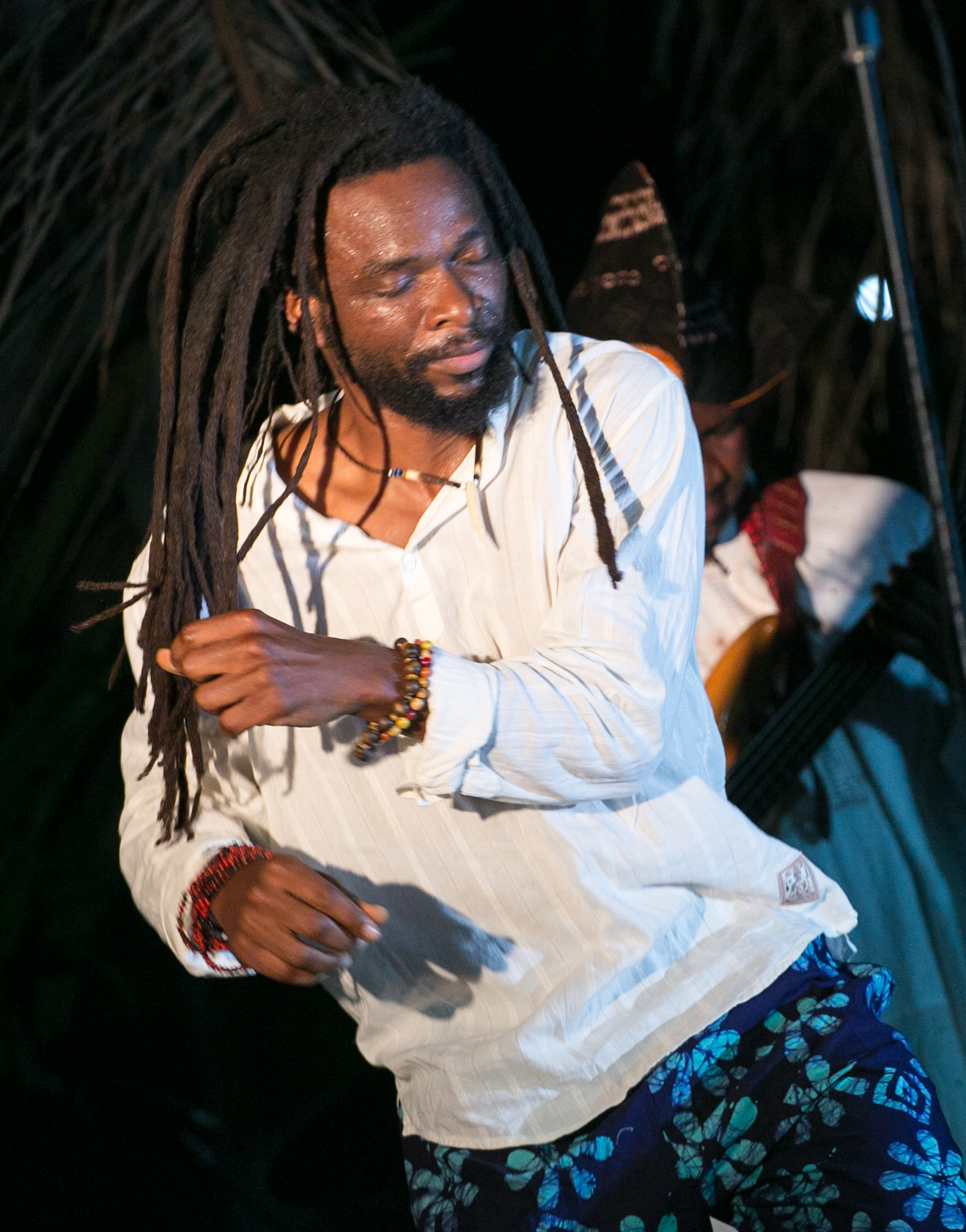

Background information
- Also known as: EniObanke, The Beautiful One
- Born: Olusegun Akinsete Akinlolu; 11 November 1968; Ibadan, Nigeria
- Genres: Folk; Roots
- Occupations: Singer-Songwriter, Musician, Bandleader, Poet, Writer
- Instruments: Vocals, guitar, percussion
- Years active: 1997–present
- Label: EniObanke
- Website: beautifulnubia.com

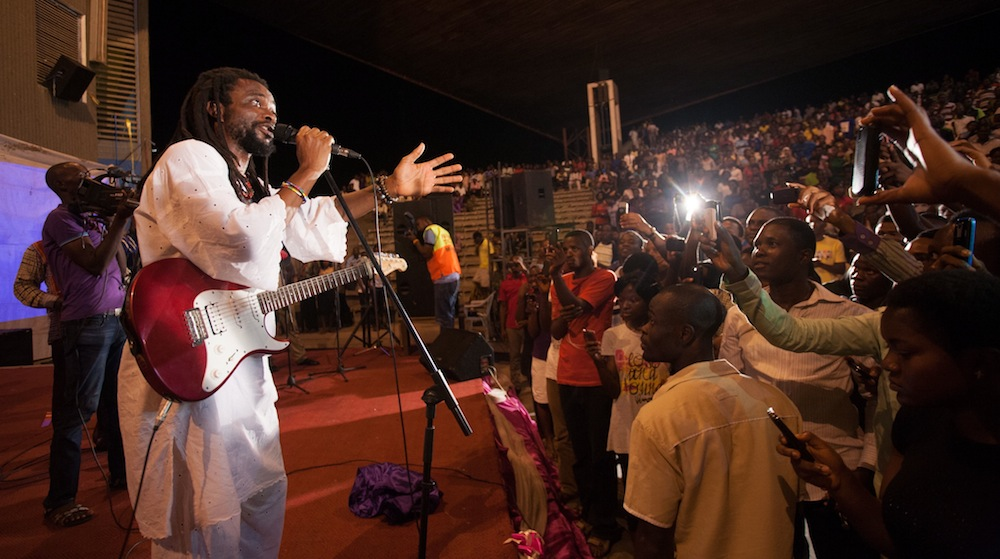
Beautiful Nubia in performance, 2012

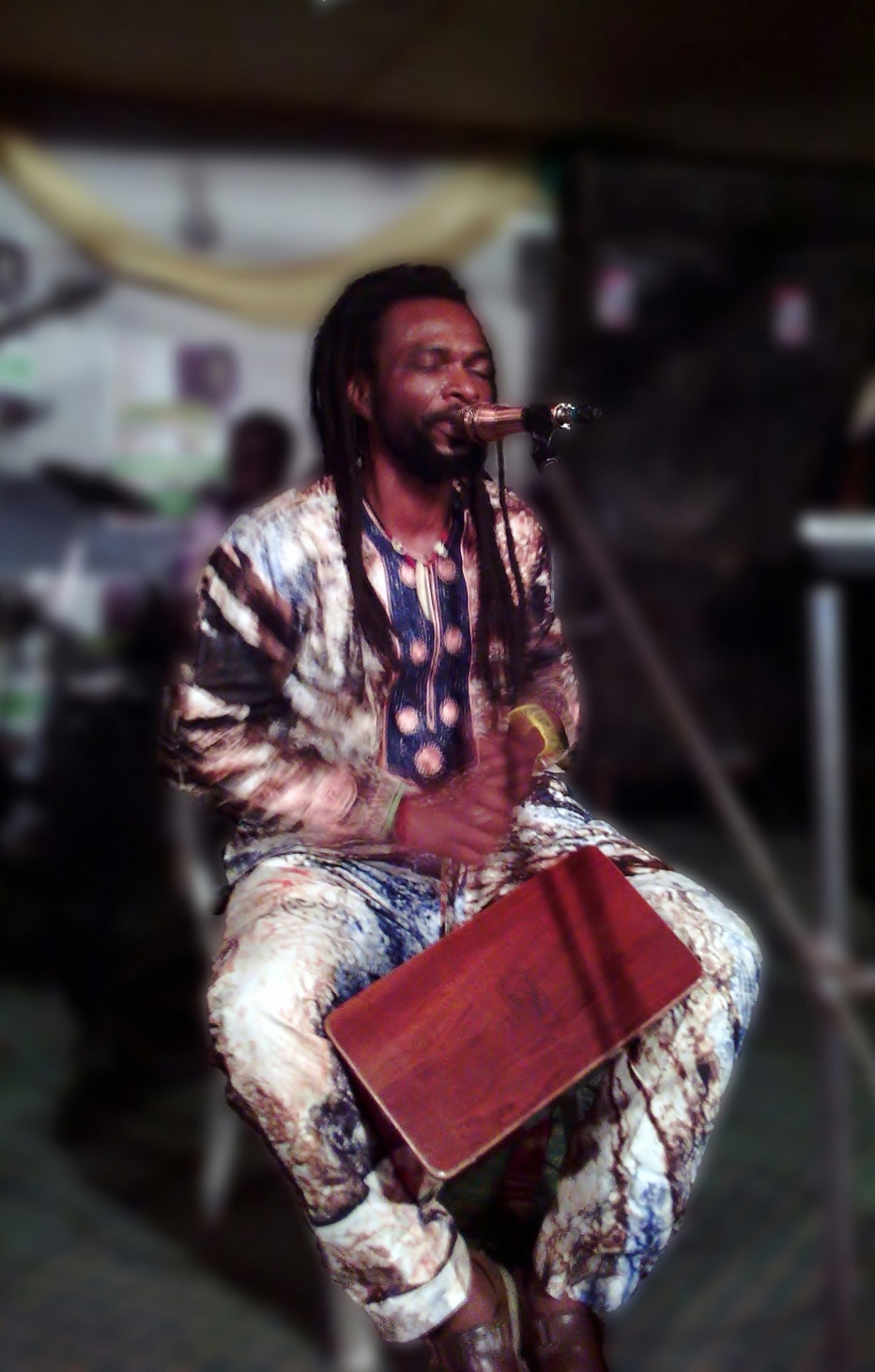
Beautiful Nubia at a concert in Ilorin, 2015

Beautiful Nubia is the performing name for Segun Akinlolu (born 11 November 1968), a Nigerian-born songwriter, music composer and band leader.

Beautiful Nubia and the Roots Renaissance Band is Nigeria's foremost contemporary folk and roots music group. Formed and fronted by songwriter and poet Segun Akinlolu (aka Beautiful Nubia), the group's songs and albums have achieved cult status among their loyal and growing fans spread across the world. Segun Akinlolu is an advocate of social reform and achieves this via his folk music."He has dedicated his lifetime to the enduring belief in the power of change; that our society is not irredeemable; that its inherent dysfunction is correctable."

== Theme ==
Beautiful Nubia's songs are built on rich folkloric traditions and native wisdom but his message is universal in thrust and theme: value life, respect nature and learn to live in peace with others. The music speaks for the voiceless and champions the dream of a balanced society where individuals are truly free and equal. It preaches love and tolerance but also urges people to stand and defend their rights when trampled upon anywhere in the world."His songs transcend parochialism. As they appeal to African sensibilities, so do they contain universal truths."

== Early Days ==
Born in Ibadan in 1968, Segun started writing songs at age nine. He drew his early influence from the traditional culture which was prevalent in the form of oral poetry, theatre, music and folklore. In 1997, he established EniObanke, a music production and marketing company, under which his first album was released in 1997. All subsequent recordings have been released on this label and, in 2010, the company commenced the first-ever folk and roots music festival in Nigeria, the annual EniObanke Music Festival (EMUfest). According to the artist, EniObanke - which means “The King’s Beloved” or “He Who is Pampered by the King” - is an original name he created for himself. Today, the name has become popular as a first name or cognomen for many people all over the world.

In 1998, the artist invited several young musicians in Lagos to form a backing band to which he gave the name The Roots Renaissance Band. Throughout the years, Beautiful Nubia has remained the songwriter, music composer, arranger and bandleader - contributing acoustic/rhythm guitar, lead and backing vocals and percussion.

== Highlight ==
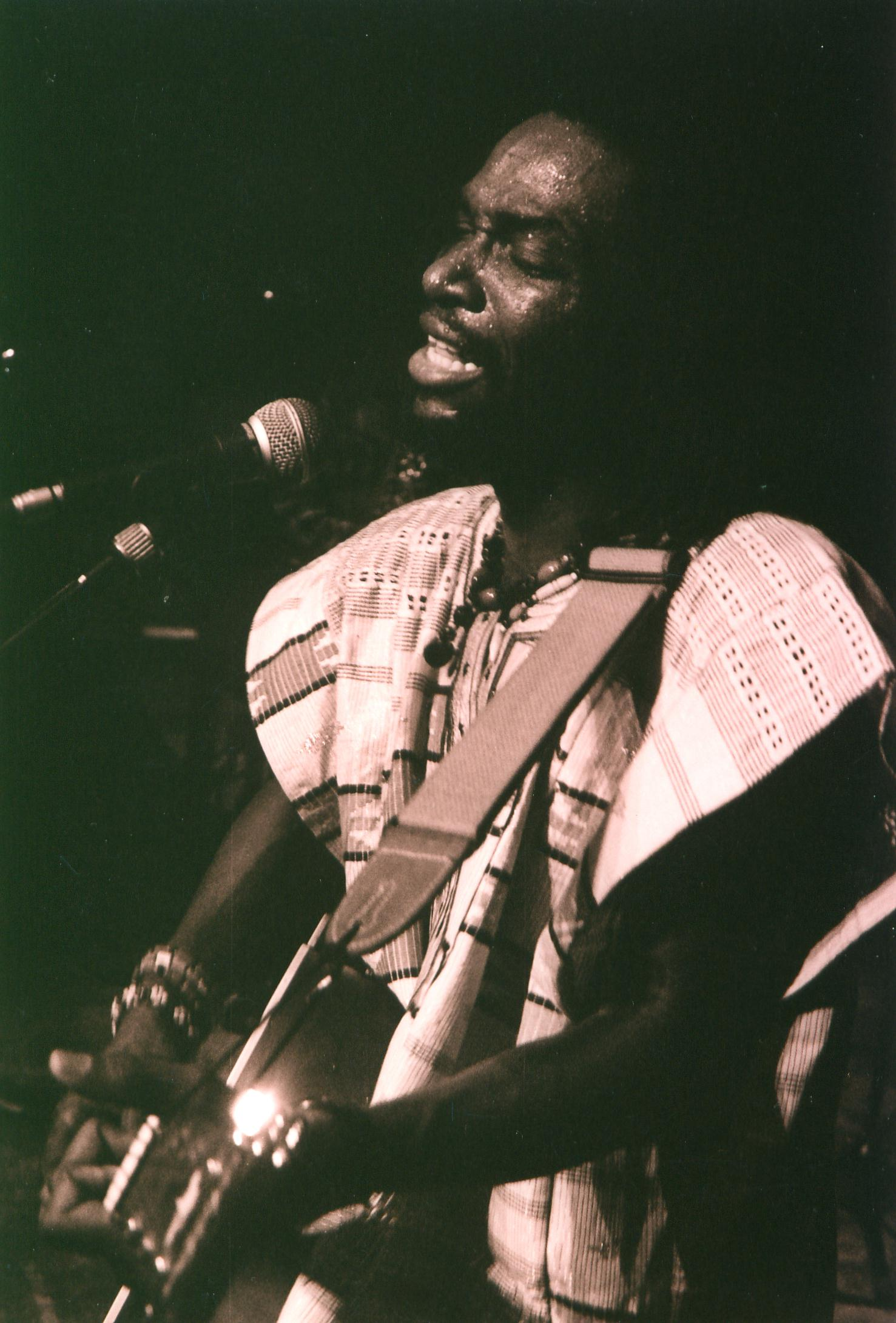
Beautiful Nubia live, 2004

Reward came in 2002 with the release of the ground-breaking third album Jangbalajugbu. It is estimated, by radio journalists, that more than 50 million Nigerians wake up each day to "How Do You Do? (Owuro L'ojo)", one of the hit tracks in the album. To date, Jangbalajugbu has sold in excess of a million copies (not including the large numbers sold in the open market by pirates). Since then, the band has released 17 more studio albums, all of which confirm what can be described as the Beautiful Nubia style and his stubborn refusal to be pigeon-holed. The over 250 original songs - didactic, philosophical and deeply moving - have cemented his reputation in Nigeria and beyond as an advocate for employing traditional wisdom in achieving personal and community development and social justice. It is the combination of enjoyable entertainment and provocative thoughtfulness that has come to define Beautiful Nubia's style. The music has garnered excellent reviews in leading African/world music publications. It has been nominated for music awards and topped international/world charts on community, grassroots and campus radio stations.

== Education ==
Segun Akinlolu graduated from the University of Ibadan with a Doctor of Veterinary Medicine (DVM) degree in 1992 and worked as a veterinarian for about 8 years. He also holds a Post-Graduate Diploma from the Nigeria Institute of Journalism.

== Intellectual Property Advocacy ==
Beautiful Nubia has been a vocal advocate for copyright integrity in the Nigerian music industry. On 19 February 2026, he publicly accused gospel artists Yinka Ayefele and BBO of infringing on the copyright of his 1997 classic "Seven Lifes." Specifically, he alleged that Ayefele’s 2012 song "My Faith in God (Igbagbo Ireti)" and BBO’s 2026 release "Amin" used his melodies without authorization. The incident highlighted ongoing debates regarding "interpolation" and the legal requirements for sampling within the Nigerian gospel and folk music scenes.

== Honours ==
In October 2016, Beautiful Nubia was conferred with the award of ‘Doctorate in Science (Honoris Causa) in Art’ by ESEP Le Berger University, Republic of Benin for his body of work.

In March 2024, Beautiful Nubia was honoured as a "UI at 75 Ambassador" by the University of Ibadan.

== Discography ==
STUDIO ALBUMS

- Ṣonṣo (2024)
- Olumuyiwa (2023)
- Hùrùhàrà (2021)
- Àpèjọ (2019)
- Atunluto (2018)
- Amunudun (2018)
- Iwa (2016)
- Taabaku (2016)
- Odds and Ends (2016)
- Soundbender (2015)
- Keere (2014)
- Oriojori-Eternal Spirits (2012)
- Sun No Dey Sleep (2011)
- Irinajo (2009)
- Kìlọ̀kìlọ̀ (2007)
- Fẹ̀rẹ̀ (2006)
- Awilele (2004)
- Jangbalajùgbú (2002)
- Voice From Heaven (1999)
- Seven Lifes (1997)

ACOUSTIC ALBUMS

- Embers of the Day (2025)
- Helen of the Good Tidings (2023)
- Lord of Letters (2022)
- Brand New Tales from a Small Room (2021)
- Several More Tales from a Small Room (2020)
- Even More Tales from a Small Room (2019)
- More Tales from a Small Room (2017)
- Tales from a Small Room (2017)

INSTRUMENTALS

- Rhythms of the Way (Instrumentals Vol. 2, 2020)
- Instrumentals, Vol. 1 (2019)

LIVE RECORDINGS

- Rootsmen at Work (2025)
- Essential Work (2021)
- Live Concert Series V (2018)
- Live Concert Series IV (2017)
- Live Concert Series III (2017)
- Live Concert Series II (2016)
- Live Concert Series I (2013)

POETRY CDs

- Like A Tale at Night (2006)
- Where Rivers Sing A Song (2004)
- On A Cold Evening (2001)

== Publications ==
- Passing Through (Reflections, 2025)
- In the Circle of the Happy Moon (Children's book, 2023)
- Sounds of Joy (Autobiography, 2018)
- Book of Songs (Lyrics, 2018)
- A WordMerchant's LogBook (Poetry, 2018)
- Citadel Blues (Fiction, 2004 and 2017)
- The King's Messenger (Poetry, 2004)
- Thinking Big (Poetry, 2000)
- Waiting For The Bones (Poetry, 1997)
