= Root cause =

Root cause may refer to:

- Root Cause (film), a 2019 documentary
- "Root Cause" (Cold Squad), a 2000 television episode
- "Root Cause" (Person of Interest), a 2012 television episode
- Root cause analysis, a problem solving technique
