= Rootes (surname) =

Rootes is a surname, and may refer to:

- Jamey Rootes (1966-2022), American sports executive
- Maurice Rootes (1917–1997), British film editor
- Nina Rootes, translator of French and Italian literature
- William Rootes, 1st Baron Rootes (1894–1964), founder of the Rootes Group
- William Geoffrey Rootes (1917–1992), 2nd Baron Rootes

== See also ==
- Roots (surname)
