= Radix Tetrad =

- Volumes: Radix; In Other Worlds; Arc of the Dream; The Last Legends of Earth
- Author: A. A. Attanasio
- Country: United States
- Language: English
- Genre: Science fiction novel
- Media type: Print (Hardback & Paperback)

The Radix Tetrad is a group of four science fiction books by A. A. Attanasio. The first novel, the Nebula Award-nominated Radix, was published in 1981, and the last novel, The Last Legends of Earth, was published in 1989.

== The Tetrad ==
- Radix (1981)
- In Other Worlds (1984)
- Arc of the Dream (1986)
- The Last Legends of Earth (1989)
