= Ivor Mairants =

Polish guitarist, teacher and composer

Ivor Mairants (18 July 1908 – 20 February 1998) was a Polish jazz and classical guitarist, teacher and composer. With his wife Lily Schneider in 1958 he created the Ivor Mairants Musicentre, a specialist guitar store in London.

== Early years ==
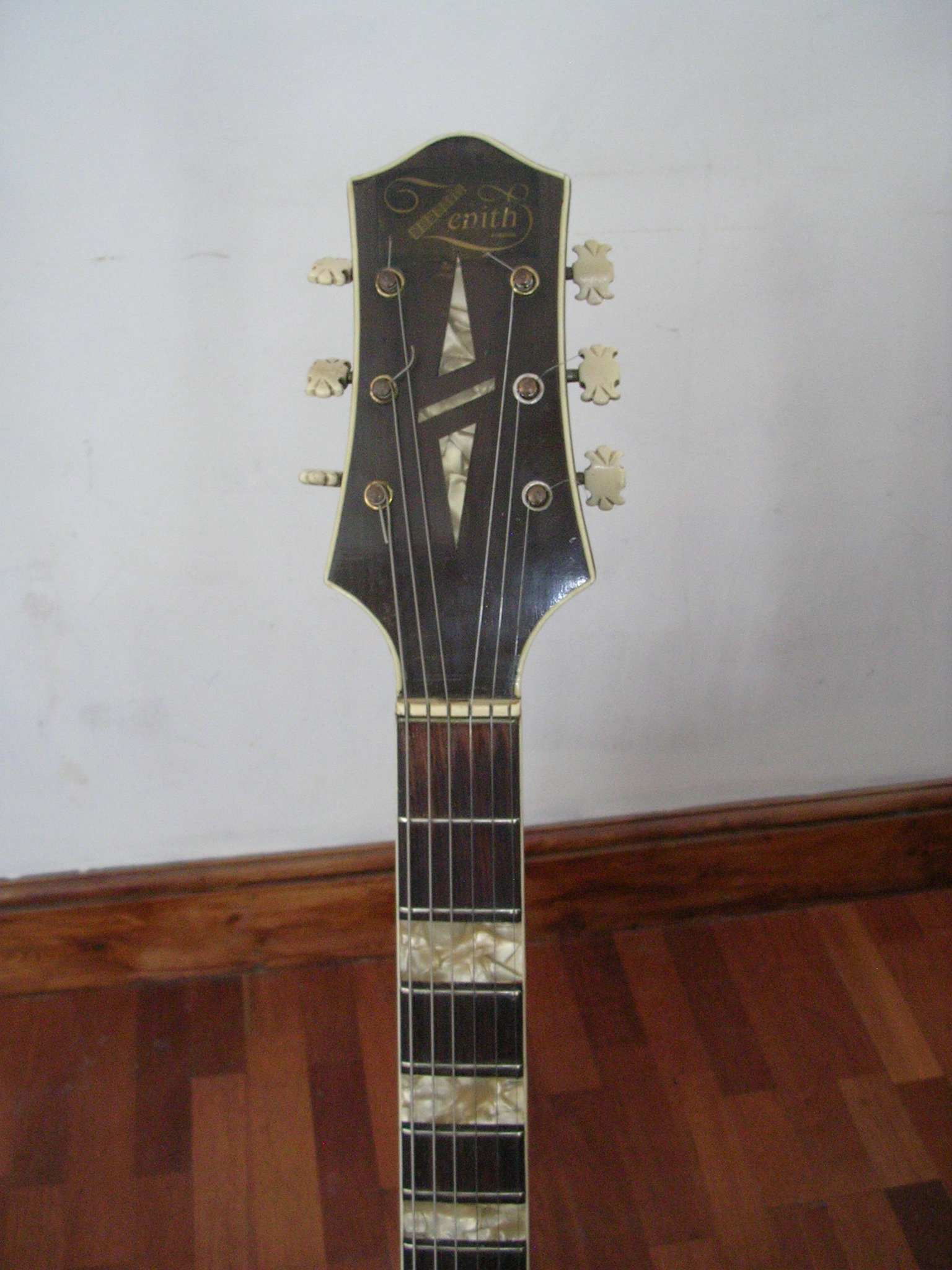
Zenith guitar headstock and neck

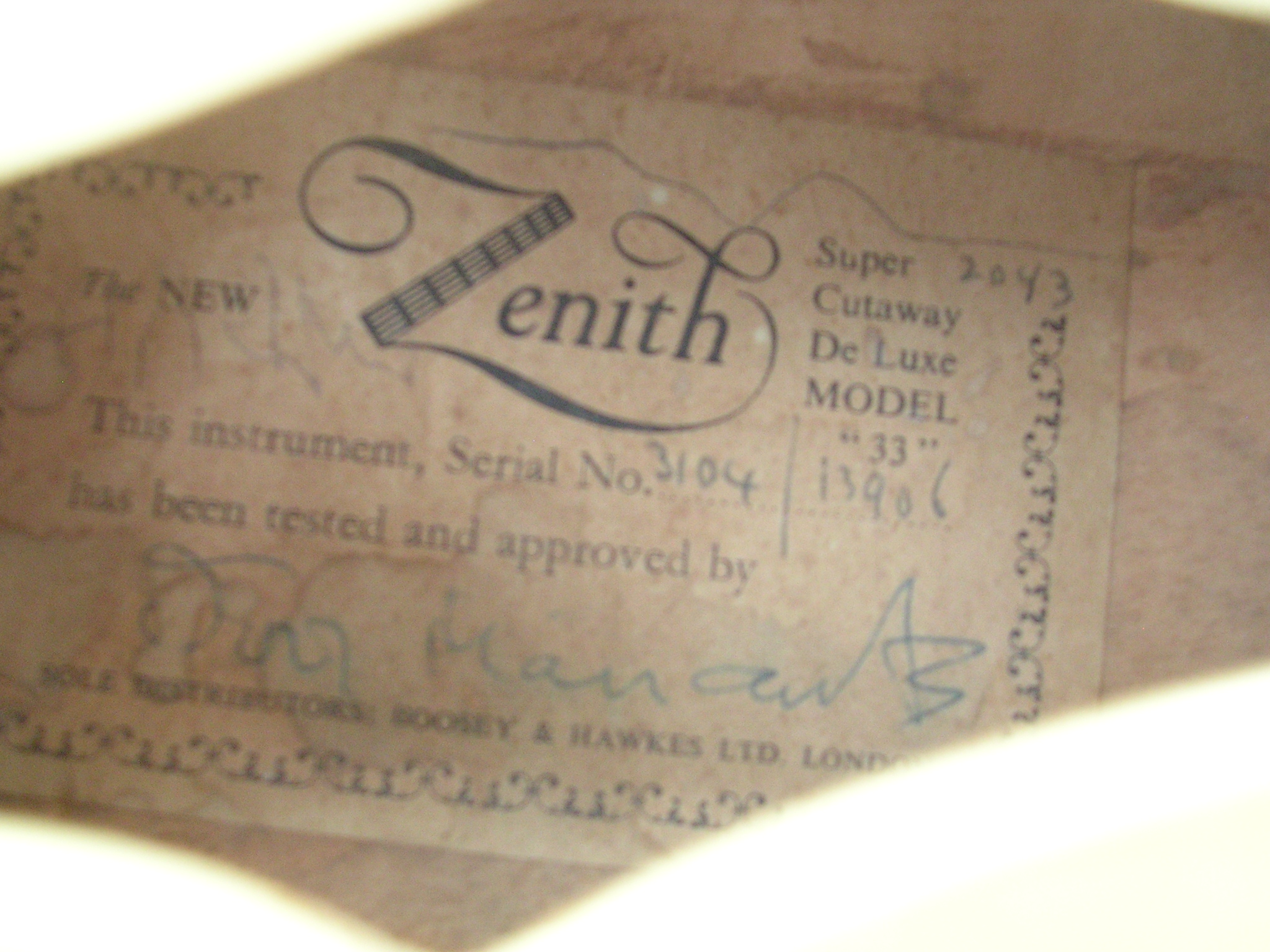
Zenith Guitar label detail

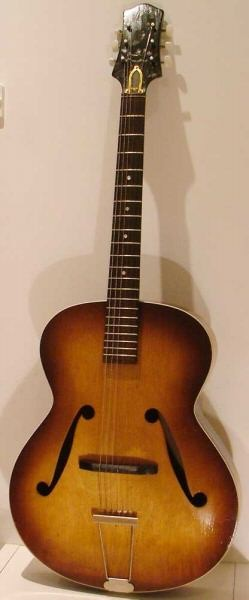
Framus Zenith model 17

Ivor Mairants was born in Rypin, Poland. He moved with his family to the United Kingdom in 1913 and attended Raine's Foundation School in Bethnal Green. He began learning the banjo at the age of 17, and became a professional musician three years later.

== Session musician ==
Beginning in the 1930s, he was a banjoist and guitarist for British dance bands led by Bert Firman, Ambrose, Roy Fox, Lew Stone, Geraldo, and Ted Heath. In the 1960s and 1970s his guitar playing was often heard on television, radio, film soundtracks, and many recordings with the Mantovani orchestra and with Manuel and his Music of the Mountains. His 1976 recording of the "Adagio" from Joaquin Rodrigo's Concierto de Aranjuez with Manuel sold over one million copies. His guitar quintet broadcast regularly in the late 1950s on the BBC's Guitar Club series.

In an interview Paul McCartney relates how he was surprised to see a 'chit' in Abbey Road Studios that Mairants had signed as a session musician - "...he was a God to us."

== Guitar ==
Mairants devoted much time to writing music and instructional method books for guitar. He worked with American guitarist Josh White on The Josh White Guitar Method (Boosey & Hawkes) in 1956. British guitarist John Renbourn and American guitarist Stefan Grossman (who was living in the UK at the time) have cited it as an influence on their playing. The success The Josh White Guitar Method prompted Mairants to commission a Zenith "Josh White" signature guitar based on Josh's Martin 0021 from German guitar maker Oscar Teller. Scottish guitarist Bert Jansch owned one of these models in his early playing years. On the last page of Josh White Guitar Method (printed 1956) there is a photo of this Zenith Josh White signature guitar and some text about it.

In 1958, his book The Flamenco Guitar was published. It was written with the cooperation of Torroba (conductor), Sabicas, and other guitarists.

The Guild Guitar Company in the US worked with Josh White on a signature model in 1965. Mark Dronge took Josh White to the Guild factory in 1965. A guitar made to Josh White's specifications was made and was meant to become a signature guitar for White, but it was never mass-produced. Dronge said, "The scene was starting to change. The Beatles were so influential and all these bands came out and the electric music was getting bigger and the plans for Josh White model just kind of fell by the wayside, unfortunately."

Mairants commissioned German guitar manufacturer Framus to make further Zenith Guitars, with Boosey & Hawkes the sole distributor and each guitar signed by him. These included the Zenith Model 17 acoustic which became Paul McCartney's first guitar and on which he wrote most of his early songs.

In 1958, with his wife Lily Schneider, he opened The Ivor Mairants Musicentre. This was Britain's first guitar shop, in the heart of the West End of London. He was often employed as a consultant for instrument makers and importers. The Ivor Mairants shop, in Rathbone Place, finally closed its doors in December 2019 after 61 years, though the business is still running online.

== Mairants School ==
In 1950 Mairants established the Central School of Dance Music in London, which he ran for 10 years. All instruments were taught at this establishment, but emphasis was given to guitar. Among the teaching staff at the school were Johnny Dankworth, Jack Brymer, Kenny Baker, Bert Weedon and Ike Isaacs, as well as Eric Gilder. In 1960 Mairants handed the school over to Gilder, who renamed it as the Eric Gilder School of Music.

== Composer ==
Mairants wrote many occasional pieces for jazz band, including Little Bo-Peep, Mustard & Cress, Pepper & Salt, Personal Call, Russian Salad, Salt & Summer Madness and Spring Fever. Solo guitar pieces include Homage To Mompou, Prelude a la Mode, Jazz Suite for Guitar (three movements), and Four Miniatures. Other published pieces include Flamenco Album No, 1, the Six Solos for Classic Guitar and Walking with Wes.

== Other activities ==
Beginning in the 1930s, Mairants was a columnist for Melody Maker, BMG, and Classical Guitar. In 1980, his biography, My Fifty Fretting Years, was published by Ashley Mark Publishing in the UK and, in 1995, his book The Great Jazz Guitarists, a collection of note-for-note transcriptions of historic jazz guitar solos, was published by Music Maker Publications in Cambridge, England.

He was a member of the Worshipful Society of Musicians, a British guild, and a Freeman of the City of London. In 1997 the Worshipful Society of Musicians inaugurated an annual competition for the Ivor Mairants Guitar Award.

His address in the 1960s was 44 Shepherd's Hill, London N.6.

== Bibliography ==
- Harper, Colin. Dazzling Stranger: Bert Jansch and the British Folk and Blues Revival, 2002
- Mairants, Ivor. Ivor Mairants' Guide to Latin American Rhythms for Guitar. London: Latin-American Music Publishing, 1962
- Mairants, Ivor. My Fifty Fretting Years. London: Ashley Mark Publishing Co, 1980
- Wald, Elijah. Josh White: Society Blues, 2000
