= Radix (novel) =

1981 novel by A. A. Attanasio

- First edition
- Author: A. A. Attanasio
- Cover artist: Fred Marcellino
- Language: English
- Series: Radix Tetrad
- Genre: Science fiction
- Publisher: William Morrow
- Publication date: 1981
- Publication place: United States
- Media type: Print (hardback & paperback)
- Pages: 467
- ISBN: 0-688-00135-1
- OCLC: 7306214
- Dewey Decimal: 813/.54 19
- LC Class: PS3551.T74 R3
- Followed by: In Other Worlds

Radix is a science fiction novel by American writer A. A. Attanasio, published in 1981 by Morrow. It was his debut work of science fiction. It was nominated for the Nebula Award for Best Novel in 1981. It is the first of four books in Attanasio's Radix Tetrad, followed by In Other Worlds in 1984.

Radix is the story of a young man's odyssey of self-discovery, from dangerous adolescent to warrior, from outcast to near-god, in a far-future Earth dramatically changed from the one we know.

== Characters ==
=== Sumner Kagan's alter-egos ===
- Sumner Kagan: The novel's hero, an overweight rebellious young man from a dysfunctional single-parent family. Father of Corby.
- The Eth: One of Sumner Kagan's alter-egos, a powerful being created by accident by the Delph's fears.
- Lotus Face: The name the Serbota tribe give to Sumner Kagan because of a facial scar in the shape of a lotus.
- Sugarat: One of Sumner Kagan's alternate identities, an unlikely vigilante who exacts a brutal revenge on local gangs that have negatively affected his life in some way.

=== Sumner's companions ===
- Corby: A voor, child of Jeanlu and Sumner Kagan. Eventually he puts his mind into Sumner Kagan's body.
- Nefandi: An artificial man bioengineered by the eo. He serves the godmind called the Delph in return for a drugless brain stimulator called Coobla.
- Dice: An inmate at a military prison called Meat City who befriends Sumner Kagan.
- Ardent Fang: A member of the mutant Serbota tribe.
- Drift: A né, also a member of the Serbota tribe and a genderless being with telepathic abilities.

=== Minor characters ===
- Zelda: Sumner Kagan's mother, who makes a living as a spirit guide.
- Johnny Yesterday: A lodger at Sumner Kagan's mother's house. An old man whose genetic mutations allow for "deep mind" abilities, which occasionally manifest themselves telekenetically.
- Jeanlu: A voor, who lives in the Rigalu salt flats. Mother of Corby.
- Broux: The commander of Meat City who trains Sumner Kagan.
- Bonescrolls: A long-lived being who has had many different bodies. He has powerful mutant abilities and is a protector of the Serbota tribe.

=== The Delph ===
- The Delph: A godmind whose powerful mental abilities are waning.
- Jac Halevy-Cohen: A mutant from an earlier time whose mental abilities evolve him into the Delph.
