= Root Cause (film) =

Film claiming root canals cause disease

- Directed by: Frazer Bailey
- Produced by: Justin Lyons
- Starring: Ben Purser
- Cinematography: Simon Christidis
- Music by: Mark McDuff
- Production company: Play Pictures
- Release date: January 1, 2019
- Running time: 73 minutes
- Country: Australia
- Language: English

Root Cause is a documentary film produced by Frazer Bailey. The film makes claims regarding symptoms and illness that purportedly can originate from root canal treatment. The film has been denounced by dentists for making false and misleading claims.

== Premise ==
The film follows the filmmaker's 10-year journey to solve his chronic fatigue and anxiety, starting with mainstream medicine but then winding through a range of alternative medicine practices, and finally arriving at the conclusion that his old root canals were the source of his ailments.

In the film, root canal therapies are claimed to be associated with cancer, and it is suggested that pulling an infected tooth is a better approach. The film's trailer implies that root canals or infected teeth can lead to migraines, diabetes, lupus, fibromyalgia and heart disease. The film makes specific false claims of "97% of patients with breast cancer had a root canal on the same side as the cancer," and "the #1 cause of heart attack is root canal treated teeth," and that root canals result in inflammation leading to systemic disease.

== Reception ==
The film was released in 2019 on Netflix, Amazon, Vimeo, iTunes, Google Play and YouTube. The American Dental Association, American Association of Endodontists and the American Association of Dental Research sent a private letter to media companies hosting the film and warned them that "continuing to host the film could harm the viewing public by spreading long-disproven claims." The film was subsequently removed from Netflix less than a month after its release, and later from Amazon.

Dentist Tom Pagonis writes that the film "rehash[es] an old and disproven theory of focal infection disease — or that root canal treated teeth are responsible for practically every human chronic degenerative disease including the filmmaker's particular ailments." Dr. Fred Barnett, chair of dentistry and program director of endodontics at Einstein Healthcare Network in Philadelphia said, "there hasn't been one valid medical or scientific study published anywhere that can show causation between having a root canal and developing cancer." The American Association of Endodontists wrote, "The film's premise is based on junk science and faulty testing conducted more than 100 years ago, that was first debunked in the 1950s". The president of the American Dental Association said the film "contains significant misinformation that is not supported by scientific evidence, which can cause unwarranted fear among viewers".

PolitiFact evaluated the film's claim that a root canal can shut down 63% of your immune system with, "We rate this claim about root canals leading to serious illnesses False."

The people in this movie are spreading misinformation and confusion about root canal treatment that is misleading and harmful to the consumer public. Their premise is based on junk science and faulty testing conducted more than 100 years ago that was debunked in the 1950s, continuously since then and is even more discredited today by physicians, dentists and academics. Mainstream medical and dental communities overwhelmingly agree that root canal treatment is safe, effective and eliminates pain.

— UCLA School of Dentistry, Response to Netflix Documentary: Root Cause
