= In Other Worlds =

1985 novel by A. A. Attanasio

- First edition
- Author: A. A. Attanasio
- Language: English
- Series: Radix Tetrad
- Genre: Science fiction novel
- Publication date: 1985, re-released 2008 Phoenix Pick
- Publication place: United States
- Media type: Print (hardback & paperback)
- Pages: 175 (176 2008 edition)
- ISBN: 0-552-99168-6 (978-160450-262-6 2008 Edition)
- OCLC: 14244036
- Preceded by: Radix
- Followed by: Arc of the Dream

In Other Worlds is a 1985 novel by American writer A. A. Attanasio, the second in his Radix Tetrad. It contains humans, zōtl, Rimstalkers, other spatial dimensions, and time-travel/temporal distortion as do other novels in the Radix series, though they are re-envisioned.

== Plot ==
Carl Schirmer's life is transformed when he is turned into energy by an eighth-dimensional being and transported to a faraway world at the edge of a black hole.

What follows is a story similar to Flash Gordon involving a woman from the end of time, a man who can live off sunlight, and an alternate, paradisaical Earth in which World War II never happened.

== Characters ==
- Carl Schirmer: An everyman who is abducted and transformed by the Eld Skyle. A reluctant hero who soon learns to wield a laser baton, fly a rocket ship, and find true love.
- Eld Skyle: An eighth-dimensional life-form who feeds on the imperfections of other life-forms, transforming them into idealized versions of their former selves.
- Evoë: A denizen of the strange world the Eld Skyle brings Carl to.
- Zee: A friend of Carl's who discovers key secrets to the universe.
