= Rutaba Yaqub =

- Also known as: Roots
- Born: Saudi Arabia
- Origin: Indie pop
- Occupation: Singer-songwriter

Rutaba Yaqub is a Saudi-born singer of Pakistani descent, based in Pakistan. Her big break came on the television series Nescafé Basement, and she later went on to compete in the Pepsi Battle of the Bands.

== Career ==
Rutaba Yaqub was born in Saudi Arabia and moved to Lahore, Pakistan in 2010, to study computer engineering at the University of Central Punjab. While there, she began singing publicly and was discovered by music producer Zulfiqar Jabbar Khan (also known as Xulfi). She began working as a backing singer on Xulfi's television series Nescafé Basement. The Express Tribune considered her one of two breakout acts of the show's first two seasons, while Yaqub felt that without the show she would not have pursued a musical career.

Yaqub started to write her own songs, but that career path risked closing when her family began to pressure her to return to Saudi Arabia following her graduation from University. She decided to remain in Pakistan, and used the experience as inspiration for her song writing on her first EP Échapper (French for escape). Her parents are supportive of her ongoing singing career. Yaqub received further exposure after recording a cover version of Coldplay's "The Scientist" which was streamed online several thousand times. Her first single from Échapper was entitled "Hold On". Following the death of singer turned preacher Junaid Jamshed, Yaqub spoke of her shock to Public Radio International.

In 2017, she appeared on Pepsi Battle of the Bands on PTV Home finishing third as part of the band Roots, who played a mixture of electropop, synth-pop and progressive pop. Her solo recordings are entirely in English, and more in the indie pop genre. Yaqub met the other members of the band, who were all in a group called Wisdom Salad, through the rapper Moe Nawaz, and she invited them to join her on the show. Yaqub had been known as Roots previously, but after lending that name to the band, she now plays solo under her own name. The band came third overall in the contest. Yaqub along with several others also sang with Meesha Shafi on a Mother's Day tribute song.
