= Grace W. Root =

Grace Worcester Root (25 April 1869 – 15 July 1898) was an American actress and composer who died from chloroform poisoning. She published her music under the name Grace W. Root.

Root was born in Boston to a musical family. Her mother was Mary Olive Woodman and her father was George Frederick Root, who was well known for his Civil War songs. Her older brother Frederic Woodman Root was also a composer.

Little is known about Root's education. She appeared as an actress with a company run by the Frohman Brothers, and died from chloroform poisoning in Portland, Maine, when she was 29 years old.

Root's music was published by Summy Birchard. Her songs included:

- "A Sunset Song" (text by Sidney Lanier)
- "For Thee"
- "The Spell of the Waltz"
