= Frederic Woodman Root =

American composer and music educator

Frederic Woodman Root (13 June 1846, Boston – 8 November 1916, Chicago) was an American composer, choir conductor, organist, adjudicator and music teacher.

== Early life and education ==
Root was the son of George Frederick Root, who was known for composing Civil War songs, and the brother of the composer Grace W. Root. He studied music under BC Blodgett, William Mason, James Flint and Robert Goldbeck, and studied singing in New York City with Carlo Bassini and Luigi Vannuccini from Florence. From 1869 to 1870 he undertook a study tour of Europe.

== Career ==
Root composed songs, cantatas, an operetta, and other works, including many for use in singing and piano lessons. He wrote articles and essays for a number of music related publications. Root was the editor of the periodical Song Messenger for several years.

Root became a singing teacher, and published several textbooks for singing lessons, including The Pacific Glee Book with James R. Murray, The School of Singing, and Root's New Course in Voice Culture and Singing.

Root gave lectures to promote his teaching methods and opinions about music in general. In one of his speeches he characterized African American gospel songs as "developed from the formless and untutored sounds of savage people... being hardly developed to the point at which they might be called music".
