= Darko Hudelist =

Croatian journalist and history writer

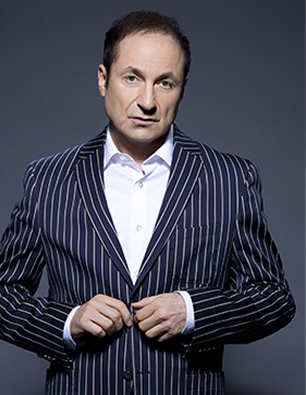
- Born: 1959 (age 65–66); Zagreb, Socialist Republic of Croatia, SFR Yugoslavia
- Education: Bachelor's degree in Political Science (graduated from the Faculty of Political Science in Zagreb in 1982)
- Occupation(s): Journalist, non-fiction writer, contemporary history researcher
- Known for: worked for Start magazine from 1982 until 1991; currently works for the weekly news magazine Globus; regularly writes for the Jutarnji List newspaper.
- Website: www.darkohudelist.com; www.darkohudelist.eu

Darko Hudelist (born 1959) is a Croatian journalist, non-fiction writer and researcher of contemporary history.

== Biography ==
Hudelist was born in Zagreb and completed his elementary and secondary education (gymnasium) in Đurđevac. In 1982, he graduated from the Faculty of Political Science in Zagreb with a bachelor's degree in political science. He began his career in journalism in 1979 working as a rock critic for the youth weekly publication Polet. From 1982 until 1991, Hudelist was as a regular contributor and member of the editorial staff for the magazine Start. In the late 1980s, he systemically monitored and analyzed events preceding the breakup of the Socialist Federal Republic of Yugoslavia, after which he published his first book Kosovo – bitka bez iluzija (Kosovo – A Battle without Illusions, 1989). His legendary investigative report Split vražji otok (lit. Devil Island Split) was published during the same period (Start, March 1988).

In 1989, he collaborated with the French magazine Les Temps Modernes which published his analytical articles on the conflicts between Albanians and Macedonians in the Socialist Republic of Macedonia; these articles were originally published in Start in the spring of 1988.

Hudelist marked the period during which the first political parties in the Socialist Republic of Croatia were created with his book Banket u Hrvatskoj: Prilozi povijesti hrvatskog višestranačja 1989.-1990. (Banquet in Croatia: Historical Contributions to Croatia's Multipartyism during 1989–1990), which was published in the early summer of 1991. The book proved to be very successful (and it was preceded by a six-part series published in the Nedjeljna Dalmacija weekly newspaper). A slightly revised edition of the book was published in 1999.

In 1992, Hudelist published a book about war journalism in Croatia titled Novinari pod šljemom (Journalists under Helmets).

In 1994, he served as an advisor for Croatia's BBC team which was working on the documentary The Death of Yugoslavia. From 1993 until the late 1990s, he was also a regular contributor for Erasmus, a magazine which promoted liberal democracy.

In 1995, Hudelist began writing for the leading Croatian weekly news magazine Globus, for which he still writes today. He authored and published many articles for Globus as well as having published extensive analytical interviews with prominent Croatian politicians and full-length series about the most significant political and historically political topics like Ratni memoari generala Martina Špegelja (War Memoirs of General Martin Špegelj, 1995), Tuđman: biografija (Tuđman: A Biography, 1996–1997), Kanadski životopis Gojka Šuška (A Canadian Biography of Gojko Šušak, 1999–2000), Trinaest stoljeća kršćanstva u Hrvata (Thirteen Centuries of Christianity amongst Croatians, 2008), etc.

At the end of 1995, he wrote a lengthy Izvještaj o hrvatskoj estradi (A Report on Croatia's Pop Music) for Globus in the form of two separate texts. From 1996, he spent several years studying the life story of Croatia's first President Franjo Tuđman. This led to the publishing of his book Tuđman: biografija (Tuđman: Biography) in 2004, which the Jutarnji List in early 2005 proclaimed the best book of the year in the field of journalism.

After that book, Darko Hudelist began his extensive research of the history of Croatian-Serbian relations and conflicts in the 20th century. In May 2006, he established a research office in Belgrade where he resided until June 2011. During that time, he carried out archival research (in all of Belgrade's historical archives, from the Yugoslavian Archive to the Archive of the Serbian Academy of Sciences and Art) and he spoke with numerous witnesses of contemporary history. The most notable amongst these witnesses was the father of modern Serbian nationalism Dobrica Ćosić.

In his book Moj beogradski dnevnik: Susreti i razgovori s Dobricom Ćosićem 2006.-2011. (My Belgrade Journal: Meetings and conversations with Dobrica Ćosić 2006–2011), published in July 2012, Hudelist immortalized the period he spent in Belgrade.

In parallel to conducting his research in Belgrade, Hudelist was also researching in Zagreb where he especially focused on the political activities of the Croatian Catholic church in Yugoslavia – with an emphasis on the 1970s and 1980s during which time the church's large project Trinaest stoljeća kršćanstva u Hrvata (Thirteen centuries of Christianity in Croatia, 1975–1984).,

In 2013, Darko Hudelist completed the research he carried out for multiple years and he turned to writing new books. He announced the release of an entire library of books that would carry the title Dvadeseto stoljeće (The Twentieth Century) and which would be composed of several individual books, each of which would be dedicated to a particular topic. The first book would deal with the church (both within the context of the world and domestically, with an emphasis on the Croatian Catholic church's Jubilee cycle Thirteen centuries of Christianity in Croatia (Thirteen centuries of Christianity amongst Croatians). while the second book would be about Croatian-Serbian relations and conflicts (including the war and breakup of SFR Yugoslavia) in the 20th century.,

A new book about Franjo Tuđman is planned to be published, which will mainly deal with his statesmanship activities (in the period between 1990 and 1999). The first book in that series (the book about the Catholic church and its political activities in the SFR Yugoslavia) will be released at the beginning of the second half of 2015. Since 2014, Darko Hudelist has been writing for the Jutarnji List.

== Works ==
His first book Kosovo – bitka bez iluzija (Kosovo – A Battle without Illusions) was published in May 1989. This book deals with the conflict between Serbians and Albanians in Kosovo in the late 1980s. Also in this book, Hudelist foreshadows the bloody breakup of Yugoslavia which soon follows in the early 1990s.

Hudelist's second book, Banket u Hrvatskoj: Prilozi povijesti hrvatskog višestranačja 1989.-1990. (Banquet in Croatia: Historical Contributions to Croatia's Multipartyism of 1989–1990) gives a witty Krležian portrayal of politicians and intellectuals who were, during the breakup of Yugoslavia, forming the first political parties in Croatia and in such a way laying the foundation for Croatia's separation from the SFR Yugoslavia and its independence. The main protagonist during these events was the founder of the HDZ (Croatian Democratic Union) Franjo Tuđman. The first edition of the book Banket u Hrvatskoj (Banquet in Croatia) was published in 1991 and the second (slightly revised edition) was published in 1999.

Hudelist's third book Novinari pod šljemom (Journalists Under Helmets, 1992) analyses war journalism in Croatia during the Homeland War of 1991.

Darko Hudelist's fourth book Tuđman: biografija (Tuđman: A Biography) was the first integrated biography about Croatia's first President Franjo Tuđman. The book is quite lengthy (with some 1500 cards of text); it proved to be very successful and was sold out in a short amount of time; however, it also caused numerous controversies.

Hudelist's fifth book Moj beogradski dnevnik: Susreti i razgovori s Dobricom Ćosićem 2006.-2011. (My Belgrade Journal: Meetings and Conversations with Dobrica Ćosić 2006–2011) was a kind of recapitulation of his historical research in Belgrade during that period and, at the same time, a fairly complex and multi-dimensional portrait of the most significant protagonist of Serbian nationalism in Tito's Yugoslavia, Dobrica Ćosić. Amongst other things he shared with Hudelist, Ćosić revealed his suicidal thoughts, which he was obsessed with since his youth and which significantly predefined his public and political (appositional) activities in the SFR Yugoslavia. At the same time, that book was a precursor for Hudelist's new cycle of books under the collective title Dvadeseto stoljeće (The Twentieth Century).

== Awards ==
Received the "Sedam sekretara SKOJ-a" award in 1989 for the book Kosovo – bitka bez iluzija (Kosovo – A Battle without Illusions).

Received the Croatian Journalists' Association's award for Best Interview of the Year in 2002 (for his interview with Andrija Hebrang).

Received the Jutarnji list's award for Best Book of the Year in the Field of Journalism in 2005 for his book Tuđman – biografija (Tuđman: A Biography).
