= Root River =

Root River may refer to:

== Canada ==
- Root River (Northwest Territories), a tributary of the Mackenzie River
- Root River (Algoma District), a tributary of the St. Marys River
- Root River (Kenora District), a tributary of Lac Seul

== United States ==
- Root River (Minnesota)
- Root River (Wisconsin)
- Root River State Trail, Minnesota
