= Elmar Roots =

Estonian veterinarian

Elmar Roots (19 April 1900 Priipalu, Kuigatsi Parish, Estonia – 12 December 1962 Giessen, Germany) was an Estonian veterinarian.

He participated on Estonian War of Independence. He graduated from the Tartu Teachers' Seminary in 1920. In 1924, he graduated from Tartu University with a degree in veterinary medicine. He taught at Tartu University from 1928 to 1941, where he was dean of the Faculty of Veterinary Medicine from 1931 to 1937 and vice-rector for administration from 1938 to 1940.

After moving to Germany in 1941, he worked at the Institute of Food Hygiene at the University of Berlin until 1945. He worked at Giessen University from 1947 to 1962.

His main fields of research were milk hygiene, animal health, mastitis, and microbiology.

== Works ==
- Über den Keimgehalt gesunder und kranker Uteri unserer Haustiere (kaasautor). // Centralbl. f. Bakteriol. Parasitenkunde u. Infektionskrankheiten 110 (1929) 1–3
- Die Brucellose und ihre Bekämpfung. // Zweite Vet.-tagung der Baltischen Staaten vom 8.–11. August in Tartu und Tallinn. Tartu, 1935
- Veterinärhygiene (one of the authors). Berlin, 1955
- Herstellung des Salmonella gallinarum-Trockenantigens für die Agglutinationsreaktion (kaasautor). // Berliner und Münchener Tierärztliche Wschr. (1958) 22
- Elektronmikroskopische Untersuchungen an Gehirnen bei der experimentellen Tollwutinfektion. // Z. f. Naturschutzung 17b (1962) 3.
