= Rooting =

Rooting may refer to:

- Gaining superuser access to a computer system
  - Rooting (Android), attaining root access on Android devices
  - Jailbreaking (iOS), overriding iOS software restrictions
- Cutting (plant), a plant propagation technique
- the rooting reflex
- the Australian slang for having sexual intercourse
