= Koreni (novel) =

1954 novel by Dobrica Ćosić

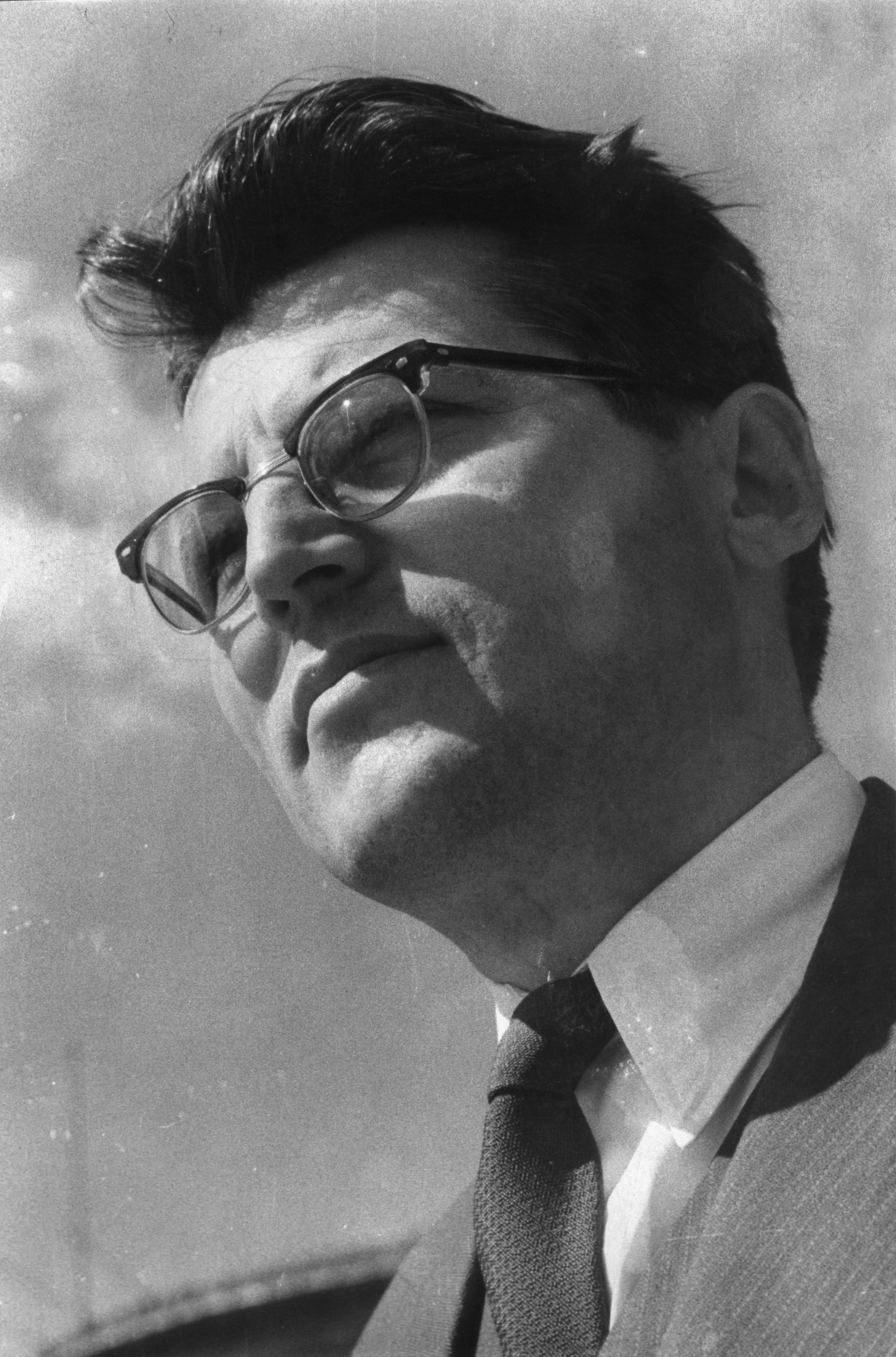

Koreni ("The Roots") is the second novel of Serbian author Dobrica Ćosić. The novel was published in 1954. Its literary genre is epics. It is also a psychological novel.

Novel is set in the late 19th century Kingdom of Serbia, a time of great political turbulence between central, modern government and local power holders as well as political parties. Main character of the novel is Acim Katic, a prominent member of the People's Radical Party and an informal chieftain of the village Prerovo. Living in a large homestead with his loan shark son Djordje, daughter-in-law Simka and her mother, he is concerned by two things - the childless marriage of Djordje as well as the upcoming wedding of his other son, a western-educated and modern Vukasin, to the daughter of his political enemy. Colorful group of other characters are also present. Novel deals with both political and societal aspects of the time, with things as patriarchy, family, female sexuality, political alliances, conflict between central and local power all being discussed.

== Characters ==
Acim Katic - Head of the family. And old, stubborn, conservative man, he is obsessed with politics, personal principles and with prolonging his family's existence.

Djordje Katic - Older son of Acim. He's a drunkard, a cheat and an occasional loan shark. In his mid-thirties, he is in an unhappy marriage with Simka, a marriage that failed to produce a child after 15 years. Pressures imposed on him and Simka, as well as complexes Vukasin bears because of it, create one of the central parts of the plot of the novel

Vukasin Katic - Younger son of Acim. He was educated in best schools of France, which taught him modern ideas of strong centralized government, anti-traditionalism and individualism. With a mixed feeling of disdain and admiration towards his people, he enters the politics on the opposite side of his father.

Simka Katic - Djordje's wife, accused of being a nerotkinja, a derogatory term for infertile women.

Tolo Dacic - A peasant living near the Katic homestead, works as a caretaker and occasional laborer for the Katic's. Dimwitted, simple and content with his very modest life, having four children but no money he is the polar opposite of Vukasin in nearly every way.
