= Roots music =

Roots music may refer to:

- American folk music
- Americana (music), a style incorporating early blues, country, folk, rhythm and blues, and rock influences
- Folk music
- Rasin, Haitian roots music
- Roots reggae
- Roots revival, a trend which includes young performers popularizing the traditional musical styles of their ancestors
- Roots rock
- World music
