= 2000–2002 Montenegrin municipal elections =

- June 2000 - October 2002
Party	ZZP	ECG
Mayors	9 / 21	6 / 21
Party	LSCG	DUA
Mayors	5 / 21	1 / 21
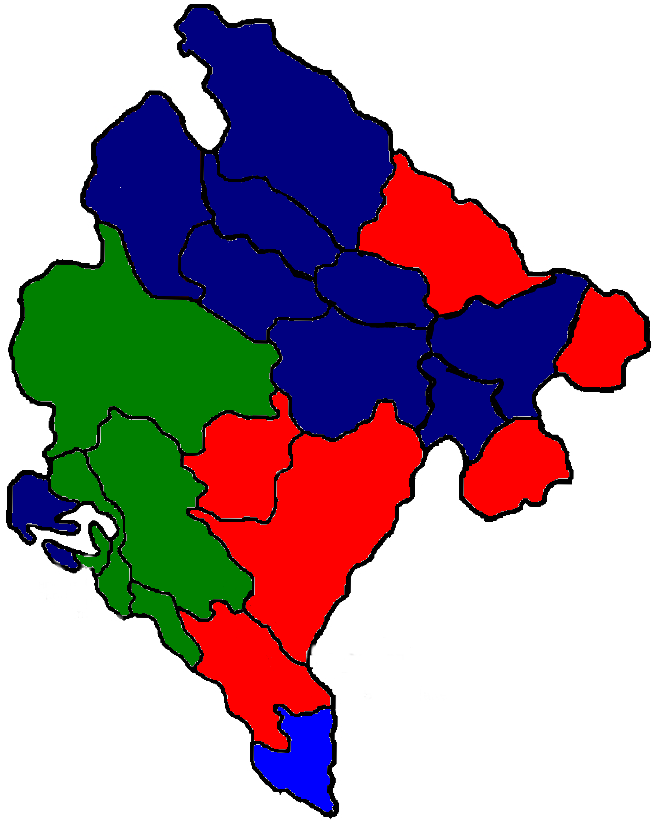
- Mayoral seats

Municipal elections were held in all 21 municipalities in Montenegro between June 2000 and October 2002.

It resulted in the victory of the opposition subjects in most of the municipalities, while the ruling DPS remained in power in only six out of 21 municipalities.

== Results ==
=== Podgorica ===
Party	Votes	%	Seats
"To Live Better" – Milo Đukanović	44,121	50.20	28
"Yugoslavia" – Momir Bulatović	34,585	39.35	22
Liberal Alliance of Montenegro	6,740	7.67	4
"Together for Malesija"	1,483	1.69	0
League of Communists of Montenegro	565	0.64	0
"Serbian Unity"	210	0.24	0
Liberal Democratic Party	193	0.22	0
Total	87,897	100.00	54
Valid votes	87,897	99.15	
Invalid/blank votes	757	0.85	
Total votes	88,654	100.00	
Registered voters/turnout	112,366	78.90	
Source: CEMI

=== Herceg Novi ===
Party	Votes	%	Seats
"Yugoslavia" – Momir Bulatović	8,076	49.63	19
"To Live Better" – Milo Đukanović	6,306	38.75	14
Liberal Alliance of Montenegro	1,246	7.66	2
Social Democratic Party of Montenegro	376	2.31	0
Group of Independent Citizens	268	1.65	0
Total	16,272	100.00	35
Valid votes	16,272	98.48	
Invalid/blank votes	251	1.52	
Total votes	16,523	100.00	
Registered voters/turnout	22,040	74.97	
Source: CEMI

=== Results in rest of municipalities ===
After the elections the ruling DPS–SDP coalition remained in power in Bar, Bijelo Polje, Danilovgrad, Plav and Rožaje municipalities. The major opposition coalition Together for Change (SNP–SNS–NS) formed majority in Mojkovac, Berane, Žabljak, Plužine, Šavnik, Pljevlja, Andrijevica and Kolašin, while in Nikšić, Tivat, Kotor, Cetinje and Budva they formed a post-election coalition with Liberal Alliance of Montenegro to form municipal governments. In the Boka region, including Tivat, the newly founded Croatian Civic Initiative had some success.
