= 2002 Montenegrin parliamentary election =

Parliamentary election held in Montenegro, FR Yugoslavia

← 2001	20 October 2002	2006 →
Party	Leader	Vote %	Seats	+/–
ECG	Milo Đukanović	47.98	39	+3
ZZP	Predrag Bulatović	38.43	30	−3
LSCG	Miodrag Živković	5.85	4	−2
AZ	Fuad Nimani	2.44	2	0
This lists parties that won seats. See the complete results below.
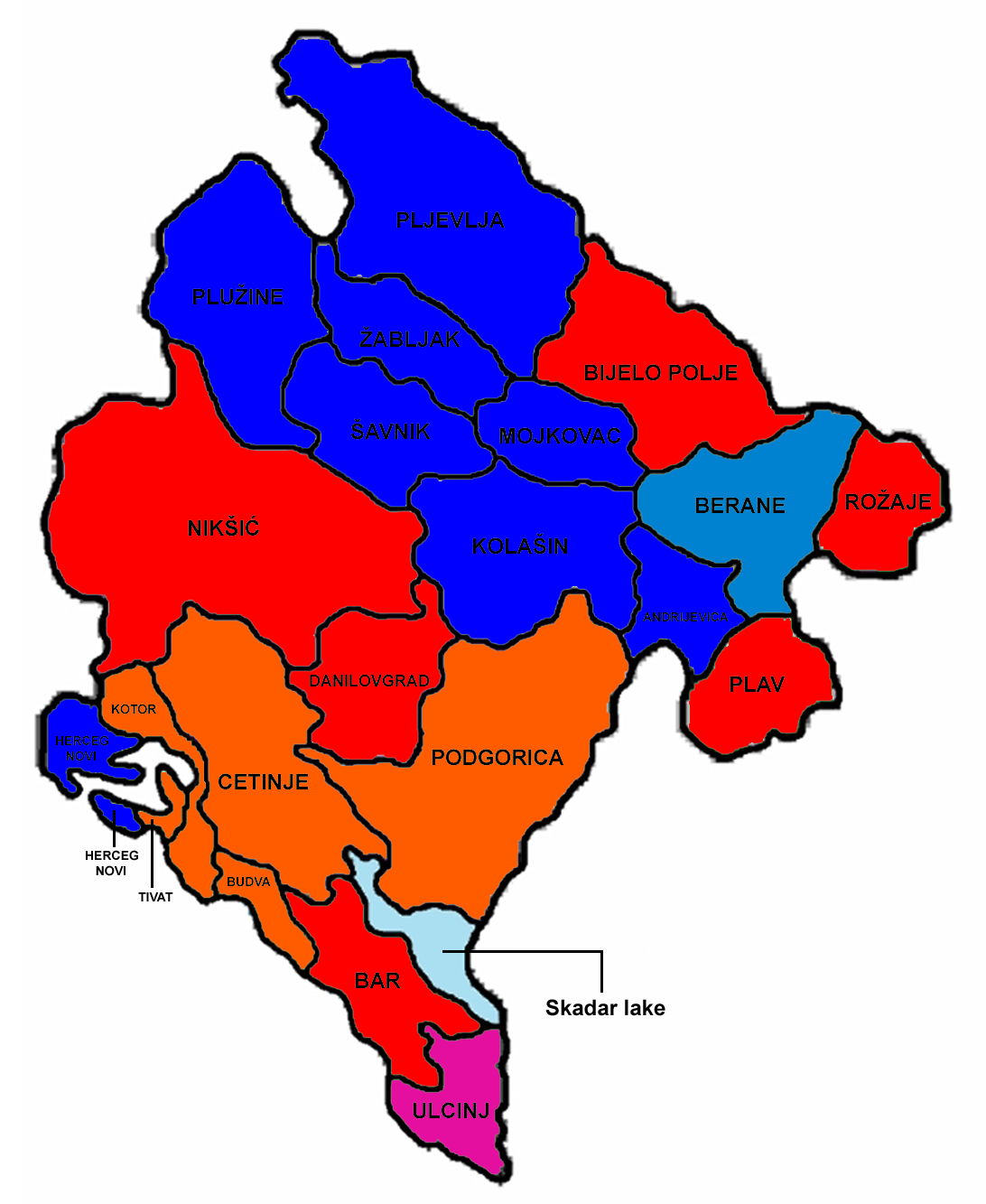
Dark Blue: absolute ZZP majority
Light Blue: relative ZZP majority
Red: DPS-SDP absolute majority
Orange: relative DPS-SDP majority
Pink: AZ relative majority
Prime Minister before	Prime Minister after
Filip Vujanović; DPS	Milo Đukanović; DPS

Parliamentary elections were held in Montenegro on 20 October 2002. The result was a victory for the For a European Montenegro alliance formed by the Democratic Party of Socialists (DPS) and the Social Democratic Party (SDP), which won 39 of the 75 seats. It was the last parliamentary election held in Montenegro prior to independence referendum in 2006.

== Electoral system ==
Of the 75 seats in Parliament, 73 were elected by proportional representation in a nationwide constituency and two were elected in a special constituency for the Albanian minority. The electoral threshold was set at 3% and seats allocated using the d'Hondt method. Closed lists were used with a single list for both constituencies, although parties only had to award half their seats according to the order of the list, with the remaining half free for them to allocate.

== Contesting parties ==
Name		Abbreviation	Ideology	Leader
European Montenegro	Democratic Party of Socialists; Demokratska partija socijalista Демократска партија социјалиста	DPS	Social democracy Separatism	Milo Đukanović
European Montenegro	Social Democratic Party; Socijaldemokratska partija Социјалдемократска партија	SDP	Social democracy Separatism	Ranko Krivokapić
Together for Change	Socialist People's Party; Socijalistička narodna partija Социјалистичка народна партија	SNP	Social conservatism Unionism	Predrag Bulatović
Together for Change	Serb People's Party; Srpska Narodna stranka Српска Народна странка	SNS	National conservatism Unionism	Andrija Mandić
Together for Change	People's Party; Narodna stranka Народна странка	NS	Cultural conservatism Unionism	Dragan Šoć
Liberal Alliance of Montenegro; Liberalni savez Crne Gore; Либерални савез Црне Горе		LSCG	Liberalism; Separatism	Miodrag Živković
Albanians Together	Democratic League in Montenegro; Demokratski savez u Crnoj Gori; Lidhja Demokratike në Mal të Zi	DS	Albanian minority interests Liberal conservativism	Mehmet Bardhi
Albanians Together	Democratic Union of Albanians; Demokratska unija Albanaca; Unioni Demokratik i Shqipëtarëve	DUA	Albanian minority interests Social conservatism	Fuad Nimani

== Results ==
Party	Votes	%	Seats	+/–
European Montenegro	167,166	47.98	39	+3
Together for Change	133,900	38.43	30	–3
Liberal Alliance of Montenegro	20,365	5.85	4	–2
Patriotic Coalition for Yugoslavia	9,920	2.85	0	0
Albanians Together	8,498	2.44	2	0
Bosniak Democratic Coalition	2,446	0.70	0	New
Socialist Party of Yugoslavia with Communists	2,242	0.64	0	New
Bosniak Coalition	2,173	0.62	0	New
Party of Savings and Social Security	851	0.24	0	0
SRS	837	0.24	0	New
Total	348,398	100.00	75	–2
Valid votes	348,398	98.67		
Invalid/blank votes	4,704	1.33		
Total votes	353,102	100.00		
Registered voters/turnout	455,791	77.47		
Source: Slavic-Eurasian Research Centre
