= People's Concord of Montenegro =

People's Concord of Montenegro Народна слога Црне Горе Narodna sloga Crne Gore
- Founder: Novak Kilibarda
- Founded: 2000
- Dissolved: 2006
- Split from: People's Party
- Headquarters: Podgorica
- Ideology: Centrism; Liberal conservatism Montenegrin nationalism
- Political position: Centre-right
- National affiliation: European Montenegro (2001–2006)

People's Concord of Montenegro or Popular Unity of Montenegro (Montenegrin: Narodna sloga Crne Gore / Народна слога Црне Горе, NSCG) was a minor centrist political party in Montenegro. Its founder and president was Montenegrin activist Novak Kilibarda.

It was created after Novak Kilibarda, president of the notable People's Party of Montenegro, abandoned the main pursuits and the political ideology and created a small, his own, party. It was named to emulate national unity of the Montenegrins and the "Popular Unity" coalition that Kilibarda headed between the People's Party of Montenegro and the Liberal Alliance of Montenegro. The main difference is that the People's Party, which was in the Victory is of Montenegro coalition under Milo Đukanović, decided to go back into the opposition because of the problems that came out regarding proposals of an independent Montenegro - NS CG was strictly pro-Serbian. President Novak left the leadership and with several prominent people founded in 2001 the People's Concord of Montenegro that continued to support Milo, and attained a pro-Montenegrin attitude. NS CG was taken over by a moderate leadership that reduced the fiercely nationalist Serbian ideologies spread from the party while it was under Novak.

NSCG never achieved greater support. On the 2001 parliamentary election it won below 0.1% votes and failed to surpass the census. In 2002 it joined DPS-led coalition, List for a European Montenegro, but NSCG received no seat in the parliament. For a compensation, in 2003 it received one seat in the newly formed Parliament of Serbia and Montenegro. It was also notable as a contestant in the pro-independendist bloc during the 2006 independence referendum that won.
