= 2000 Yugoslavian general election =

- 24 September 2000
- Presidential election
- Turnout: 71.53%
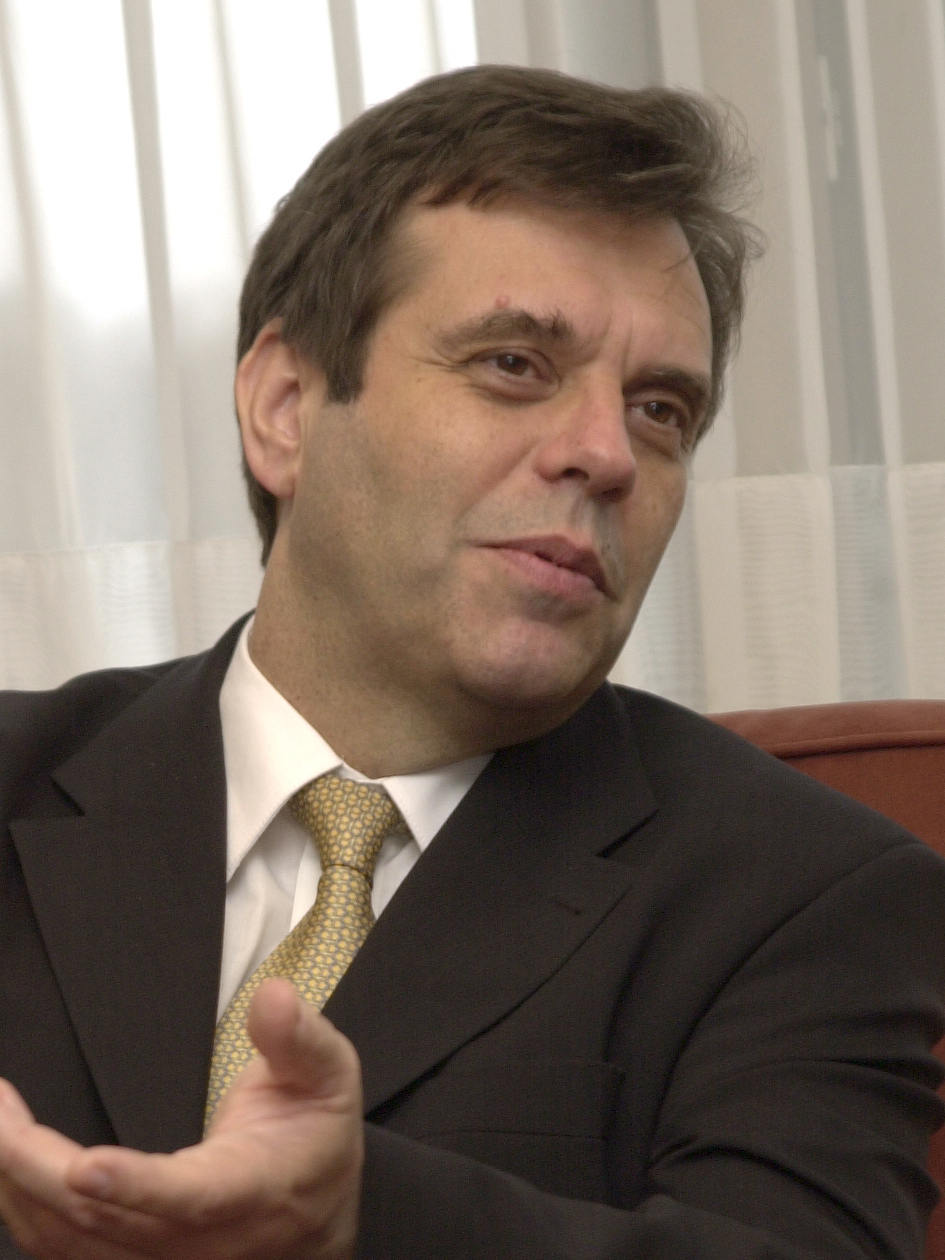

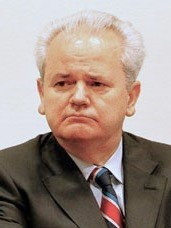

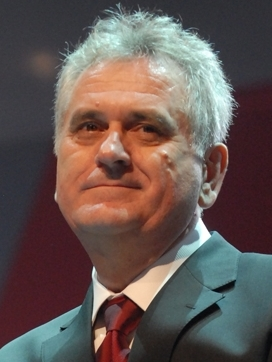
Candidate	Vojislav Koštunica	Slobodan Milošević	Tomislav Nikolić
Party	DSS	SPS	SRS
Alliance	DOS	SPS–JUL–SNP
Popular vote	2,470,304	1,826,799	289,013
Percentage	51.71%	38.24%	6.05%
- Results by district Koštunica: 40–50% 50–60% 60–70% 70–80% Milošević: 40–50% 50–60% 70–80%
President before election
Slobodan Milošević
SPS
Elected President
Vojislav Koštunica
DSS
Milošević resigns on 7 October 2000
- Parliamentary election
Party	Leader	Vote %	Seats
Chamber of Citizens
DOS	Vojislav Koštunica	43.86	58
SPS	Slobodan Milošević	32.95	44
SRS	Vojislav Šešelj	8.75	5
SNP	Momir Bulatović	2.24	28
VMSZ	József Kasza	1.03	1
SNS	Božidar Bojović	0.17	2
Chamber of Republics
DOS	Vojislav Koštunica	44.99	10
SPS–JUL	Slobodan Milošević	31.81	7
SRS	Vojislav Šešelj	10.17	2
SPO	Vuk Drašković	6.04	1
SNP	Momir Bulatović	2.22	19
SNS	Božidar Bojović	0.20	1
This lists parties that won seats. See the complete results below.
Prime Minister before	Prime Minister after
Momir Bulatović; SNP	Zoran Žižić; SNP

General elections were held in the Federal Republic of Yugoslavia on 24 September 2000. They included the presidential election, which was held using the two-round system, with a second round scheduled for 8 October. After the first round, the Federal Electoral Commission announced that Vojislav Koštunica of the Democratic Opposition of Serbia (DOS) was just short of the majority of all votes cast needed to avoid a runoff against the runner-up and incumbent president Slobodan Milošević. However, the DOS coalition claimed that Koštunica had received 52.54% of the vote. This led to open conflict between the opposition and government. The opposition organised demonstrations in Belgrade on 5 October 2000, after which Milošević resigned on 7 October and conceded the presidency to Koštunica. Subsequently released revised election results showed Koštunica with slightly over 51% of all votes cast.

In the Federal Assembly elections, DOS emerged as the largest faction in the Chamber of Citizens, whilst the Socialist People's Party of Montenegro won the most seats in the Chamber of Republics. The elections were boycotted by the ruling coalition of Montenegro, led by the Democratic Party of Socialists.

== Background ==
In the summer immediately following the NATO bombing of Yugoslavia, opposition parties began discussing who could run as a united opposition candidate in the upcoming elections. In a meeting in Budva that summer, Branislav Kovačević and Nenad Čanak proposed that Ivan Stambolić run for president with the backing of a multi-party coalition. After the formal establishment of the DOS coalition, Stambolić met with Kovačević on several occasions.

Several events occurred during the spring before the election that significantly contributed to a politically volatile environment; on 13 May 2000, the Chairman of the Executive Council of Vojvodina, Boško Perošević, was assassinated. Following his assassination, the Yugoslav Left announced it would propose a Law on the Defense of the State, which was scheduled to be assessed by the Parliament on 23 May 2000. Meanwhile, state-affiliated news outlets accused the opposition of the terrorism and subservience to NATO. The law was never passed through the Parliament.

In June 2000, Stambolić told Kovačević that he would run as the DOS candidate as long as the coalition parties approved of his candidacy, and that he run face-to-face against Milošević as opposed to a different SPS candidate.

On 6 July 2000, the parliament amended the constitution of Yugoslavia such that the president would no longer be selected by the Parliament, but would be directly elected instead. He also announced that the presidential and local elections in September would be held simultaneously; the constitution gave the president of Yugoslavia a four-year term, but Milošević organised presidential elections a year before his mandate expired.

On 25 August 2000, Stambolić disappeared. Witnesses said that he had been kidnapped and "thrown into a white van" after walking from Košutnjak to a local restaurant. Meanwhile, the DOS coalition formally endorsed Koštunica's candidacy. Dragan Maršićanin claimed that "voters were looking for someone who was a supporter of democracy but also a proven patriot and a nationalist in the kindest sense", and expressed his opinion that Koštunica had the closest such profile.

The Yugoslav economy was struggling at the time of the elections; only a year after the NATO bombing campaign, many of the international sanctions remained in place, and inflation was over 100%. In the winter before the elections, the European Union sent heating fuel to the cities of Niš and Pirot, which were governed by opposition parties. Political scientist Michael Parenti asserted that the EU was ultimately denying such shipments to the remainder of Yugoslavia, offering humanitarian aid only to towns which were not governed by the ruling parties.

Kosovo Albanians did not vote, but they rooted Milošević's victory, hoping that it would lead to the further disintegration of Yugoslavia. This along with voter fraud and strong Kosovo Serb support allowed Milošević to win an absolute majority in Kosovo.

== Presidential candidates ==
Candidate	Party
Slobodan Milošević	Socialist Party of Serbia-Yugoslav Left coalition
Vojislav Koštunica	Democratic Opposition of Serbia
Tomislav Nikolić	Serbian Radical Party
Vojislav Mihailović	Serbian Renewal Movement
Miodrag Vidojković	Affirmative Party

== Campaign ==
The DOS coalition asked the Serbian Renewal Movement to pull Vojislav Mihailović out of the race and to endorse their candidate, but Mihailović and his party refused. However, he added that if he were not to make it into a second round, that he would support Koštunica over Milošević in a runoff.

"...we are really in the state where we are hostages--not only because of Milošević but because of some specific decisions in American policy which I do not understand entirely."

— Vojislav Koštunica, August 2000

Koštunica officially began his campaign in the Braničevo District on 30 August 2000. On 2 September, he officially submitted his candidacy to the Federal Electoral Commission. Over the course of his campaign, he emphasised that he would seek the removal of international sanctions on Yugoslavia, return the country to international institutions such as the United Nations, and solve conflicts between the constituent republics of Serbia and Montenegro. Although Milo Đukanović supported Stambolić's bid for the DOS candidacy, he refused to support Koštunica and boycotted the election entirely. Likewise, Vuk Drašković also refused to endorse him.

Furthermore, Koštunica occasionally differed from the rest of the DOS coalition, such as in his criticism of the International Criminal Tribunal for the former Yugoslavia. He stated that "there are many things about the Hague tribunal that are more about politics than law", adding that Milošević's indictment would not necessarily be a priority if he were elected.

=== Involvement of the United States ===
In October 1999, the National Democratic Institute hosted a conference at the Marriott Hotel in Budapest, inviting activists from the Serbian opposition. In the conference, Douglas Schoen advised opposition activists to campaign in a united coalition. At the conference, activists were shown an opinion poll commissioned by Penn, Schoen & Berland Associates, depicting Koštunica with a greater probability of beating Milošević in an election than that of Zoran Đinđić. Koštunica's critical stance on the United States was also significant, as he and his party, Democratic Party of Serbia, categorically rejected US financial support. In spite of this, Koštunica was an inevitable beneficiary of US support, witting or not, as other parties associated with either the DOS coalition or the Otpor! movement received a sum of $41 million in financial support from the United States from 1999 to 2000. USAID provided 5,000 spray cans for anti-Milošević graffiti and the printing of 2.5 million stickers with the message "Gotov je", or "He's finished". The United States also paid for the training of electoral monitors in Szeged, Hungary, and subsequently paid monitors $5 each after the election.

On 15 August 2000, the United States Department of State announced the opening of an office of Yugoslav affairs within the US embassy in Budapest. The Department of State added that the office "will consist of State Department and [USAID] officials and will work to support the full range of democratic forces in Serbia". The office's budget and specific role was not disclosed by diplomats at the time. Koštunica, already under attack by accusations of collaborating with foreign powers, called the office "the kiss of death".

=== Disputed elections in Kosovo ===
Despite Kosovo being under UNMIK administration, Yugoslavia went ahead with preparations for the federal elections on 24 September 2000. Following changes to electoral law in July, Kosovo was included in the southern Serbian districts of Vranje and Prokuplje. According to a CIA report from September 2000, around two-thirds of the 1,512,501 registered voters in these districts were believed to live in Kosovo, most of them ethnic Albanians. Belgrade had also arranged for around 80,000 Kosovo Serb refugees in Serbia to vote.

UNMIK chief Bernard Kouchner allowed the elections to take place, but refused to assist Belgrade in organising them. Kosovo Albanian leaders Ibrahim Rugova (LDK) and Hashim Thaçi (PDK) both rejected the legitimacy of the elections. Meanwhile, Kosovo Serbs were divided, with some political representatives calling for a boycott while others supported opposition candidate Vojislav Koštunica.

== Results ==
=== President ===
After polling stations closed on 24 September, multiple parties and authorities reported extremely contradicting results. In a conference for journalists only a few hours after polling stations closed, Nikola Šainović initially announced that Milošević was leading with 50% to Koštunica's 31% of first round votes. On 25 September, the DOS coalition as well as the Serbian Radical Party and Serbian Renewal Movement announced that Koštunica won as much as 55% of the first round vote. The Federal Electoral Commission did not issue any statement until 26 September, when they announced that Koštunica had an eight-point lead in the first round, but did not record the required 50% of all votes cast to avoid a runoff vote. Electoral documents were subsequently incinerated. When Đinđić announced that his party, on the basis of votes counted in 98.5% of polling stations, that there was a discrepancy of 400,000 votes between his party's records and that of the Federal Electoral Commission, demonstrations ensued throughout multiple cities in Serbia.

Candidate	Party	28 September figures		10 October figures	
Candidate	Party	Votes	%	Votes	%
Vojislav Koštunica	Democratic Opposition of Serbia	2,474,392	50.38	2,470,304	51.71
Slobodan Milošević	SPS–JUL–SNP	1,951,761	39.74	1,826,799	38.24
Tomislav Nikolić	Serbian Radical Party	292,759	5.96	289,013	6.05
Vojislav Mihailović	Serbian Renewal Movement	146,585	2.98	145,019	3.04
Miodrag Vidojković	Affirmative Party	46,421	0.95	45,964	0.96
Total		4,911,918	100.00	4,777,099	100.00
Valid votes		4,911,918	97.32	4,777,099	97.19
Invalid/blank votes		135,371	2.68	137,991	2.81
Total votes		5,047,289	100.00	4,915,090	100.00
Registered voters/turnout		7,249,831	69.62	6,871,595	71.53
Source: CESID, IFES

=== Chamber of Citizens ===
Party	Votes	%	Seats
Democratic Opposition of Serbia	2,040,646	43.86	58
Socialist Party of Serbia	1,532,841	32.95	44
Serbian Radical Party	406,196	8.73	5
Serbian Renewal Movement	238,343	5.12	0
Socialist People's Party of Montenegro	104,198	2.24	28
Alliance of Vojvodina Hungarians	47,768	1.03	1
List for Sandžak	35,821	0.77	0
New Communist Party of Yugoslavia	35,742	0.77	0
Democratic Party of Vojvodina Hungarians	35,585	0.76	0
Radical Party of the Left	35,107	0.75	0
Party of Serbian Unity	33,680	0.72	0
Radical Party of Serbia	22,829	0.49	0
Workers' Movement – Radovan Radović Raka	12,192	0.26	0
Serb People's Party	8,048	0.17	2
Alliance of Citizens of Subotica – Vojvodina Opposition	7,176	0.15	0
Sandžak People's Movement Coalition	6,574	0.14	0
For a Richer and More Beautiful Serbia	6,282	0.14	0
Sandžak People's Movement Coalition – Džemail Suljević	5,265	0.11	0
Yugoslav Communists	5,105	0.11	0
Vojvodina for Yugoslavia Coalition	4,614	0.10	0
DEMOS – Movement for Europe	4,182	0.09	0
Alliance for Peace	3,603	0.08	0
Natural Law Party – Branko Čičić	2,977	0.06	0
Ecology Party of Vojvodina	2,888	0.06	0
Radomir Pavlović – Sisevac	2,380	0.05	0
Alliance of Communists of Yugoslavia in Serbia – Communists of Subotica	2,278	0.05	0
Alliance for Peace (Kosovo Democratic Initiative–Albanian Reform Party)	2,212	0.05	0
Radicals of Serbia	2,054	0.04	0
Yugoslav Communist Alliance – Montenegro Communists	1,946	0.04	0
Yugoslav Left of Montenegro	1,627	0.03	0
Natural Law Party – Jozef Viola	1,260	0.03	0
Foreign Currency Savers Party	964	0.02	0
Total	4,652,383	100.00	138
Valid votes	4,652,383	95.64	
Invalid/blank votes	211,981	4.36	
Total votes	4,864,364	100.00	
Registered voters/turnout	6,830,464	71.22	
Source: CESID

=== Chamber of Republics ===
Party	Votes	%	Seats
Serbia
Democratic Opposition of Serbia (Note: One of the Democratic Opposition of Serbia's seats in the Chamber of Republics was assigned to Esad Džudžević of the List for Sandžak, due to a pre-election agreement.)	2,092,799	46.23	10
Socialist Party of Serbia–Yugoslav Left	1,479,583	32.68	7
Serbian Radical Party	472,820	10.44	2
Serbian Renewal Movement	281,153	6.21	1
Natural Law Party	102,062	2.25	0
Radical Party of the Left	98,822	2.18	0
Total	4,527,239	100.00	20
Valid votes	4,527,239	95.24	
Invalid/blank votes	226,108	4.76	
Total votes	4,753,347	100.00	
Registered voters/turnout	6,395,862	74.32	
Montenegro
Socialist People's Party of Montenegro	103,425	83.28	19
Serb People's Party	9,494	7.64	1
Serbian Radical Party	5,586	4.50	0
Yugoslav Left	1,928	1.55	0
Yugoslav Communist Alliance	1,243	1.00	0
Foreign Currency Savers Party	1,025	0.83	0
Yugoslav Communists	797	0.64	0
Serb Party	698	0.56	0
Total	124,196	100.00	20
Valid votes	124,196	98.38	
Invalid/blank votes	2,043	1.62	
Total votes	126,239	100.00	
Registered voters/turnout	437,876	28.83	
Source: CESID
