= Potpeće =

Potpeće may refer to:

- Potpeće, Foča, Bosnia and Herzegovina
- Potpeće, Pljevlja, Montenegro
- Potpeće (Užice), Serbia
