= ZZP =

ZZP may refer to:

- Alliance for Primorska (Zveza za Primorsko), an extraparliamentary party in Slovenia
- Together for Change (Zajedno za Promjene), a Montenegrin political party
- Zelfstandigen zonder personeel (Self-employed individual); see Economy of the Netherlands § Labour market and social welfare
- Zjednoczenie Zawodowe Polskie (Polish Professional Union), the Polish labour union formed to resist the Germanisation of Poland during the early 20th century

== See also ==
- KZZP, a commercial FM radio station
