= Novak Kilibarda =

Montenegrin politician and professor (1934–2023)

- Новак Килибарда

Deputy Prime Minister of Montenegro
- In office 16 July 1998 – 4 July 2000
- Prime Minister: Filip Vujanović
- Preceded by: Predrag Drecun
- Succeeded by: Savo Đurđevac

Member of Parliament
- In office 9 December 1990 – 16 July 1998
- President: Risto Vukčević; Svetozar Marović

Personal details
- Born: 7 January 1934 Tupan, Yugoslavia
- Died: 23 May 2023 (aged 89) Montenegro
- Party: NS CG (2000–2006); NS (1990–2000); SK CG (1954–1971)
- Education: University of Belgrade
- Profession: Professor, politician

Novak Kilibarda, PhD (Cyrillic: Новак Килибарда; 7 January 1934 – 23 May 2023) was a Montenegrin politician, professor, literary historian and writer.

== Early life and education ==
Kilibarda was born on 7 January 1934 in the village of Tupan in Banjani, Nikšić. His father Gavrilo was a farmer, his mother Plana (née Vukalović) was a housewife. He attended elementary school in the village of Velimlje and high school in Nikšić.

Kilibarda graduated from the University of Belgrade Faculty of Philology in 1958, with a degree in Yugoslav literature. After graduating, he taught at the Višegrad Gymnasium from 1959 to 1961. He became a magister in 1964, and completed his doctorate in 1969 with the topic Bogoljub Petranović as a Collector of Folk Songs ("Bogoljub Petranović kao sakupljač narodnih pesama").

Kilibarda taught at the Pedagogical Academy from 1963, even serving as its director. The school was later to become the Faculty of Philosophy, and was merged with the Veljko Vlahović University.

== Political career ==
Kilibarda entered politics very early on, climbing into several ranks of the League of Communists of Montenegro, including the position of MP in the Parliament of the SR Montenegro. After writing the foreword to the book Anegdote i priče iz Crne Gore ("Anecdotes and Stories from Montenegro") by Obrad Višnjić, which included a song glorifying Krsto Zrnov Popović, he was expelled from all positions in the League of Communists and in the state apparatus in 1971. He was also replaced from the position of Director of the Pedagogical Academy. High-ranking official Veljko Milatović was against firing him from the position of professor altogether and prevented it from happening. During this period, he acquired a strong anti-communist position and Serb nationalist attitude.

In the late 1980s, Serbian nationalist movements were strengthening in SR Montenegro. In 1990, with the arrival of multi-party politics, Montenegrin intellectuals gathered around Novak Kilibarda and formed the People's Party (NS). The party claimed heritage from the early 20th century People's Party, which had been active in the Kingdom of Montenegro.

Kilibarda became a fierce opponent of Slobodan Milošević, claiming Milošević was working against national interests. He and the leader of the Liberal Alliance of Montenegro, Slavko Perović, formed a coalition called Popular Unity. Later, he joined the DPS and SDP in Đukanović's For a Better Life coalition in 1997, supporting ousting Bulatović and Milošević's supporters. He was part of the Đukanović government from 1998 to 2000. Because of this, Kilibarda lost support from Serbian nationalists who were against cooperation with the DPS, many of whom left the party to form the Serb People's Party. Further moderating his views and having been disappointed by the Serbs' losses in the Yugoslav Wars, Kilibarda gradually turned to Montenegrin nationalism. He published brochures in opposition to Serb-conducted war crimes and pleaded for forgiveness from Croatia and Bosnia for his previous actions. An outspoken supporter of the breakup of the state union with Serbia, he was ousted from the NS in 2000 when the party withdrew from its coalition with the DPS. Forming close relations with writer and academician Jevrem Brković and his Doclean Academy of Sciences and Arts, he attained the view that Montenegrins were a unique nation and not Serbs. In the run-up to the 2006 independence referendum, he was a proponent of the independence bloc.

Kilibarda died on 23 May 2023, at the age of 89.

== Positions held ==
Political offices
Preceded by Predrag Drecun	Deputy Prime Minister of Montenegro; 1998–2000	Succeeded by Savo Đurđevac
Preceded by Ljubiša Stanković	Leader of the Opposition; 1991–1998	Succeeded by Momir Bulatović
Party political offices
New political party	President of the People's Concord; 2000–2006	Succeeded by Position abolished
New political party	President of the People's Party; 1990–2000	Succeeded by Dragan Šoć
