= Momir Vojvodić =

Montenegrin Serb poet

Momir Vojvodić (Serbian Cyrillic: Момир Војводић; 18 February 1939 – 10 March 2014) was a Montenegrin Serb poet and politician.

Born in 1939 in Ponoševac, near Đakovica, in Metohija, Vojvodić and his family were expelled from their village by the Bali Kombëtar and fled to Montenegro as refugees. He finished middle school in Gornja Morača and Morača Monastery, high school in Nikšić and Peć and then graduated at the Faculty of Philology, University of Belgrade. He worked as a professor of Serbian language and literature in high schools in Podgorica and was one of the founders of the People's Party, member of the Parliament of Montenegro and the Parliament of FR Yugoslavia.

He died on 10 March 2014 in Podgorica at the age of 75.

== Poetry ==
- Tragovi (1970)
- Nadolaženje praha (1971)
- Miris mrtvih trava (1972)
- Starostavnik (1974)
- Groboslovi (1979)
- Nasamo s kamenom (1981)
- Groboslovi roda kurjačkog (1981)
- Sa izvora mojih gora (Aus den quellen meiner Berge), in German and Serbian (West Berlin, 1981)
- Lađa u kamenici (1982)
- Putnik sa tisovim štapom (1983)
- Grad nad oblakom (1984)
- Glas vučje gore (1985)
- Muke s ušima (1986)
- Prolistala štula (1987)
- Čuvar divljih riječi (1987)
- Azbučna molitva (1988)
- Zemlje jezik (1991)
- Davni glasnik (1993)

=== Anthologies and poem selections ===
- Žertveno polje Kosovo (1389 – 1989), poem anthology about Kosovo (1989)
- Sa izvora čarnih gora (1989)
