= Džemail Suljević =

Serbian politician

Džemail Suljević (Serbian Cyrillic: Џемаил Суљевић; born 1948) is a politician and political activist in Serbia from the country's Bosniak community. An advocate for the autonomy of the Sandžak region and the Bosniak people, he was the mayor of Sjenica from 1996 to 2000 and served in the National Assembly of Serbia from 1997 to 2001. He was initially a member of the Party of Democratic Action of Sandžak (Stranka demokratske akcije Sandžaka, SDA) and later became the leader of the breakaway Sandžak People's Movement (Narodni pokret Sandžaka, NPS).

== Early life and private career ==
Suljević was born in the village of Aliveroviće in the municipality of Sjenica, in what was then the People's Republic of Serbia in the Federal People's Republic of Yugoslavia. He graduated from the Faculty of Architecture in Skopje (then in the Socialist Republic of Macedonia) and took post-graduate studies in Sarajevo (then in the Socialist Republic of Bosnia and Herzegovina). He is a professional architect.

== Politician ==
=== Party of Democratic Action ===
Suljević joined the SDA after the return of multi-party politics to Serbia in 1990.

In 1991, the Bosniak National Council of the Sandžak organized a referendum on the autonomy of the region in which the "Yes" side won a landslide victory. (The Serbian government did not recognize the vote as legitimate.) Suljević has frequently cited this vote as affirming this autonomous status of the Sandžak region and has rejected efforts to identify the Bosniak community as simply one among many national minority groups in Serbia. He represented both the SDA and the national council in Turkey from 1993 to 1996.

The SDA contested the 1996 Yugoslavian parliamentary election and the concurrent 1996 Serbian local elections at the head of the List for Sandžak alliance. Suljević received the lead position on the group's electoral list for Užice in the Yugoslavian election; the list did not win any mandates in the district, and he was not elected. He was, however, elected to the Sjenica municipal assembly in the local elections; the SDA won a majority of seats in the municipality, and he was chosen afterward as its mayor. According to a 2010 article in Danas, he resigned from this role in early 2000.

Suljević also received the first position on the electoral list of the List for Sandžak in Užice in the 1997 Serbian parliamentary election and was elected when it won a single mandate in the division. He served in the national assembly as an opposition member. In February 1999, he accused Serbian state media of refusing to cover speeches by himself and fellow SDA member Fevzija Murić.

He indicated his intention to resign from the Serbian parliament in April 2000, citing multiple instances of the assembly president denying him the right to speak. Ultimately, though, he did not stand down.

=== Sandžak People's Movement ===
Suljević left the SDA and became a co-founder of the Sandžak People's Movement in August 2000; shortly thereafter, he was chosen as leader of the latter organization. He appeared in the lead position on the party's list for the Užice division in the 2000 Yugoslavian parliamentary election; the list did not win any mandates, and he was again not elected. He was not a candidate in the 2000 Serbian parliamentary election and his term formally ended in January 2001.

He strongly opposed Yugoslavia's law on the protection of ethnic minorities in 2002 on the grounds that it did not provide special recognition for the Bosniak people. He was quoted as saying, "This law is perhaps acceptable for Ruthenians, Bulgarians, or Romani, but it completely unacceptable for us. Earlier on, we were a people recognized by the constitution, and what kind of act is this that makes us an ethnic minority? Those who accept the implementation of this law are betraying the Bosniak people." In the same period, he described Yugoslav Minister of Human and Minority Rights Rasim Ljajić as "a representative of Serbian parties" and not an authentic representative of the Bosniak community.

Suljević argued in April 2002 that the Sandžak should become a separate federal unit in a reconstituted successor state to the Federal Republic of Yugoslavia. He strongly opposed Montenegro's push for independence in the mid-2000s on the grounds that it would divide the territory of the Sandžak, and in early 2006 he helped to convene a congress of Bosniaks advocating for the preservation of a federal state. These efforts were ultimately not successful, and Montenegro declared independence later in 2006 (with the support of most members of its Bosniak community).

In 2009, Suljević accused the Serbian government of attempting to divide the Sandžak with a new proposed law on regional development. He was quoted as saying, "Even though we are now in the twenty-first century, the Greater Serbia policy has no intention of relinquishing the further break up and carve up on Sandžak."

He called for a boycott of the 2010 elections for the Bosniak National Council, saying that the council's terms placed Serbia's Bosniak community on the level of an ethnic minority. He subsequently worked to re-establish the Sandžak National Council, with the stated aim of representing Bosniaks in both Serbia and Montenegro. In September 2011, he was named as the leader of the latter organization.

Representatives of other Bosniak parties were often very critical of Suljević's political activities by the late 2000s, accusing him of pursuing divisive, outdated, and unrealistic goals and describing his party as having become as a fringe presence in the region. In 2010, Meho Omerović of the Sandžak Democratic Party (Sandžačka demokratska partija, SDP) described Suljević's views on Sandžak unity as "a very dangerous fairy tale" and accused him of pursuing a strategy that was ultimately detrimental to the community.

Suljević was aligned with Muamer Zukorlić's political movement in 2010. He withdrew his support from the pro-Zukorlić Bosniak Democratic Union (Bošnjačka demokratska zajednica, BDZ) in 2012, however, on the grounds that it had represented itself as national minority party in Serbia's local elections.

He has largely withdrawn from the politics of Serbia and the Sandžak since 2012.
