= František Lipka =

Slovak diplomat, poet and translator

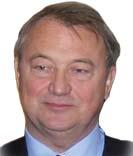
- Born: 22 February 1946 (age 80); Bratislava, Slovakia (then Czechoslovakia)
- Occupations: diplomat, poet and translator

František Lipka (born 22 February 1946 in Bratislava, Czechoslovakia) is a Slovak diplomat, poet and translator, who contributed to the process of the creation of independent Montenegro.

== Life ==
Lipka studied Slovak and the Serbo-Croatian language at the School of Philosophy of the Comenius University in Bratislava (1969). He worked as an external editor of the World Literature Revue magazine, cooperated with magazines "Smena na nedeľu" (Sunday Smena), "Mladá tvorba" (Young Creation), "Slovenské pohľady" (Slovak Views), Romboid; he alternated between posts as a lecturer of the Slovak language and literature at the University of Novi Sad School of Philosophy and at the Comenius University in Bratislava, lecturing on the history of Serbian and Croatian literature. He is also active as a sommelier and since 1994 Lipka has been serving as the President of the International Jury for the Bestowment of the International Vine and Wine Organization awards (Organisation Internationale de la Vigne et du Vin), headquartered in Paris.

== Poetry ==
He began working with poetry during his university studies, with a debut of sensitive and reflexive lyric poetry "Štvanica" (Hunt). His poetry is characterized by a rational attitude, striving to penetrate national and humankind's universal history, bringing back motives from ancient history with the objective of understanding the presence of humankind in its contemporary social, cultural and ecological environment. His statements often carry a super-personal aspect, creates an impression of an intellectual and analytical cognition of reality.

== Translations ==
František Lipka is also an important translator of Serbian, Croatian, Slovenian and Macedonian literature. He has published an anthology of poetry works of Bosnia and Herzegovina, redacted an anthology of Serbian poetry of the 20th century, an anthology of contemporary Macedonian poetry, and prepared an anthology of poetry by contemporary Slovak poets living in the territory of the former Yugoslavia. He published a book for children, "Farebné rozprávky" (Colorful Tales).

== Works ==
Poetry

- Štvanica (Hunt) (1970)
- Jazero (The Lake) (1976)
- Zem na jazyku (Earth on the Tongue) (1978)
- Orfeus na bicykli (Cycling Orpheus) (1980)
- Argonauti (Argonauts) (1981)
- Útek z obrazu (Fleeing the Picture) (1984)
- Rozprava o metóde (Discourse on the Method) (1989)

Children's books

- Farebné rozprávky (Colorful Tales) (1969)

Anthologies

- Sarajevská jar (Spring in Sarajevo) (1970, anthology of poetry from Bosnia and Herzegovina)
- Zápisy v striebre mora (Written in the Silver Sea) (1988, anthology of the 20th century Serbian poetry)
- Nepokoj v krajine (Unrest in the Country) (1990, anthology of contemporary Macedonian poetry)
- Súčasne (Contemporary) (1990, anthology of poetry by contemporary Slovak poets living in the territory of the former Yugoslavia)

Wine

- Praktický sprievodca slovenskými vínami (Practical Guide of Slovak Wines) (2006)

== Diplomatic career ==
Since the end of the 1980s, he has been active in diplomacy. He served as an ambassador of Slovakia in France, Belgium and Luxembourg. In 2006 Lipka became the Referendum Commission President (Chairman of the Electoral Commission) for the Montenegrin independence referendum and was in charge of supervision over the course of the referendum, its results and a safeguard of the adherence to correct and valid election processes. On 22 May 2006, he announced that the preliminary results of the referendum were 55.4% in favour of independence, thus meeting the previously set independence requirement in the form of a supermajority threshold of 55% in favour.
