= Albanians Together =

Albanians Together (Serbian: Албанци заједно, Albanci zajedno) was an Albanian political alliance in Montenegro.

== History ==
The alliance was formed by the Democratic Union of Albanians and the Democratic League in Montenegro and the Party of Democratic Prosperity, and contested the 2002 parliamentary elections under the banner "Democratic Coalition – Albanians Together". It received 2.4% of the national vote, winning two seats. It took around half of the votes reserved for Albanian seats, including 46.8% of the vote in Ulcinj.
