= Sandžak People's Movement =

Serbian political party

The Sandžak People's Movement, otherwise known in English as the People's Movement of Sandžak (Serbian: Народни покрет Санџака, romanized: Narodni pokret Sandžaka, abbr. NPS), is a Serbian political party representing the country's Bosniak community. Throughout its existence, the party has been led by Džemail Suljević.

The NPS supports autonomy for Serbia's Bosniak community in the Sandžak and rejects the status of Bosniaks as merely one of many national minorities within Serbia. In a 2010 interview, Suljević said, "The position of the Sandžak People's Movement [...] is that Bosniaks are a people and not a minority. [...] Bosniaks in Sandžak are an autochthonous people, they have everything that other peoples have: culture, tradition, religion. In terms of status, our advocacy is the Constitution, which will certainly be changed, and in which it should be stated that Bosniaks are the constituent and state-forming people in Serbia."

== Original appearance in 2000 ==
In its original form, the Sandžak People's Movement was a coalition of several different Bosniak parties in Serbia. Rasim Ljajić first announced the impending formation of the coalition in mid-2000, although as events transpired he was not part of its founding. The original constituent members of the NPS on 22 August 2000 were the National Congress of Bosniaks of Yugoslavia, the Democratic Party of Sandžak, the Liberal Bosniak Organization, the League of Social Democrats of Sandžak and the Reform Democratic Party of Sandžak. (Note: According to the Serbian ministry for state administration and local self-government, the Sandžak People's Movement was founded on 17 October 1999. It is possible that one of the original constituent parties of the NPS was founded on this date and changed its name to the Sandžak People's Movement in 2000, effectively giving over its party registration.) Ljajić initially sought to maintain some connection with the NPS, noting that one of the founding parties (i.e., the League of Social Democrats of Sandžak) was also part of his own Sandžak Coalition. Ultimately, however, neither he nor the Sandžak Coalition joined the NPS.

Suljević was chosen as the coalition's leader on or shortly after its founding. At the time, he was a sitting member of the Serbian national assembly, having been elected for Sulejman Ugljanin's List for Sandžak in the 1997 Serbian parliamentary election. Under Suljević's leadership, the party articulated an autonomist ideology.

The NPS contested the 2000 Yugoslavian parliamentary election in the divisions of Kraljevo and Užice, winning 6,574 votes (4.13%) in the former constituency and 5,265 votes (2.84%) in the latter. It did not win any seats. Suljević was the lead candidate on the party's electoral list in Užice; unusually, the party appeared on the ballot as "Coalition 'Sandžak People's Movement'–Džemail Suljević" in Užice but simply as "Coalition 'Sandžak People's Movement'" in Kraljevo.

In the concurrent 2000 Serbian local elections, the NPS won 5,023 votes (14.87%) but no seats in Novi Pazar, 2,161 votes (15.88%) but no seats in Tutin, and 2,377 votes (15.36%) and three seats in Suljević's home community of Sjenica. The List for Sandžak won a majority victory in the latter jurisdiction, and the NPS members served in opposition.

== Since 2000 ==
The Sandžak People's Movement effectively ceased to be a political coalition after the 2000 elections and became a unified party under Suljević's leadership.

Suljević opposed Yugoslavia's law on the protection of ethnic minorities in 2002 on the grounds that it did not provide special recognition for the Bosniak people. He was quoted as saying, "This law is perhaps acceptable for Ruthenians, Bulgarians, or Romani, but it completely unacceptable for us. Earlier on, we were a people recognized by the constitution, and what kind of act is this that makes us an ethnic minority?" In the same year, he argued that the Sandžak should become a separate federal unit in a reconstituted successor state to the Federal Republic of Yugoslavia.

The NPS contested the 2004 Serbian local elections in Novi Pazar, Tutin, and Sjenica. It fared extremely poorly in Novi Pazar, receiving only 67 votes (0.20%) despite running a slate of forty-two candidates. In Tutin, however, it won 681 votes (4.72%) and two seats, while in Sjenica it won 2,348 votes (18.27%) and eight seats, finishing a credible third. Ugljanin's Party of Democratic Action of Sandžak (SDA) won a majority victory in Tutin, but no party won overall control in Sjenica, and the NPS was put in a kingmaker position in that municipality. It initially joined a coalition government led by the SDA, but this broke down in a matter of weeks. Subsequently, it joined a new administration led by Ljajić's Sandžak Democratic Party (SDP).

Suljević strongly opposed Montenegro's push for independence in the mid-2000s on the grounds that it would divide the territory of the Sandžak, and in early 2006 he helped to convene a congress of Bosniaks advocating for the preservation of a federal Yugoslavian state. These efforts were ultimately not successful, and Montenegro declared independence in June 2006, with the support of most members of its Bosniak community. At around the same time, the Sjenica municipal assembly was dissolved for early elections. Online accounts do not clarify if the NPS won any seats in the repeated vote.

In March 2008, the NPS formed a new coalition called the "European Movement of Sandžak" to contest the 2008 Serbian local elections. The coalition won 185 votes (0.39%) and no seats in Novi Pazar and 1,087 votes (8.51%) and three seats in Sjenica. In Tutin, a different coalition involving the NPS won 397 votes (2.26%) and no seats.

Suljević called for a boycott of the 2010 elections for the Bosniak National Council on the grounds that the council's terms placed Serbia's Bosniak community on the level of an ethnic minority. He subsequently worked to re-establish the Sandžak National Council, with the stated aim of having it represent Bosniaks in both Serbia and Montenegro. Representatives of other Bosniak parties were often very critical of Suljević by this period, accusing him of pursuing unrealistic goals and describing his party as having become as a fringe presence in the region.

Suljević became aligned with Muamer Zukorlić's political movement in 2010. He withdrew support from the pro-Zukorlić Bosniak Democratic Union (BDZ) in the buildup to the 2012 Serbian local elections, however, on the grounds that it had registered as a national minority party. The NPS only fielded a slate in Sjenica for the 2012 local elections, receiving 228 votes (1.52%) and no seats.

Although the NPS has apparently not participated in any elections since 2012, it remains a registered political party in Serbia as of May 2026, and Suljević remains its leader.
