= Popular Unity (Montenegro) =

Popular Unity Народна Слога Narodna Sloga
- Leader: Novak Kilibarda; Slavko Perović
- Founded: 1996
- Dissolved: 1998
- Headquarters: Podgorica
- Political position: Big tent
- Colours: blue and yellow
- Parliament (1996): 19 / 71

Popular Unity (Montenegrin and Serbian: Narodna Sloga/Народна Слога) was a big tent opposition political alliance in Montenegro. The alliance was formed by two major opposition parties in Montenegro at time, the People's Party (NS) and Liberal Alliance of Montenegro (LSCG), prior to the 1996 parliamentary election. Slavko Perović's idea for the alliance was that it would open the way for "reconciliation between Montenegrins and Montenegrin Serbs". Kilibarda's party was Serbian nationalist. The main goal of the alliance was to overthrow the ruling Democratic Party of Socialists (DPS) of president Momir Bulatović, which has been in power since introduction of multi-party system. The coalition of liberals and populists won 24.91% of votes and gained only 19 MPs, 11 of which belonged to NS and 8 to LSCG. However, LSCG terminated the coalition after the decision of NS to enter into coalition with the ruling DPS.

== Member parties ==
| Party name | Abbr. | Leader | Ideology | Seats before | Change | Seats won |
|---|---|---|---|---|---|---|
| People's Party; Narodna stranka Народна странка | NS | Novak Kilibarda | Conservatism; Populism | 14 / 71 | ▼3 | 11 / 71 |
| Liberal Alliance; Liberalni savez Либерални савез | LSCG | Slavko Perović | Liberalism; Pacifism | 13 / 71 | ▼5 | 8 / 71 |

== Elections ==
=== Parliamentary election ===
Parliament of Montenegro
| Year | Popular vote | % of popular vote | Seats before | Seat change | Overall seats won | Government |
|---|---|---|---|---|---|---|
| 1996 | 74,963 | 24.91% | 27 / 71 | ▼8 | 19 / 71 | opposition |
