= Together for Change =

Together for Change Заједно за Промјене Zajedno za Promjene
- Leader: Predrag Bulatović
- Founded: 2001; 25 years ago
- Dissolved: 2006; 20 years ago
- Headquarters: Podgorica
- Ideology: Populism; Unionism
- Political position: Right-wing

Together for Change (Serbian: Заједно за Промјене, ЗЗП, Zajedno za Promjene, ZZP) was a populist political alliance in Montenegro that existed from 2001 to 2006, originally known as Together for Yugoslavia (ЗЗЈ, ZZJ). It based itself upon the necessity for a united Yugoslav state with Serbia. Predrag Bulatović was its wingleader. The pro-European semi-conservative coalition also based itself on economic and democratic reforms, bringing down of the authoritarian regime of Prime Minister Milo Đukanović and his Democratic Party of Socialists.

== History ==
=== Formation ===
The political alliance merged after a drastic change within the Socialist People's Party of Montenegro. With Slobodan Milošević and his SPS defeated in Serbia and him on trial at the Hague, SNP CG lost its main financial supplier and room was made for the democratic wing under Predrag Bulatovic to come to prominence. The party had purged in 2001 its entire old pro-Milošević leadership, with its new president Predrag Bulatović deliberately voting for the removal of most members of the party who had close or intimate links with either Slobodan Milošević or its already by then former leader Momir Bulatović. The party adopted a new pro-European program and pointed out that it is capable of conducting real lustration in order to make a final brake with the policies of the 1990s, unlike the Democratic Party of Socialists of Montenegro which saw only a change in political ideology, but with precisely the same men from the reign of Slobodan Milošević gathered around Milo Đukanović. Breaking ties with parties belonging to the old regime, it ended the For Yugoslavia short-lived pro-Milošević political alliance, with Momir Bulatovic's People's Socialist Party taking charge over it and transforming it into the Patriotic Coalition for Yugoslavia. SNP CG however kept only the Serbian People's Party of Montenegro at its side, although putting it at hard pressure to replace its old leadership that represented unpopular characters from the 1990s and change its fiercely Serbian nationalistic pursuits. As a result, the party became more moderate with Andrija Mandić as its new president. Emphasizing the need to emulate DPS from 1998 with its broad anti-Milošević coalition, SNP searched to form a broad anti-Đukanović coalition on the very basis to gather all political forces that wanted to maintain the Federal Republic of Yugoslavia, unlike ruling Milo's coalition which desired an independent Montenegrin state. The People's Party of Montenegro under the new leadership of Predrag had abandoned Milo's coalition because of its disappointment in Milo's promises of reforms and ideological differences over Montenegro's independence proposing and had aligned with SNP. Thus SNP CG made the Together for Yugoslavia (Заједно за Југославију) alliance with Serb People's Party (SNS) and the People's Party of Montenegro (NS CG).

=== 2001 elections ===
The 2001 Montenegrin parliamentary election saw practically just two choices: this SNP-led alliance and Milo's Victory is of Montenegro coalition, both very large coalition of strong potential. Both sides tried to get the Liberal Alliance of Montenegro at its side, but ZZJ didn't do it because LSCG's frontline goal was an independent Montenegrin state, the very thing this alliance is opposing as its mainstream policy. ZZJ was also at very bad relations with LSCG already because of SNP's past - LSCG opposed Milošević ever since its creation in 1990, and has never joined DPS despite they too changed their political ideology.

The coalition won the 2001 parliamentary election in Montenegro under the name Together for Yugoslavia with 148,513 votes or 40.87% and 33 seats (21 for SNP CG, 9 for NS CG and 3 for SrNS CG), but failed to form a government.

=== 2002 elections ===
At the legislative elections in Montenegro, on 21 October 2002, the coalition won 38.4% (133,900 votes) of the popular vote and 30 of 75 seats (19 for SNP CG, 6 for SrNS CG and 5 for NS CG). It had represented the entire opposition force in Montenegro, and was a strong proponent of union with Serbia. The union became more dis-unified after the DSS CG seceded from SNS CG in 2003 (taking 2 of SNS' 6 MPs in the Parliament).

=== 2006 referendum ===
The pro-Yugoslavian Alliance's last major political movement was during the 2006 Montenegrin independence referendum, when it made the Unionist Bloc supporting the NO option for independence. They got 185,002 votes, or 44.51% of the total vote, losing the referendum. However the referendum was highly and deeply controversial, so the Bloc never really accepted its results. After the independence referendum the Alliance was demolished, the Serbian People's Party left, forming a Serb-centric alliance, while SNP, NS and DSS ran as a coalition on the 2006 Montenegrin parliamentary election. With the poor outcome of the coalition - winning only 11 seats, despite huge promises and all the expectations that this election would be final Đukanović's fall - the unofficial leader of the Yugoslavist bloc Predrag Bulatović resigned from political leadership and SNP distanced itself from NS and DSS, ending the last fringes of the once huge alliance.

== Elections ==
=== Parliamentary elections ===
Year	Coalition name	Popular vote	% of popular vote	Overall seats won	Seat change	Government
2001	Together for Yugoslavia	148,513	40.56%	33 / 75	▼1	opposition
2002	Together for Changes	133,894	38.4%	30 / 75	▼3	opposition

== Member parties ==
The political alliance was composed by:

Party name	Abbr.	Ideology	Leader	MPs (2003–2006)	Member
Socialist People's Party; Socijalistička narodna partija Социјалистичка народна партија	SNP	Unionism; Social conservatism Social democracy	Predrag Bulatović	19 / 75	2001–2006
People's Party; Narodna stranka Народна странка	NS	Unionism; Christian democracy Cultural conservatism	Dragan Šoć	5 / 75	2001–2006
Serb People's Party; Srpska narodna stranka Српска народна странка	SNS	Unionism; National conservatism Serbian nationalism	Andrija Mandić	4 / 75	2001–2006
Democratic Serb Party; Demokratska srpska stranka Демократска српска странка	DSS	Unionism; National conservatism Christian democracy	Božidar Bojović	2 / 75	2003–2006
