= Jovan Markuš =

- Јован Маркуш

Mayor of Cetinje
- In office 1984–1990

Personal details
- Born: 20 January 1949 (age 77) Cetinje, PR Montenegro, Yugoslavia
- Party: League of Communists of Yugoslavia (until 1990); People's Party (1990–2017)
- Children: 2

Jovan Markuš (Serbian Cyrillic: Јован Маркуш; born 20 January 1949) is a Montenegrin politician, journalist, publicist, historian and heraldist. He is the former mayor of Cetinje, Montenegro's Old Capital.

== Biography ==
Jovan Markuš graduated from the University of Belgrade Faculty of Mechanical Engineering in 1974. In the 1980s he was elected into the local assembly of the Cetinje Municipality and elected President of the local parliament, from 1984 to 1990 also serving the post of Mayor of Cetinje. Afterward from 1990 to 1994 he was the CEO of the Galenika pharmacy firm for Montenegro, and from 1994 to 1999 Director of the Federal Tolls Management.

After leaving administrational politics, he became a dedicated journalist and publicist, winning the First Prize for Publicism in 2002. Jovan Markuš had invested a lot in research in the field of heraldry and in general history to a lesser extent. He authored three books in the field and became a member of the international Committee for Honoring Royal Dignity, which he remains to this day.

In 1990 he gathered various intellectuals in reforming the old Montenegrin People's Party from the days of Montenegro's independence in the early 20th century, with the fall of Communist single-partyism, and remained honorarily its Executive Committee's Vice-president to this day.

He is the President of the Cetinje-based Serbian Cultural and Enlightenment Society of Montenegro. Jovan Markuš is also the Honorary Citizen of the city of Greenville, Michigan, United States of America. Next to Serbian, Markus also speaks Italian and French. He is married, his son Branko is a doctor and his daughter Marija is a student of the Medical Faculty of the University of Belgrade.

== Books ==
- The Return of King Nicholas I into the Fatherland (Повратак краља Николе у отаџбину)
