= Potpeće, Foča =

Potpeće
- Village
- Location within Bosnia and Herzegovina
- Coordinates: 43°28′44″N 18°52′24″E
- Country: Bosnia and Herzegovina
- Entity: Republika Srpska
- Municipality: Foča
- Time zone: UTC+1 (CET)
  - Summer (DST): UTC+2 (CEST)

Potpeće (Serbian Cyrillic: Потпеће) is a village in the municipality of Foča, Republika Srpska, Bosnia and Herzegovina.
