= Božidar Bojović =

Montenegrin chief physician (1938–2021)

- Божидар Бојовић
- Born: 1938; Potpeće, Yugoslavia
- Died: December 2021 (aged 82–83)
- Occupations: Physician; Politician

Božidar M. Bojović (Serbian Cyrillic: Божидар М. Бојовић; 1938 – 14 December 2021) was a Montenegrin chief physician, endocrinologist, and politician who was a member of the Parliament of Montenegro and representative in the legislative body of the FR Yugoslavia, between 1990 and 2005. He was also a professor at the University of Montenegro.

== Life and career ==
Bojović was born in Potpeće, Yugoslavia, in 1938.

He received his doctorate in 1980 from the University of Novi Sad's Faculty of Medicine. He worked as a doctor in Rožaje, Kotor and Podgorica. He was the professor and the founder of the Department of Pediatrics at the University of Montenegro Faculty of Medicine.

He became politically active since the introduction of multi-party system in SR Montenegro in 1990, he was one of the founders of the opposition People's Party (NS). Bojović was party vice-president since its formation until the split within the NS, prior to the 1998 parliamentary election and the pre-election coalition between the NS and the ruling DPS of Milo Đukanović. National conservative fraction of the NS led by Bojović defected from the party and formed new political subject the Serb People's Party (SNS), running independently at the election, considering that the NS and its leader Novak Kilibarda abandoned the national original aims of the party. He was the president of the SNS from 1998 until 2003. Bojović left the SNS and formed the Democratic Serb Party (DSS), after the SNS congress in mid-2003 and the split with the newly elected party president Andrija Mandić. He was president of the new party until July 2005, when he decided to retire from politics.

Bojović died in Podgorica on 14 December 2021, at the age of 83.

He has published over 250 professional and scientific papers in domestic and foreign magazines, proceedings and congresses. He authored 15 monographs and one university textbook, and was the co-author of 12 monographs and two university textbooks.
