= For Yugoslavia =

For Yugoslavia (Serbian: За Југославију/Za Jugoslaviju) was a political alliance that existed in the Republic of Montenegro from the late 1990s to 2001. It was led by Momir Bulatović's SNP and based on pro-Miloševićism. It emphasized the necessity to maintain the Federal Republic of Yugoslavia, the state union of Serbia and Montenegro.

It was composed by:

- Socialist People's Party of Montenegro (SNP)
- Yugoslav Left (JUL)
- Serb People's Party (SNS)
- Serb Radical Party (SRS)

With the purge within SNP when its entire pro-Momirist leadership left and founded the People's Socialist Party, SNP broke away from its pro-Milošević partners and formed the Together for Yugoslavia Alliance which managed to maintain a stalwart opposition.

Bulatović's supporters founded a pro-Milošević bloc known as the Patriotic Coalition for Yugoslavia that succeeded the For Yugoslavia alliance.
