= European Montenegro =

European Montenegro Evropska Crna Gora Европскa Црна Горa
- Leader: Milo Đukanović
- Founder: Milo Đukanović
- Founded: 1998
- Dissolved: 2016
- Headquarters: Podgorica
- Ideology: Catch-all alliance Social democracy Civic nationalism Montenegrin nationalism Pro-Europeanism; Liberalism; Social liberalism
- Political position: Centre to centre-left
- Colours: Red Yellow

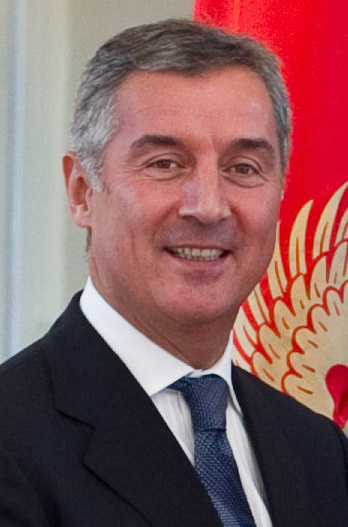
Milo Đukanović

The European Montenegro (Montenegrin: Европскa Црна Горa, Evropska Crna Gora; abbr. ECG) was the ruling political alliance in Montenegro headed by Milo Đukanović's Democratic Party of Socialists (DPS).

Following the internal turmoil within the DPS during late 1996 and early 1997 when the party's most prominent members Đukanović and Momir Bulatović bitterly fought behind the scenes for the control of the party, Đukanović emerged as the clear winner of the year-long power struggle. Under his leadership, DPS began entering pre-election alliances with smaller parties under the coalition banner that had a different name ahead of each parliamentary election. Besides the leading DPS, it was also consisted of two main political parties, the SDP and the LPCG. The coalition was formally dissolved in 2016. The first version of the coalition was formed ahead of the 1998 parliamentary elections in Montenegro under the name So that we live better (Да живимо боље/Da živimo bolje). Before the 2001 elections the coalition was rebranded as Victory is Montenegro's (Побједа је Црнe Горe/Pobjeda je Crne Gore). Then, before the 2002 elections the coalition was known as (Democratic) List for European Montenegro (Листа за европску Црну Гору/Demokratska lista za evropsku Crnu Goru), and finally before the 2006 elections it became the Coalition for European Montenegro.

== History ==
=== 1998 elections ===
In 1998 DPS forged a wide alliance in an attempt to compete with the newly created pro-Milošević Socialist People's Party of Montenegro (SNP) led at the time by former DPS leader Momir Bulatović.

Đukanović-led DPS called for an alliance between anti-Milošević parties, stating that Milošević's political pursuits were leading FR Yugoslavia into ruin. It made a coalition with the Social Democratic Party of Montenegro (SDP) that supported outright independence and the People's Party of Montenegro (NS) that wanted Montenegro to remain in a state with Serbia. DPS's own position at the time was that Montenegro and Serbia should be in a single unified state, but they opposed Milošević's rule.

The 1998 parliamentary election on May 31 essentially turned into another showdown between Đukanović and Bulatović over a single issue – Slobodan Milošević. Đukanović's coalition won, seizing 42 of 78 total parliamentary seats. Those 42 seats were then divided up three ways according to the coalition agreement: DPS received 32 seats while its coalition partners NS and SDP got 5 each.

For DPS, it meant less actual seats belonging to the party than after the previous election when they got 45 of 71 total seats alone by themselves. However, they were now ruling through a coalition, which benefited the party's image in other ways as it created a perception of openness and pluralism.

As far as SDP was concerned getting 5 seats was a remarkable success – the party entered parliament for the first time in its history and could now influence the republic's official policy, neither of which they could dream of had they entered the election alone.

From NS perspective, getting 5 seats was not a big reason for celebration since the party had a distinct voting base at the time, meaning they would've surely got more had they entered alone, but they were now in a ruling coalition, in position to influence official policy and were happy to be there as long as DPS supported the idea of a unified state with Serbia.

Though never stable and cohesive, during its first year, the government formed by the "So that we live better" coalition was able to internally agree on basic matters and reach the minimum consensus. Big political test came in March 1999 when NATO military alliance started bombing FR Yugoslavia. Despite Montenegro being spared from the heaviest bombing, SDP and even fringe parts of DPS capitalized on the bombing to aggressively push the idea of an independent Montenegrin state. This political discourse, however, never made it into any of the government's official policy. In fall 1999, initiated by Đukanović, Montenegro drafted a document called Platforma za redefiniciju odnosa Crne Gore i Srbije (A platform for redefinition of relations within the Federal Republic of Yugoslavia) and sent it to Belgrade. In an atmosphere when Đukanović–Milošević relations were strained to a maximum, the platform called for major changes in the division of governing responsibilities within FR Yugoslavia. Though still officially seeing itself within a state with Serbia, Đukanović-led Montenegro wanted many things changed and redefined.

However, after the overthrow of Slobodan Milošević in October 2000 (which many saw to be a positive sign in future relations between Montenegro and Serbia and a way to quickly repair the damaged relationship), contrary to expectations, DPS made a complete turnaround and now suddenly started pushing for complete independence thus completely abandoning the platform they wrote just a year earlier. Consequently, the mainstream of the ruling coalition started to openly support the idea of an independent Montenegro and this became an official government policy, all of which caused huge international outrage and outright opposition from the European Union.

In the resulting crisis, the pro-unity People's Party left the government dissatisfied with DPS' turnaround. Subsequently, inner quarrels between DPS CG on one side and LSCG on the other came out over filling in NS CG's vacant occupation in the government. NS subsequently joined the newly formed pro-Yugoslavian Together for Yugoslavia of Predrag Bulatović of the reformed SNP, which based itself on countering this alliance's newfound independent ideology, emphasizing the necessity of keeping the state together with Serbia. Additionally, LSCG also withdrew from the government, on the allegations that DPS was not sincere in decisions to make Montenegro independent and that it was stalling it. The rump DPS-SDP of the once greater alliance lost control over the government. New elections were scheduled in 2001.

=== 2001 elections ===
It ran on the 2001 Montenegrin parliamentary election as the "Victory is Montenegro's" (composed of the rump remains of the once large coalition; Democratic Party of Socialists and its sole partner, SDP). The coalition lost parliamentary majority, winning just 36 of 77 seats (30 for DPS and 6 for SDP). Contrary to everyone's expectation, the now opposing, once former ally, Liberal Alliance supported it to form a minority government under Filip Vujanović. But closer aligning of LSCG with the Together for Yugoslavia bloc distanced it from the minority coalition. The government signed the Belgrade Agreement in 2002, by which the Federal Republic of Yugoslavia was transformed into the State Union of Serbia and Montenegro and the Republic of Montenegro re-integrated into political structure with its great sister-republic. According to the agreement, the Deputy President of DPS Svetozar Marović became the country's first President. The frustrated pro-independence Liberal Alliance withdrew its support and crashed Vujanović's government. New elections were scheduled for 2002.

=== 2002 elections ===
As the "List for European Montenegro" (composed out of Democratic Party of Socialists of Montenegro, Social Democratic Party of Montenegro, Civic Party of Montenegro, Liberal Democratic Party and the People's Concord of Montenegro), it won the 2002 Montenegrin parliamentary election receiving 39 of 75 seats in the Parliament of the Republic of Montenegro. DPS CG received 31 seat, SDP CG 7 and GP 1. NSCG received no seat as promised, but entered the later in 2003 elected Parliament of Serbia and Montenegro with one seat as compensation. LDP because of insufficient share in the total parliament, LDP was excluded completely.

=== 2006 elections ===
In the 2006 election the alliance "For European Montenegro" won with 41 out of 81 seats. 32 seats were supposed to go DPS and 8 to SDP. The Coalition's seats were split 33 for DPS, 7 for SDP and 1 for HGI.

=== 2009 elections ===
Coalition for a European Montenegro won the absolute majority in the 2009 election. The result translates to 47 out of the 81 seats in the Parliament. The turnout among the nearly 500,000 registered voters was around 67 per cent. Milo Đukanović secured his sixth term as the Prime Minister with 50.8% of the vote.

=== 2012 elections ===
In the 2012 election this alliance is formed by DPS, SDP and the Liberal Party of Montenegro. The result of 2012 election was a victory for the ruling Coalition for a European Montenegro led by Đukanović, which won 39 of the 81 seats. Đukanović secured his seventh term as the Prime Minister with 45.60% of the vote.

=== 2016 DPS–SDP split ===
On 22 January 2016 SDP's president Ranko Krivokapić announced that SDP will leave the coalition with DPS and will support the non-confidence vote against the government of Đukanović on 25 January. Shortly after, the Liberal Party left the alliance as well but remained loyal to the DPS. In this way, after 18 years, the coalition between these three parties ended.

== Coalition members ==
Name	Abbr.	Ideology	Leader	Member
Democratic Party of Socialists; Demokratska partija socijalista Демократска партија социјалиста	DPS	Social democracy Pro-Europeanism	Milica Pejanović; Milo Đukanović	1998–2016
Social Democratic Party; Socijaldemokratska partija Социјалдемократска партија	SDP	Social democracy Pro-Europeanism	Žarko Rakčević; Ranko Krivokapić	1998–2016
Liberal Party of Montenegro; Liberalna partija Crne Gore; Либерална партија Црне Горе	LP	Liberalism; Montenegrin nationalism	Andrija Popović	2012–2016
Bosniak Party; Bošnjačka stranka Бошњачка странка	BS	Bosniak minority interests Social conservatism	Rafet Husović	2009-2012
Croatian Civic Initiative; Hrvatska građanska inicijativa Хрватска грађанска иницијатива	HGI	Croatian minority interests Conservatism	Marija Vučinović	2006–2012
Civic Party of Montenegro; Građanska partija Crne Gore; Грађанска партија Црне Горе	GP	Liberalism; Pro-Europeanism	Krsto Pavićević	2002–2006
Liberal Democrats; Liberalni Demokrati; Либерални демократи	LD	National liberalism Montenegrin nationalism	Jevrem Brković	2001–2006
People's Concord of Montenegro; Narodna sloga Crne Gore; Народна слога Црне Горе	NSCG	Liberal conservatism Sovereigntism	Novak Kilibarda	2001–2006
People's Party; Narodna stranka Народна странка	NS	Conservatism; Christian democracy	Novak Kilibarda	1998–2001

== Electoral performance ==
=== Parliamentary elections ===
Parliament of Montenegro
Year	Popular vote	% of popular vote	Overall seats won	Seat change	Government	Member parties
1998	170,080	48.87%	42 / 78	▼19	Majority	DPS-NS-SDP
2001	153,946	42.04%	36 / 77	▼6	Minority	DPS-SDP
2002	167,166	48.0%	39 / 75	▲3	Majority	DPS-SDP-GP-NSCG
2006	164,737	48.62%	41 / 81	▲2	Majority	DPS-SDP-HGI
2009	168,290	51.9%	48 / 81	▲7	Majority	DPS-SDP-HGI-BS
2012	165,380	45.60%	39 / 81	▼9	Coalition	DPS-SDP-LP

=== Presidential elections ===
President of Montenegro
Election year	Candidate	Party	#	1st round votes	% of votes	#	2nd round votes	% of votes
2003	Filip Vujanović	DPS	1st	139,574	64.2%	—N/a	—	—
2008	Filip Vujanović	DPS	1st	171,118	51.89%	—N/a	—	—
2013	Filip Vujanović	DPS	1st	161,940	51.21%	—N/a	—	—

== See also ==
- Accession of Montenegro to the European Union
