= Potpeće, Pljevlja =

Potpeće Потпеће
- Village
- Location within Montenegro
- Country: Montenegro
- Municipality: Pljevlja

Population (2011)
  - Total: 113
- Time zone: UTC+1 (CET)
  - Summer (DST): UTC+2 (CEST)

Potpeće (Serbian Cyrillic: Потпеће) is a village in the municipality of Pljevlja, Montenegro.

== Demographics ==
According to the 2003 census, the village had a population of 122 people.

According to the 2011 census, its population was 113.

Ethnicity in 2011
| Ethnicity | Number | Percentage |
|---|---|---|
| Serbs | 63 | 55.8% |
| Bosniaks | 10 | 8.8% |
| Montenegrins | 8 | 7.1% |
| other/undeclared | 32 | 28.3% |
| Total | 113 | 100% |
