= Dragan Šoć =

Serbian-Montenegrin jurist and politician (born 1957)

Dragan Šoć (Serbian Cyrillic: Драган Шоћ; born 1957 in Cetinje, SR Montenegro, SFR Yugoslavia) is a Montenegrin lawyer, retired politician and former Minister of Justice in the Government of Montenegro, from 1998 until 2000. Šoć was one of the founders of conservative People's Party (NS) in 1990, and former party president between 2000 and 2006, he also served as the People's Party representative in the Parliament of Montenegro from 1990 to 1998, and again from 2001 until 2009. During the Montenegrin independence referendum in May 2006, he was one of the leaders of the unionist bloc, which advocated Montenegro's remaining in the state union with Serbia. He is currently active as lawyer and member of the legal team of the Metropolitanate of Montenegro and the Littoral and Serbian Orthodox Church in Montenegro.
