= People's Party (Montenegro, 1990) =

People's Party Narodna stranka Народна странка
- Founder: Novak Kilibarda
- Founded: 1990
- Dissolved: 2021
- Headquarters: Podgorica
- Ideology: Cultural conservatism Serb ethnic interests Serbian–Montenegrin unionism Christian democracy
- Political position: Centre-right to right-wing
- Religion: Serbian Orthodox Church
- National affiliation: European Montenegro (1998–2001)
- European affiliation: European Christian Political Movement (ECPM)
- Anthem: Onamo, 'namo!

Website
- www.narodnastranka.com

The People's Party (Serbian: Народна странка, romanized: Narodna Stranka, abbreviated НС/NS) was a conservative political party in Montenegro.

== History ==
The party was established in 1990, after a multi-party system was introduced in Montenegro, and was named after the historical People's Party. Notable party founders include Novak Kilibarda, Matija Bećković, Božidar Bojović, Pavle Milić, Jovan Markuš, Dragan Šoć, Momir Vojvodić and Bogoljub Šijaković.

The People's Party opposed Slobodan Milošević's regime in Serbia and his supporters in Montenegro during the 1990s. It joined DPS and SDP in 1998 election, and it participated in Government with the two until 2001. But, when DPS and SDP openly stated that they are proponents of full Montenegrin independence. People's Party of Montenegro left the coalition and the Government. Afterwards, it was mostly in coalition with pro-union with Serbia parties. After the referendum, the People's Party refused to acknowledge the result due to allegations of irregularities. After failing to achieve parliamentary status in 2009 and 2012 elections, People's Party activity significantly decreased, but it remained formally active until its dissolution in 2017.

== Elections ==
Parliament of Montenegro
Year	Popular vote	% of popular vote	Overall seats won	Seat change	Coalition	Government
1990	39,146	12.84%	13 / 125	Steady	—	opposition
1992	37,549	12.71%	14 / 71	▲1	—	opposition
1996	74,963	24.91%	11 / 71	▼3	LSCG	opposition
1998	170,080	48.87%	5 / 78	▼6	ECG	government
2001	148,513	40.56%	9 / 77	▲4	ZZJ	opposition
2002	133,900	38.4%	5 / 75	▼4	ZZP	opposition
2006	47,683	14.07%	2 / 81	▼3	SNP-DSS	opposition
2009	9,448	2.86%	0 / 81	▼2	DSS	non-parliamentary
2012	5,275	1.45%	0 / 81	Steady	SL-DCB	non-parliamentary

== Party leadership ==
- Novak Kilibarda, 1990–2000
- Dragan Šoć, 2000–2006
- Predrag Popović, 2006–2021
- Jovan Markuš, 2011–2016^{[acting]}
