= Predrag Bulatović =

Montenegrin politician

Predrag Bulatović Предраг Булатовић
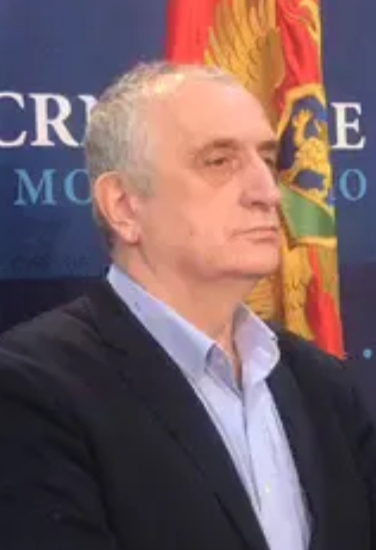
- Predrag Bulatović in December 2019

Member of Parliament of Montenegro
- Incumbent
- Assumed office 3 November 1996

President of the Socialist People's Party
- In office 24 September 2000 – 26 November 2006
- Preceded by: Momir Bulatović
- Succeeded by: Srđan Milić

Personal details
- Born: 16 July 1956 (age 70) Kolašin, PR Montenegro, Yugoslavia
- Party: DNP (since 2012)
- Other political affiliations: SKCG (until 1991); DPS (1991–1997); SNP (1997–2012)
- Education: Veljko Vlahović University
- Profession: Politician

Predrag Bulatović (Serbian Cyrillic: Предраг Булатовић; born 16 July 1956) is a Montenegrin politician, current member of the Parliament of Montenegro and vice-president of the Democratic People's Party since the party's founding in March 2015. Bulatović is also a member of the presidency of the Democratic Front alliance.

== Political career ==
=== Leader of the opposition ===
As the former member of the League of Communists of Montenegro, Predrag Bulatović was a founding member of the Democratic Party of Socialists. Bulatović served as a member of the Parliament of Montenegro for several terms, since 1996. He was a high-ranking member of the Socialist People's Party, since party founding prior the 1997 split from the Democratic Party of Socialists. Predrag Bulatović led SNP as party president from 2001 to 2006. Since 2001, he was leader of Montenegrin opposition, as the president of the SNP and as unofficial leader of the major opposition bloc Together for Changes. During the Montenegrin independence referendum in 2006, he was most important leader of the unionist bloc, which advocated Montenegro's remaining in the state union with Serbia.

=== After the 2006 referendum ===
After the poor result in the 2006 Montenegrin parliamentary election, when the number of seats won by SNP's coalition fell from 30 down to 11, Bulatović resigned from the position of party's president, along with the three vice presidents. In 2015, he became one of the founders of the Democratic People's Party, when the faction of the Socialist People's Party of Montenegro defected from the political party, and joined the Democratic Front coalition. In 2012, he was one of the founders of the political coalition Democratic Front, since 2015 he has been a member of the presidency of the coalition.
