= List of political parties in Montenegro =

This article lists political parties in Montenegro.

Montenegro has a multi-party system with numerous political parties, in which no one party often has a chance of gaining power alone, and parties must work with each other to form coalition governments.

== Current parties ==
=== Parties represented in the Parliament of Montenegro ===
Name	Abbr.	Ideology	Leader	MPs
Europe Now! Evropa sad! Европа сад!	PES	Economic liberalism; Anti-corruption; Pro-Europeanism	Milojko Spajić	20 / 81
Democratic Party of Socialists; Demokratska partija socijalista Демократска партија социјалиста	DPS	Populism; Montenegrin nationalism; Neoliberalism	Danijel Živković	17 / 81
New Serb Democracy; Nova srpska demokratija Нова српска демократија	NSD	Serbian nationalism; National conservatism; Russophilia	Andrija Mandić	9 / 81
Democratic Montenegro; Demokratska Crna Gora; Демократска Црна Гора	DCG	Catch-all party; Conservative liberalism; Pro-Europeanism	Aleksa Bečić	7 / 81
Bosniak Party; Bošnjačka stranka Бошњачка странка	BS	Bosniak minority interests; Social conservatism; Pro-Europeanism	Ervin Ibrahimović	6 / 81
Democratic People's Party; Demokratska narodna partija Демократска народна партија	DNP	Populism; Serbian nationalism; Social conservatism	Milan Knežević	4 / 81
United Reform Action; Ujedinjena reformska akcija Уједињена реформска акција	URA	Populism; Green politics Pro-Europeanism	Dritan Abazović	4 / 81
Social Democrats; Socijaldemokrate Crne Gore; Социјалдемократе Црне Горе	SD	Social democracy; Populism; Pro-Europeanism	Damir Šehović	3 / 81
Socialist People's Party; Socijalistička narodna partija Социјалистичка народна партија	SNP	Social conservatism; Social democracy; Pro-Europeanism	Vladimir Joković	2 / 81
Albanian Alternative; Alternativa Shqiptare; Albanska alternativa	ASh/AA	Albanian minority interests; Social conservatism; National conservatism	Nik Gjeloshaj	2 / 81
United Montenegro; Ujedinjena Crna Gora; Уједињена Црна Гора	UCG	Cultural conservatism; National conservatism; Ethnic Serb interests	Goran Danilović	1 / 81
Citizens' Union "Civis"; Savez građana "Civis"; Савез грађана "Цивис"	Civis	Liberalism; Technocracy; Pro-Europeanism	Srđan Pavićević	1 / 81
Democratic Party; Partia Demokratike; Demokratska partija	PD/DP	Albanian minority interests; National conservatism; Pro-Europeanism	Fatmir Gjeka	1 / 81
New Democratic Force; Forca e Re Demokratike; Nova demokratska snaga	FORCA	Albanian minority interests; Conservatism; Pro-Europeanism	Nazif Cungu	1 / 81
Democratic Union of Albanians; Demokratska unija Albanaca; Unioni Demokratik i Shqipëtarëve	UDSh/DUA	Albanian minority interests; Social conservatism	Mehmet Zenka	1 / 81
Croatian Civic Initiative; Hrvatska građanska inicijativa Хрватска грађанска иницијатива	HGI	Croatian minority interests; Social conservatism; Pro-Europeanism	Adrian Vuksanović	1 / 81

=== Parties without seats ===
Name	Abbr.	Ideology	Leader
Social Democratic Party; Socijaldemokratska partija Социјалдемократска партија	SDP	Montenegrin nationalism; Social democracy; Pro-Europeanism	Ivan Vujović
Christian Democratic Movement; Demohrišćanski pokret Демохришћански покрет	DP, DHP	Christian democracy; Ethnic Serb interests; Pro-Europeanism	Dejan Vukšić
Croatian Reform Party; Hrvatska reformska stranka Хрватска pеформска странка	HRS	Croatian minority interests; Centrism; Pro-Europeanism	Marija Vučinović
Democratic League in Montenegro; Demokratski savez u Crnoj Gori; Lidhja Demokratike në Mal të Zi	LDMZ/DS	Liberal conservativism; Albanian minority interests	Mehmet Bardhi
Democratic Party of Unity; Demokratska stranka jedinstva Демократска странка јединства	DSJ	Serbian–Montenegrin unionism; National conservatism; Russophilia	Zoran Žižić
Democratic Roma Party; Demokratska partija Roma; Демократска партија Рома	DPR	Romani minority interests; Pro-Europeanism	Mensur Šaljaj
Democratic Serb Party; Demokratska srpska stranka Демократска српска странка	DSS	Conservatism; Christian democracy; Ethnic Serb interests	Dragica Perović
DEMOS; ДЕМОС	DEMOS	Liberal conservatism; Pro-Europeanism	Miodrag Lekić
Free Montenegro; Slobodna Crna Gora; Слободна Црнa Горa	SCG	Serbian nationalism; Right-wing populism; Social conservatism	Vladislav Dajković
Justice and Reconciliation Party; Stranka pravde i pomirenja Странка правде и помирења	SPP	Bosniak minority interests; Social conservatism	Hazbija Kalač
Liberal Party of Montenegro; Liberalna partija Crne Gore; Либерална партија Црне Горе	LP	National liberalism; Montenegrin nationalism; Pro-Europeanism	Andrija Popović
Montenegrin European Party; Crnogorska evropska partija Црногорска европска партија	CEP	Montenegrin nationalism; Pro-Europeanism	Novak Adžić
Movement for Changes; Pokret za promjene Покрет за промјене	PzP	Right-wing populism; Conspiracy theorism; Hard euroscepticism	Nebojša Medojević
New Left; Nova ljevica Нова љевица	NL	Social liberalism; Montenegrin nationalism	Saša Mijović
Party of European Progress; Stranka evropskog progresa Странка европског прогреса	SEP	Pro-Europeanism	Duško Marković
Party of Montenegrin Muslims; Partija crnogorskih Muslimana; Партија црногорских муслимана	PCM	Muslim minority interests; Pro-Europeanism	Hazbija Skenderović
Party of United Pensioners and the Disabled; Partija ujedinjenih penzionera i invalida Партија уједињених пензионера и инвалида	PUPI	Rights of pensioners; Social justice	Momir Joksimović
Patriotic Komitas Union of Montenegro; Patriotsko-komitski savez Crne Gore; Патриотско-комитски савез Црне Горе	PKS	Montenegrin nationalism; Atlanticism; Right-wing populism	Tatjana Knežević
Turnaround; Preokret; Преокрет	PP	Green politics; Progressivism; Pro-Europeanism	Srđan Perić
"Svetosavska" Serb List "Svetosavska" Srpska lista "Светосавска" Српска листа	SSL	Serbian nationalism; Right-wing populism; Russophilia	Dobrilo Dedeić
Yugoslav Communist Party; Jugoslovenska komunistička partija Југословенска комунистичка партија	JKP	Communism; Yugoslavism	Radislav Stanišić
Serbian Radical Party; Srpska radikalna stranka Српска радикална странка	SRS	Serbian ultranationalism; Russophilia	Ilija Darmanović

== Historical and defunct parties ==
Name	Abbr.	Ideology	Founder	Years active
People's Party; Narodna stranka Народна странка	NS, Klubaši	National conservatism; Serbian–Montenegrin unionism; Pan-Slavism	Šako Petrović-Njegoš	1906–1918
True People's Party; Prava narodna stranka Права народна странка	PNS, Pravaši	Conservativism Royalism; Montenegrin statism	Lazar Mijušković	1907–1918
People's Radical Party; Narodna radikalna stranka Народна радикална странка	NRS	Conservatism; Serbian nationalism; Centralisation	Gavrilo Cerović	1918–1941
Democratic Party; Demokratska stranka Демократска странка	DS	Liberal conservatism; Yugoslavism; Centralisation	Andrija Radović	1918–1941
Montenegrin Federalist Party; Crnogorska federalistička stranka Црногорска федералистичка странка	CFS	Montenegrin nationalism; Federalism; Agrarianism	Sekula Drljević	1923–1945
League of Communists; Savez komunista Crne Gore; Савез комуниста Црне Горе	SKCG	Marxism-Leninism; Titoism; Anti-nationalism	Blažo Jovanović	1943–1991
Union of Reform Forces; Savez reformskih snaga Савез реформских снага	SRSJ	Social liberalism; Social democracy; Anti-nationalism	Ljubiša Stanković	1990–1991
Party of Democratic Action; Stranka demokratske akcije Странка демократске акције	SDA	Social conservatism Sandžak regionalism Yugoslav unionism	Harun Hadžić	1990–1998
Liberal Alliance of Montenegro; Liberalni savez Crne Gore; Либерални савез Црне Горе	LSCG	Liberalism; Sovereigntism; Pacifism	Slavko Perović	1990–2005
People's Party; Narodna stranka Народна странка	NS	Serbian–Montenegrin unionism; Cultural conservatism; Christian democracy	Novak Kilibarda	1990–2017
Party of Serb Radicals; Stranka srpskih radikala Странка српских радикала	SSR	Serb nationalism; National conservatism; Right-wing populism	Duško Sekulić	1992–2020
Yugoslav Left; Jugoslovenska levica Југословенска левица	JUL	Left-wing populism; Yugoslavism; Serbian nationalism	Jovanka Mijanović	1994–2001
Serb Party of the Fatherland; Отаџбинска српска странка Otadžbinska srpska stranka	OSS	National conservatism; Serbian nationalism; Serbian–Montenegrin unionism	Aleksandar Stamatović	1994–2013
Natural Law Party of Montenegro; Stranka prirodnog zakona Странка природног закона	SPZ	Transcendental meditation; Green politics	Milo Radulović	1996–2003
Serb People's Party; Srpska narodna stranka Српска народна странка	SNS	Serb nationalism; National conservatism	Božidar Bojović	1998–2009
People's Concord of Montenegro; Narodna sloga Crne Gore; Народна слога Црне Горе	NS CG	Moderate conservatism; Montenegrin independence	Novak Kilibarda	2000–2006
Liberal Democrats; Liberalni Demokrati; Либерални демократи	LD	National liberalism; Conservative liberalism; Sovereigntism	Jevrem Brković	2001–2006
People's Socialist Party; Narodna socijalistička stranka Народна социјалистичка странка	NSS	Democratic socialism; Serbian–Montenegrin unionism	Momir Bulatović	2001–2009
Greens of Montenegro; Zeleni Crne Gore; Зелени Црне Горе	ZCG	Green politics; Pro-Europeanism	Dragan Hajduković	2002–2007
Civic Party of Montenegro; Građanska partija Crne Gore; Грађанска партија Црне Горе	GP	Liberalism; Civic nationalism; Pro-Europeanism	Krsto Pavićević	2002–2017
Party of Democratic Prosperity; Partija demokratskog prosperiteta Partia e prosperitet demokratik	PDP	Albanian minority interests; Conservativism	Ali Rexha	2006–2014
Democratic Party of Unity; Demokratska stranka jedinstva Демократска странка јединства	DSJ	Serbian–Montenegrin unionism; National conservatism; Russophilia	Zoran Žižić	2006–2020
Democratic Centre of Boka; Demokratski centar Boke; Демократски центар Боке	DCB	Regionalism; Serb nationalism	Dejan Ćorović	2008–2017
Democratic Centre of Montenegro; Demokratski centar Crne Gore; Демократски центар Црне Горе	DC	Centrism; Liberalism; Pro-Europeanism	Goran Batrićević	2009–2014
Positive Montenegro; Pozitivna Crna Gora; Позитивна Црна Гора	PCG	Social liberalism; Pro-Europeanism	Darko Pajović	2012–2020
Montenegrin Democratic Union; Crnogorska demokratska unija Црногорскa демократскa унијa	CDU, CG	Economic liberalism; Montenegrin nationalism	Miodrag Vlahović	2015–2021
True Montenegro; Prava Crna Gora; Права Црна Горa	PCG	Right-wing populism; Conservatism; Serbian nationalism	Marko Milačić	2018-2025
Workers' Party; Radnička partija Радничка партија	RP	Social conservatism; Populism; Cultural conservatism	Maksim Vučinić	2015-2025

== See also ==
- Politics of Montenegro
- Parliament of Montenegro
- List of political parties by country
- Elections in Montenegro
