= 2008–2010 Montenegrin municipal elections =

2008-10 Montenegrin municipal elections
- April 2008 - October 2010
Party	DPS	SNP	DUA
Mayors	17 / 21	3 / 21	1 / 21
Mayors +/-	▲3	▼3	Steady
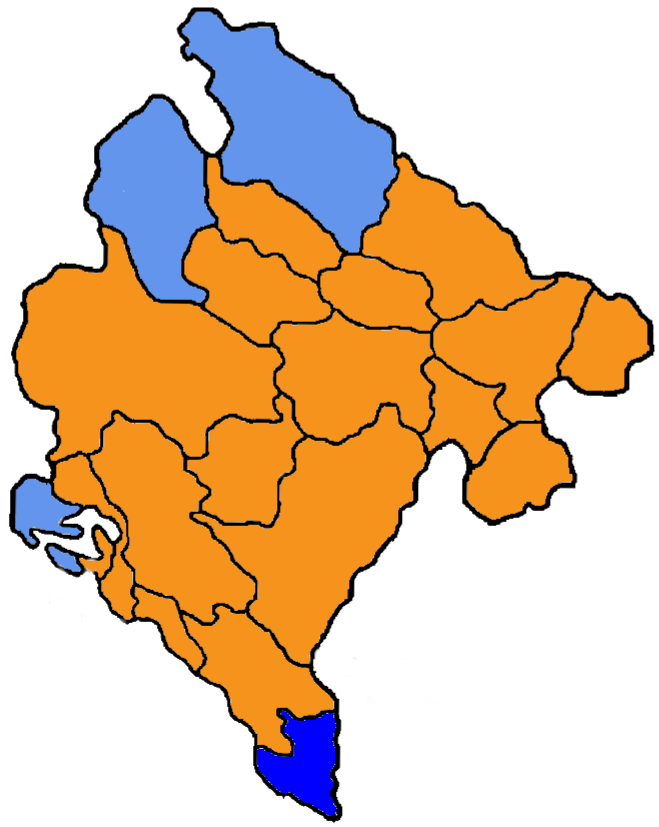
- Mayoral seats

Montenegrin municipal elections were held in all 21 municipalities, between April 2004 and October 2006. It resulted in the decisive victory of the ruling Coalition for European Montenegro in 18 out of 21 municipalities, where he has secured a majority, on its own or in a coalition with national minority parties.

== Results ==
=== Podgorica ===
Party	Votes	Seats
Coalition for European Podgorica	43.372	28
A Better Podgorica	38.279	24
Social Democratic Party	8.758	5

The local government was formed after an agreement between ruling Coalition for European Podgorica (composed by Democratic Party of Socialists, the Liberal Party and Bosniak Party), which was a relative winner of the election and Social Democratic Party which ran independently. Current mayor Miomir Mugoša (DPS) has been voted a new four-year mandate.

=== Herceg Novi ===
17,039 or 68.4% of eligible voters voted. 16,649 of the votes are valid and 390 invalid.

Party	Votes	%	Seats
Socialist People's Party	5,151	30.94%	12
Democratic Party of Socialists	4,540	27.27%	11
Serb List	2,425	14.56%	5
Movement for Changes	1,526	9.17%	3
Social Democratic Party	997	5.99%	2
People's Party	692	4.16%	1
Democratic Centre of Boka	620	3.72%	1
Democratic Serb Party	374	2.25%	1
Coalition Liberal Party-Civic Party	324	1.95%	0

=== Tivat ===
The turnout was 65.2% or 7,062. There were 6,938 valid and 124 invalid votes.

Party	Votes	%	Seats
Democratic Party of Socialists	2,209	31.84%	12
Coalition Serb List (SNS-NSS-SSR-DSJ)	1,025	14.77%	5
Social Democratic Party	773	11.14%	4
Movement for Changes	690	9.94%	3
Croatian Civic Initiative	676	9.74%	3
Socialist People's Party	518	7.47%	2
Liberal Party	324	4.67%	1
People's Party	303	4.37%	1
Democratic Serb Party	297	4.28%	1
Montenegrin Democratic Movement	123	1.77%	0

=== Kotor ===
Party	Votes	%	Seats
Democratic Party of Socialists	4,607	40.81%	14
Socialist People's Party	2,159	19.12%	7
Coalition Serb List (SNS-SSR-NSS-DSJ-DCB-DSS)	1,305	11.56%	4
Social Democratic Party	1,083	9.59%	3
Liberal Party	787	6.97%	2
Movement for Changes	533	4.72%	1
People's Party	439	3.89%	1
Croatian Civic Initiative	375	3.32%	1

=== Results in rest of municipalities ===
In seventeen other municipalities ruling Coalition for European Montenegro (DPS, SDP, LP and BS) stay in power in most municipalities. It held an absolute majority in Bar, Budva, Žabljak, Bijelo Polje, Danilovgrad, Šavnik, Mojkovac, Kolašin, Plav, Rožaje, Nikšić, Cetinje, Andrijevica and Berane. The opposition won only in Plužine, where the local SNP won absolute power, and in Pljevlja where local government was formed by joint opposition list.
