= 2014 Podgorica City Assembly election =

← 2010	25 May 2014	2018 →
Party	Leader	Vote %	Seats	+/–
DPS-LP	Migo Stijepović	47.2	29	+1
DF	Miodrag Lekić	27.6	17	+7
SNP	Aleksa Bečić	14.9	8	−6
PCG-SDP	Dragan Bogojević	8.8	5	0
This lists parties that won seats. See the complete results below.
Mayor of Podgorica before	Mayor of Podgorica after
Miomir Mugoša; DPS	Migo Stijepović; DPS

Municipal elections were held in Capital City of Podgorica and eleven other municipalities of Montenegro on 25 May 2014.

== Electoral system ==
Voters in Podgorica determine the composition of the City Assembly, which in turn elects the Mayor. This means that the Mayor is only indirectly elected by the voters. Only parties which reach an electoral threshold of 3% may enter the Assembly.

The Mayor may or may not be a councilor of the Assembly. Assembly's composition is subject to a 4-year election cycle.

== Campaign ==
Socialist People's Party (SNP) decided to run independently under the slogan "youth, wisdom and courage", with Aleksa Bečić as ballot carrier.

New Serb Democracy (NSD) and Movement for Changes (PzP) decided to run together within Democratic Front alliance, with coalition leader Miodrag Lekić, as ballot carrier.

For this local elections ruling Coalition for European Montenegro is composed by Democratic Party of Socialists (DPS) and Liberal Party (LP) as minor coalition member, with Slavoljub Stijepović as ballot carrier.

Social Democratic Party (SDP) decided to form a pre-election alliance with Positive Montenegro (PCG) under the name the "European Look of Podgorica", with Dragan Bogojević as ballot carrier.

== Results ==
Party	Votes	%	Seats
Coalition for European Podgorica	49.146	47.2%	29
Democratic Front	30.002	27.6%	17
Socialist People's Party	14.776	14.9%	8
Social Democratic Party-Positive Montenegro	9.454	8.8%	5
Albanian Coalition	1.242	0.8%	0

Elected mayor: Slavoljub Stijepović (DPS)
