= Constitution of Montenegro =

Governing document of Montenegro

The current Constitution of Montenegro was ratified and adopted by the Constitutional Parliament of Montenegro on 19 October 2007 in an extraordinary session by achieving the required two-thirds supermajority of votes. It was officially proclaimed on 22 October 2007, replacing the constitution of 1992.

== Provisions ==
The Constitution defines Montenegro as a civic, democratic and environmentally friendly country with social justice, established by the sovereign rights of its government.

The preamble identifies the nationalities and national minorities of Montenegro as Montenegrins, Serbs, Bosniaks, Albanians, Muslims, Croats and others as citizens of Montenegro, free, equal and loyal to a civic and democratic Montenegro.

The Constitution identifies Montenegrin as the official language of the state, replacing Serbian after years of civil conflict. Serbian, Bosnian, Albanian and Croatian are all recognised as official languages. It declares that Cyrillic and Latin scripts have equal standing in law.

The Constitution also officially recognises the current flag and coat of arms as legitimate state symbols, as well as the current Montenegrin anthem.

The Constitution states that a citizen of Montenegro is not allowed to be made a refugee, nor extradited to another country unless in compliance with a extradition treaty.

The Constitution guarantees that religion is separate from the state.

The President is constitutionally limited to two five-year terms of office. A candidate must be a citizen of Montenegro and have lived there for at least ten of the prior fifteen years.

== Ratification ==
On 19 October 2007, the Constitutional Parliament of Montenegro held a session filled with heated debate in order to attain the two-thirds supermajority of votes required to ratify the draft Constitution. 55 of the 76 members present voted in favour, the two-thirds supermajority was therefore achieved, and the Constitution duly ratified. The ruling Democratic Party of Socialists of Montenegro (which includes the Croatian Civic Initiative) and the Social Democratic Party of Montenegro, as well as the opposition Movement for Changes, Bosniak Party and the Liberal Party of Montenegro voted in favour of the Constitution. The Socialist People's Party of Montenegro, People's Party, Democratic Serb Party and members of the Serb List opposed it. The ethnic Albanian minority representatives (Democratic League in Montenegro and Albanian Alternative) abstained from voting. The sole representative (and leader) of the Democratic Union of Albanians, Ferhat Dinoša, was abroad and unable to attend the session. Dinoša reportedly refused to vote because he did not want to be for the new Constitution, nor against it when Montenegro needed a Constitution.

Vaselj Siništaj, the sole representative and leader of the Albanian Alternative, refused to vote because he was not given a guarantee by SDP that Malesija would become a full-fledged municipality, independent from the Municipality of Podgorica. The SDP had refused to sign an agreement that approved a referendum to be held in six months to determine whether Malesija (Tuzi) would become a municipality. This agreement had been signed by DPS, PzP, BS, DUA, AA and HGI. It also established that the crosses will be removed from the flag and coat of arms of Montenegro, and the Venice Commission will supervise how the judicial council functions. Siništaj later reported that he believes that this Constitution was made for "future generations and better for tomorrow's Montenegro". Also, none of the amendments from any of the opposition parties was passed.

Miodrag Živković, leader of the Liberal Party of Montenegro, announced that the text of the Constitution should be acceptable to all the people of Montenegro. Nebojša Medojević, leader of the Movement for Changes, said that no one is completely satisfied with the new Constitution. Medojević said that this will be the Constitution of all citizens of Montenegro, and its approval will help the country gain admittance to the European Union.

Milo Đukanović said to the press that the Constitution will "open the European doors to Montenegro's future".

Kemal Purišić of the Bosniak Party said that the new Constitution will give Bosniaks more rights, and that there will be more democratic institutions in Montenegro for government control.

== Controversy ==
The pro-Serbian parties in Montenegro declared the new Constitution to be "Anti-Serbian", which may deepen political divisions within Montenegro. They said they would not respect the new constitution, saying that it violated principles of a multi-cultural and multi-ethnic Montenegro. Predrag Popović, leader of the People's Party, said that he was unable to believe that Serbs would be limited to being classified as a national minority. He also said that this issue would enforce divisions among the ethnic groups and heighten the risk for conflict.

Dobrilo Dedeić, a representative of the Serbian List, ripped up a revised edition of the proposal of the Montenegrin Constitution on 18 October 2007, a day before its adoption, declaring it to be discriminatory toward the Serbian people and stating that it will not bring reconciliation to Montenegro. He also said that the Serbian List, and Serbian people, would not respect the new Constitution. He said they would debate the Serbian issue in Montenegro. He said that the Serbian List would respect the new Constitution as much as the ruling coalition had respected the former Constitution of Montenegro (i.e. the Constitution of the federal Serbia and Montenegro).

Goran Danilović of the Serbian People's Party said he believed that political crises and battles would begin in the country after adoption of the Constitution because it was not designed to achieve political reconciliation. Danilović also announced that he believes the new Constitution to be discriminatory to Serbs in Montenegro.

According to Dragan Šoć of the People's Party, the Constitution of Montenegro as adopted is divisive.

The Albanian minority parties consider the new Constitution to be against the interests of the Albanian people. Mehmet Bardhi, leader of the Democratic League in Montenegro, announced that the Montenegrin government has missed the opportunity, through its lack of readiness, to use the new Constitution to fix Montenegrin-Albanian relations in Montenegro.

== Previous versions ==
=== Union with Serbia ===
The Constitution of the Republic of Montenegro was approved by Montenegro's Parliament on October 12, 1992. This established Montenegro as a democratic ecological and social constituent republic of the Federal Republic of Yugoslavia, with Serbian as its official language. Podgorica is defined as the state's capital. Power is vested in its citizens, who exercise it directly through the election of representatives to the Parliament. Decisions related to changes in constitutional status or to an alteration of borders are subject to a vote of the citizens of Montenegro exercised in a referendum. In the current constitution, there are 121 articles.

=== Socialist republic ===
The Constitution of the republic within SFRY was approved in 1974. The "Socialist Republic of Montenegro" was defined as a constitutive republic of the Socialist Federal Republic of Yugoslavia. The capital was Titograd (since 1992, reverted to Podgorica). Montenegro was defined a free, non-national civic state, with Serbo-Croatian as its official language.

=== Principality ===
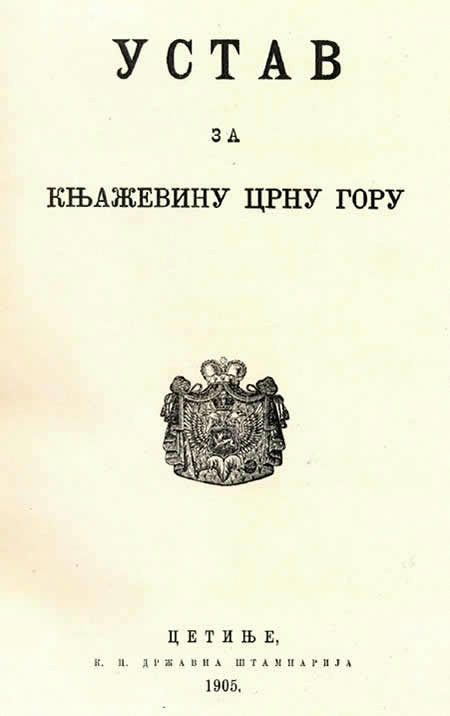
Front page of the Constitution of the Principality of Montenegro.

The Constitution of the Principality of Montenegro was introduced in 1905 in an effort to secularize the realm and limit the monarch's rule. Prince Nicholas I wanted to forestall a revolution like the one in Russia by placating constitutionalists. At that time, Montenegro along with Andorra, Monaco, the Russian Empire, the United Kingdom, and the Ottoman Empire (suspended) were the only states in Europe without a written constitution. It was heavily influenced by the Serbian constitution and came into effect a few months before the Russian Constitution of 1906. It defined Montenegro as a nation-state of the Montenegrins.

Montenegro thus became a constitutional absolutist monarchy. It defined three branches of authority:

- National Assembly (instead of the Senate long ago abolished by Prince Nicholas)
- the Cabinet of Ministers
- the Great Court.

The National Assembly enacted laws. Prince Nicholas kept the power of adoption, and could also enact laws of significant national importance. The Prince (Књаз) was the hereditary head of state and commander of the army. He also named diplomatic representatives of the state.

The Cabinet of Ministers was named and replaced by the prince, and the government was overseen by the parliament. The constitution guaranteed citizens' freedoms: equality under the law, personal freedoms and freedom of conscience.

Montenegro's flag was a red-light blue-white tricolor and a variation of the princedom's coat of arms, a double-headed eagle, was adopted as state. All three major religions were recognized (Eastern Orthodoxy, Roman Catholicism and Islam), and the Montenegrin Church sanctioned. The capital was Cetinje.

== See also ==
- Constitutional Court of Montenegro
- Constitutional Charter of Serbia and Montenegro
