= Serb List (2006) =

Former political alliance in Montenegro

Serb List Српска листа Srpska lista
- Leader: Andrija Mandić
- Founded: 2006
- Dissolved: 2009
- Merged into: New Serb Democracy
- Headquarters: Podgorica
- Ideology: National conservatism Right-wing populism Serbian–Montenegrin unionism
- Political position: Right-wing

Party flag

The Serb List (Serbian: Српска листа / Srpska lista) was a political alliance in Montenegro between 2006 and 2009.

== Program ==
As a representative of the Serbs of Montenegro, Serb List advocated special ties between Montenegro and Serbia, Serbian citizenship for Serbs in Montenegro, and protection of the Serbian language and Serbian Orthodox Church (its Montenegrin branch, the Metropolitanate of Montenegro and the Littoral) as the official language and church in Montenegro, respectively.

== History ==
At the elections in Montenegro, on September 10, 2006, the party won 12 out of 81 seats, with 49,730 votes (14.68%). It was the strongest opposition list in the Parliament. In contrast to other political coalitions, Serb List was not simply a coalition of parties, but an entity on its own; for instance, the MPs elected on its list are not considered to represent the party they originally come from, but Serb List.

In late 2007 Serb List representative signed the Opposition Charter, uniting with the Movement for Changes, the Socialist People's Party of Montenegro, the People's Party, the Democratic Serb Party, the Bosniak Party, the Albanian Alternative and the Democratic League in Montenegro into a standing bloc to oppose a Constitutional draft proposed and attempted to be imposed by the ruling DPS-SDP coalition. Serb List fiercely opposed renaming the official language of the country from Serbian to Montenegrin.

The alliance merged with the national-conservative Serb People's Party and the People's Socialist Party of Montenegro into the New Serb Democracy, formed on 24 January 2009. Those who did not accepted the merger gathered around the Serb National List, claiming to be the original heir of Serb List. A new party named Serb List was established again on 5 January 2012.

== Members ==
Besides the Serb People's Party of Montenegro, the coalition consisted of various organizations and individuals which present themselves as protectors of the Serbs of Montenegro:

- Serb People's Party led by Andrija Mandić (9 MPs)
- People's Socialist Party of Momir Bulatović (1 MP)
- Democratic Party of Unity of Zoran Žižić (1 MP)
- Party of Serb Radicals led by Duško Sekulić (1 MP)
- Serb National Council of Momčilo Vuksanović (NGO)
