= 2012–2014 Montenegrin municipal elections =

Series of elections in Montenegro

2012-14 Montenegrin municipal elections
| ← 2008-10 | March 2012 - May 2014 | 2016-18 → |
| Party | DPS | SNP | BS |
| Mayors | 17 / 23 | 2 / 23 | 2 / 23 |
| Mayors +/- | Steady | ▼1 | ▲2 |
| Party | SDP | Forca |
| Mayors | 1 / 23 | 1 / 23 |
| Mayors +/- | ▲1 | ▲1 |
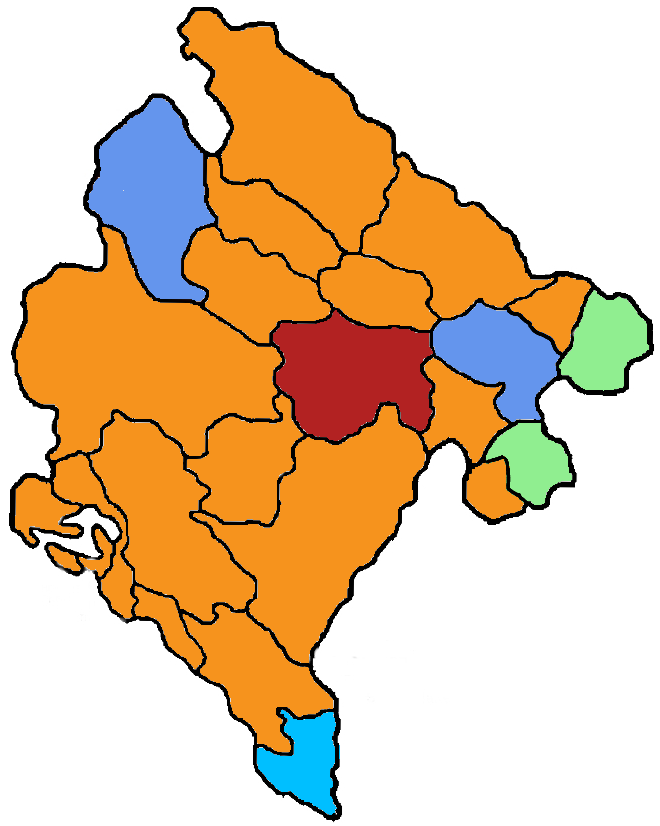
- Mayoral seats

Montenegrin municipal elections were held in all 23 municipalities, between March 2012 and May 2014.

== Results ==
=== Podgorica ===
| Party | Votes | % | Seats |
|---|---|---|---|
| Coalition for European Podgorica | 49.146 | 47.2% | 29 |
| Democratic Front | 30.002 | 27.6% | 17 |
| Socialist People's Party | 14.776 | 14.9% | 8 |
| SDP-Positive Montenegro | 9.454 | 8.8% | 5 |
| Albanian Coalition | 1.242 | 0.8% | 0 |

Elected mayor: Slavoljub Stijepović (DPS)

=== Nikšić ===
| Party | Percentage | Seats |
|---|---|---|
| Coalition for European Montenegro | 51.7% | 23 |
| Democratic Front | 31.2% | 13 |
| Socialist People's Party | 8.5% | 3 |
| Positive Montenegro | 6.6% | 2 |

Elected mayor - Veselin Grbović (European Montenegro - Positive)

=== Herceg Novi ===
| Party | Percentage | Seats |
|---|---|---|
| Democratic Party of Socialists | 35.6% | 13 |
| The Choice - Local Group of Citizens | 24.9% | 9 |
| Let's Save Herceg Novi - SNP, DF | 23.3% | 8 |
| Novi List | 5.3% | 2 |
| Social Democratic Party | 5.2% | 2 |
| Liberal Party | 0.95% | 0 |

Turnout - 68.2% Elected mayor - Nikša Gojković (The Choice - DPS coalition)

== Results in rest of municipalities ==
At elections in the rest of municipalities ruling DPS stay in power in most municipalities. It held an absolute majority in Bar, Žabljak, Budva and Bijelo Polje, formed ruling coalitions with SDP in Danilovgrad, Pljevlja, Andrijevica, Šavnik, Tivat, Cetinje, Kotor and Mojkovac and with Bosniak Party in Plav, Rožaje, Petnjica and Gusinje, and in Herceg Novi, where DPS-SDP coalition formed majority with local parties. The opposition won only in Plužine, where the local SNP won absolute power, in Berane, where the opposition formed a joint coalition at the local level and in Kolašin where SDP form an post-election coalition with opposition to form local government. While in Ulcinj, the local government formed the Albanian minority parties.
