= Koča Pavlović =

Montenegrin politician (1962–2019)

Member of Parliament
- In office 2006–2019

Personal details
- Born: 17 September 1962 Žabljak, SR Montenegro, Yugoslavia
- Died: 19 September 2019 (aged 57) Belgrade, Serbia
- Party: Movement for Changes
- Education: University of Montenegro

Koča Pavlović (Montenegrin Cyrillic: Коча Павловић; 17 September 1962 – 19 September 2019) was a Montenegrin journalist and politician.

== Filmmaking career ==
Pavlović began his career as a journalist, working as a political talk-show host and chief editor of NTV Montena and TV Budva television networks.

=== War for Peace ===
In 2004, Pavlović directed the documentary film "War for Peace" (Rat za mir), the first Montenegrin documentary about the involvement of the Montenegrin army in the Civil War in Yugoslavia and the Siege of Dubrovnik. The film was produced by Podgorica-based production company, Obala. The movie sparked great controversies in Montenegro. The movie was banned before release, and it wouldn't be until 2022 that it was shown in the country.

== Political career ==
Pavlović was a founding member of a non-governmental organization Group for Changes, which was transformed into a political party in 2006. Since the elections in 2006, the Movement for Changes (PzP) has established itself as one of the strongest parliamentary opposition parties in the country, Koča Pavlović served as a Member of Parliament for PzP and as the party's spokesman. Following the 2009, 2012 and 2016 elections Pavlović served in the Parliament of Montenegro as an opposition MP for the Movement for Changes. In 2017, he signed the Declaration on the Common Language of the Croats, Serbs, Bosniaks and Montenegrins.

== Death ==
Pavlović died on 19 September 2019, in Belgrade, where he had been staying for some time to receive medical treatment.

== See also ==
- Movement for Changes
- Democratic Front
