= Serbian National Council =

Serbian National Council may refer to:

- Serbian National Council of Bosnia and Herzegovina, former political organization
- Serbian National Council in Croatia (1990), former political organization
- Serbian National Council (Croatia), modern political organization
- Serbian National Council of Slavonia, Baranja and Western Syrmia, former political organization
- Serbian National Council of Kosovo and Metohija
- Serbian National Council of Montenegro, created in 2008
- Serbian National Defense Council, an organization in the USA

== See also ==
- Serbian (disambiguation)
