= Zoran Žižić =

4th Prime Minister of FR Yugoslavia

- Зоран Жижић

4th Prime Minister of the Federal Republic of Yugoslavia
- In office 4 November 2000 – 24 July 2001
- President: Vojislav Koštunica
- Preceded by: Momir Bulatović
- Succeeded by: Dragiša Pešić

Deputy Prime Minister of Montenegro
- In office 15 February 1991 – 24 December 1996
- Prime Minister: Milo Đukanović

Personal details
- Born: 4 March 1951 Titograd, PR Montenegro, FPR Yugoslavia
- Died: 4 January 2013 (aged 61) Podgorica, Montenegro
- Party: Democratic Party of Socialists (1991–1998); Socialist People's Party of Montenegro (1998–2005); Democratic Party of Unity (2006–2013)

Zoran Žižić (Serbian Cyrillic: Зоран Жижић; 4 March 1951 – 4 January 2013) was a Yugoslav and Montenegrin politician. He served as Deputy Prime Minister of Montenegro in the first two Đukanović cabinets from 1991 to 1996, and was the first Prime Minister of the Federal Republic of Yugoslavia following the overthrow of Slobodan Milošević in 2000.

Žižić resigned from the position of Prime Minister in protest over the extradition of Slobodan Milošević to the ICTY in June 2001. He was part of the hard-line Serbian nationalist wing of the Socialist People's Party and was expelled in 2005 following disagreements with its moderate leader Predrag Bulatović.

== Early life and education ==
Zoran Žižić was born on 4 March 1951 in Titograd.

His father Živko Žižić fought for the Yugoslav Partisans in World War II and was a pre-war member of the Communist Party of Yugoslavia. After the war, he held the positions of state prosecutor, federal deputy, then minister of education and justice in the Government of Montenegro, as well as the president of the Supreme Court of Montenegro. Zoran's mother was Sonja Žižić (née Ivanović). On his father's side, Zoran's ancestors belonged to the tribe of Uskoci. On his mother's side, he is descended from the tribe of Kuči.

Žižić attended both elementary school and the Gymnasium in his hometown. He graduated and obtained a magister degree from the University of Belgrade Faculty of Law. He returned to his hometown and worked at the University of Montenegro Faculty of Law, first as an assistant, and later as a lecturer.

== Political career ==
Žižić was a member of the League of Communists of Yugoslavia. However, his first active participation in politics was during the Anti-bureaucratic Revolution in 1989. He became head of the Main Board of the Democratic Party of Socialists (DPS) and an MP in the Federal Assembly of the Federal Republic of Yugoslavia.

Žižić's first elected office was Deputy Prime Minister of Montenegro, a position he held during the first and second Đukanović cabinets. As Deputy Prime Minister, Žižić worked on the project of reforming Montenegro into an offshore financial center.

After Momir Bulatović's split with the DPS, Žižić followed him and was elected vice president of the newly formed Socialist People's Party of Montenegro (SNP) in 1998. He became Prime Minister of the Federal Republic of Yugoslavia on 4 November 2000 shortly after the overthrow of Slobodan Milošević, when the Bulatović cabinet collapsed.

Žižić resigned on 29 June 2001, after eight months in office, in protest over the extradition of Slobodan Milošević to the ICTY. He left the position on 24 July 2001 when a new cabinet was formed following the 2001 Montenegrin parliamentary election, led by his party colleague Dragiša Pešić.

Starting in July 2001 when the leadership of the SNP under Predrag Bulatović supported Pešić, Žižić was in conflict with his party. This culminated in January 2005 with the founding of the Movement for the Joint European State Union of Serbia and Montenegro, which grouped together several Serbian nationalist parties and pro-union moderates. Žižić was voted chief of the organizational committee of the movement on 20 January, and president of the movement on 27 January 2005. The increasingly moderate SNP under Bulatović declined to join, trying to change its image into that of a democratic civic party. Žižić was expelled from the SNP in early April 2005.

Žižić was the president of the Democratic Party of Unity, a party he formed in July 2006. The party was a part of Andrija Mandić's Serb List and Democratic Front coalitions.

== Personal life and death ==
Žižić was married to Mira Žižić, with whom he had two children – daughter Sonja and son Vuk.

Zoran Žižić died after an operation on 4 January 2013 in Podgorica, aged 61. His funeral was attended by Prime Minister of Serbia Ivica Dačić.

Political offices
Preceded by Momir Bulatović	Prime Minister of the Federal Republic of Yugoslavia; 4 November 2000 – 24 July 2001	Succeeded by Dragiša Pešić
