= U.S.–Montenegro Business Council =

The U.S. – Montenegro Business Council is a Maryland-based trade association aimed at promoting trade and investment opportunities between the United States and Montenegro. With offices in both Maryland and Montenegro, the U.S. – Montenegro Business Council makes available to its members a forum whereby they can familiarize themselves with the business opportunities available in both countries and identify appropriate institutions and individuals who can assist in this process. To fulfill this mission, the U.S. – Montenegr

o Business Council assists its members by providing them with the resources and knowledge necessary to successfully pursue business opportunities in the United States and Montenegro.

== Activities ==
The activities of the U.S. – Montenegro Business Council fall into the following categories:

- Market Research - Conduct tailored market research covering issues such as: sector trends, competitors, product/service offerings, distribution channels, and price points.
- Foreign Company Research - Identify and qualify potential overseas representation, joint venture partners, agents and distributors for United States and Montenegrin companies, and contacts in government, non-corporate, and the private sector.
- Counseling - Provide pre-market entry, preparatory, transactional, and crisis counseling; develop international strategic plans.
- Representation Before a Foreign Partner - Provide general expertise on deal structuring including counseling, contract terms, pricing and discounts, and negotiation support.
- Government Relations - Coordinate legislative activities at the federal and State levels of government, including the United States Congress, the State legislative bodies, and other relevant units of government.
- Rule of Law - Arrange multidisciplinary collaboration regarding ways to advance the rule of law.
- Social - Briefings, conferences, and networking opportunities.

== Accomplishments ==
Since its formation, the U.S. – Montenegro Business Council has had a number of professional accomplishments. Such accomplishments include:

- August 1, 2009 - The U.S. – Montenegro Business Council released an international trade and investment documentary, Montenegro: Jewel of the Adriatic, highlighting trade and business opportunities between the United States and Montenegro.
- December 16, 2008 - The State of Maryland established a foreign trade office in the Western Balkans (headquartered in Podgorica) through the efforts of the U.S. – Montenegro Business Council. As a direct result of these efforts the State of Maryland is the first state of any state in the United States to have a physical presence in the Western Balkans.
- October 28, 2008 - The University of Baltimore School of Law in collaboration with the U.S. – Montenegro Business Council shipped American legal textbooks to Montenegro's two law schools: the University of Montenegro and University of UDG in Podgorica. This shipment of legal textbooks is in support of the U.S. – Montenegro Business Council's mission of advancing the rule of law.
- September 8, 2008 - The U.S. – Montenegro Business Council was instrumental in arranging for Mayor Miomir Mugoša and John P. McDonough, Maryland Secretary of State, to sign a Friendship Agreement between the State of Maryland and Podgorica, the capital of Montenegro. The Friendship Agreement between the State of Maryland and Podgorica is the first time any region of Montenegro and any State of the United States have formally agreed to work together to develop and promote trade and investment relations.
- May 8, 2008 - The U.S. – Montenegro Business Council was instrumental in arranging for Montenegro's Minister of Economy Branimir Gvozdenović to meet with James White, the Executive Director of the Maryland Port Administration, and Secretary David Edgerley of Maryland's Department of Business and Economic Development, to discuss furthering trade opportunities and business exchange programs between Montenegro and the State of Maryland.
- April 10, 2008 - The U.S. – Montenegro Business Council along with the University of Baltimore School of Law hosted an event entitled “An Independent Montenegro Year Two: Moving toward NATO and the EU.” Miodrag Vlahović, Montenegro's Ambassador to the United States, was the featured speaker.

== Leadership ==
On October 24, 2008, Charles T. Dillon, Esq. was appointed President of the U.S. – Montenegro Business Council. Mr. Dillon is a Maryland-based business transaction and tax attorney with the Law Office of Charles T. Dillon, and a Tax Scholar from Georgetown University Law Center. Svetlana Vukcevic is the Executive Director of the U.S. – Montenegro Business Council in Podgorica, Montenegro.

The U.S. – Montenegro Business Council's Board of Directors is composed of experts in trade, law, labor, economic development, media, and infrastructure.

== United States Sources ==
- U.S. Department of State
- Maryland Secretary of State Website
- Maryland Secretary of State Translation of News Article
- The Daily Record. September 15, 2008.

== Foreign Sources ==
- Voice of America Broadcast in Montenegro
