= People's Socialist Party of Montenegro =

People's Socialist Party Народна социјалистичка странка Narodna socijalistička stranka
- Leader: Novo Vujošević
- Founder: Momir Bulatović
- Founded: 2001
- Dissolved: 2009
- Split from: Socialist People's Party
- Merged into: New Serb Democracy
- Headquarters: Podgorica
- Ideology: Democratic socialism Serbian-Montenegrin unionism
- Political position: Centre-left
- Colours: Blue, White, Red

The People Socialist Party of Montenegro (Serbian: Народна социјалистичка странка Црне Горе, НСС ЦГ, romanized: Narodna socijalistička stranka Crne Gore, NSS CG) was an opposition political party in Montenegro within the Serbian List due to its support of political union of Montenegro with Serbia, holding 1 seat (represented by MP Emilo Labudović) in the Assembly of the Republic of Montenegro. Its de facto honorary head was Momir Bulatović and the last de jure acting leader was Novo Vujošević.

The party was formed in 2001 from dissidents of the Socialist People's Party of Montenegro under Momir Bulatovic that lost the election for the new party leadership at the party's 2nd Congress to the pro-democratic, pro-European wing of Predrag Bulatović. SNP CG was previously controlled by Momir's leadership since its creation when Momir's wing left the Democratic Party of Socialists of Montenegro in 1998. In late 2001, SNP CG crumbled again with its founders quickly withdrawing from politics, abandoning Momir.

In 2002 NSS led a "Patriotic Coalition for Yugoslavia" with the Serbian Radical Party of Vojislav Šešelj and the Yugoslav Left that failed to enter the parliament not surpassing the threshold.

In 2006 NSS formed a permanent coalition with parties committed to union with Serbia, which included the Serbian People's Party together with the Party of Serb Radicals, Democratic Party of Unity, Socialist Party of Yugoslavia and several non-governmental organizations such as the Serbian People's Council of Montenegro and Academic Alternative, known as the "Serbian List". It received one seat of the 12 that SL won of the total 81-seat Parliament of Montenegro.

In January 2009, it merged into New Serb Democracy.

== Election results ==
=== Parliament ===
Election	Votes	%	Seats	Coalition	Status
2001	10,702	2.9%	0 / 75	–	extra-parliamentary
2002	9,911	2.8%	0 / 75	PKJ	extra-parliamentary
2006	49,730	14.6%	1 / 81	SL	opposition
