= New Serb Democracy =

Montenegrin political party

New Serb Democracy Нова српска демократија Nova srpska demokratija
- Abbreviation: NOVA
- President: Andrija Mandić
- Spokesperson: Mirko Miličić
- Founders: Andrija Mandić; Goran Danilović
- Founded: 24 January 2009
- Merger of: Serb People's Party; People's Socialist Party
- Preceded by: Serb List
- Headquarters: Podgorica
- Ideology: Serbian nationalism; Serbian–Montenegrin unionism; Right-wing populism; Social conservatism
- Political position: Right-wing
- National affiliation: For the Future of Montenegro
- Parliament: 9 / 81
- Local Parliaments: 79 / 844
- Mayors: 3 / 25

Party flag

Website
- nova.org.me

New Serb Democracy (NSD), (Note: Montenegrin: Nova srpska demokratija Montenegrin Cyrillic: Нова српска демократија Serbian: Нова српска демократија, romanized: Nova srpska demokratija) officially abbreviated as NOVA, is a Serbian nationalist right-wing political party in Montenegro, formed on 24 January 2009 as a merger between Serb People's Party and the People's Socialist Party of Montenegro. From 2012 to 2023, it was a constituent member of the Democratic Front.

== History ==
Envisioned as a broad coalition of pro-Serb parties of Montenegro centred around Serb List coalition of 2006, NOVA was planned to include Democratic Serb Party as well as various Serb cultural and political organisations. However, the merger was more limited, as only the Serb People's Party, People's Socialist Party and "Matica Boke" cultural organisation came to a merger agreement. New Serb Democracy is led by Andrija Mandić, leader of the former Serb People's Party. Mandić sought to transform the Serb List coalition into a more moderate and civic-oriented party, in order to boost the party's coalition potential, and even the dropping the "Serb" prefix from the newly formed party's name was considered. This idea was met with strong resistance during the merger talks. A new party was finally established on 24 January 2009.

As a result of more moderate politics of the new party, a series of the opposition uniting attempts follows. In 2009 parliamentary election New Serb Democracy ran independently and won 9.2% of the votes, and 8 seats. Shortly after the election party enters a big tent and pro-EU A Better Montenegro coalition, which includes the entire parliamentary opposition at the time (NSD, PzP and the SNP). The coalition eventually collapsed after bad results at the 2009-10 municipal elections.

Just before the 2012 parliamentary election, the party re-joins coalition with the PzP, this time as part of the originally-big tent and populist Democratic Front alliance led by moderate politician and former diplomat Miodrag Lekić. At the election, Democratic Front finished second with 22.8% of the votes and 20 seats, out of which NOVA won 8. In 2015, Lekić split from the alliance due to internal disagreements with leadership of constituent parties, having decided to form a new liberal-conservative political party, DEMOS. The party faction led by Vice President Goran Danilović leaves the party and joins Lekić's new party.

During the parliamentary election held in 2016, Democratic Front was again second ranked electoral list with 20,32% of the votes and 18 seats, out of which NOVA again won 8.

On 9 May 2019, party leader Mandić and 13 another people were found guilty by the Higher Court in Montenegro for the "plotting to commit terrorist acts and undermine the constitutional order of Montenegro in an alleged coup d'état which allegedly took place on the day of 2016 parliamentary election." In February 2021, the appellate court annulled the first instance verdict on all counts of the indictment.

In the 2020 parliamentary election NOVA participated as a member of the "For the Future of Montenegro" coalition. The list went on to win 32.55% of the votes and 27 seats, out of which 9 went to NOVA.

Andrija Mandić, president of New Serb Democracy was that party's and Democratic Front presidential candidate for the 2023 Montenegrin presidential election. He ended up being third, receiving 65,385 votes (19.32%).

New Serb Democracy, alongside Movement for Changes and Democratic People's Party, decided to dissolve Democratic Front coalition on the 14th of May 2023.

New Serb Democracy participated in the 2023 Montenegrin Parliamentary election as a member of the "For the Future of Montenegro" coalition. The list went on to win 14.76% of the votes and 13 seats, out of which 9 went to NOVA.

Andrija Mandić, president of New Serb Democracy was elected the Speaker of the Parliament on the 30th of October 2023.

== Ideology ==
Initially, the party tried to position itself as conservative and centre-right political organization, willingly to compromise with traditionally Montenegrin parties, supporting accession to the European Union, originally opposing NATO membership and advocating rights for the Serb ethnic minority in more democratic and institutional manner, unlike its predecessor, the Serb People's Party.

The party has been the strongest supporter of the State of Israel in Montenegro, publicly expressing its support following the October 7 attacks and the subsequent conflict. New Serb Democracy has also been identified as the political party in Montenegro that supports the policies of U.S. President Donald J. Trump and his administration. Andrija Mandić, President of New Serb Democracy, signed the nomination of Donald J. Trump for the 2026 Nobel Peace Prize.

The party also shifted its stance on NATO membership, with its president saying that Montenegro greatly benefits from being a member of this mutual defense system.

In the past, New Serb Democracy maintained cooperation with United Russia and a very close relations with the right-wing populist Serbian Progressive Party regime in Serbia. In recent years, the party has shifted its stances to the center, fully supporting accession to the European Union, while also declaring the need to preserve traditional values of Montenegro. The party is currently the main advocate of Serbian-Montenegrin unionism. NOVA has repeatedly requested a new constitutional amendment so that the national symbols of Montenegro (adopted in 2004) could be changed to represent the entirety of Montenegro. The party also demands that the Serbian language enters the Constitution of Montenegro as the official language.

New Serb Democracy jointly with Democratic People's Party maintains cooperation with the largest party in Republika Srpska (entity within Bosnia and Herzegovina) the Alliance of Independent Social Democrats and the party also maintains historically close cooperation with multiple parties in Serbia an positive relations with the Government of Serbia.

=== "New Serb Answer" platform ===
During his tenure as President of the Parliament, Mandić promoted a political approach he described as a “new Serb answer for new times”, presenting it as a shift from earlier confrontational models toward reconciliation, dialogue and institutional cooperation. He framed this approach around the idea that the Serb community in Montenegro should pursue issues it considers central to its national identity through compromise, alliance-building and participation in the country's political institutions, while maintaining constructive relations with Montenegrins, Bosniaks, Albanians and other communities. Mandić has linked this position to broader calls for equal rights, social stability and Montenegro's European path.

== Electoral performance ==
=== Parliamentary elections ===
Election	Party leader	Performance				Alliance	Government
Election	Party leader	Votes	%	Seats	+/–	Alliance	Government
2009	Andrija Mandić	29,883	9.2%	8 / 81	New	–	Opposition
2012	Andrija Mandić	82,773	22.82%	8 / 81	0	DF	Opposition
2016	Andrija Mandić	77,784	20.32%	8 / 81	0	DF	Opposition
2020	Andrija Mandić	133,261	32.55%	9 / 81	▲1	DF – ZBCG	Support 2020–22
2020	Andrija Mandić	133,261	32.55%	9 / 81	▲1	DF – ZBCG	Opposition 2022–23
2023	Andrija Mandić	44,565	14.74%	9 / 81	0	ZBCG	Support 2023–24
2023	Andrija Mandić	44,565	14.74%	9 / 81	0	ZBCG	Government 2024–27

=== Presidential elections ===
President of Montenegro
Election year	#	Candidate	1st round votes	% of vote	2nd round vote	% of vote	Notes
2013	2nd	Miodrag Lekić	154,289	48.79%	—	—	Independent, support
2018	2nd	Mladen Bojanić	111,711	33.40%	—	—	Independent, support
2023	3rd	Andrija Mandić	65,385	19.32%	—	—	Democratic Front

== Positions held ==
President of the Parliament of Montenegro	Years
Andrija Mandić	2023–
