= Škerović =

Škerović may also refer to:

== People ==
- Jelena Škerović (born 1980), Montenegrin basketball player
- Slobodan Škerović (born 1954), Serbian author, painter and philosopher

== Other uses ==
- Gymnasium "Slobodan Škerović", school in Montenegro
