= Mareza =

Location
- Country: Montenegro

Physical characteristics
- Mouth
  - location: Morača
  - coordinates: 42.4127°N 19.2194°E

Basin features
- Progression: Morača→ Lake Skadar→ Bojana→ Adriatic Sea

The Mareza (Montenegrin Cyrillic: Мареза) is a river in Montenegro. It also lends its name to a suburb of Podgorica, where the river originates.

== The river ==
The Mareza is a small river that originates at the Mareza Springs, some 3 km northwest of Podgorica's neighbourhood of Tološi. The Mareza Springs are the source of much of Podgorica's drinking water. It also provides water for the Mareza fish pond, an artificial pond created for fish breeding. From there on, the Mareza generally has a form of a small canal, and empties into the Morača just south of Podgorica.

== The suburb ==
Mareza is also a name of a settlement around the Mareza Springs. It is a favourite excursion site of Podgorica citizens, partly because it has a few degrees lower temperature than Podgorica city in the summer months. It is also a home of one of the Plantaže restaurants, famed for its traditional Montenegrin cuisine. It is somewhat exclusive residential area, one of the residents being the former Mayor of Podgorica, Miomir Mugoša.
