= Party of Serb Radicals =

Party of Serb Radicals Странка српских радикала
- Leader: Duško Sekulić
- Founder: Vojislav Šešelj
- Founded: 5 August 1992
- Dissolved: 2021
- Headquarters: Podgorica
- Ideology: Serbian ultranationalism Right-wing populism Social conservatism Serbian-Montenegrin unionism Russophilia; Hard Euroscepticism
- Political position: Far-right
- Serbian counterpart: Serbian Radical Party (1992–2021)

Party of Serb Radicals (Serbian: Странка српских радикала, Stranka srpskih radikala, SSR), formerly Serbian Radical Party of Montenegro (SRS CG), was a minor far-right and Serbian nationalist political party, active in Montenegro.

== History ==
The SSR was formed by the former members of Serbian Radical Party, after it ceased its activity in Montenegro. The SSR was part of the New Serb Democracy. Following the return of party leader and convicted war criminal Vojislav Šešelj from his trial for war crimes at the ICTY in The Hague, the SSR merged back into the Serbian Radical Party which renewed its activity in Montenegro.

== Electoral results ==
Parliament of Montenegro
Year	Popular vote	% of popular vote	Overall seats won	Coalition	Government
1992	22,329	7.56%	8 / 75	—	opposition
1996	12,963	4.31%	0 / 75	—	extra-parliamentary
1998	4,060	1.17%	0 / 75	—	extra-parliamentary
2001	4,275	1.17%	0 / 75	—	extra-parliamentary
2002	9,911	2.84%	0 / 75	PKJ	extra-parliamentary
2006	49,730	14.68%	1 / 81	SL	opposition
2009	4,291	1.30%	0 / 81	SNL	extra-parliamentary
2012	3,085	0.85%	0 / 81	with DSS	extra-parliamentary
2016	693	0.18%	0 / 81	—	extra-parliamentary
2020	133,267	32.55%	0 / 81	with ZBCG	extra-parliamentary

== See also ==
- Serbian Radical Party
- Serbian nationalism
