= List of ambassadors of Montenegro to China =

Coordinates: 39.934194°N 116.458543°E

Ambassador of Montenegro to the People's Republic of China
- Incumbent; Darko Pajović since June 15, 2018
- Inaugural holder: Ljiljana Tošković
- Formation: January 15, 2009

The Montenegrin ambassador in Beijing is the official representative of the Government in Podgorica to the Government of the People's Republic of China

== List of representatives ==
Diplomatic agrément/Diplomatic accreditation	ambassador	Observations	Prime Minister of Montenegro	Premier of the People's Republic of China	Term end
June 3, 2006		The Montenegrin Parliament declared the independence of Montenegro.	Milo Đukanović	Wen Jiabao	
November 13, 2007		Montenegrin embassy in China opened in Beijing	Željko Šturanović	Wen Jiabao	
January 15, 2009	Ljiljana Tošković		Željko Šturanović	Wen Jiabao	
March 12, 2012	Branko Perovic	On August 18, 2008, he was succeeded by Ranko Milovic as ambassador in Ljubljana (Slovenia).	Željko Šturanović	Wen Jiabao	
