= Danijela Đurović =

Montenegrin politician

- Данијела Ђуровић
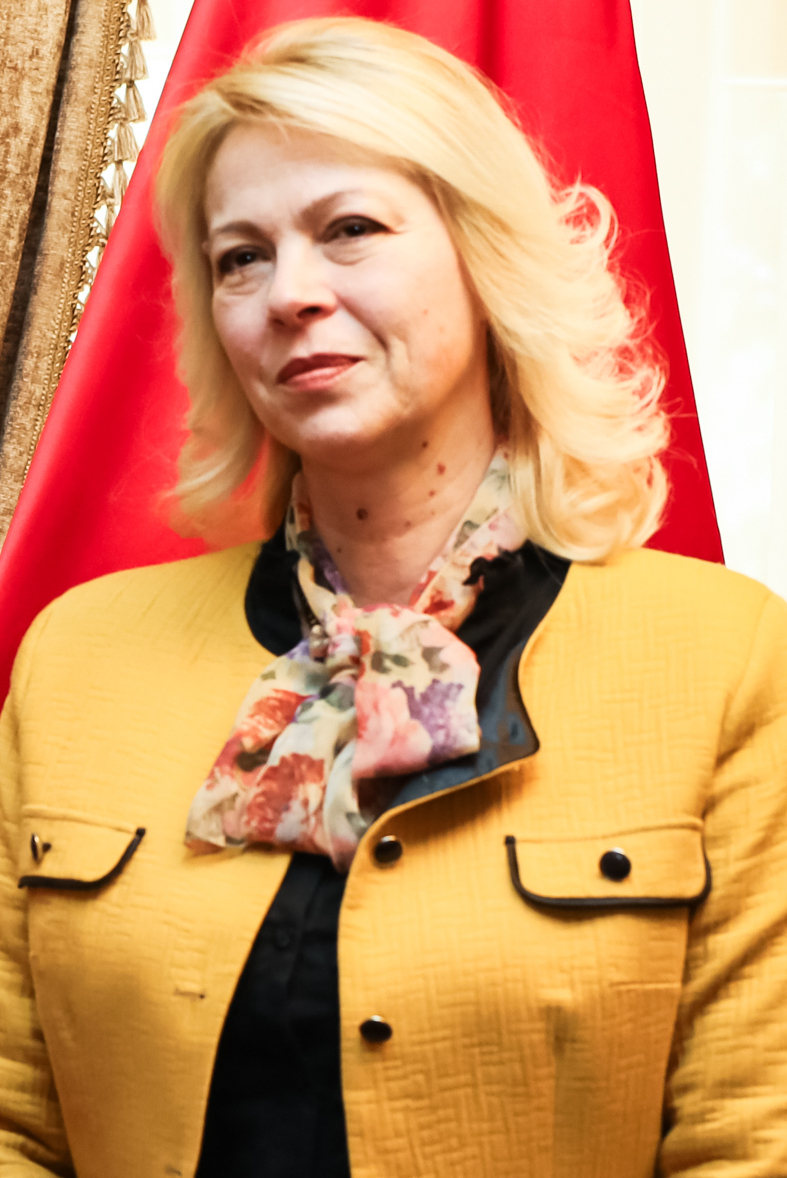
- Đurović in 2022

President of the Parliament of Montenegro
- In office 28 April 2022 – 30 October 2023
- Preceded by: Strahinja Bulajić (acting); Aleksa Bečić
- Succeeded by: Andrija Mandić

Member of the Parliament of Montenegro
- In office 23 September 2020 – 28 April 2022
- President: Aleksa Bečić

Personal details
- Born: 27 March 1973 (age 53) Kotor, SR Montenegro, SFR Yugoslavia
- Party: SNP (2008–2023); Independent (2023–present)
- Children: 2 sons
- Education: University of Belgrade; University of Montenegro

Danijela Đurović (Montenegrin Cyrillic: Данијела Ђуровић; born 27 March 1973) is a Montenegrin politician. She served as the president of the Parliament of Montenegro from 28 April 2022 to 30 October 2023. She was a vice president of the Socialist People's Party (SNP) from 2017 to 2021.

== Biography ==
She was born in Kotor, SR Montenegro, SFR Yugoslavia on 27 March 1973. She finished middle and part of high school in Herceg Novi, and graduated in Peoria, Illinois.

She earned a bachelor's degree in management engineering from the Faculty of Organizational Sciences in Belgrade and a master's degree in ecology and environmental protection from the Faculty of Natural Sciences and Mathematics in Podgorica.

She worked in the company "Generalmarket" d.o.o. Belgrade as the head of the commercial service from 1996 to 2000. From 2000 to 2008, she worked in "Čistoća" d.o.o. Herceg Novi in the field of strategic development and improvement of the quality system, manager of the commercial sector and as an assistant director.

She is the author of several scientific papers in the field of environmental protection and an expert associate and consultant in the field of waste management in the country and abroad.

She is married, and mother of two sons.

=== Political career ===
She is a member of the Socialist People's Party (SNP) since 2008.

From 2008 to 2012 she performed the duties of the manager of the Herceg Novi Municipality and from 2012 to 2015 she served as the first female President of the Municipal Assembly of Herceg Novi. She was elected vice president of the Municipality of Herceg Novi in 2017.

She was the vice president of SNP from 2017 to 2021.

Following the 2020 parliamentary elections, Đurović was elected to the Parliament of Montenegro as part of the For the Future of Montenegro coalition.

On 28 April 2022, Đurović was elected President of the Parliament of Montenegro. On 15 May 2023, Đurović, along with government ministers Marko Kovač and Miomir Vojinović, left SNP.
