= Ministry of Capital Investments (Montenegro) =

- Ministarstvo kapitalnih investicija

Agency overview
- Formed: 2006 (2020)
- Jurisdiction: Government of Montenegro
- Headquarters: Podgorica
- Agency executive: Ervin Ibrahimović, Ministry of Capital Investments
- Website: msp.gov.me

Minister of Capital Investments (Montenegrin: Ministar kapitalnih investicija) is the person in charge of the Ministry of Capital Investments of Montenegro (Ministarstvo kapitalnih investicija). Ministry of Capital Investments was formed in December 2020 with reorganization of the Ministry of Transportation and Maritime Affairs (Montenegrin: Ministarstvo saobraćaja i pomorstva) and Montenegrin Ministry of Economy (Ministarstvo Ekonomije Crne Gore).

== Government Ministers, since 2006 ==
Social Democratic Party Bosniak Party Independent

Minister	Start of term	End of term
Andrija Lompar	10 November 2006	4 December 2012
Ivan Brajović	4 December 2012	28 November 2016
Osman Nurković	28 November 2016	4 December 2020
Mladen Bojanić	4 December 2020	28 April 2022
Ervin Ibrahimović	28 April 2022	incumbent
