= Democratic Party of Unity =

Democratic Party of Unity Demokratska stranka jedinstva Демократска странка јединства
- Leader: Nebojša Jušković
- Founder: Zoran Žižić
- Founded: 2006
- Merged into: Popular Movement (Montenegro)
- Ideology: National conservatism Serbian-Montenegrin unionism Russophilia; Hard euroscepticism
- Political position: Right-wing

Democratic Party of Unity (Montenegrin: Демократска странка јединства, Demokratska stranka jedinstva, DSJ) was a minor extra-parliamentary national conservative Serbian-Montenegrin unionist political party in Montenegro.

== History ==
The party was founded in July 2006 by Zoran Žižić, former Prime Minister of the Federal Republic of Yugoslavia and former Deputy Prime Minister of Montenegro. Between 2006 and 2009, the party was a constituent member of the Serb List (Srpska lista) coalition.

In 2012 and from 2015 until 2017, the DSJ was a constituent member of the opposition right-wing Democratic Front (DF) alliance. The party supported the For the Future of Montenegro (ZBCG) list for the 2020 parliamentary election.

In February 2020, the party merged into the newly formed Popular Movement (Montenegro).

== Electoral results ==
=== Parliamentary elections ===
Parliament of Montenegro
Year	Popular vote	% of popular vote	Overall seats won	Seat change	Coalition	Government
2006	49,730	14.68%	1 / 81	▲1	with SL	opposition
2009	Did not run	Did not run	0 / 81	▼1	—	extra-parliamentary
2012	82,773	22.82%	1 / 81	▲1	with DF	opposition
2016	77,784	20.32%	0 / 81	▼1	with DF	extra-parliamentary
2020	133,267	32.55%	0 / 81	Steady	with ZBCG	extra-parliamentary
2023	77,203	25.53%	0 / 81	▼1	with ZBCG	extra-parliamentary

=== Presidential elections ===
Election	Candidate	1st round		2nd round	
Election	Candidate	Votes	%	Votes	%
2008	Andrija Mandić	2nd	19.55%	—N/a	—N/a
2013	Miodrag Lekić	2nd	48.79%	—N/a	—N/a
2018	Mladen Bojanić	2nd	33.40%	—N/a	—N/a
2023	Jakov Milatović	2nd	28.92%	1st	58.88%
