= Vijeće narodnih skupština Crne Gore =

Council of National Assemblies of Montenegro (Serbian: Вијеће народних скупштина Црне Горе/Vijeće narodnih skupština Crne Gore) is a non-governmental organization that represents the historical tribes of Montenegro. Representatives include notable intellectuals. The Directoring board president is Nikola Kusovac and Assembly president is Momčilo Vuksanović (as of 2016).

The organization issued a declaration against the accession of Montenegro to NATO, signed by 72 representatives of 24 historical tribes, on 21 March 2016. The manifestation was held at the Podgorica cathedral.

== Sources ==
- NSPM (22 March 2016). "Вијеће народних скупштина Црне Горе, које окупља истакнуте интелектуалце, усвојило декларацију против уласка ЦГ у НАТО". NSPM.
- Đurić, Novica (21 March 2016). "Двадесет четири црногорска племена против НАТО-а". Politika.
