= Slobodan Škerović Gymnasium =

- Gimnazija "Slobodan Škerović"
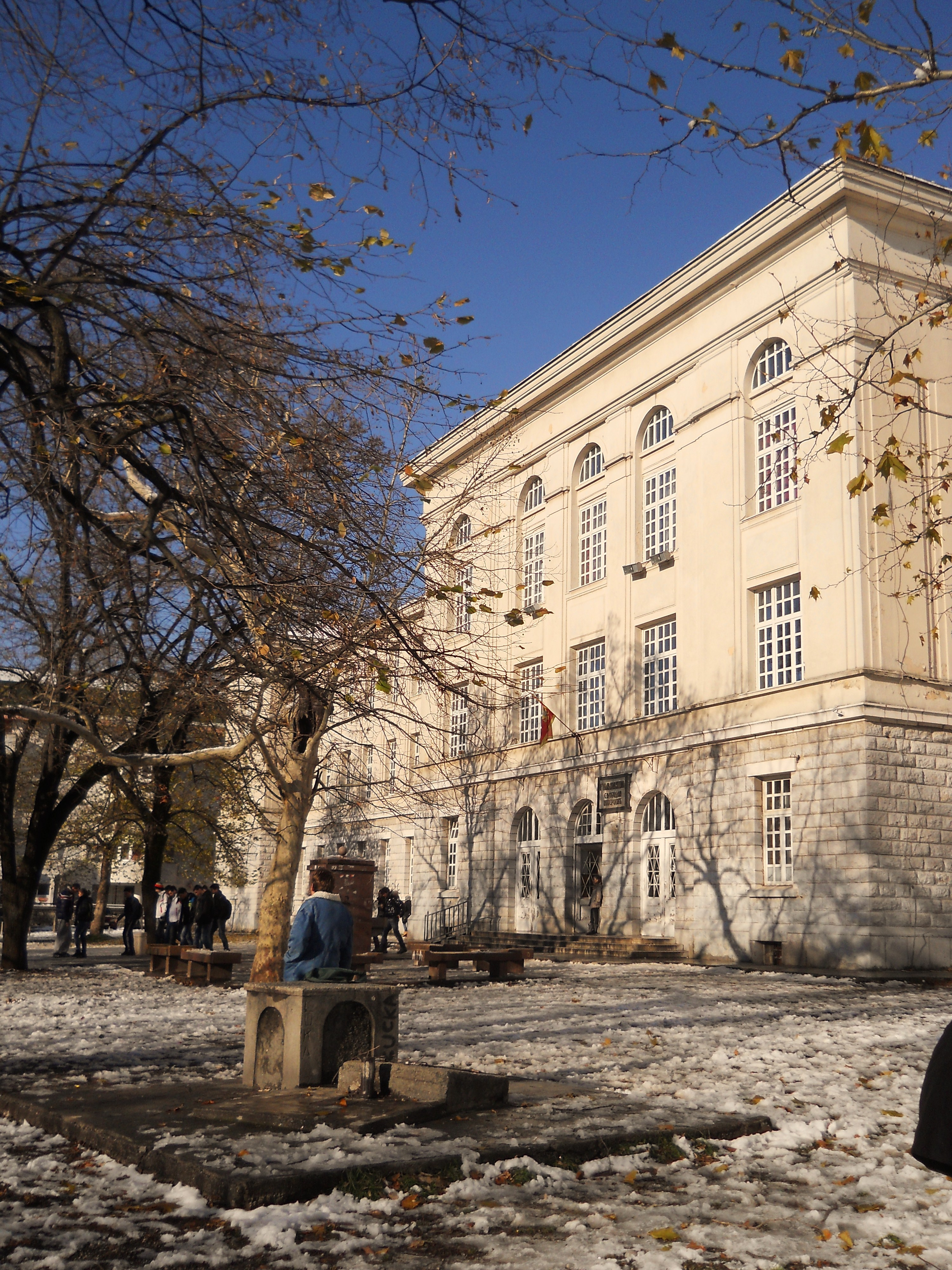

Location
- Vaka Đurovića 25; Podgorica, 81000; Montenegro
- Coordinates: 42.446942°N 19.263548°E

Information
- School type: public, comprehensive high school
- Established: 1907
- Status: open
- Head of school: Zoran Pejović
- Grades: 10th through 13th
- Enrollment: approx. 2100
- Classes: 50
- Average class size: 34
- Language: Montenegrin
- Classrooms: 24 (+ 3 cabinets)
- Newspaper: "Koraci"”Znak””Ljetopis”
- Website: www.gimnazijapg.com

The Slobodan Škerović Gymnasium (Montenegrin: Gimnazija "Slobodan Škerović", Гимназија "Слободан Шкеровић"), also known as the Podgorica Gymnasium (Montenegrin: Podgorička gimnazija, Подгоричка гимназија) is a high school (gymnasium) located in the city of Podgorica, Montenegro. It is the oldest secondary school in the town.

== History ==
By a decree of King Nicholas I of Montenegro, the Lower State Gymnasium was established in 1907, in Podgorica. Its higher grades have been opened in 1914 and 1915. During the occupation of Montenegro by the Austro-Hungarian forces, between 1916 and 1918, the school was closed.

After the First World War, the school was reopened. The Great Gymnasium of Podgorica was established on February 12, 1919, following a decree signed by the executive committee of the Podgorica City Assembly.

In 1960, the school was renamed the "Slobodan Škerović" Gymnasium, to honor its former student and famous Montenegrin revolutionary, Slobodan Škerović. Between 1978 and 1980, in accordance with the Law on Vocational Secondary Education, the school was transformed from a gymnasium to the School of Natural Sciences and Humanities "Slobodan Škerović" in Titograd, as part of a complex institution called the Center for Socio-Economic Education.

In 1980, it stepped out of the Center for Socio-Economic Education and started working as an independent vocational education school. The school regained its former name in 1991, and is now known as the Public institution Gymnasium "Slobodan Škerović".

== Organization ==
Since the 2006 educational reforms in Montenegro, the two departments of the gymnasium (the philological and the mathematical department) were closed, and the school was transformed into a General Gymnasium. Ten years later, the departments were reopened but are now geared toward gifted students.

The school building was built in 1930. It has a modern sports hall, a ceremonial hall, a library (with a reading room and a multimedia hall) and a bookstore.

At the end of their secondary education at the gymnasium, students take an external graduation exam (Matura)

== Former students ==
Some of the schools renowned graduates include:

- Miomir Mugoša, former Mayor of Podgorica
- Boro Vučinić, former Minister of Defense of Montenegro
