= Momčilo Vuksanović (Montenegrin politician) =

Momčilo Vuksanović (Serbian Cyrillic: Момчило Вуксановић; born 1955) is a Montenegrin educator and the president of the Serb National Council of Montenegro (since 2008) and Assembly president of the Council of People's Assemblies Montenegro (since 2016). He was a delegate in the parliament of Serbia and Montenegro (2003–06). He has founded the magazine Srpske novine, radio station Cool, television station Srpska televizija, and other organizations. He is ethnic Serb, and politically unaffiliated. Since 2006, he is also president of the executive board of the NGO Serbian People's Council of Montenegro.

As the representative of the Serb National Council of Montenegro, with the blessing of Metropolitan Joanikije, he renovated a monument dedicated to fallen soldiers of the Battle of Mojkovac, after it had suffered vandalism. A cross was additionally added on the top of the monument. On June 28th 2016, the court of Bijelo Polje proclaimed him guilty of desecrating a monument due to placing a cross on the renovated monument. He was sentenced to 1 year suspended

== Sources ==
- Фонд за заштиту и остваривање мањинских права. "Др Момчило Вуксановић". Фонд за заштиту и остваривање мањинских права.
