= Serb National Council of Montenegro =

NGO representing minority interests of Serbs in Montenegro

- Flag of the Serb National Council of Montenegro
- Formation: 2008
- Type: Non-governmental organization
- Legal status: Elected political, advisory and coordinating umbrella organization
- Purpose: Protection of interests of and rights of Serbs in Montenegro in matters regarding civil rights and cultural identity
- Region served: Montenegro
- Official language: Serbian
- President: Momčilo Vuksanović

The Serb National Council of Montenegro (Serbian: Српски национални савјет Црне Горе, romanized: Srpski nacionalni savjet Crne Gore) is a non-governmental organization representing the interests of Serbs of Montenegro in matters regarding ethnic rights and cultural identity. Its president is Momčilo Vuksanović.

== See also ==
- New Serb Democracy
