= Civic Party of Montenegro =

Civic Party of Montenegro Građanska partija Crne Gore Грађанска партија Црне Горе
- Leader: Krsto Pavićević (2002–2006); Collective leadership (2006–2010)
- Founded: 2002
- Dissolved: 2010
- Headquarters: Podgorica
- Ideology: Liberalism; Montenegrin nationalism Pro-Europeanism
- Political position: Centre
- National affiliation: European Montenegro (2002–2006)
- Colours: Blue and yellow

The Civic Party of Montenegro (Montenegrin: Građanska partija Crne Gore) was a minor liberal political party in Montenegro.

== History ==
In the 2006 parliamentary election in Montenegro, the party did not manage to win a seat in Montenegrin Parliament. The party and its leader were active in promoting Montenegro's independence prior to Montenegrin independence referendum, along with the DPS, SDP, DUA, LP and others.

After Civic Party's failure to gain any seats in Parliament in the 2006 parliamentary election, its leader Krsto Pavićević resigned from the position of the party's president, along with two vice presidents, Petar Bokan and Slobodan Medenica. Until the next party congress, Civic Party of Montenegro was led by the team of coordinators which consisted of its prominent members, Džoni Hodžić, Milorad Dapčević, Neđeljko Đurović and Davor Klasić. After its lack of electoral success at the 2010 local elections, the party ceased its further activity.

The party remained formally registered until December 2017, when it was formally deleted from the Register of Political Parties.

== Electoral results ==
=== Parliamentary elections ===
Parliament of Montenegro
Year	Popular vote	% of popular vote	Overall seats won	Seats change	Coalition	Government
2002	167,166	48.0%	1 / 75	Steady	ECG	supp Government
2006	2,906	0.86%	0 / 81	Steady	—	extra-parliamentary
