= Aleksandar Stamatović =

Serbian historian (born 1967)

Dr. Aleksandar Stamatović
- Александар Стаматовић
- Born: February 12, 1967 (age 59); Sarajevo, SR Bosnia and Herzegovina, Yugoslavia (now Bosnia and Herzegovina)
- Occupations: Historian, writer, politician, professor
- Relatives: Vojvoda Stamatović
- Writing career
- Language: Serbian
- Genre: History

Aleksandar Stamatović (Serbian Cyrillic: Александар Стаматовић; born February 12, 1967) is a prominent Serbian historian, professor and politician.

== Personal life ==
Stamatović was born in Sarajevo, SR Bosnia and Herzegovina, to a family from Montenegro which worked in Sarajevo at the time. In 1976, the family returned to SR Montenegro where he finished primary and secondary school, in history and archaeology. He served in the Yugoslav Army from 1985–86. He graduated from the Philological Faculty (history and geography) in Nikšić, in March 1991. He received a master's degree in the Philosophical Faculty (history) in Priština, in 1994. He received a Ph.D. from the Philosophical Faculty (history) in Belgrade, in January 2000. For thirteen years he worked as a professor on history in a number of primary and secondary schools in Podgorica, Montenegro. In the 1998-2001 period he was an honorary professor on general history in the Orthodox Seminary of St. Petar of Cetinje.

He lives in Podgorica. He is a docent of history in the University of East Sarajevo. His father was a professor who worked throughout Yugoslavia, from the vicinity of Danilovgrad, and his mother an economist from the vicinity of Šavnik. He paternally descends from the Stamatović clan of the historical Katun nahiyah, and declares as ethnic Serb.

== Politics ==
He is the leader of the Serb Party of the Fatherland (Отаџбинска српска странка), which received 0.75% votes in the 2009 assembly election, and joined the "Serbian Unity"-coalition for the 2012 Montenegrin parliamentary election.

== Works ==
He has authored at least 14 works.

- Paštrovići-bedem Srpstva i Pravoslavlja (1992)
- Proslavljanje Svetog Save u Crnoj Gori (1994)
- Srpski etnički, jezički, vjerski i kulturni tragovi u Sjevernoj Albaniji (1994)
- O autokefalnosti crnogorske crkve (1995)
- Cetinjska Mitropolija kao Svetosavska Episkopska stolica (1998)
- Kratka istorija Mitropolije Crnogorsko-primorske (1219-1999) (1999)
- Četnički pokret u Crnoj Gori, 1941-45 (2004)
- Vojna privreda druge Jugoslavije (1945-1991)
- Ostroška golgota (2004)
