= Patriotic Coalition for Yugoslavia =

The Patriotic Coalition for Yugoslavia (Patriotska koalicija za Jugoslaviju) was a political alliance in Montenegro which ran in 2002 parliamentary election. The coalition members were:

- People's Socialist Party of Montenegro
- Serbian Radical Party
- Yugoslav Left

The coalition won 9,920 votes, or 2.85% and received none of the 75 seats, failing to pass the electoral threshold. It was dissolved shortly after the election.
