= Serbian–Montenegrin unionism =

Socio-political movement after the breakup of former Yugoslavia

Official flag of the State Union of Serbia and Montenegro (known as the Federal Republic of Yugoslavia from 1992-2003)

Proposed flag of the State Union of Serbia and Montenegro, designed as a mix of the colour shades of the red-navy blue-white tricolour flag of Serbia and the 1993–2004 red-light blue-white tricolour flag of Montenegro

Flag of Montenegro, 1993–2004

Serbian–Montenegrin unionism (Serbian: Српско-црногорски унионизам, romanized: Srpsko-crnogorski unionizam) is a socio-political movement which arose in Southeastern Europe after the breakup of Yugoslavia. It advocates Montenegro being in a political union with Serbia.

The Serbs and Montenegrins share common cultural traditions, including religion (majority of both ethnicities adhere to the Serbian Orthodox Church) and language (almost all of Serbs and relative majority of Montenegrins speak Serbian as their mother tongue). According to data from the 2023 Montenegrin census, 205,370 inhabitants or 32.9% of total population ethnically identified as "Serb", with 2,969 (<1%) identifying as "Serb-Montenegrin" or "Montenegrin-Serb". About two million people in Serbia have partial or full ancestry from present-day Montenegro, mostly tracing back to the 18th and 19th centuries, vast majority of whom identify ethnically as Serb, though many (particularly first- or second-generation descendants from Montenegro) also claim a fairly strong Montenegrin regional identity.

== History ==
=== Background ===
Close relations between Montenegro and Serbia are long-standing. There were various plans of restoring a Serbian state in the 18th century, with either Habsburg or Russian support, but these had ultimately failed. In 1736–37 Serbian Patriarch Arsenije IV envisioned an autonomous South Slavic state led by the "Illyrian-Rascian nation" (the Serbs) under the Habsburg Monarchy with its own government, army, nobility, churches and schools, with a similar status to Hungary, under the governance of the Serbian Patriarch. In 1782 the former Metropolitan Vasilije Petrović in Montenegro (s. 1744–1766) envisioned the restoration of the medieval Serbian state including territories in the Balkans and southern Habsburg Monarchy, while his successor Petar I Petrović's envoy to Russia presented the project of "kingdom of Old Rascia" in 1798. The archimandrite of Morača Arsenije Gagović submitted a proposal in 1803 to the Russian court regarding a "Slavic-Serb empire" ruled by a Russian prince, likely with consultation of Metropolitan Stefan Stratimirović. The latter sent a confidential memorandum to Russian emperor Alexander I in June 1804 (during the First Serbian Uprising) regarding the establishment of an independent Serbian monarchy under the House of Romanov encompassing Serbia, Bosnia, Montenegro, Herzegovina, Syrmia, the Bay of Kotor and much of Dalmatia.

In 1866, Prince Mihailo and Prince Nikola agreed that they would together fight for the liberation of the Serb people in Ottoman territory and to create a united state. The united monarch would be Mihailo, while the Petrović would remain in "great moral and material status".

=== Independent states ===
Montenegro and Serbia were officially recognized as independent states by the Ottoman Empire with the 1878 Treaty of San Stefano, following the Montenegrin–Ottoman War and Serbian–Ottoman Wars. In the late 19th century Montenegro's aspirations mirrored that of Serbia — unification and independence of Serb-inhabited lands. The Petrović-Njegoš dynasty tried to take the role as the Serb leader and unifier, but Montenegro's small size and weak economy led to the recognition of the primacy of the Karađorđević dynasty (in Serbia) in this respect.

The two fought as part of the Balkan League when it came to ending the Ottoman presence in Rumelia during the First Balkan War, and they fought alongside each other against Austria-Hungary and the German Empire during World War I.

=== Yugoslavia ===
Plans for unification were finally partially implemented after the war. The 1918 Podgorica Assembly concluded the decision to merge the Kingdom of Montenegro with the Kingdom of Serbia, followed by the creation of Yugoslavia. The Montenegrin monarchy was thereby removed, and opposition to the annexation culminated in the Christmas Uprising during 1919 in which a part the Montenegrin population demonstrated against the Serbian takeover.

When Yugoslavia was reformed after World War II, Montenegro became a constituent republic alongside a Serbia. When in 1991 and 1992, the most of Yugoslav republics voted for independence, Montenegro chose to continue a federation with Serbia as FR Yugoslavia (State Union of Serbia and Montenegro after 2003). In late 1990s, Montenegro, led by former pro-unionist Milo Đukanović, reversed its direction and began taking measures to distance itself from Serbia and seek independence. This sentiment, which grew popular among the Montenegrin populace, led to the 2006 independence referendum which ended in a majority vote for independence (55.5% of the vote, with the threshold for approval of independence set at a supermajority of 55%).

== Unionist political parties in Montenegro ==
Parliamentary parties:

- New Serb Democracy (national conservative, 9/81 MPs)
- Democratic People's Party (populist, 4/81 MPs)
- United Montenegro (conservative, 1/81 MP)

Non-parliamentary:

- Free Montenegro (right-wing populist)
- Democratic Party of Unity (national conservative)
- Democratic Serb Party (Christian democratic)

Formerly:

- Democratic Party of Socialists (1990–1997)
- Socialist People's Party (1997–2006)

Defunct:

- People's Party (1990–1998, 2001–2017)
- Party of Serb Radicals (1991–2020)
- Serb People's Party (1998–2009)
- Yugoslav United Left in Montenegro (1994–2001)
- People's Socialist Party (2001–2009)
- Democratic Centre of Boka (2009–2014)
- Serb List (2012–2020)

== See also ==
- State Union of Serbia and Montenegro
- Montenegro–Serbia relations
- Controversy over ethnic and linguistic identity in Montenegro
- Montenegrin language
- Montenegrin nationalism
- Serbian nationalism
- Yugoslavism

== Sources ==
- Bataković, Dušan T. (2006). "A Balkan-Style French Revolution? The 1804 Serbian Uprising in European Perspective". Balcanica (36).
- Jovanović, Radoman (1977). Politički odnosi Crne Gore i Srbije 1860-1878. Istorijski institut SR Crne Gore.
- Morrison, Kenneth (2009). Montenegro: A Modern History. I.B. Tauris. ISBN 978-1845117108.
- Roberts, Elizabeth (2007). Realm of the Black Mountain: A History of Montenegro. Ithaca, New York, USA: Cornell University Press. ISBN 978-0-8014-4601-6.
- Trbovich, Ana S. (2008). A Legal Geography of Yugoslavia's Disintegration. Oxford University Press. ISBN 978-0-19-533343-5.
- Vojvodić, Vaso (1979). Атанасије Николић: Опис радње. Vol. 7. Belgrade: Istorijski institut. pp. 151-.
