= Positive Montenegro =

Positive Montenegro Pozitivna Crna Gora Позитивна Црна Гора
- President: Darko Pajović
- Founders: Darko Pajović; Mladen Bojanić; Dritan Abazović
- Founded: 26 May 2012
- Dissolved: 11 October 2019
- Headquarters: Podgorica
- Ideology: Social liberalism; Economic liberalism; Pro-Europeanism
- Political position: Centre to centre-left
- Colours: Blue, orange

Website
- pozitivnacrnagora.me

Positive Montenegro (Montenegrin: Pozitivna Crna Gora; Позитивна Црна Гора) was a centrist, social-liberal political party in Montenegro. The party was founded in May 2012 by former environmental activist Darko Pajović.

== History ==
In the 2012 parliamentary elections, PCG became an opposition parliamentary party, winning 8.4% of popular vote, and 7 seats in Parliament. However, during its first parliamentary mandate the Party went through significant turbulence. During 2013 due to disagreement with the leadership of the party, one MP has stopped being a member of the party. In 2014, the Party encountered a big split, when three (of six remaining) party MPs left the party due to disagreements with party leader Pajović, after which Mladen Bojanić became an independent MP, and other two Dritan Abazović and Miloš Konatar was involved in the foundation of the new centre-left political party United Reform Action (URA).

In 2016 a fourth MP left the party and resigned as an MP due to disagreement with the party's decision to support Prime Minister Đukanović and his cabinet. On 27 January 2016, despite formerly being an opposition party, PCG provided the ruling Democratic Party of Socialists (DPS) with 3 votes necessary to win the government confidence vote, after the junior partner Social Democratic Party (SDP) left the government due to allegations of electoral fraud and political corruption, therefore forming a new ruling majority. Following this vote, national media and other opposition parties accused the party for deceiving and betraying its voters in order to save Prime Minister Đukanović. In turn, in June 2016 Pajović was appointed as the President of the Parliament, position formerly held by Ranko Krivokapić (SDP), and held the position until October 2016.

After PCG lost its parliamentary status at the October 2016 parliamentary election in which it won 1.32% of the votes, Pajović announced his resignation as the party leader, leaving Vice President Azra Jasavić to serve as acting President until the next party congress. The scheduled congress did not take place, former party president Pajović leave the PCG membership, prior 2018 when he took office as Montenegrin ambassador to China, as did acting president Jasavić shortly after, leaving the status of the party leadership unclear, and the party in the de facto process of dissolution. The party eventually dissolved prior to 2020.

== Legislative elections ==
Parliament of Montenegro
Year	Popular vote	% of popular vote	Overall seats won	Seat change	Government
2012	29,881	8.24%	7 / 81	▲7	Opposition 2012–2016
2012	29,881	8.24%	7 / 81	▲7	Government 2016
2016	5,062	1.32%	0 / 81	▼7	non-parliamentary

== Positions held ==
Major positions held by the Positive Montenegro members:

President of the Parliament of Montenegro	Years
Darko Pajović	2016
