= Movement for Changes =

Montenegrin political party

Movement for Changes Pokret za promjene Покрет за промјене
- Leader: Nebojša Medojević
- Founded: 17 July 2006
- Headquarters: Podgorica
- Ideology: Populism; National conservatism; Conspiracy theorism; Anti-immigration; Anti-European Union federalism; Pro-Europeanism
- Political position: Right-wing
- National affiliation: For the Future of Montenegro (2020–2023)
- European affiliation: European Conservatives and Reformists Party (2015–2022)
- International affiliation: The Movement; International Democrat Union (formerly)
- Colours: Navy, yellow, light blue
- Parliament: 0 / 81
- Local Parliaments: 7 / 844
- Mayors: 0 / 25

Website
- promjene.org

Movement for Changes (Montenegrin: Покрет за промјене, romanized: Pokret za promjene, PZP) is a right-wing populist and far-right political party in Montenegro. Its current leader is Nebojša Medojević, the party's founder.

== History ==
The party was founded by a group of economists and academics in September 2002 and was modeled after the Group 17 Plus in Serbia. It is led by Nebojša Medojević It operated as a non-governmental organization under the name Group for Changes (Montenegrin: Група за промјене, romanized: Grupa za promjene, GZP) until July 17, 2006, when it reconstituted itself as a political party.

In the 2006 Montenegrin independence referendum, PzP remained neutral and did not campaign for either option, their choice being an outcome without the Movement's involvement. Although prominent members of the party supported an independent Montenegrin state, they refused to join the Bloc for an Independent Montenegro, led by the DPS. After the referendum, they stated that they did so out of opposition to Đukanović's rule, which they see as corrupt and undemocratic. In the 2006 parliamentary election, the party ran for the first time, winning 11 of 81 seats. It became a vocal opposition party and forged links with the Serb People's Party and the Socialist People's Party of Montenegro in an attempt to unify the country's political opposition.

The party put forward amendments as part of the drafting process for the new Constitution of Montenegro, including the suggestion of official language status for the Serbian language alongside the existing proposal to declare Montenegrin the state language. The proposal was adopted by the ruling coalition, and PzP gave its support for the required two-thirds super-majority to adopt the Constitution. This support damaged its ties with other opposition parties to some extent. The presence of senior officials of the PzP at protests against Montenegrin recognition of Kosovo, in turn, alienated some Albanian supporters of the Movement. The party saw a fall in support at the 2009 parliamentary election, falling from 11 seats to 5. The Movement for Changes leader, Nebojša Medojević, was a candidate in the 2008 presidential election. He came in third, gathering nearly 17% of the vote. Since the 2012 parliamentary election, the party operates within the populist Democratic Front (DF) alliance.

PzP joined the Alliance of European Conservatives and Reformists in May 2015. In 2019, following Nebojsa Medojevic's meeting with Mischaël Modrikamen PzP announced its membership in The Movement, a coalition of populist parties chaired by former White House Chief Strategist Steve Bannon. In September 2020, the PzP left the DF parliamentary group.

== Ideology ==
Initially, the ideological profile of the Movement for Changes was a mix of fiscal conservatism, economic liberalism and anti-corruption in economic policy, atlanticism and pro-Europeanism in foreign policy, and moderate conservatism on social issues. Since founding, party has as a proclaimed goal the integration of their country into the European Union and political and economic reforms to bring it into line with European norms, PzP has also been a vocal advocate for Montenegro's NATO membership. Recently it takes a cautiously supportive attitude towards the country's EU integrations, opposing the European Union's further federalisation and frequently criticising the Brussels bureaucracy. The party, like its NGO predecessor, advocates as part a reform agenda change in the "undemocratic regime of the Democratic Party of Socialists" the party that has ruled Montenegro as the dominant partner in every coalition government since the end of communism, and the "dethroning" of multiple-term Prime-Minister and President Milo Đukanović. PzP also often referred to the Đukanovic regime as example of the Mafia state. In recent years, the Movement for Changes has increasingly employed a more antiglobalist, right-wing populist and anti-immigrant discourse, frequently depicting the Montenegrin society as fundamentally divided between ordinary citizens and a corrupt partocracy.

== Electoral performance ==
Election	Party leader	Performance				Alliance	Government
Election	Party leader	Votes	%	Seats	+/–	Alliance	Government
2006	Nebojša Medojević	44,483	13.13%	11 / 81	New	—	Opposition
2009	Nebojša Medojević	19,546	5.92%	5 / 81	▼6	—	Opposition
2012	Nebojša Medojević	82,773	22.82%	5 / 81	0	DF	Opposition
2016	Nebojša Medojević	77,784	20.32%	5 / 81	0	DF	Opposition
2020	Nebojša Medojević	133,261	32.55%	5 / 81	0	ZBCG	Support 2020–22
2020	Nebojša Medojević	133,261	32.55%	5 / 81	0	ZBCG	Opposition 2022–23
2023	Nebojša Medojević	1,989	0.66%	0 / 81	▼5	—	Extra-parliamentary

=== Presidential elections ===
President of Montenegro
Election	#	Candidate	1st round votes	%	2nd round	%	Notes
2008	3rd	Nebojša Medojević	54,874	16.64%	—	—	
2013	2nd	Miodrag Lekić	154,289	48.79%	—	—	Independent, support
2018	2nd	Mladen Bojanić	111,711	33.40%	—	—	Independent, support
2023	3rd	Andrija Mandić	65,385	19.32%	—	—	Democratic Front
