= Darko Pajović =

Montenegrin politician and diplomat, born 1972

- Дарко Пајовић
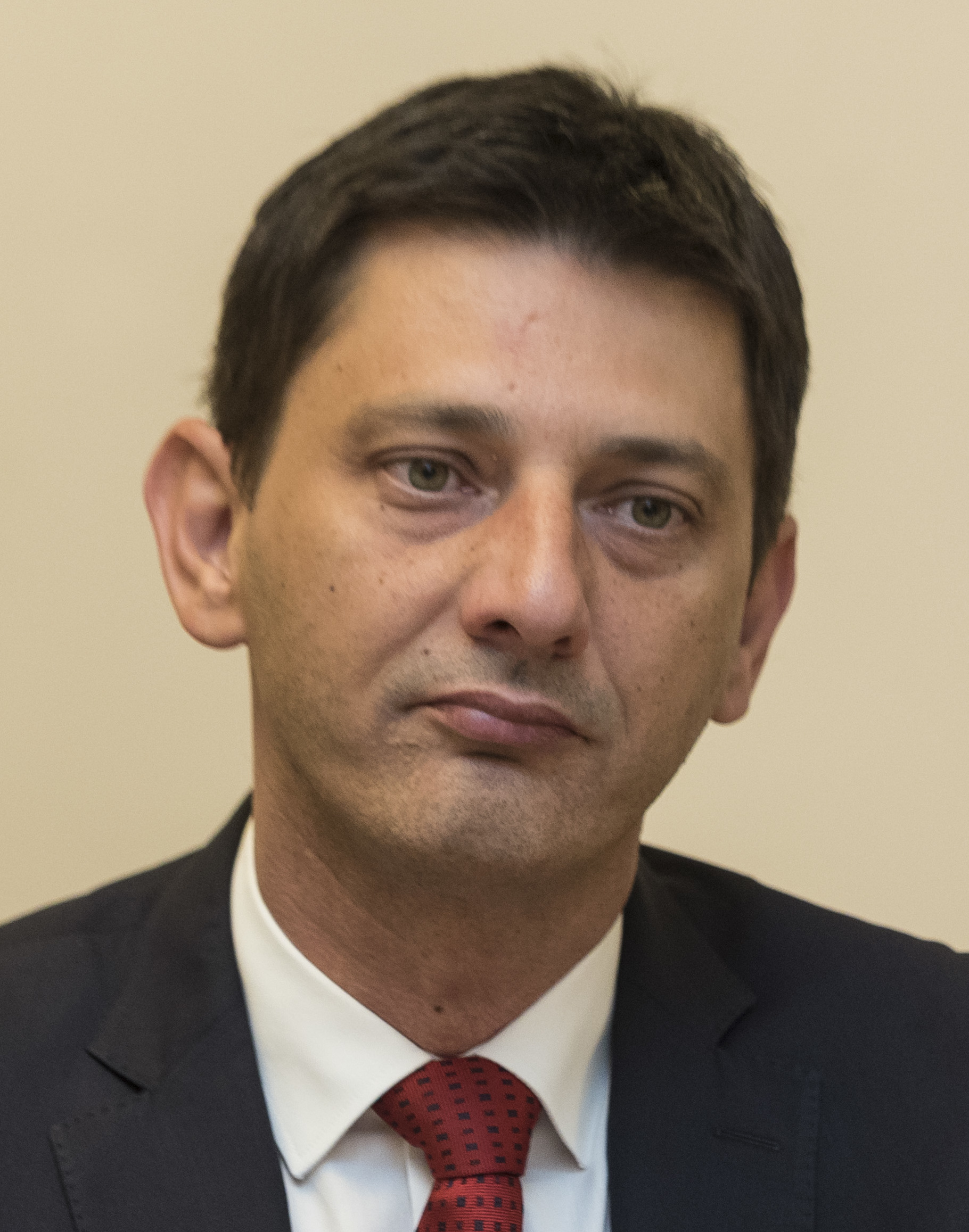
- Pajović in 2016

Ambassador of Montenegro to China
- In office 15 June 2018 – 24 February 2021
- President: Milo Đukanović

President of the Parliament
- In office 1 June 2016 – 7 November 2016
- Preceded by: Ranko Krivokapić
- Succeeded by: Ivan Brajović

Member of the Parliament
- In office 6 November 2012 – 7 November 2016
- President: Ranko Krivokapić

Personal details
- Born: 24 November 1972 Titograd, SR Montenegro, SFR Yugoslavia (now Podgorica, Montenegro)
- Party: Independent (before 2012; since 2019); Positive Montenegro (2012–2019)
- Education: University of Montenegro
- Profession: Biologist, politician, diplomat

Darko Pajović (Cyrillic: Дарко Пајовић; born 24 November 1972) is a Montenegrin diplomat and politician who has most recently served as the Ambassador of Montenegro to the People's Republic of China from 2018 to 2021. Previously, he served as the President of the Parliament of Montenegro, and was founder and leader of the political party Positive Montenegro.

== Education ==
He graduated at the University of Montenegro - Faculty of Mathematics and Natural Sciences, Department of Biology. He specialized in the field of In Vitro Fertilization (Human Reproduction) at the University Medical Centre Maribor, Slovenia. He is a graduate biologist-embryologist.

== Early career ==
He started his service as a professor of biology in High School in 2000. Hee has been working since 2003 as an embryologist in a Center for In Vitro Fertilization "Life", where in the laboratory conditions the first Montenegrin "test tube baby" was created. Since 2004, Pajović is a member of the European Society of Human Reproduction and Embryology (ESHRE). He began his social engagement as an activist in the civil sector.

He founded the non-governmental and non profit organization "Green Home" in 2000 and was the executive director until 2012. During these twelve years, was a member of the National Council for Sustainable Development, National Commission for Cooperation with UNESCO and member of the Commission on Environmental, Economic and Social Policy of the "International Union for Conservation of Nature" (IUCN).

== Political career ==
He was elected as the first President of the centrist political party "'Positive Montenegro" at the founding congress in May 2012. The same year in October Pajović led the list of Positive Montenegro in the parliamentary elections, which in turn became a parliamentary party, winning 7 seats (8.4%). He was a Member of Parliament for four years in the 25th assembly of the Parliament of Montenegro. During his mandate, he was a member of the Security and Defense Committee, the Anti-corruption Committee, the Committee on International Relations and Emigrants and Member of The Parliamentary Committee of the European Union and Montenegro for Stabilization and Association (POSP).

On 27 January 2016, Pajović's Positive Montenegro despite formerly being an opposition party, provided the ruling Democratic Party of Socialists (DPS) with 3 votes necessary to win the government confidence vote, after the junior partner Social Democratic Party (SDP) left the government due to allegations of electoral fraud and political corruption, therefore forming a new ruling majority. Following this vote, national media and other opposition parties accused Pajović's party for deceiving and betraying its voters in order to save Prime Minister Milo Đukanović. In turn, in June 2016 Darko Pajović was appointed as the President of the Parliament of Montenegro, a position formerly held by Ranko Krivokapić (SDP), and held the position until October 2016.

In October 2016, at the parliamentary election, he led the list of Positive Montenegro, which failed to pass a census to enter the Parliament of Montenegro. After publishing of the results the same evening he resigned as President of the Positive Montenegro, leaving Vice President Azra Jasavić to serve as acting President until the next party congress. The scheduled congress did not take place, Pajović left party membership, prior 2018 when he took office as Montenegrin ambassador to PR China, as did acting president Jasavić shortly after, leaving the status of the party leadership unclear, Positive Montenegro eventually dissolved in late 2019. Following the results of 2020 election, which resulted in a victory for the opposition parties and the fall from power of the ruling DPS, after ruling country for 30 years, Pajović was removed from the office of ambassador in February 2021, after months of disputing the new government and refusing to leave the office.
