= Mladen Bojanić =

Montenegrin politician

Mladen Bojanić Младен Бојанић
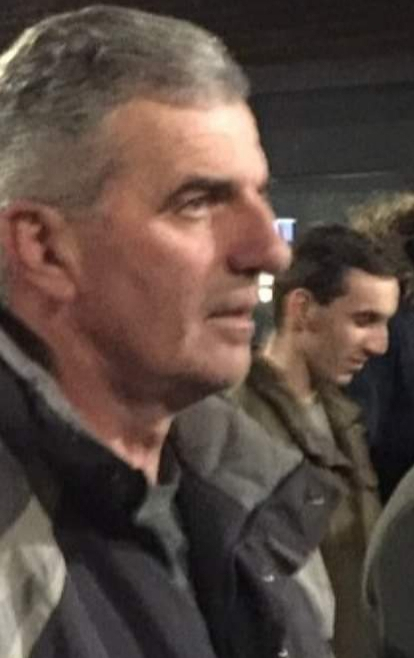
- Mladen Bojanić in February 2019, at anti-corruption protest in Podgorica.

Minister of Capital Investments
- Incumbent
- Assumed office 24 November 2020
- Prime Minister: Zdravko Krivokapić
- Preceded by: Osman Nurković (as Minister of Transportation and Maritime Affairs)

Member of Parliament
- In office 14 October 2012 – 16 October 2016
- President: Ranko Krivokapić; Darko Pajović

Personal details
- Born: 14 November 1962 (age 63) Titograd, FPR Yugoslavia (now Podgorica, Montenegro)
- Party: Independent
- Other political affiliations: Positive Montenegro (2012–2014); URA (affiliated)
- Education: University of Montenegro
- Profession: Economist, politician

Mladen Bojanić (Serbian Cyrillic: Младен Бојанић; born 14 October 1962) is a Montenegrin economist, politician and former MP. He was one of the founders and former secretary general of socially liberal Positive Montenegro (PCG) party. He ran for President of Montenegro at the 2018 elections. Since November 2020 Bojanić is currently the Minister of Capital Investments in the Government of Montenegro and the cabinet of Zdravko Krivokapić since December 2020.

== Biography ==
Bojanić, was born in 1962 in Titograd (present-day Podgorica), Montenegro, at that time part of the Socialist Republic of Montenegro of SFR Yugoslavia. He graduated at the Faculty of Economics at the Veljko Vlahović University in Titograd. He was a member of the Board for the Association of Banks, other Financial Organizations and Insurance Companies of the Chamber of Commerce of Montenegro. In 2011, he was Vice-President of the Assembly of the Council of Economists of Montenegro.

== Political career ==
He decided to enter political life in 2012 by joining the newly founded social liberal Positive Montenegro party. He served as the party secretary general, which was one of the key positions in the party and one of the party representatives in the Parliament of Montenegro. In 2014, he decided to leave the party due to disagreements with party leader Darko Pajović and decided to continue activities as an independent MP.

In 2016, he was part of Resistance to Hopelessness, an anti-establishment and military neutrality political movement and support Democratic Front list for 2016 parliamentary election. On 9 March 2018, the presidency of Democratic Front decides to support Bojanić to run for president of Montenegro at April 2018 presidential election, his candidacy was previously proposed by Democratic Montenegro and United Reform Action. Socialist People's Party, United Montenegro and the Democratic Front also supported his candidacy.

During the campaign, he declared himself a Montenegrin by ethnicity, speaker of the Serbian language and a believer of the Serbian Orthodox Metropolitanate of Montenegro and the Littoral. At the election, Bojanić came second, behind Milo Đukanović, with 33.40% of the vote. He was part of 2019 anti-corruption protests and 2019-2020 Clerical protests.

== See also ==
- 2018 Montenegrin presidential election
- 2019 Montenegrin anti-corruption protests
