= Serb People's Party (Montenegro) =

Defunct political party in Montenegro

Serb People's Party Српска народна странка Srpska narodna stranka
- Leader: Andrija Mandić
- Founder: Božidar Bojović
- Founded: 1997
- Dissolved: 2009
- Split from: People's Party
- Merged into: New Serb Democracy
- Headquarters: Podgorica
- Ideology: National conservatism Serbian-Montenegrin unionism Serbian nationalism
- Political position: Right-wing
- Colours: Red, Blue, White (Serbian tricolor)

Website
- www.sns.co.me

The Serb People's Party (Serbian: Српска народна странка, СНС / Srpska narodna stranka, SNS) was a political party in Montenegro.

The SNS was led by Andrija Mandić. At the last legislative elections in Montenegro, on September 10, 2006, the Serb List, led by the SNS, won 12 out of 81 seats. It was then the largest political group in the Parliament of Montenegro right after the ruling Democratic Party of Socialists-Social Democratic Party coalition.

In January 2009, it merged with to People's Socialist Party of Montenegro (NSS) to form the New Serb Democracy.

== Overview ==
The SNS was an ethnic Serb party that promoted the rights of the Serb ethnic group against what it sees as state-sponsored discrimination. Unlike the pro-federalist Socialist People's Party of Montenegro (SNP) which is left-oriented (being social-democratic), the SNS is focused primarily on representing the interests of Serb people in Montenegro around a center-right cultural conservative program. It presented itself as one of the successors to the old People's Party in the founded in 1906 in the Kingdom of Montenegro, alongside the current People's Party of Montenegro.

Its platform consisted of protection of the ethnic Serb community in the smaller republic against what it sees as the apartheid-like policies of the government of Milo Đukanović whom it has vehemently opposed since its creation. The SNS also supported a restoration of tighter relations between Serbia and Montenegro in conjunction with Euro-Atlantic integration.

In 1997 the People's Party of Montenegro entered the To live better broad anti-Bulatović and anti-Milošević political alliance of Milo Đukanović. Numerous members of NS saw it betraying its own basis by siding with its greatest enemy and now also the enemy of the Serb people. NS CG had also distanced itself from its old Serbian nationalistic aims a lot and has become quite moderate, and these same members accused the party's political leadership under Novak Kilibarda for abandoning the general interests of the Serbs. It is thus they left the party and formed the Serbian People's Party of Montenegro (Serbian: Српска народна странка Црне Горе, СНС ЦГ / Srpska narodna stranka Crne Gore, SNS CG), which claims to continue to original policies of NS. The leader of the fraction, Božidar Bojović, was elected the SNS's first leader. The fraction also supported Momir Bulatovic unlike mainstream NS which sided with Milo Djukanovic in the epic 1997-1998 presidential and party DPS changes. SNS CG refused to sign on 1 September 1997 the agreement of joint overseeing of the voting with representatives from political parties to evade repetition of future vote-balloting because they fiercely opposed any collaboration with Djukanovic, therefore cutting itself from inspecting the voting process.

The Serb People's Party ran on the 1998 Montenegrin parliamentary election alone. It suffered a great defeat and lost enthusiasm, because it failed to pass the census and enter the Parliament.

The Serbian People's Party decided to participate in the 24 October 2000 election for the Parliament of the Federal Republic, unlike the DPS ruling coalition of Đukanović which instituted a republican-sponsored boycott alleging the amended Constitution to promote inequality of Montenegro within the Yugoslavian federation (which the SNS sole parliamentarian at the time, vice-chairman Novica Stanić, voted against). In fact the Republican government of Đukanović made public threats to the 25% of electors who dared come out to vote. As a result of an agreement with the SNP, the SNS secured 2 seats of the Montenegrin portion of 30 seats in the 138-strong House of Citizens (with the remaining 108 belonging to Serbia). And at the election for the Chamber of Republics, SNS got even more - 9,494 or 7.5%. It secured a single seat for the 20 in the Montenegrin Dome of the 40-seat-strong Chamber of Republics. After Montenegrin independence referendum and proclamation of Montenegro's independence, SNS has challenged the referendum as being rigged and fraud-ridden. Furthermore, it started a petition to make gaining of Serbian citizenship possible for Serbs from Montenegro. The SNS has stated that it will recognize and respect the Republic of Montenegro to the degree that it respects the civic and human rights of a third of its populace (the Serbs). The SNS has refused to vote in favor of the new Montenegrin Constitution adopted in October 2007, with even one of its parliamentarians, spokesman Dobrilo Dedeić publicly tearing the document in parliament, and vowing to fight against the state-sponsored policy of discrimination to the very end. Furthermore, challenging a law which would make it illegal to hold dual citizenship, party leader Mandić has also publicly, in parliament, acknowledged to have become a dual Serbian citizen, challenging Podgorica to act on its threats.

SNS began efforts to unite the Serb List into a single party, which would be more moderate in its position, for it to become a more desirable partner to civic and pro-Montenegrin opposition. However, the initiative has had moderate success, as Democratic Serb Party did not comply with merger, and few smaller Serb parties emerged from Serb List.

== Electoral performance ==
=== Parliamentary elections ===
Year	Popular vote	% of popular vote	Overall seats won	Seat change	Alliance	Government
1998	6,606	1.9%	0 / 75	Steady	—	extra-parliamentary
2001	148,513	40.56%	3 / 75	▲3	ZZJ	opposition
2002	133,894	38.4%	6 / 75	▲3	ZZP	opposition
2006	47,683	14.68%	9 / 81	▲3	SL	opposition

=== Presidential elections ===
President of Montenegro
Election year	#	Candidate	1st round vote	%	2nd round vote	%	Notes
2008	2nd	Andrija Mandić	64,473	19.55%	—	—	Serb List alliance common candidate
