= 2006 Montenegrin parliamentary election =

- 10 September 2006
- Turnout: 71.37% (▼6.10pp)
Party	Leader	Vote %	Seats	+/–
ECG	Milo Đukanović	48.62	41	+2
Serb List	Andrija Mandić	14.68	12	+6
SNP–NS–DSS	Predrag Bulatović	14.07	11	−13
PzP	Nebojša Medojević	13.13	11	New
LP–BS	Miodrag Živković	3.76	3	New
DSCG–PDP	Osman Rexha	1.29	1	0
UDSH	Gëzim Hajdinaga	1.09	1	0
ASH	Vasilj Siništaj	0.78	1	New
This lists parties that won seats. See the complete results below.
Prime Minister before	Prime Minister after
Milo Đukanović; DPS	Željko Šturanović; DPS

Constitutional Assembly elections were held in the newly-independent Republic of Montenegro on 10 September 2006. Prime Minister Milo Đukanović's Coalition for a European Montenegro (based around the Democratic Party of Socialists) won a majority in Parliament, winning 41 of the 81 seats. The opposition blocs together won 34 seats; 12 for the Serb List (SL) and 11 each for the Socialist People's Party (SNP)-led list and the Movement for Changes (PzP). Other seats were won by parties representing national minorities. As the opposition conceded defeat, DPS leader Đukanović stated "These elections showed that Montenegro is stable and firm on its European path."

== Electoral system ==
Of the 81 seats in Parliament, 76 were elected by proportional representation in a nationwide constituency and five were elected in a special constituency for the Albanian minority. The electoral threshold was set at 3% and seats allocated using the d'Hondt method. Closed lists were used with a single list for both constituencies, although parties only had to award half their seats according to the order of the list, with the remaining half free for them to allocate.

== Campaign ==
The main campaign issues were the economy, unemployment, the environment and European integration. The government campaigned on the recent successful independence referendum and international recognition of the country. Opposition parties criticised the performance of state institutions, as well as criticising their politicisation, but suffered from internal divisions and the formation of new parties. Although the Đukanović government made a decision not to pay for parties' election campaigns using state funds, it eventually relented and funding was distributed equally between all parties.

== Opinion polls ==
One opinion poll leading up to the elections suggested Đukanović's Democratic Party of Socialists (DPS) could win as much as 30%-45% of the vote, but that would still leave him needing a coalition partner. According to the same poll, the three pro-Serb opposition alliances could each win between 10% and 20% of the vote - potentially enough to unseat the Prime Minister if they succeed in uniting against him. All three claimed their main priority was to replace Đukanović. However, the Prime Minister himself did not rule out joining forces with the main opposition bloc, led by the Socialist People's Party.

== Results ==
Party	Votes	%	Seats			
Party	Votes	%	General	Albanian	Total	+/–
European Montenegro	164,737	48.62	39	2	41	+2
Serb List	49,730	14.68	12	0	12	+6
SNP–NS–DSS	47,683	14.07	11	0	11	–13
Movement for Changes	44,483	13.13	11	0	11	New
Liberals and Bosniak Party	12,748	3.76	3	0	3	New
DSCG–PDP Coalition	4,373	1.29	0	1	1	0
Democratic Union of Albanians	3,693	1.09	0	1	1	0
Civic List	2,906	0.86	0	0	0	New
Albanian Alternative	2,656	0.78	0	1	1	New
Communists of Montenegro	2,343	0.69	0	0	0	New
New Democratic Force	2,197	0.65	0	0	0	New
Democratic Party of Montenegro	1,286	0.38	0	0	0	New
Total	338,835	100.00	76	5	81	+6
Valid votes	338,835	98.00				
Invalid/blank votes	6,922	2.00				
Total votes	345,757	100.00				
Registered voters/turnout	484,430	71.37				
Source: Nohlen & Stöver
