= Democratic Centre of Boka =

Democratic Centre of Boka Demokratski centar Boke Демократски центар Боке
- Leader: Dejan Ćorović
- Founded: 2008
- Dissolved: 2018
- Split from: People's Party
- Headquarters: Herceg Novi
- Ideology: Boka regionalism Serbian nationalism
- Political position: Right-wing

Website
- http://www.dcboke.com

Democratic Centre of Boka (Serbian: Демократски центар Боке / Demokratski centar Boke) is a former minor Serb nationalist political party in Montenegro. The party was based in the coastal town of Herceg Novi.

The party was led by Dejan Ćorović. At the municipal elections held in Montenegro on 6 April 2008, DCB won 1 out of 35 seats in the Parliament of the Municipality of Herceg Novi. However, at the following local election held in 2012, DCB did not enter the Municipal Parliament, receiving only 141 votes. The party failed to participate in 2014 and 2017 local elections.

== History ==
In January 2008, due to a disagreement with irregular procedures with the majority of the members of the Municipal Board of the People's Party, Dejan Ćorović resigned his position as a member of the party. With around 170 dissidents of the People's Party, he founded the Democratic Centre of Boka, accusing NS for corruption. In September 2012, the party joined the Srpska sloga (Serb Unity) political alliance, headed by Jovan Markuš.

In January 2018, Ministry of Public Administration announced that the party has been deleted from the party register, since it has ceased to exist.
