= Democratic Serb Party (Montenegro) =

Democratic Serb Party Demokratska srpska stranka Демократска српска странка
- Leader: Dragica Perović
- Founders: Božidar Bojović; Ranko Kadić
- Founded: 2003
- Split from: Serb People's Party
- Headquarters: Podgorica
- Ideology: National conservatism Christian democracy Serbian–Montenegrin unionism
- Political position: Right-wing
- Parliament: 0 / 81
- Local Parliaments: 3 / 844

Website
- www.dsscg.com

The Democratic Serb Party (Serbian: Демократска српска странка, Demokratska srpska stranka; DSS) is a minor conservative political party in Montenegro, representing the Serbs of Montenegro.

== History ==
The Democratic Serb Party was formed in 2003 following a split from the Serb People's Party led by Božidar Bojović, who was the first party president, and Ranko Kadić, first vice president and his subsequent successor.

At the legislative elections held in March 2009, DSS formed a pre-election coalition with the People's Party, but the coalition failed to gain parliamentary status, winning 2,9% of the votes, just below the 3% electoral threshold. At the next election DSS participated in a nationalist coalition Serb National Alliance along with Party of Serb Radicals and Serb National Alliance, which won only 0,85% of votes. In August 2016, the party joined the right-wing Democratic Front (DF) for the 2016 election, and supported ZBCG list for 2020 election.

== Electoral performance ==
=== Parliamentary election ===
Election	Party leader	Performance				Alliance	Government
Election	Party leader	Votes	%	Seats	+/–	Alliance	Government
2006	Ranko Kadić	47,683	14.07%	2 / 81	New	With SNP-NS	Opposition
2009	Ranko Kadić	9,448	2.9%	0 / 81	▼2	With NS	Extra-parliamentary
2012	Ranko Kadić	3,085	0.85%	0 / 81	0	With SSR	Extra-parliamentary
2016	Dragica Perović	77,784	20.32%	0 / 81	0	With DF	Extra-parliamentary
2020	Dragica Perović	133,267	32.55%	0 / 81	0	with ZBCG	Extra-parliamentary
2023	Dragica Perović	3,630	1.20%	0 / 81	0	with NK	Extra-parliamentary
