= Miomir Mugoša =

Montenegrin politician

Miomir Mugoša Миомир Мугоша
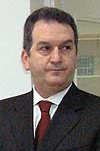
- Miomir Mugoša in 2003

Mayor of Podgorica
- In office July 2000 – June 2014
- Preceded by: Mihailo Burić
- Succeeded by: Migo Stijepović

Personal details
- Born: 23 July 1950 (age 75) Cetinje, Montenegro (then Yugoslavia)
- Party: Democratic Party of Socialists

Miomir Mugoša (Montenegrin Cyrillic: Миомир Мугоша; born 23 July 1950) is a Montenegrin physician and politician. He has been the longest-serving mayor of Podgorica, the capital of Montenegro, from 2000 to 2014. He also served as the president of FK Budućnost Podgorica, main soccer team in Podgorica.

== Biography ==
Born in Cetinje, Mugoša completed primary school and high school in Podgorica, and graduated from the University of Belgrade's School of Medicine. He specialized in general surgery, with an emphasis on hepatobiliary surgery.

Mugoša worked in the emergency service of the health center and at the Surgery Clinic of the Clinical Center in Montenegro. He performed a duty of the Director of the Clinical Center in Montenegro in the period of 1996–97. Mayor Mugoša is the minister with the longest service in the Government of Montenegro - from 1990 to November 2000 he covered the position of the Minister of Health with the exception of 3 months during which he acted as the Minister of Labor and Social Welfare.

Mugoša has been a member of the Democratic Party of Socialists of Montenegro (DPS) since its founding. He was a member of the main board of DPS in Donja Gorica.

He lives in Podgorica at Mareza in a family house, on the property of his ancestors.

Mugoša was recently involved in scandal with abusive behavior regarding journalist of local newspaper Vijesti Mihailo Jovović. According to some sources the journalist of "Vijesti" Jovovic was beaten and his redactor was also involved.

On September 13, 2006, Mugoša was reelected to manage the municipality of Podgorica for a second term. In 2010, while DPS failed to win absolute majority of seats in Podgorica local assembly, he managed to obtain support from two opposition delegates, and secure a third term in the office. His mandate ended on June 24, 2014, and DPS chose not to appoint him as a candidate for a fourth term.
