= Socialist People's Party of Montenegro =

Political party in Montenegro

Socialist People's Party Socijalistička narodna partija Социјалистичка народна партија
- Abbreviation: SNP
- Leader: Vladimir Joković
- Founder: Momir Bulatović
- Founded: 18 February 1998
- Split from: Democratic Party of Socialists
- Headquarters: Podgorica
- Ideology: Social democracy; Social conservatism; Left-conservatism; Pro-Europeanism
- Political position: Fiscal: Centre-left; Social: Centre-right
- National affiliation: For the Future of Montenegro (2020–2022)
- European affiliation: Party of European Socialists (cooperation)
- Parliament: 2 / 81
- Mayors: 2 / 25
- Local Parliaments: 56 / 844

Party flag

Website
- snp.co.me

The Socialist People's Party of Montenegro (Serbo-Croatian: Социјалистичка народна партија Црне Горе, СНП ЦГ; Socijalistička narodna partija Crne Gore SNP CG) is a political party in Montenegro. It is a social-democratic and socially conservative party, that is positioned on the centre-left on the political spectrum with regard to economic matters. It is supportive of accession of Montenegro to the European Union, and was historically supportive of Serbian–Montenegrin unionism.

== History ==
=== Origins ===
In the late 1990s a rift inside the ruling Democratic Party of Socialists of Montenegro came out. In the 1997 Montenegrin presidential election, aside from the then-President of the Republic and the Party Momir Bulatović, the Premier of Montenegro and party vice-president Milo Đukanović ran too, leading a reforming wing opposing mainstream DPS CG's political attitudes regarding support of Serbian president Slobodan Milošević. The ruling parties of the Republic of Serbia (the constitutive partner of the Federal Republic of Yugoslavia like the Republic of Montenegro), SPS and SRS, soundly and firmly stood on Momir Bulatović's side, while the opposition in Serbia (SPO, DS, DSS and GS) gave their support for Đukanović. It is so that the DPS — Momir Bulatović had officially seceded from the other branch of the DPS, but Bulatović's supporters had only retained a majority in 5 municipalities, while the other 16 in which DPS reigned voiced their support of Đukanović.

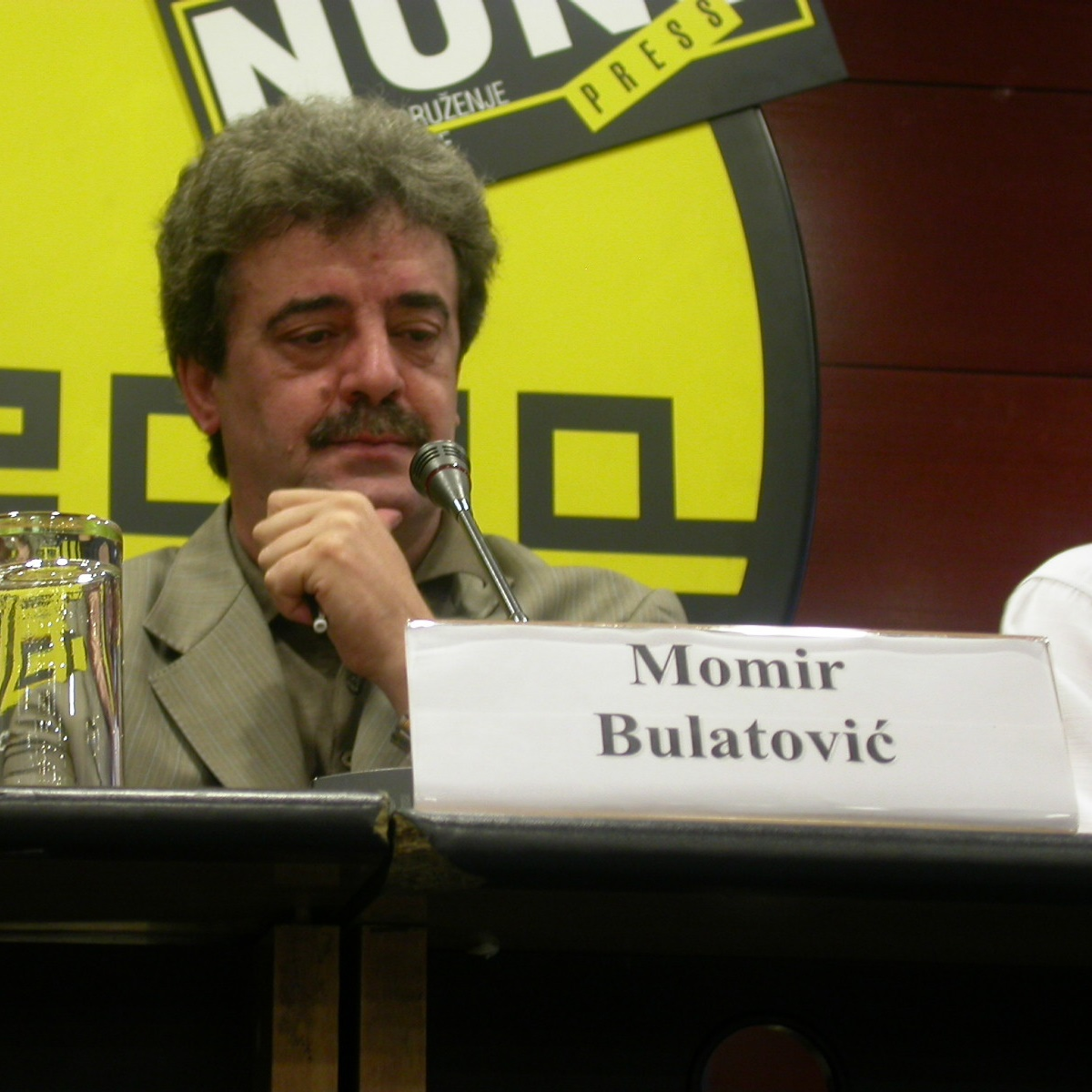
Momir Bulatović, founder and the first leader of the Socialist People's Party of Montenegro.

Momir presented in the political campaign that his main goal was the preservation of the FRY and the maintaining of the present political status in Montenegro. In the first round on 5 October 1997 Momir Bulatović won receiving most votes, 147,615 or 47.45%, but lost to opposing Milo in the second round on 19 October 1997 when he won 169,257 or only 49.2%. Momir refused to recognize the results, calling them unrealistic and forged — considering that every single of the other candidates that ran in the first round voiced their support for in Momir in the second. One of the main controversial moments, as criticized by OEBS, is that Milo as Premier, managed to seize control of the Montenegrin national media (e.g. TV CG). On the other side, the Serbian national media had also been unbalanced, promoting Momir. The other unbalancing issue is that Milo, as Premier, was in a much stronger position to further his personal goals, controlling the government (the President had very little authority in effect) and had seized control over most of DPS' local authorities, while Democratic Party of Socialists — Momir Bulatović got only 5 of total DPS' 21.

On the other hand, Momir enjoyed the support of Serbia and the Federal Yugoslav government itself. With the huge clashes between Momir and Milo, the election respected minimal democratic standards. However, with eventual loss at the election, the rift between the two wings was final.

=== First period ===
By 2000, Milošević began to lose his ground in Serbia, and it became apparent that he no longer had support either within the international community or his own country. However, Momir Bulatović was still a close ally of Milošević, and that fact led to a split within the SNP on whether to stay loyal to Milošević or to become a party with a more democratic image. In 2001 the pro-European and democratic wing led by Predrag Bulatović prevailed and he became SNP's president. The party continued to be a proponent of the union with Serbia, while the old-style pro-Milošević faction of politicians formed the People's Socialist Party under Momir Bulatović.

=== Second period ===
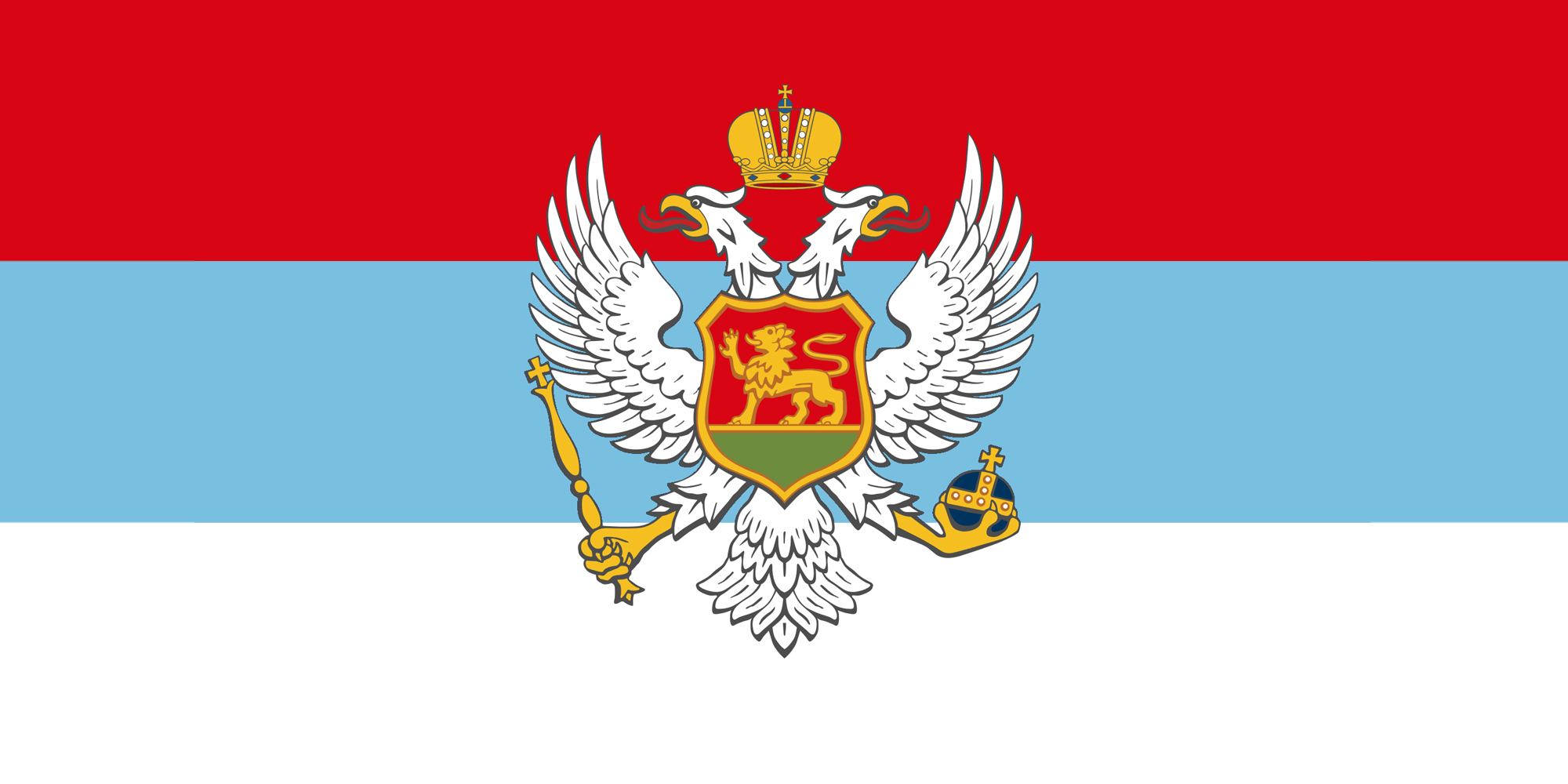
2006 Socialist People's Party's Flag of Montenegro proposal.

As some ethnic Serb parties took advantage of the SNP's new orientation and attracted some voters, SNP became the strongest opposition party in Montenegro. It was the leader of the Movement for European Union of Serbia and Montenegro, which eventually failed to preserve the union with Serbia. SNP avoided to explicitly state its rejection of the 2006 Montenegrin independence referendum results, but it refused to attend the country's inauguration ceremonies. Other pro-union opposition parties openly refused to recognize the results.

In the first parliamentary elections in independent Montenengro, SNP saw the largest downfall of the number of its voters since the founding of the party. The coalition it had led in 2002 elections fell from 30 to 11 seats in the Montenegrin parliament. SNP lost its status of leader of Montenegrin opposition in favour of the Serbian List led by the Serbian People's Party of Montenegro (12 seats) and Movement for Changes (11 seats). This resulted in resignation of party's leader Predrag Bulatović, as well as the three vice-presidents.

=== Third period ===
On 27 December 2006, Srđan Milić was announced new party president, after gaining the majority of General Party Congress votes, and beating the other two candidates, Dragiša Pešić and Borislav Globarević, representing the victory of the expressly pro-EU program. SNP CG adopted a strongly civic social-democratic political course and broke off the traditional coalition with the People's Party and the Democratic Serb Party.

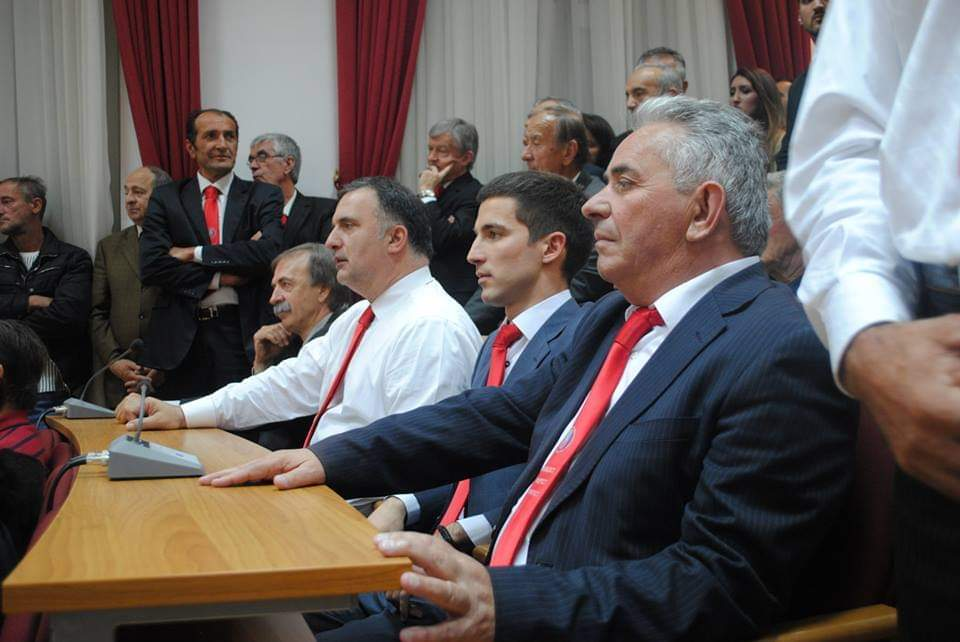
Socialist People's Party leadership, under Srđan Milić in April 2014.

In the negotiations for the new Montenegrin Constitution, SNP forged a united political alliance of practically the entire Opposition with the Movement for Changes, both of its old partners the People's Party and Democratic Serb Party, the members of the Serb List alliance, the Bosniak Party and the ethnic Albanian Democratic League in Montenegro and Albanian Alternative with a united platform, preparing to boycott the referendum. However, NS, DSS, DSCG and SL retreated from negotiations with the opposition. On the other hand, PzP, BS and AA accepted independently from the alliance terms of the ruling coalition and are ready to give the required super-majority to adopt the constitution. SNP submitted 33 amendments and still did not include the option to support the constitution as well, under the condition that its amendments — previously included in the Opposition's demands — were adopted.

The reforms of Srđan Milić worked well for SNP, as in the 2009 Montenegrin parliamentary election it won 16 seats in the Parliament of Montenegro, becoming once again the biggest sole opposition party.

Before the 2012 Montenegrin parliamentary election the right-wing faction of the party led by their former president Predrag Bulatović left the party and joined the Democratic Front alliance. In the election, the party ran independently and won only 11.06% of the votes, and 9 seats.

In February 2015, the party faction led by Aleksa Bečić split from the SNP due to disagreements with party leader Milić, having decided to form a new political party, Democratic Montenegro.

In September 2016, SNP decided to enter the Key Coalition with DEMOS and URA in order to participate at the forthcoming parliamentary election. The Coalition was the third-ranked electoral list with 11.05% of the votes and 9 seats, out of which SNP won only 3. Some time afterwards, member Aleksandar Damjanović left the parliamentary group.

=== Fourth period ===
Party president Srđan Milić tendered his resignation after 11 years of leading the party for a catastrophically poor result at the 2016 parliamentary elections. Vladimir Joković, supported by the party faction led by former president of the party parliamentary club Aleksandar Damjanović and current mayor of Berane Dragoslav Šćekić, was surprisingly elected President of the party at the General Congress held on 13 August 2017, in front of favored Snežana Jonica, supported by the fraction close to former party leader Milić. In mid-2019, the centre-left party faction led by Jonica split from the SNP due to ideological disagreements with the new party leadership, having decided to form a new political group, Socialists of Montenegro (Socijalisti Crne Gore, SCG).

On 1 May 2019 SNP signed an agreement with the Independent parliamentary group of Parliament of Montenegro composed of United Montenegro (UCG), Workers' Party (RP) and two independent MPs, including former SNP high-ranking member Aleksandar Damjanović, forming new catch-all alliance named For the Benefit of All. The alliance eventually dissolved prior the parliamentary election in August 2020, and all three parties decided to join a pre-election coalition with right-wing Democratic Front (DF) alliance, under the name For the Future of Montenegro, employing a more significant cultural and socially conservative discourse, supporting 2019–2020 clerical protests in Montenegro and Serbian Orthodox Church rights in Montenegro.

With the end of the Krivokapić government, the party took part in the new government led by Dritan Abazović.

== Presidents of the Socialist People's Party ==
No.	President	Age	Term start	Term end	Time in office
1	Momir Bulatović	1956–2019	19 October 1997	24 September 2000	2 years, 341 days
2	Predrag Bulatović	born 1956	24 September 2000	26 November 2006	6 years, 63 days
3	Srđan Milić	born 1965	26 November 2006	13 August 2017	10 years, 260 days
4	Vladimir Joković	born 1967	13 August 2017	Incumbent	9 years, 12 days

== Electoral performance ==
=== Parliamentary elections ===
Election	Party leader	Performance				Alliance	Government
Election	Party leader	Votes	%	Seats	+/–	Alliance	Government
1998	Momir Bulatović	123,957	35.62%	29 / 78	New	—	Opposition
2001	Predrag Bulatović	148,513	40.56%	21 / 77	▼8	ZZP	Opposition
2002	Predrag Bulatović	133,894	38.43%	19 / 75	▼2	ZZP	Opposition
2006	Predrag Bulatović	47,683	14.07%	8 / 81	▼11	NS–DSS	Opposition
2009	Srđan Milić	54,547	16.83%	16 / 81	▲8	—	Opposition
2012	Srđan Milić	40,131	11.06%	9 / 81	▼7	—	Opposition 2012–16
2012	Srđan Milić	40,131	11.06%	9 / 81	▼7	—	Support 2016
2016	Srđan Milić	42,295	11.05%	3 / 81	▼6	Ključ	Opposition
2020	Vladimir Joković	133,261	32.55%	5 / 81	▲2	with ZBCG	Support 2020–22
2020	Vladimir Joković	133,261	32.55%	5 / 81	▲2	with ZBCG	Government 2022–23
2023	Vladimir Joković	9,472	3.13%	2 / 81	▼3	SNP–Demos	Government

=== Federal elections ===
Chamber of Citizens of the Federal Assembly of Yugoslavia
Year	Popular vote	% of pop. vote	Seats	Montenegrin seats	Changes	Government	Leader / carrier
1997	Split from DPS	(Split from DPS)	16 / 138	16 / 30	▲16	coalition gov't	Momir Bulatović
2000	104,198	83.10%	28 / 138	28 / 30	▲12	coalition gov't	Zoran Žižić

=== Presidential elections ===
President of Montenegro
Election year	Candidate	#	1st round vote	% of vote	#	2nd round vote	% of vote	Note
1997	Momir Bulatović	1st	147,610	47.44%	2nd	169,257	49.20%	
2003	Election boycott	—N/a	Election boycott		—N/a	Election boycott		
2008	Srđan Milić	4th	39,316	11.92%	—N/a	—	—	
2013	Miodrag Lekić	2nd	154,289	48.79%	—N/a	—	—	Independent; supports
2018	Mladen Bojanić	2nd	111,711	33.40%	—N/a	—	—	Independent; supports

== Positions held ==
Major positions held by Socialist People's Party of Montenegro members:

Prime Minister of FR Yugoslavia	Years
Momir Bulatović	1998–2000
Zoran Žižić	2000–2001
Dragiša Pešić	2001–2003
President of the Chamber of Republics of the Federal Assembly of Yugoslavia	Years
Srđa Božović	1997–2003
President of Montenegro	Years
Momir Bulatović	1997–1998
President of the Parliament of Montenegro	Years
Danijela Đurović	2022–2023
