= Andrija Mandić =

President of the parliament of Montenegro

- Андрија Мандић
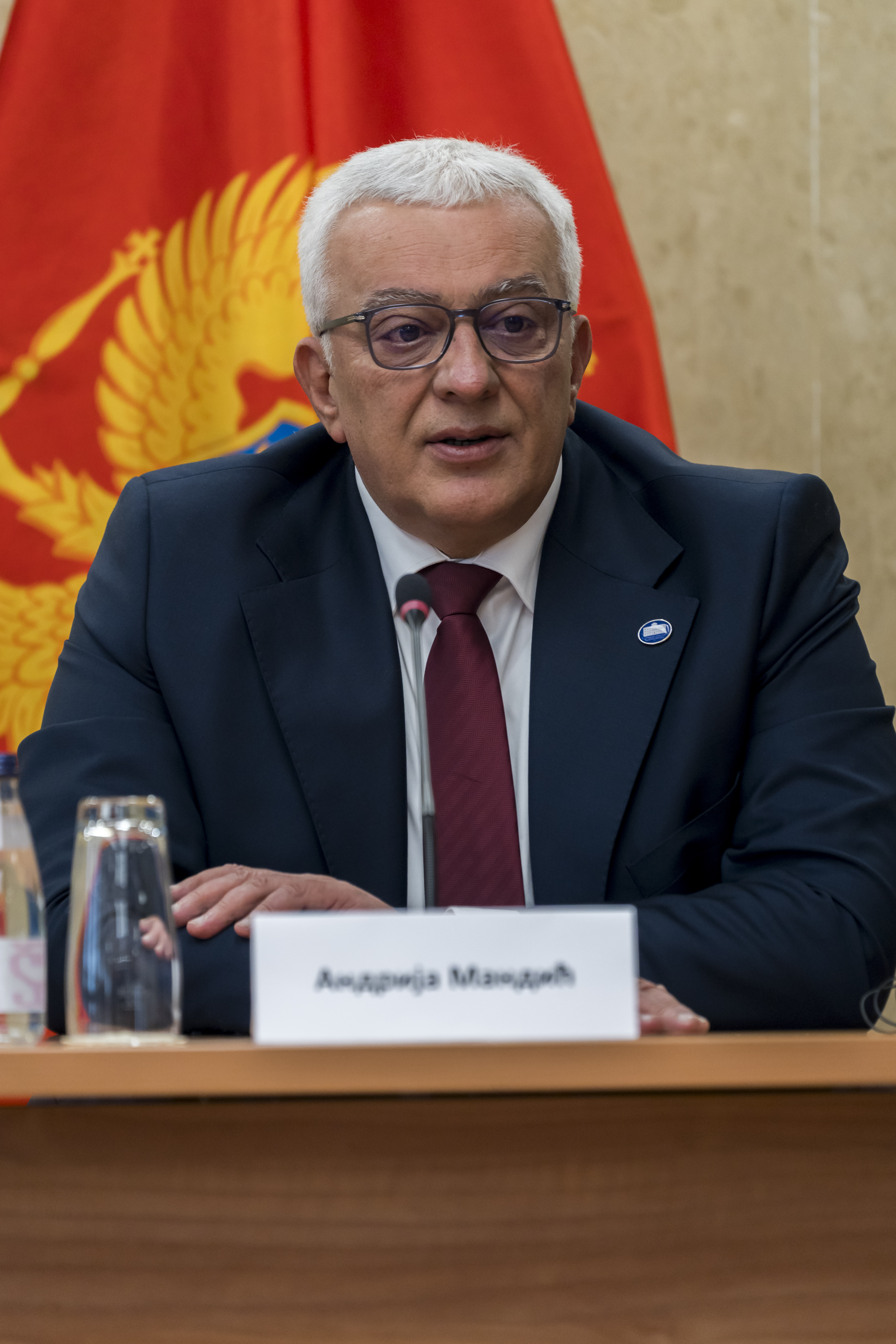
- Mandić in 2026

President of the Parliament of Montenegro
- Incumbent
- Assumed office 30 October 2023
- Preceded by: Danijela Đurović

Member of the Parliament
- Incumbent
- Assumed office 24 April 2022
- In office 22 April 2001 – 30 August 2020

Deputy Minister of Economy of FR Yugoslavia
- In office 1999–2000
- Prime Minister: Momir Bulatović; Zoran Žižić
- Minister: Milan Beko

Personal details
- Born: 19 January 1965 (age 61) Šavnik, SR Montenegro, SFR Yugoslavia
- Party: NSD (from 2009)
- Other political affiliations: SNS (1997–2009); NS (1990–1997)
- Education: University of Montenegro
- Profession: Politician
- Awards

Military service
- Allegiance: FR Yugoslavia
- Branch/service: Yugoslav Army
- Years of service: 1998 – 1999
- Unit: 5th Motorized Brigade
- Battles/wars: Kosovo War

Andrija Mandić (Serbian Cyrillic: Андрија Мандић; born 19 January 1965) is a Montenegrin politician who has served as president of the Parliament of Montenegro since 30 October 2023 and is an eight-term member of the Parliament. He is the president of the right-wing New Serb Democracy (NSD/NOVA). Mandic was the head of the Democratic Front parliamentary club in the parliament until 2020.

== Political career ==
Mandić fought in the Yugoslav Army's 5th Motorized Brigade during the Kosovo War. From 1999 to 2000, he was the deputy minister of economy of FR Yugoslavia.

During the 2006 Montenegrin independence referendum, Mandić called for minorities to be banned from voting. After the referendum ended in favor of independence, he initially refused to accept the event and declared that Albanians should never be allowed to vote.

In 2008, Mandić became the first president of the Serb List transformed into New Serb Democracy (NOVA). In the 2009 parliamentary election, NOVA ran independently and won 9,2% of the votes as well as eight seats. In the next parliamentary election held in 2012, the party ran within the Democratic Front coalition.

During the 2019–2020 clerical protests in Montenegro, Mandić and all other MPs were arrested without their MP immunity being revoked. He has been declared as the presidential candidate of the Democratic Front coalition for the 2023 Montenegrin presidential election. He ranked third with 19.32% of the vote. After the 2023 parliamentary election, Mandić was elected the Speaker of the parliament.

=== Diplomatic activity as President of the Parliament ===
After assuming office as President of the Parliament of Montenegro on 30 October 2023, Andrija Mandić pursued a program of parliamentary diplomacy focused on Montenegro’s European integration, bilateral parliamentary cooperation and regional connectivity. He participated in European and regional parliamentary forums, including European Parliamentary Week in Brussels and meetings with senior EU and European Parliament officials, while also hosting or conducting official exchanges with parliamentary counterparts from the European Parliament, the United Kingdom, France, Italy, Spain, Israel, Türkiye, Azerbaijan, Bosnia and Herzegovina, Morocco, Sweden, Finland, Monaco, Saudi Arabia, Malta and many other partner countries. During his tenure, the Parliament of Montenegro also hosted major multilateral parliamentary events in Budva, including the fifth OSCE Parliamentary Assembly Silk Road Group conference in 2025 and the first Summit of Speakers and Presidents of Parliament of Parliamentary Assembly of the Mediterranean members and partners in 2026. These activities were presented as part of efforts to strengthen Montenegro’s international parliamentary relations and support its EU-accession process.

=== "New Serb Answer" platform ===
During his tenure as President of the Parliament, Mandić promoted a political approach he described as a “New Serb answer for new times”, presenting it as a shift from earlier mainstream confrontational models toward reconciliation, dialogue and institutional cooperation. He framed this approach around the idea that the Serb community in Montenegro should pursue issues it considers central to its national identity through compromise, alliance-building and participation in the country’s political institutions, while maintaining constructive relations with Montenegrins, Bosniaks, Albanians and other communities. Mandić has linked this position to broader calls for equal rights, social stability and Montenegro’s European path.

Conclusion of the trial over alleged coup

On 15 February 2017, Mandić was stripped of his parliamentary immunity in connection with an ongoing criminal prosecution against him. On 8 June, the High Court in Podgorica confirmed the indictment of Mandić, along with thirteen other persons, including two Russian nationals and Milan Knežević, on charges that included "preparing a conspiracy against the constitutional order and the security of Montenegro" and an "attempted terrorist act". In February 2021, the Montenegrin appellate court overturned the first-instance verdict against Mandić and the other defendants and ordered a retrial. In July 2024, the High Court in Podgorica acquitted Mandić along with all other persons charged with organizing and preparing the alleged 2016 coup d'état. The Court of Appeal of Montenegro has rejected the appeal filed by the Special State Prosecutor’s Office in the so-called “coup attempt” case. By doing so, the court confirmed the previous acquittal issued by the High Court in Podgorica in July 2024. This means that all defendants in the case have been officially acquitted.

=== Persona non grata declaration ===
On 25 July 2024, Mandić, along with deputy prime minister Aleksa Bečić and MP Milan Knežević were declared persona non grata by Croatia following the passage of a resolution in the Parliament of Montenegro recognising a genocide in the Jasenovac concentration camp committed by the pro-Axis Independent State of Croatia during World War II.

Statements regarding Ratko Mladić

On 27 August 2026, Mandić expressed his condolences for the death of war criminal Ratko Mladić, sparking controversy both within the country and abroad. Along with Montenegrin President Milatović, Croatia’s Ministry of Foreign Affairs and the Speaker of the Croatian Parliament also condemned the statements as "extremely inappropriate and reprehensible."

== Honours ==
=== Orders ===
Award or decoration	Country / Entity	Date	Place
Order of the Serbian Flag	Serbia	29 June 2021	Belgrade
Order of the White Angel	Serbian Orthodox Church	10 May 2022	Pljevlja
Order of Honor	Srpska	30 May 2023	Banja Luka
