= List of heads of state of Montenegro =

This article lists the heads of state of Montenegro, from the establishment of the Prince-Bishopric of Montenegro to the present day.

The list includes the heads of state of the Prince-Bishopric of Montenegro, a Serbian Orthodox ecclesiastical principality; the independent monarchies of Principality of Montenegro and Kingdom of Montenegro; the People's Republic of Montenegro / Socialist Republic of Montenegro, a constituent republic of the Federal People's Republic of Yugoslavia / Socialist Federal Republic of Yugoslavia; the Republic of Montenegro, a constituent republic of the Federal Republic of Yugoslavia / State Union of Serbia and Montenegro; and Montenegro, an independent state.

== Monarchy ==
=== Prince-Bishopric of Montenegro ===
| Prince-Bishop | | | | Reign | | | Claim |
| No. | Portrait | Name (Birth–Death) | House | Reign start | Reign end | Duration | Claim |
|---|---|---|---|---|---|---|---|
| 1 | | Danilo I Данило I (1670–1735) | Petrović-Njegoš | 19 July 1696 | 11 January 1735 | 38 years, 176 days | Founder of the House of Petrović-Njegoš |
| 2 | | Sava II; Сава II (1702–1782) | Petrović-Njegoš | 11 January 1735 | 7 March 1781 | 46 years, 55 days | Relative of Danilo I Ruled jointly with Vasilije III from 1750 until 10 March 1766 |
| 3 | | Vasilije III; Василије III (1709–1766) | Petrović-Njegoš | 11 August 1750 | 10 March 1766 | 15 years, 211 days | Relative of Danilo I and Sava II; Ruled jointly with Sava II |
| | | Stephen the Little; Шћепан Мали (c. 1739–1773) | Non-dynastic | 17 October 1767 | 22 September 1773 | 5 years, 340 days | Impostor who was purported to be the dead Emperor of Russia Peter III in exile. Proclaimed leader by the people of Montenegro and ruled the country as an absolute monarch, sidelining Sava II |
| 4 | | Arsenije II; Арсеније II (fl. 1766–1784) | Non-dynastic (Plamenac) | 7 March 1781 | 15 May 1784 | 3 years, 69 days | Non-hereditary ruler. Succeed Sava II as the Metropolitan of Cetinje and as the Prince-Bishop of Montenegro |
| 5 | | Petar I Петар I (1747–1830) | Petrović-Njegoš | 13 October 1784 | 30 October 1830 | 46 years, 17 days | Relative of Sava II and Vasilije III |
| 6 | | Petar II; Петар II (1813–1851) | Petrović-Njegoš | 30 October 1830 | 31 October 1851 | 21 years, 1 day | Relative of Petar I |
| 7 | | Danilo II; Данило II (1826–1860) | Petrović-Njegoš | 31 October 1851 | 13 March 1852 | 134 days | Relative of Petar II |

=== Principality of Montenegro ===
| Prince | | | | Reign | | | Claim |
| No. | Portrait | Name (Birth–Death) | House | Reign start | Reign end | Duration | Claim |
|---|---|---|---|---|---|---|---|
| 1 | | Danilo I Данило I (1826–1860) | Petrović-Njegoš | 13 March 1852 | 13 August 1860 (Assassinated) | 8 years, 153 days | Previously ruled as Prince-Bishop |
| 2 | | Nikola I Никола I (1841–1921) | Petrović-Njegoš | 13 August 1860 | 28 August 1910 | 50 years, 15 days | Relative of Danilo I |

=== Kingdom of Montenegro ===
| King | | | | Reign | | | Claim |
| No. | Portrait | Name (Birth–Death) | House | Reign start | Reign end | Duration | Claim |
|---|---|---|---|---|---|---|---|
| 1 | | Nikola I Никола I (1841–1921) (Note: In exile from 15 January 1916, due to the occupation by the Central Powers during World War I. Formally deposed at the Podgorica Assembly, following the liberation in 1918.) | Petrović-Njegoš | 28 August 1910 | 26 November 1918 | 8 years, 90 days | Previously ruled as Prince |
From 1918 until 1941 Montenegro (later Zeta) was an oblast and later banovina within Kingdom of Yugoslavia.

== Republic ==
=== People's Republic of Montenegro / Socialist Republic of Montenegro (constituent republic of Yugoslavia) ===
Note: between 1943 and 1974, Montenegro's head of state was the speaker (president) of the Montenegrin parliament.

Political parties: Unitary National Liberation Front / People's Front Communist Party / League of Communists Democratic Party of Socialists

Status: Denotes Acting President

| President | | | Term of office | | | Party | Notes |
| No. | Portrait | Name (Birth–Death) | Took office | Left office | Time in office | Party | Notes |
|---|---|---|---|---|---|---|---|
President of the Montenegrin Anti-Fascist Assembly of National Liberation; 1943–1946
| — | | Niko Miljanić; Никола Миљанић (1892–1957) | 15 November 1943 | 21 November 1946 | 3 years, 6 days | Independent (JNOF / NFJ) | Leader of Montenegrin wartime assembly. |
Presidents of the Presidency of the People's Assembly; 1946–1953
| 1 | | Miloš Rašović; Милош Рашовић (1903–1968) | 21 November 1946 | 6 November 1950 | 3 years, 350 days | Communist Party | |
| 2 | | Nikola Kovačević; Никола Ковачевић (1890–1964) | 6 November 1950 | 4 February 1953 | 2 years, 90 days | Communist Party (renamed) | Communist Party reformed and renamed into the League of Communists. |
| 2 | | Nikola Kovačević; Никола Ковачевић (1890–1964) | 6 November 1950 | 4 February 1953 | 2 years, 90 days | League of Communists (renamed) | Communist Party reformed and renamed into the League of Communists. |
Presidents of the People's Assembly; 1953–1974
| (2) | | Nikola Kovačević; Никола Ковачевић (1890–1964) | 4 February 1953 | 15 December 1953 | 314 days | League of Communists | |
| 3 | | Blažo Jovanović; Блажо Јовановић (1907–1976) | 15 December 1953 | 12 July 1962 | 8 years, 209 days | League of Communists | |
| 4 | | Filip Bajković; Филип Бајковић (1910–1985) | 12 July 1962 | 5 May 1963 | 297 days | League of Communists | |
| 5 | | Andrija Mugoša; Андрија Мугоша (1912–2006) | 5 May 1963 | 5 May 1967 | 4 years | League of Communists | |
| 6 | | Veljko Milatović; Вељко Милатовић (1921–2004) | 5 May 1967 | 6 October 1969 | 2 years, 154 days | League of Communists | |
| 7 | | Vidoje Žarković; Видоје Жарковић (1927–2000) | 6 October 1969 | 1 April 1974 | 4 years, 177 days | League of Communists | |
| — | | Budislav Šoškić; Будислав Шошкић (1925–1979) | 1 April 1974 | 5 April 1974 | 4 days | League of Communists | Acting President |
Presidents of the Presidency; 1974–1990
| (6) | | Veljko Milatović; Вељко Милатовић (1921–2004) | 5 April 1974 | 7 May 1982 | 8 years, 32 days | League of Communists | |
| 8 | | Veselin Đuranović; Веселин Ђурановић (1925–1997) | 7 May 1982 | 7 May 1983 | 1 year | League of Communists | |
| 9 | | Marko Orlandić; Марко Орландић (1930–2019) | 7 May 1983 | 7 May 1984 | 1 year | League of Communists | |
| 10 | | Miodrag Vlahović; Миодраг Влаховић (1924–2006) | 7 May 1984 | 7 May 1985 | 1 year | League of Communists | |
| 11 | | Branislav Šoškić; Бранислав Шошкић (1922–2022) | 7 May 1985 | 7 May 1986 | 1 year | League of Communists | |
| 12 | | Radivoje Brajović; Радивоје Брајовић (born 1935) | 7 May 1986 | 7 May 1988 | 2 years | League of Communists | |
| 13 | | Božina Ivanović; Божина Ивановић (1931–2002) | 7 May 1988 | 13 January 1989 (Note: Removed from the position during the Anti-bureaucratic revolution.) | 251 days | League of Communists | |
| — | | Slobodan Simović; Слободан Симовић (1939–1998) | 13 January 1989 | 17 March 1989 | 63 days | League of Communists | Acting President |
| 14 | | Branko Kostić; Бранко Костић (1939–2020) | 17 March 1989 | 23 December 1990 | 1 year, 281 days | League of Communists | |
President of the Republic; 1990–1992
| 15 | | Momir Bulatović; Момир Булатовић (1956–2019) | 23 December 1990 | 28 April 1992 | 1 year, 127 days | League of Communists (until 1991) | League of Communists reformed and renamed into the Democratic Party of Socialists. |
| | | Momir Bulatović; Момир Булатовић (1956–2019) | 23 December 1990 | 28 April 1992 | 1 year, 127 days | Democratic Party of Socialists (from 1991) | League of Communists reformed and renamed into the Democratic Party of Socialists. |

=== Republic of Montenegro (constituent republic of FR Yugoslavia / State Union of Serbia and Montenegro) ===
Political parties: Democratic Party of Socialists of Montenegro Democratic Party of Socialists – Momir Bulatović Social Democratic Party of Montenegro

Status: Denotes Acting President

| President | | | Election | Term of office | | | Party | Notes |
| No. | Portrait | Name (Birth–Death) | Election | Took office | Left office | Time in office | Party | Notes |
|---|---|---|---|---|---|---|---|---|
| 1 (15) | | Momir Bulatović; Момир Булатовић (1956–2019) | 1990; 1992 | 28 April 1992 | 15 January 1998 | 5 years, 262 days | Democratic Party of Socialists (until 1997) | |
| | | Momir Bulatović; Момир Булатовић (1956–2019) | 1990; 1992 | 28 April 1992 | 15 January 1998 | 5 years, 262 days | DPS – Momir; Bulatović (from 1997) | |
| 2 (16) | | Milo Đukanović; Мило Ђукановић (born 1962) | 1997 | 15 January 1998 | 25 November 2002 | 4 years, 314 days | Democratic Party of Socialists | |
| — | | Filip Vujanović; Филип Вујановић (born 1954) | — | 25 November 2002 | 19 May 2003 | 175 days | Democratic Party of Socialists | Acting |
| — | | Dragan Kujović; Драган Кујовић (1948–2010) | — | 19 May 2003 | 22 May 2003 | 3 days | Democratic Party of Socialists | Acting |
| — | | Rifat Rastoder; Рифат Растодер (1950–2023) | — | 19 May 2003 | 22 May 2003 | 3 days | Social Democratic Party | Acting |
| 3 (17) | | Filip Vujanović; Филип Вујановић (born 1954) | 2003 | 22 May 2003 | 3 June 2006 | 3 years, 12 days | Democratic Party of Socialists | |

=== Montenegro ===
Political parties: Democratic Party of Socialists Europe Now! Independent

| President | | | Election | Term of office | | | Party |
| No. | Portrait | Name (Birth–Death) | Election | Took office | Left office | Time in office | Party |
|---|---|---|---|---|---|---|---|
| (3) (17) | | Filip Vujanović; Филип Вујановић (born 1954) | 2008; 2013 | 3 June 2006 | 20 May 2018 | 11 years, 351 days | Democratic Party of Socialists |
| 4 (16) | | Milo Đukanović; Мило Ђукановић (born 1962) | 2018 | 20 May 2018 | 20 May 2023 | 5 years | Democratic Party of Socialists |
| 5 (17) | | Jakov Milatović; Јаков Милатовић (born 1986) | 2023 | 20 May 2023 | Incumbent | 3 years, 183 days | Europe Now! (until 2024) |
| | | Jakov Milatović; Јаков Милатовић (born 1986) | 2023 | 20 May 2023 | Incumbent | 3 years, 183 days | Independent (from 2024) |

== See also ==
- List of monarchs of Montenegro
- President of Montenegro
  - List of presidents of Montenegro
- Prime Minister of Montenegro
- List of heads of state of Yugoslavia
- President of Serbia and Montenegro
