= List of presidents of Montenegro =

This is a list of the presidents of Montenegro, including the heads of state of the Socialist Republic of Montenegro, a constituent country of the Socialist Federal Republic of Yugoslavia and heads of state of the Republic of Montenegro (1992–2006), a constituent country of the Federal Republic of Yugoslavia / State Union of Serbia and Montenegro. Prior to 1974, Montenegro's head of state was the speaker (president) of the Montenegrin parliament.

The President (Predsjednik) is directly elected to a five-year term and is limited by the Constitution to a maximum of two terms. In addition to being the Commander-in-chief of the Armed Forces, the President has the procedural duty of appointing the Prime Minister with the consent of the Parliament, and has some influence on foreign policy. The President's office is located in the Blue Palace, in the former royal capital Cetinje.

== Montenegro (constituent republic of SFR Yugoslavia) ==
Parties: Independent Communist Party / League of Communists Democratic Party of Socialists

Status: Denotes Acting President

=== People's Republic of Montenegro ===
No.	Portrait	Name (Birth–Death)	Term of office			Political party
No.	Portrait	Name (Birth–Death)	Took office	Left office	Time in office	Political party
President of the Montenegrin Anti-Fascist Assembly of National Liberation; 1943–1946
–		Niko Miljanić; Никола Миљанић (1892–1957) (Note: Leader of Montenegrin wartime assembly.)	15 November 1943	21 November 1946	3 years, 6 days	Independent (JNOF / NFJ)
Presidents of the Presidency of the People's Assembly; 1946–1953
1		Miloš Rašović; Милош Рашовић (1903–1968)	21 November 1946	6 November 1950	3 years, 350 days	Communist Party
2		Nikola Kovačević; Никола Ковачевић (1890–1964)	6 November 1950	4 February 1953	2 years, 90 days	Communist Party (Note: In 1952 the Communist Party of Yugoslavia (KPJ) reformed and renamed into the League of Communists of Yugoslavia (SKJ).)
2		Nikola Kovačević; Никола Ковачевић (1890–1964)	6 November 1950	4 February 1953	2 years, 90 days	League of Communists
Presidents of the People's Assembly; 1953–1974
2		Nikola Kovačević; Никола Ковачевић (1890–1964)	4 February 1953	15 December 1953	314 days	League of Communists
3		Blažo Jovanović; Блажо Јовановић (1907–1976)	15 December 1953	12 July 1962	8 years, 209 days	League of Communists
4		Filip Bajković; Филип Бајковић (1910–1985)	12 July 1962	5 May 1963	297 days	League of Communists
5		Andrija Mugoša; Андрија Мугоша (1912–2006)	5 May 1963	7 July 1963	63 days	League of Communists

=== Socialist Republic of Montenegro ===
No.	Portrait	Name (Birth–Death)	Term of office			Political party
No.	Portrait	Name (Birth–Death)	Took office	Left office	Time in office	Political party
(5)		Andrija Mugoša; Андрија Мугоша (1912–2006)	7 July 1963	5 May 1967	3 years, 302 days	League of Communists
6		Veljko Milatović; Вељко Милатовић (1921–2004)	5 May 1967	6 October 1969	2 years, 154 days	League of Communists
7		Vidoje Žarković; Видоје Жарковић (1927–2000)	6 October 1969	1 April 1974	4 years, 177 days	League of Communists
–		Budislav Šoškić; Будислав Шошкић (1925–1979)	1 April 1974	5 April 1974	4 days	League of Communists
Presidents of the Presidency; 1974–1990
8		Veljko Milatović; Вељко Милатовић (1921–2004)	5 April 1974	7 May 1982	8 years, 32 days	League of Communists
9		Veselin Đuranović; Веселин Ђурановић (1925–1997)	7 May 1982	7 May 1983	1 year	League of Communists
10		Marko Orlandić; Марко Орландић (1930–2019)	7 May 1983	7 May 1984	1 year	League of Communists
11		Miodrag Vlahović; Миодраг Влаховић (1924–2006)	7 May 1984	7 May 1985	1 year	League of Communists
12		Branislav Šoškić; Бранислав Шошкић (1922–2022)	7 May 1985	7 May 1986	1 year	League of Communists
13		Radivoje Brajović; Радивоје Брајовић (born 1935)	7 May 1986	7 May 1988	2 year	League of Communists
14		Božina Ivanović; Божина Ивановић (1931–2002)	7 May 1988	13 January 1989	251 days	League of Communists
–		Slobodan Simović; Слободан Симовић (1939–1998)	13 January 1989	17 March 1989	63 days	League of Communists
15		Branko Kostić; Бранко Костић (1939–2020)	17 March 1989	23 December 1990	1 year, 281 days	League of Communists
President of Republic; 1990–1992
1		Momir Bulatović; Момир Булатовић (1956–2019)	23 December 1990	28 April 1992	1 year, 127 days	League of Communists (Note: In June 1991 the League of Communists of Montenegro reformed and renamed into the Democratic Party of Socialists (DPS).)
		Momir Bulatović; Момир Булатовић (1956–2019)	23 December 1990	28 April 1992	1 year, 127 days	Democratic Party of Socialists

== Republic of Montenegro (constituent republic of FR Yugoslavia / Serbia and Montenegro) ==
Parties: Democratic Party of Socialists – Momir Bulatović Democratic Party of Socialists Social Democratic Party

Status: Denotes Acting President

No.	Portrait	Name (Birth–Death)	Term of office			Political party	Elected
No.	Portrait	Name (Birth–Death)	Took office	Left office	Time in office	Political party	Elected
(1)		Momir Bulatović; Момир Булатовић (1956–2019)	28 April 1992	15 January 1998	5 years, 262 days	Democratic Party of Socialists (Note: In July 1997 Bulatović left the Democratic Party of Socialists and founded a new party DPS — Momir Bulatović (which later was renamed into the SNP).)	1990; 1992
		Momir Bulatović; Момир Булатовић (1956–2019)	28 April 1992	15 January 1998	5 years, 262 days	Socialist People's Party	1990; 1992
2		Milo Đukanović; Мило Ђукановић (born 1962)	15 January 1998	25 November 2002	4 years, 314 days	Democratic Party of Socialists	1997
–		Filip Vujanović; Филип Вујановић (born 1954)	25 November 2002	19 May 2003	175 days	Democratic Party of Socialists	—
–		Dragan Kujović; Драган Кујовић (1948–2010)	19 May 2003	22 May 2003	3 days	Democratic Party of Socialists	—
–		Rifat Rastoder; Рифат Растодер (1950–2023)	19 May 2003	22 May 2003	3 days	Social Democratic Party	—
3		Filip Vujanović; Филип Вујановић (born 1954)	22 May 2003	3 June 2006	3 years, 12 days	Democratic Party of Socialists	2003

== Montenegro ==
Parties: Democratic Party of Socialists Europe Now! Independent

No.	Portrait	Name (Birth–Death)	Term of office			Political party	Elected
No.	Portrait	Name (Birth–Death)	Took office	Left office	Time in office	Political party	Elected
1 (3)		Filip Vujanović; Филип Вујановић (born 1954)	3 June 2006	20 May 2018	11 years, 351 days	Democratic Party of Socialists	2008; 2013
2 (4)		Milo Đukanović; Мило Ђукановић (born 1962)	20 May 2018	20 May 2023	5 years	Democratic Party of Socialists	2018
3 (5)		Jakov Milatović; Јаков Милатовић (born 1986)	20 May 2023	Incumbent	3 years, 183 days	Europe Now! (Note: In February 2024 Milatović left the Europe Now! (PES).)	2023
		Jakov Milatović; Јаков Милатовић (born 1986)	20 May 2023	Incumbent	3 years, 183 days	Independent	2023

== See also ==
- List of rulers of Montenegro
- List of heads of state of Montenegro, for a comprehensive list of Montenegrin heads of state since 1696
- President of Montenegro
- President of the Parliament of Montenegro
- Prime Minister of Montenegro
- President of Serbia and Montenegro
- List of heads of state of Yugoslavia
