= Election boycott =

Mass abstention by a group of voters during an election

An election boycott is the boycotting of an election by a group of voters, each of whom abstains from voting. Boycotting may be used as a form of political protest where voters feel that electoral fraud is likely, or that the electoral system is biased against its candidates, that the polity organizing the election lacks legitimacy, or that the candidates running are very unpopular. In jurisdictions with compulsory voting, a boycott may amount to an act of civil disobedience; alternatively, supporters of the boycott may be able to cast blank votes or vote for "none of the above". Boycotting voters may belong to a particular regional or ethnic group. A particular political party or candidate may refuse to run in the election and urges its supporters to boycott the vote.

In the case of a referendum, a boycott may be used as a voting tactic by opponents of the proposition. If the referendum requires a minimum turnout to be valid, the boycott may prevent this quorum being reached. In general elections, individuals and parties will often boycott in order to protest the ruling party's policies with the hope that when voters do not show up the elections will be deemed illegitimate by outside observers.

== Major instances of electoral boycotts ==
Election	Turnout (%)	Notes
1923 San Marino general election	35.5	
1947 North-West Frontier Province referendum	51	
1971 Trinidad and Tobago general election	33.2	
1973 Northern Ireland sovereignty referendum	58.1	Less than 1% amongst Catholics
1978 Guyanese constitutional referendum	70.8	Opposition estimates were between 10% and 14%
1978 South West African legislative election	80.2	
1983 Jamaican general election	2.7	6 of 60 seats contested, with 55% turnout in them.
1984 South African general election	29.9 and 20.8	
1989 South African general election	18.1 and 23.3	
1991 Burkinabé presidential election	27.3	
1992 Ghanaian parliamentary election	28.1	
1993 Togolese presidential election	36.2	
February 1996 Bangladeshi general election	21.0	
1997 Malian presidential election	29.0	
1997 Yemeni parliamentary election	61.0	Turnout (1993): 84.8%
1997 Slovak referendum	9.5	
1997 Serbian general election	57.4	The elections were boycotted by several parties, including the Democratic Party, the Democratic Party of Serbia and the Civic Alliance, which claimed that the elections would not be held under fair conditions
1999 Algerian presidential election	60	Boycotting candidates claimed that it was only around 25%
2000 Ivorian presidential election	37.4	
2000 Yugoslavian general election	28.8 (Note: in Montenegro)	Boycotting by the ruling coalition of Montenegro, led by DPS
2002 Gambian parliamentary election	56.4	Voting only took place in 15 of the 48 seats
2002 Montenegrin presidential election	45.9	Election invalid due to turnout being lower than 50%
2003 Azerbaijani presidential election	62.85	
February 2003 Montenegrin presidential election	46.6	Election invalid due to turnout being lower than 50%
May 2003 Montenegrin presidential election	48.4	
2003 Guinean presidential election	86	Opposition estimates were less than 15%
2005 Venezuelan parliamentary election	25.3	
2006 Thai general election	65.2	Boycotted by all 3 opposition parties in the House of Representatives.
2008 Djiboutian parliamentary election	72.6	
2012 Gambian parliamentary election	38.7	
2014 Thai general election	65.2	Boycotting by Democrat Party.
2014 Bangladeshi general election	22.0	
2016 Hungarian migrant quota referendum	44.0	Referendum boycotted by MSZP, DK, Együtt, Párbeszéd, Modern Hungary Movement and The Homeland Not For Sale Movement Party, resulting in 98% of voters supporting the government. 224 thousand voters submitted invalid ballots, influenced by a campaign by the Hungarian Two-tailed Dog Party.
2017 Puerto Rican status referendum	23	Statehood, polled at 52% just 2 weeks prior, chosen by 97% of voters
2017 Venezuelan Constituent Assembly election	41.5	Opposition estimates were around 20%
2017 Catalan independence referendum	43.03	Opposition parties called on their voters to boycott the vote, except Catalunya Sí que es Pot who supported participation.
October 2017 Kenyan presidential election	39.03	After the Supreme Court nullified the original election and ordered a new one to be held within 60 days, opposition candidate Raila Odinga withdrew from the rerun, claiming the electoral commission had failed to institute reforms.
2018 Egyptian presidential election	41.1	
2018 Russian presidential election	67.5	Russian opposition leader Alexei Navalny called for an election boycott, however an about 67.5% voter turnout was estimated.
2018 Venezuelan presidential election	46.1	Opposition estimates were between 17% and 26%
2018 Macedonian referendum	36.9	
2019 Albanian local elections	23.0	Opposition estimates were 15.1%
2019 Algerian presidential election	39.9	
2020 Artsakhian general election	45.0	
2020 Serbian parliamentary election	48.9	
2020 Ivorian presidential election	53.9	
2020 Venezuelan parliamentary election	30.5	
2020 Iranian legislative election	42	Conservatives:76.20%, Reformists: 6.89%
2021 Djiboutian presidential election	76.44	
2021 Hong Kong legislative election	30.2	Pro-democrats boycotted the election as many in the camp believed the space for them to participate in the overhauled political landscape under the Hong Kong national security law had been extinguished.
2022 Tunisian constitutional referendum	30.5	Many major parties boycotted the election after the 2021–2022 Tunisian political crisis.
2022–23 Tunisian parliamentary election	11.2 and 11.4	Almost every major party boycotted the election
2023 Kosovan local elections	3.5	Of the approximately 40,000 Serbs of North Kosovo, only 13 Serbs voted in the elections. All Serbian parties boycotted the elections. See 2022–2023 North Kosovo crisis.
2023 Polish referendum	40.91	With record 74% turnover in 2023 Polish parliamentary election which happened on the same day majority of opposition voters did not take the ballot for the referendum making it void.

== Examples ==
From 1868 into the 20th century, the Popes declared that non expedit ("it is not expedient") that the Italian Catholics participate in the Italian parliamentary elections as either candidates or electors.

In South Africa, the three largest independent social movements boycott the vote under the banner of the No Land! No House! No Vote! Campaign.

Other social movements in other parts of the world also have similar campaigns or non-voting preferences. These include the Naxalites in India, the Zapatista Army of National Liberation in Mexico and various Anarchist oriented movements. In Mexico's mid term 2009 elections there was strong support for 'Nulo'—a campaign to vote for no one. In India poor people's movements in Singur, Nandigram and Lalgarh have rejected parliamentary politics (as well as the NGO and Maoist alternatives).

== Outcome ==
Analyzing the hybrid regimes in the period 1981–2006, the political scientist Ian O. Smith concluded that an election boycott by the opposition could increase the chances that the ruling party will lose future elections. Gregory Weeks noted that some authoritarian regimes in Latin America were prolonged due to the boycott of the opposition. Gail Buttorff and Douglas Dion explain that boycotts by the opposition under authoritarianism have led to different outcomes, sometimes predicting regime change and sometimes to make stronger the current government.

== See also ==
- Abstention, an individual not voting
- Abstentionism, running in an election to a deliberative assembly but refusing to take any seats won
