= A Better Montenegro =

A Better Montenegro Боља Црна Гора Bolja Crna Gora
- Leader: Srđan Milić
- Founded: 2009
- Dissolved: 2010
- Ideology: Big tent populism Pro-Europeanism
- Political position: Centre-right (majority)
- Parliament (2009): 29 / 81

A Better Montenegro (Serbian: Боља Црна Гора, Bolja Crna Gora) is a broad opposition coalition in Montenegro made up virtually the entire opposition. It is led by the three only parliamentary opposition parties, Socialist People's Party of Montenegro, New Serb Democracy and the Movement for Changes and the political alliance is led by the three leaders of those parties Srđan Milić, Andrija Mandić and Nebojša Medojević.

== History ==
It was formed in 2009 before the forthcoming local elections after negotiations in the opposition which included continuing the boycott of al local elections as in 2009 or forming one common list of almost the entire Montenegrin opposition.

It was the biggest gathering of the Montenegrin opposition since introduction of parliamentarism in 1990 in Montenegro. Milić had negotiated with Montenegrin President Filip Vujanović on the participation of the opposition, which boycotts elections considering them illegal and unjust because of the flaws in the electoral law which should have been reformed when new Constitution was brought up in 2007 and they made a deal to organize general local elections in the remaining 14 municipalities all round which still haven't had elections since independence. The coalition won more than 50% of votes only in Pljevlja municipality.

== Composing parties ==
Party	Abbr.	Ideology	Position		
Socialist People's Party; Socijalistička narodna partija Социјалистичка народна партија	SNP	Social conservatism Social democracy Pro-Europeanism	Syncretic	Srđan Milić	16 / 81
New Serb Democracy; Nova srpska demokratija Нова српска демократија	NSD	National conservatism Moderate-right politics Serb minority interests	Centre-right	Andrija Mandić	8 / 81
Movement for Changes; Pokret za promjene Покрет за промјене	PzP	Liberal conservatism Economic liberalism Pro-Europeanism	Centre-right	Nebojša Medojević	5 / 81
People's Party; Narodna stranka Народна странка	NS	Unionism; Christian democracy Cultural conservatism	Centre-right to right-wing	Predrag Popović	0 / 75
Democratic Serb Party; Demokratska srpska stranka Демократска српска странка	DSS	Right-wing	Unionism; National conservatism Christian democracy	Ranko Kadić	0 / 75
Yugoslav Communist Party^{[b]} Jugoslovenska komunistička partija Југословенска комунистичка партија	JKP	Communism; Titoism; Yugoslavism	Left-wing to far-left	Zoran Radošević	0 / 75
Party of Serb Radicals; Stranka Srpskh Radikala; Странка Српских Радикала	SSR	Serbian ultranationalism Right-wing populism Social conservatism Serbian-Montenegrin unionism Russophilia; Hard Euroscepticism	Far-right	Duško Sekulić	0 / 75
