= Greens of Montenegro =

The Greens of Montenegro (Montenegrin: Zeleni Crne Gore, Зелени Црне Горе (Montenegrin Cyrillic)) was a short-lived green politics party in Montenegro. It was officially registered in the government as a non-governmental organisation (NGO). It was founded at the Institutional conference held on 2 February 2002 and was registered as a NGO on 21 March 2002. NGO founder and most prominent member was Montenegrin physicist Dragan Hajduković, who was a candidate for the President of Montenegro in December 2002 and February 2003, both elections were declared invalid due to low turnout, and finally in May 2003, when he won the third place with 4.4% of votes.

== See also ==
- Green party
- Green politics
