= Kujović =

Kujović is a surname. Notable people with the surname include:

- Dragan Kujović (1948–2010), Montenegrin politician
- Emir Kujović (born 1988), Swedish footballer
- Vladan Kujović (born 1978), Serbian footballer
