= Rifat Rastoder =

Montenegrin politician (1950–2023)

- Рифат Растодер
- Rastoder in 2016

Acting President of Montenegro
- In office 19 May – 22 May 2003 Serving with Dragan Kujović
- Prime Minister: Milo Đukanović
- Preceded by: Milo Đukanović; Filip Vujanović (acting)
- Succeeded by: Filip Vujanović

Member of the Parliamentary Assembly of the Council of Europe
- In office 25 January 2016 – 22 January 2017
- Parliamentary group: Socialist Group

Personal details
- Born: 11 July 1950 Radmanci or Bihor, Berane, PR Montenegro, FPR Yugoslavia
- Died: 4 May 2023 (aged 72) Podgorica, Montenegro
- Party: SDP (1993–2016)
- Children: 2
- Relatives: Šerbo Rastoder
- Occupation: Journalist; politician; writer

Rifat Rastoder (Bosnian and Montenegrin Cyrillic: Рифат Растодер; 11 July 1950 – 4 May 2023) was a Montenegrin politician, writer and journalist of Bosniak ethnicity. He was the deputy speaker of the Parliament of Montenegro and the vice-president of the Social Democratic Party of Montenegro.

== Career ==
In 1969, Rastoder moved to Titograd (now Podgorica) where he continued to live until his death. He became a professional journalist in 1980. Until 1986, he worked for Radio Crne Gore as a journalist, program editor and the editor of the programming block. In 1990, he was voted Best Journalist. By late 1996, he had become a journalist and editor of the interior-political rubric and commentator for the Pobjeda newspaper. From 1991, he was a journalist and editor in the weekly news magazine Monitor, along with one of the initiators of founding Radio Antena M.

He became active in Montenegrin politics in 1990, founding the Forum for Bosniaks in Montenegro. He was also a member of the board of the Civic Forum and was one of the founders of the Social Democratic Party of Montenegro, of which he was vice-president.

Rastoder was chosen as representative in the Parliament four times, and deputy speaker of the Parliament for three mandates of which he served under Svetozar Marović, Filip Vujanović and Ranko Krivokapić. He served as acting President of Montenegro from 19 to 22 May 2003.

Rastoder retired from politics in 2016, formally leaving his position as a member of the Parliamentary Assembly of the Council of Europe in 2017.

== Personal life ==
Rastoder was married with two children. His cousin, Šerbo Rastoder, is a prominent historian. He was a Muslim and spoke in favour of freedom of religion in Montenegro. Besides his native language, he also spoke Russian and to a lesser degree, English.

He was an athlete, coach and referee of karate in Montenegro.

Rastoder died on 4 May 2023, at the age of 72.

== Works ==
- Crvena mrlja (1990; co-author)
- Usud imena
- Pravo na ime

Political offices
Preceded by Filip Vujanović	President of Montenegro; Acting; 2003	Succeeded by Filip Vujanović
