= Nebojša Medojević =

Montenegrin politician

Nebojša Medojević Небојша Медојевић
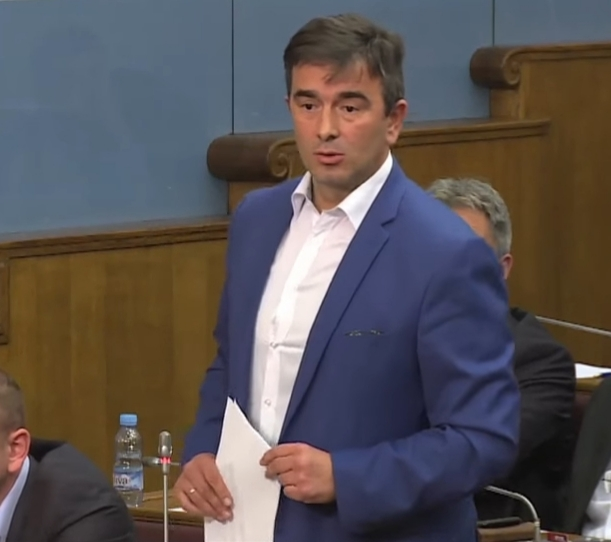
- Nebojša Medojević in May 2016

Member of Parliament
- Incumbent
- Assumed office 10 December 2006
- President: Ranko Krivokapić; Darko Pajović; Ivan Brajović; Aleksa Bečić

Personal details
- Born: 13 June 1966 (age 60) Pljevlja, SFR Yugoslavia (now Montenegro)
- Party: GzP / PzP (Since 2002); SDP (Until 1999)
- Education: University of Montenegro
- Profession: Politician
- Nickname: "Medo"

Nebojša Medojević (Montenegrin Cyrillic: Небојша Медојевић; born June 13, 1966) is a Montenegrin politician. He is the president of the Movement for Changes (PzP), a political party emerging from the Montenegrin NGO Group for Changes. He ran for president in the 2008 presidential election of Montenegro.

== Political career ==
=== Entering politics and anti-war activism (1990s) ===
Medojević began his political career in 1989, when he and other students founded the "Student Forum Peace Movement", which argued against Montenegrin reservists in the Yugoslav People's Army mobilizing for the Croatian front in the breakup of Yugoslavia. Due to his anti-war positions during the breakup of Yugoslavia, Medojević was labeled as a "traitor" and a "foreign agent" by the local media. In 1992, he spoke at a protest in defense of Muslims living in Pljevlja, whose homes and shops had been vandalized after the Bosnian War started. Medojević's first political party after the breakup of SFR Yugoslavia was the Social Democratic Party, which he joined in the early 1990s.

In addition to his activism and career with the SDP, Medojević became the manager of Podgorica's Agency for Economic Reconstruction and Foreign Investments in 1991.

In 1999, his career changed in a series of rapid events: he was fired from the Agency on April 9, 1999, after he accused other members of the Agency for prioritizing their privileges over the fairness of privatizations. A few months later, he resigned from the SDP December 18, 1999.

In March 2000, he was a guest at a party assembly meeting of the Liberal Alliance (LSCG), which at the time tried courting Medojević into their party. However, Medojević ended up not joining, instead becoming one of the founding members of G17 Plus.

=== Transitional years (2000–2006) ===
Medojević was a member of G17 Plus for only a brief period of time, as he subsequently joined fellow Montenegrin economists and academics to form the Movement for Changes in September 2002, which was modeled after G17 Plus. Although Medojević supported Montenegro's independence from the state union of Serbia and Montenegro, he told The Economist in 2004 that independence should be delayed for economic reforms. In spite of his personal pro-independence stance, Medojević made the decision to not join the pro-independence coalition before the 2006 Montenegrin independence referendum. In February 2006, he participated in a meeting with the leading unionists, Predrag Bulatović and Miodrag Lekić, and former Minister of Police Andrija Jovićević, in what he said was a discussion to "change the regime of Milo Đukanović after the referendum, regardless of the referendum results". Medojević told journalist Nedim Sejdinović, "I have no reservations, I will go out to the referendum and vote for an independent Montenegro." However, he elaborated his reasoning on abstaining from the pro-independence campaign:

"I must say that on May 21 I will vote only out of principle. Mr. Đukanović in the last seven to eight years, at least in my eyes, has dirtied and compromised the project of independence so much that it's already a question whether this is that same idea with which we started in the late '80s and early '90s. On one hand we have the responsibility to the act of reviving Montenegrin statehood, but on the other - there's the fact that this state is led by the worst part of sovereign Montenegro - Đukanović and his clan."

A month before the independence referendum, Medojević was a member of a four-member delegation of opposition politicians which visited Washington D.C., allegedly invited by Condoleezza Rice in the name of the State Department. The director of the Trade Mission of Montenegro in Washington, Zorica Marić-Đorđević, denied the allegation, suggesting that the delegation came uninvited. The consulate of the United States in Podgorica also denied that the four politicians were invited. Medojević's party, Movement for Changes, released a statement saying that Medojević and the other three delegates were invited to DC to discuss the referendum in Montenegro as well as post-referendum scenarios.

=== Post-referendum era (2007–present) ===
Medojević was the Movement for Changes' candidate in the 2008 presidential election. During his campaign, he was endorsed by two Albanian minority parties, Albanian Alternative and FORCA. He came in third with slightly over 16% of the national vote.

In the summer of 2012, a broad coalition of opposition parties called the Democratic Front formed in Montenegro, which Medojević and his party joined. Later that year, Medojević proposed to remove the last lines of the national anthem of Montenegro, Oj, svijetla majska zoro. He stated that the anthem's author, Sekula Drljević, was a war criminal and a fascist. He saw the anthem in its complete form as a provocation to Serbs in Montenegro, who suffered under Drljević's collaboration with the Axis powers during World War II. The following year, Medojević did not run for president in the 2013 presidential election, since Miodrag Lekić's candidacy represented the Democratic Front at the time.

Amidst the 2014 floods in Southeast Europe, Medojević became the target of media backlash after he wrote a controversial status on Twitter, saying jokingly, "Be careful for what you wish for, your wishes might become true - Belgrade on the water". The tweet was in reference to the Belgrade Waterfront project. A Serbian tabloid, Kurir, reacted with a negative article regarding Medojević's tweet. Medojević then said that he tweeted the status on May 14, before he realized there was serious flooding in Serbia. He acknowledged that the floods in Serbia were a catastrophe, and apologized on Twitter to people who "felt insulted because of the targeting and lies of the media", which he asserted took his tweet out of context.

In October 2015 Medojević participated in the anti-government protests in Montenegro. He suffered injuries in a confrontation with the riot police during the protests. Medojević rejected an invitation by Democratic Front leader Andrija Mandić, to attend a protest against Montenegro's accession to NATO in December 2015. Medojević stated that he and his party are not against Montenegro's accession to NATO, but that he wants a referendum on whether Montenegro should join NATO.

Following the 2016 parliamentary election in Montenegro, the opposition did not immediately recognize the results of the election, and for a brief period there was still a possibility of the election being re-held. During that period, Medojević made a public offer to Rafet Husović of the Bosniak Party, such that if Husović and his party joined the Democratic Front, he would push for Husović to be selected as Prime Minister of Montenegro. Otherwise, the Bosniak Party had previously participated in coalitions with the ruling DPS. Husović's Bosniak Party voted on whether to join the Democratic Front or to remain in a coalition with DPS, and the party ended up voting to stay as a partner to DPS, ultimately rejecting Medojević's bid.

During the 2016 US presidential election cycle, Medojević endorsed Donald Trump. In a discussion with Vijesti, Medojević criticized Hillary Clinton, stating that "she represents the old foreign policy of interventions, wars, formation of terrorist organizations and regime change, which has brought the world to global catastrophe and to an explosion of terrorism." He also stated that Trump's victory would lead to new balances of power in the world.

Medojević also publicly endorsed political actions of Italian far-right politician Matteo Salvini during the migrant crisis, even naming the immigrants "terrorist army, financed by global banking fascists" on his official Twitter account, publishing a series of photos of allegedly militant mid-eastern immigrants, it was later revealed by the media that the photos were not authentic, and were actually made on the set of the Netflix series Dogs of Berlin.

Medojević is recently known for often sensationalistic accusation of the ruling DPS politicians, as well as some leaders of rival political parties and liberal media journalists for betraying national interests. He even accused them of working in interest of a foreign intelligence service and a deep state, as well as kind of George Soros-backed, "globalist lobby". He had seen Soros as a kind of puppet master secretly controlling the global economy and politics. During late-December 2019, as a new law of legal status of religious communities was adopted by the Parliament of Montenegro, Medojević accused the Montenegrin authorities along with some media and NGOs of allegedly being part of the "Jewish banking, globalist and anti-christian plot", that are trying to "eliminate" Christian tradition, values and cultural identity of the country.

In 2020, Medojević declared COVID-19 as the work of "global Satanists" and "the pedophiles of the Deep State", spearheaded by Bill Gates and George Soros, whose real aim is to topple Donald Trump.

On 4 November 2020, Medojević congratulated the "electorial victory and re-election" to Donald Trump at the US presidential election, saying, "Biden's communists tried a coup by voting by letter. Caught in the act!”, sharing Trump's allegations of electoral fraud. He also claimed that COVID-19 is an "artificially isolated biological weapon". "The goal was the US elections. 7 days after the historic election theft, the pharmac. corp. promised to have the vaccine. The global deep state is the greatest threat to humanity", stated Medojević on his official Twitter account on 10 November.
