= Cetinje Gymnasium =

Location
- Bulevar Crnogorskih junaka 95; Cetinje 81250; Montenegro
- Coordinates: 42°23′44″N 18°54′48″E

Information
- Type: public school
- Established: 1880; 146 years ago
- Principal: Sanja Jelić
- Campus: Urban
- Website: gimnazijacetinje.me

The Cetinje Gymnasium (Montenegrin: Гимназија Цетиње / Цетињска гимназија) is a public coeducational high school (gymnasium, similar to preparatory school) located in Cetinje, historic capital city of Montenegro.

== History ==
Petar II Petrović-Njegoš founded the first secular school in Cetinje in 1834. In the second half of the 19th century, additional secondary schools were established, including the Theological-Teaching School, the Girls’ Institute in Cetinje, and agricultural schools in Danilovgrad and Podgorica.

Cetinje Gymnasium itself was openined in 1880. The new school was established by the decision of the State Council of the Principality of Montenegro under the name of Prince’s Montenegrin State Gymnasium. For the first five years, the school operated as a four-grade lower real gymnasium, with most of its teaching staff coming from abroad. The school was established on the initiative of Jovan Pavlović who was school's first principal and subsequently Minister of Education of Montenegro. The new school was initially located in the Biljarda building, with 16 students enrolled in its inaugural class. The new school implemented a curriculum closely modelled on that of comparable schools in the Kingdom of Serbia and Austria-Hungary. Up until 1883 there was no special law regulating the status of the institution.

By the early 20th century, neighbouring countries like Kingdom of Serbia and Kingdom of Croatia-Slavonia were teaching three to four foreign languages in their real gymnasiums, including German. To align with regional educational standards and prepare students for higher studies in Austria-Hungary and German Empire. The German language was formally introduced at the Cetinje Gymnasium in the 1903/1904 academic year, 23 years after the school’s founding. Prior to this, the gymnasium taught Russian, French, Greek, and Latin.

The Grand Gymnasium of Cetinje was opened in 1906 on the day of the celebration of Serbian Orthodox feast of Nativity of Mary. The opening ceremony was marked by a religious blessing of the building, attended by the representative of the Minister of Education, local officials, teachers, and their students. During the Montenegrin campaign in the period of World War I, gymnasium saved a smaller part of the library holdings of the National Museum of Montenegro.

During the interwar period in the Kingdom of Yugoslavia gymnasium operated from the representative building of the Blue Palace. During the 6 January Dictatorship, an incident occurred when large protest graffiti reading Živio komunizam (Long Live Communism) was painted on the wall.

During World War II in Yugoslavia, 381 students or alumni of the Cetinje Gymnasium were killed as members of the Yugoslav Partisan resistance, while 39 former students were later honoured as People’s Heroes of Yugoslavia.

== See also ==
- Theological Seminary of St. Peter of Cetinje
- Pljevlja Gymnasium
