= Dragan Hajduković =

Dragan S. Hajduković (Cyrillic: Драган С. Хајдуковић; born 11 June 1949 in Cetinje, PR Montenegro, FPR Yugoslavia), is a Montenegrin physics professor, astrophysicist and physicist, employed to CERN, environmental activist and perennial candidate.

In 2002 he became one of the founders of the Montenegrin green politics NGO and later political party Greens of Montenegro.

Hajduković was a candidate for the President of Montenegro four times, firstly in 1997 election, then in December 2002 and February 2003, both elections were declared invalid due to low turnout, and finally in May 2003, when he won the third place with 4.4% of votes. Hajduković had announced that he would run for president again in April 2008, as well in April 2018, but both times he did not manage to collect enough signatures to become an official candidate.
