= February 2003 Montenegrin presidential election =

- 9 February 2003
- Registered: 456,981
- Turnout: 46.73% (election invalid)
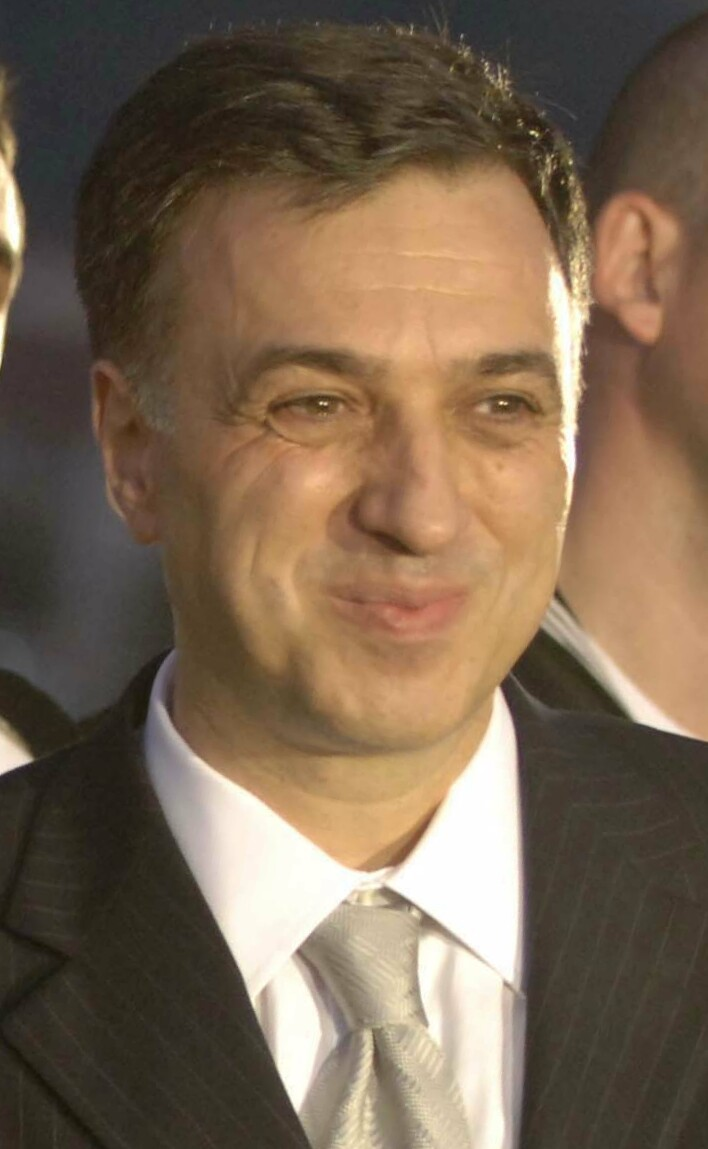

Nominee	Filip Vujanović	Dragan Hajduković
Party	DPS	Independent
Popular vote	174,536	14,556
Percentage	84.50%	7.05%
President before election
Filip Vujanović (acting)
DPS
Elected President
Filip Vujanović (acting)
DPS

Early presidential elections were held in the Republic of Montenegro on 9 February 2003, after the December 2002 elections had been declared invalid due to insufficient voter turnout.

== Background ==
The low turnout was caused by a boycott by the major opposition parties, voters being disillusioned with politics, and poor weather conditions on polling day which resulted in 80 polling stations in mountainous areas being closed due to snow.

== Results ==
Although Dragan Hajduković was a member of the Greens of Montenegro, he ran as an independent.

Candidate	Party	Votes	%
Filip Vujanović	Democratic Party of Socialists	174,536	84.50
Dragan Hajduković	Independent	14,556	7.05
Aleksandar Vasiljević	Serbian Radical Party	8,734	4.23
Milo Radulović	Natural Law Party	3,218	1.56
Jovan Pejović	Independent	1,076	0.52
Milan Šparović	Independent	1,037	0.50
Milivoje Bakić	Independent	942	0.46
Obrad Marković	Yugoslav Communists	894	0.43
Ilija Darmanović	Serb Radical Party of Montenegro	780	0.38
Mihailo Marković	Independent	456	0.22
Đorđije Milić	Independent	312	0.15
Total		206,541	100.00
Valid votes		206,541	96.72
Invalid/blank votes		7,001	3.28
Total votes		213,542	100.00
Registered voters/turnout		456,981	46.73
Source: IFES

== Aftermath ==
Although Filip Vujanović won the election with 85% of the vote, turnout was less than the required 50%, so the election was declared invalid. Fresh elections were called for May 2003, when the turnout rule was abolished.
