= 2002 Montenegrin presidential election =

- 22 December 2002
- Registered: 456,981
- Turnout: 45.87% (election invalid)
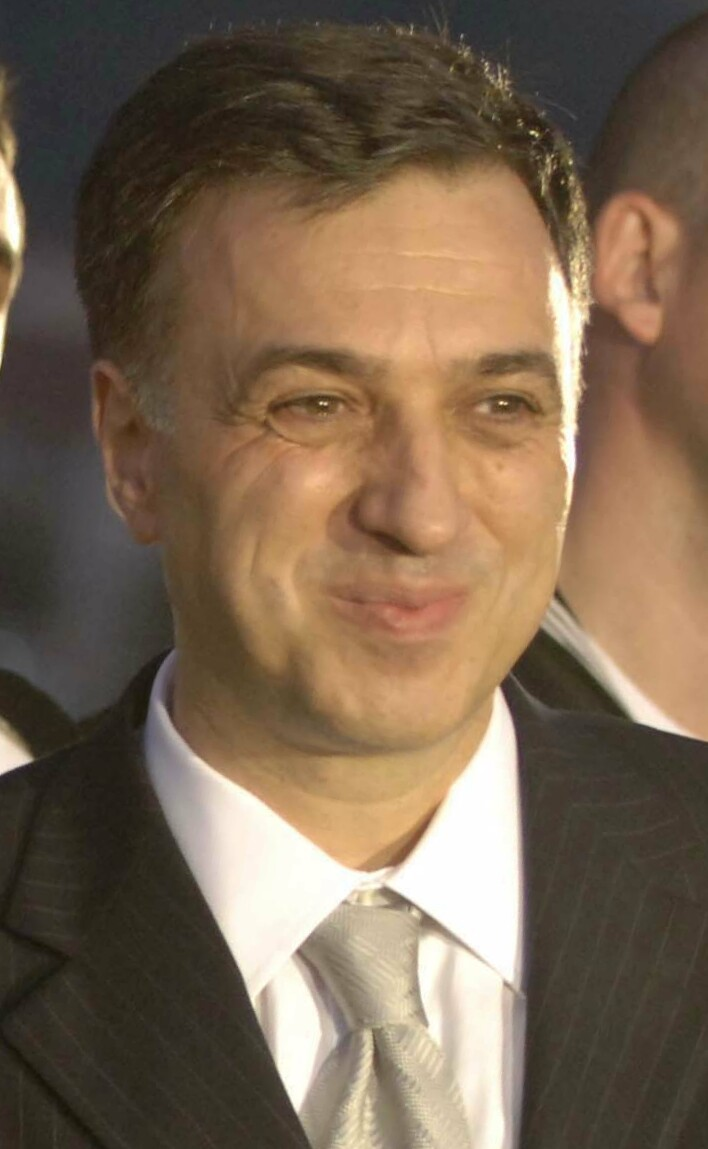

Nominee	Filip Vujanović	Dragan Hajduković
Party	DPS	Independent
Popular vote	175,328	12,319
Percentage	85.73%	6.02%
President before election
Filip Vujanović (acting)
DPS
Elected President
Filip Vujanović (acting)
DPS

Presidential elections were held in the Republic of Montenegro on 22 December 2002.

== Background ==
The elections were boycotted by the opposition Socialist People's Party, who accused the ruling Democratic Party of Socialists of pressurising civil servants to vote for Vujanović. The elections were also overshadowed by the arrest of Deputy State Attorney Zoran Piperović for connections with human trafficking and forced prostitution.

== Results ==
Although Dragan Hajduković was a member of the Greens of Montenegro, he ran as an independent.

Candidate	Party	Votes	%
Filip Vujanović	Democratic Party of Socialists	175,328	85.73
Dragan Hajduković	Independent	12,319	6.02
Aleksandar Vasiljević	Serbian Radical Party	6,448	3.15
Milo Radulović	Natural Law Party	3,115	1.52
Obrad Marković	Yugoslav Communists	1,747	0.85
Jovan Pejović	Independent	1,704	0.83
Milan Šparović	Independent	1,229	0.60
Ilija Darmanović	Serbian Radical Party of Montenegro	971	0.47
Milivoje Bakić	Independent	717	0.35
Đorđije Milić	Independent	489	0.24
Mihailo Marković	Independent	437	0.21
Total		204,504	100.00
Valid votes		204,504	97.57
Invalid/blank votes		5,094	2.43
Total votes		209,598	100.00
Registered voters/turnout		456,981	45.87
Source: IFES

== Aftermath ==
Although Filip Vujanović won the election with 86% of the vote, turnout was less than the required 50%, so the election was declared invalid. Fresh elections were held in February 2003, which were also invalidated, and then again in May when the turnout rule was abolished.
