= Orders, decorations, and medals of the Serbian Orthodox Church =

Orders, decorations, and medals of Serbian Orthodox Church (Serbian: Одликовања Српске православне цркве) represents a system of decorations awarded by Holy Synod of Bishops of Serbian Orthodox Church as a general church or dioceses as their own decorations. In the Constitution of the Serbian Orthodox Church (Article 55, item 10) from 1957 provides that church decorations and decorations are awarded by Serbian Patriarch, according to the decree prescribed by Holy Synod of Bishops. Proposals for the decoration of clergy are given by diocesan archbishops (archbishop, metropolitans, bishops), and the decision is made by Holy Synod of Bishops. Also, it is envisaged that Archbishops may decorate persons themselves, with those decorations whose award is within their competence, i.e. with diocesan decorations Constitution of the Serbian Orthodox Church, Article 108, item 12).

== History ==
Serbian Orthodox Church did not award special decorations before 1945. With the coming to power of the communism in Yugoslavia, that is, the fall of the monarchy and the introduction of complete separation of state and church, there was a need for the introduction of special church recognitions in the form of decorations.

The first decoration Serbian Orthodox Church appeared in 1946, on the occasion of the 600th anniversary of the rise of the Serbian church from the archbishopric to the patriarchate, or the enthronement of the first Serbian Patriarch Joanikije. The "Order of the Holy Patriarch Ioannicius" was awarded only to dioceses in North America.

The Bishop of Raška and Prizren Artemije Radosavljević established the first modern church decoration in the country, and that was the Medal of Mother Jugović, which was awarded to mothers with several children.

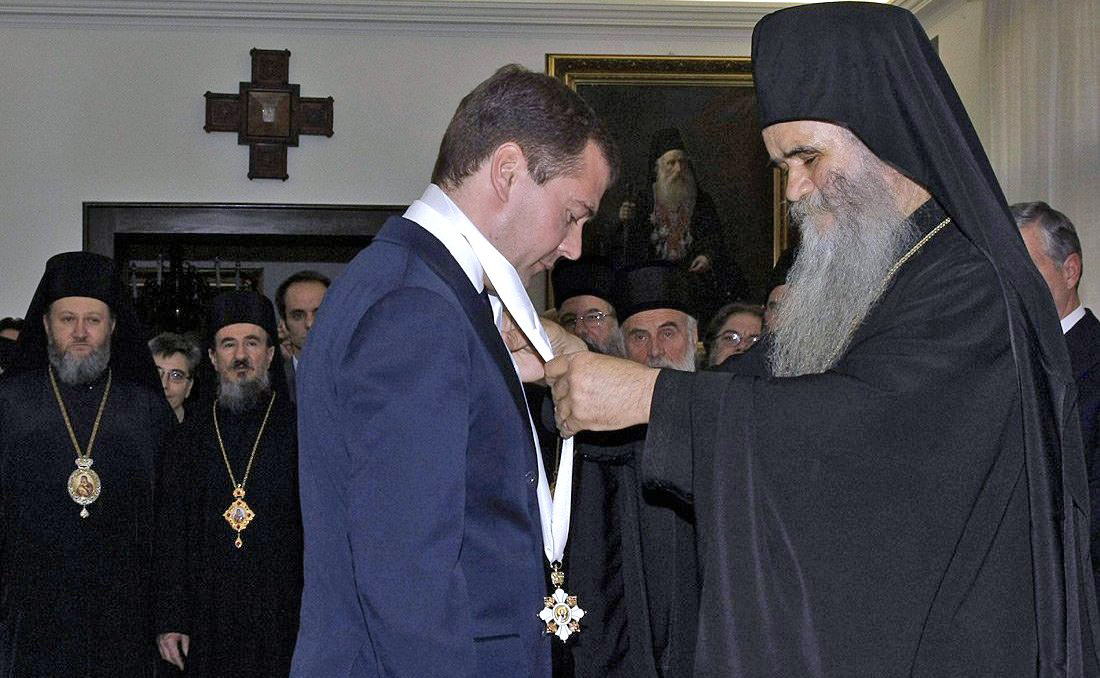
Metropolitan of Montenegro and the Littoral Amfilohije decorates Dmitry Medvedev, President of the Russian Federation, with the Order of Saint Sava (October 20, 2013)

Since 1985 Holy Synod of Bishops Serbian Orthodox Church awards Order of Saint Sava, which was originally established as a state decoration, by decree king Milan Obrenović from 23 January 1883 and was awarded until 1945 when he continued to award it to the elder royal family Karađorđević as a dynastic decoration, so that today there are two orders of St. Sava: church and royal.

== General decorations ==
1. Order of Saint Sava
2. Order of the Holy King Milutin – Awarded for patronage and charity.
3. Order of Saint Peter of Cetinje – Awarded for missionary work, peacemaking, evangelization and personal feat.
4. Order of the Holy Stefan Lazarević – Awarded for science, culture, literature, translation and humanities.
5. Order of the Holy Empress Milica (Reverend Nun Evgenija) – It is awarded for acts of philanthropy.
6. Order of Saint Simeon the Myrrh-flowing – It is awarded to improve the relationship between church and state. It was once awarded by the Bishop of Šumadija, but it became a general church order.
7. Order of the Holy Emperor Constantine – Awarded for contribution to freedom of religion and human rights.
8. Order of Saint John Vladimir

== Diocesan decorations ==
=== Archbishopric of Montenegro and the Littoral ===
1. Golden figure of St. Peter the Second Lovćenski Tajnovidac (unbearable recognition)

=== Metropolitanate of Dabar-Bosnia ===
1. Order of Saint Peter

=== Metropolitanate of Zagreb-Ljubliana ===
1. Order of Cantacuzino Katarina Branković

=== Eparchy of Banat ===
1. Order of Saint Theodore of Vršac

=== Eparchy of Budimlje-Nikšić ===
1. Jubilee Monument (Đurđevi Stupovi Monastery) - with the image of The holy, glorious and right-victorious Great-martyr and Trophy-bearer George

=== Eparchy of Valjevo ===
1. Order of Saint Nicholas of Serbia (Diocese of Valjevo)

=== Eparchy of Vranje ===
1. Order of the Venerable Prohor Pčinjski

=== Eparchy of Upper Karlovac ===
1. Order of the Holy Martyrs of Karlovac

=== Eparchy of Dalmatia ===
1. Order of Dr. Nikodim Milas

=== Eparchy of Žiča ===
1. Order of Saint Simeon the Monk - established by Bishop of Žička by Stefan the First-Crowned

=== Eparchy of Zvornik-Tuzla ===
1. Order of the Holy King Dragutin – Venerable Theoctist

=== Eparchy of Mileševo ===
1. Order of the White Angel

=== Eparchy of Niš ===
1. Order of Saint Constantine
2. Order of Saint Roman

=== Eparchy of Bihać and Petrovac ===
1. Order of the New Martyrs of Bihać-Petrovac

=== Eparchy of Osijek-Polje and Baranja ===
1. Order of the Holy Prince Stefan Štiljanović

=== Eparchy of Raška and Prizren ===
1. Order of the Holy Prince Lazar
2. Mother Jugović Medal

=== Eparchy of Syrmia ===
1. Order of Prince Daniel the First
2. Order of Saint Arsenije Sremec
3. Order of Saint Maxim Branković

=== Eparchy of Šabac ===
1. Order of Saint Nicholas of Serbia

=== Eparchy of Šumadija ===
1. Order of Crusader Karađorđe

== Institutional decorations ==
=== Orthodox Theological Faculty of St. Vasilije Ostroški in Foča ===
1. Medal of Saint Vasilije Ostroški

== Former decorations ==
Order of Saint Simeon the Myrrh-flowing was once awarded by Bishop of Šumadija, but it has been translated into general church decorations.

Until the separation of Diocese of Šabac and Valjevo, the Diocese of Šabac and Valjevo awarded the Order of St. Nicholas of Serbia. After the separation of the two dioceses, both continued to award this order, with the same name but a different stylistic solution.
