= 2008 Montenegrin presidential election =

Presidential election held in Montenegro

← 2003	6 April 2008	2013 →
- Registered: 490,412
- Turnout: 68.20% (▲19.88pp)
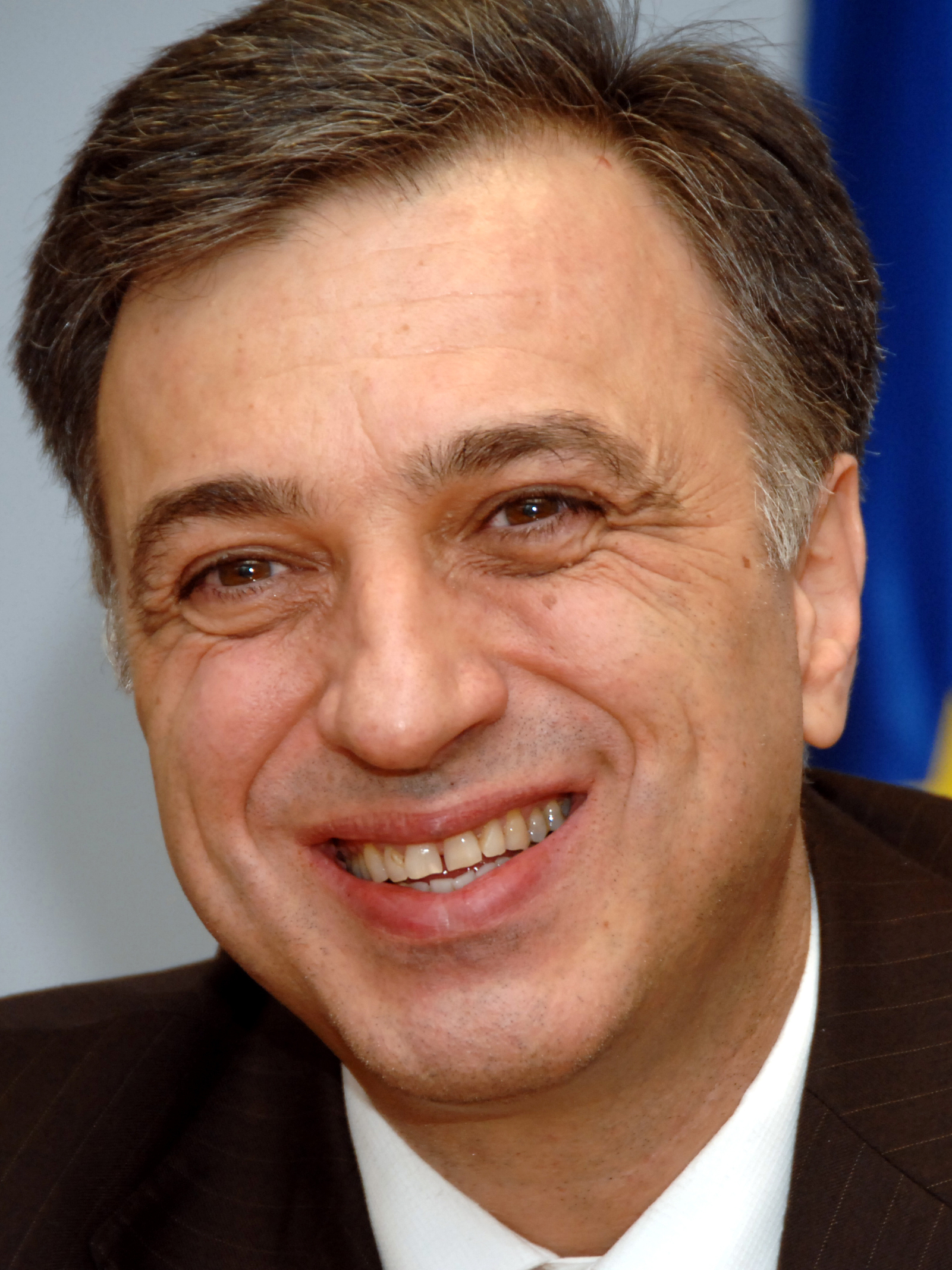

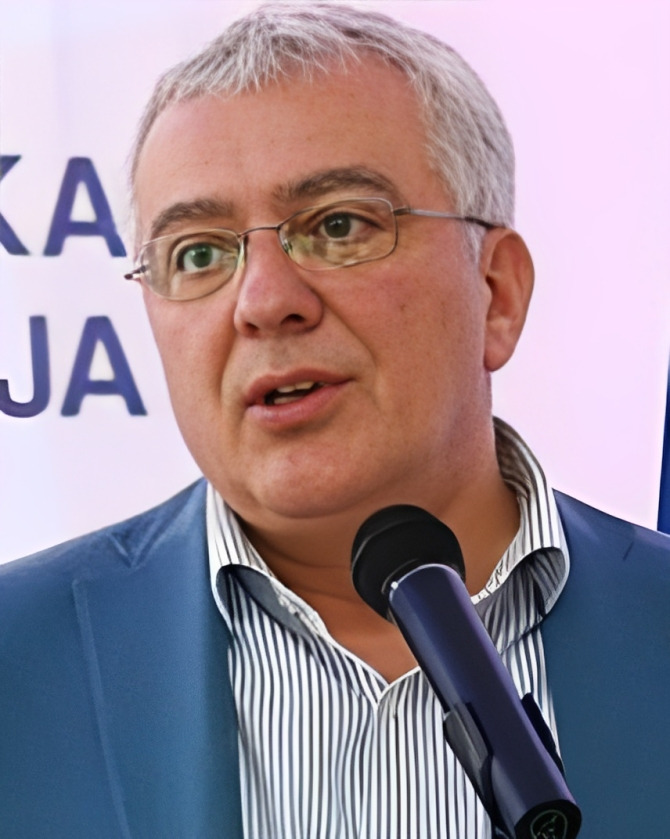

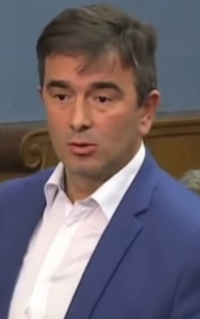

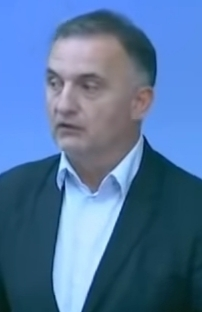
Candidate	Filip Vujanović	Andrija Mandić
Party	DPS	SNS
Popular vote	171,118	64,473
Percentage	51.89%	19.55%
Candidate	Nebojša Medojević	Srđan Milić
Party	PzP	SNP
Popular vote	54,874	39,316
Percentage	16.64%	11.92%
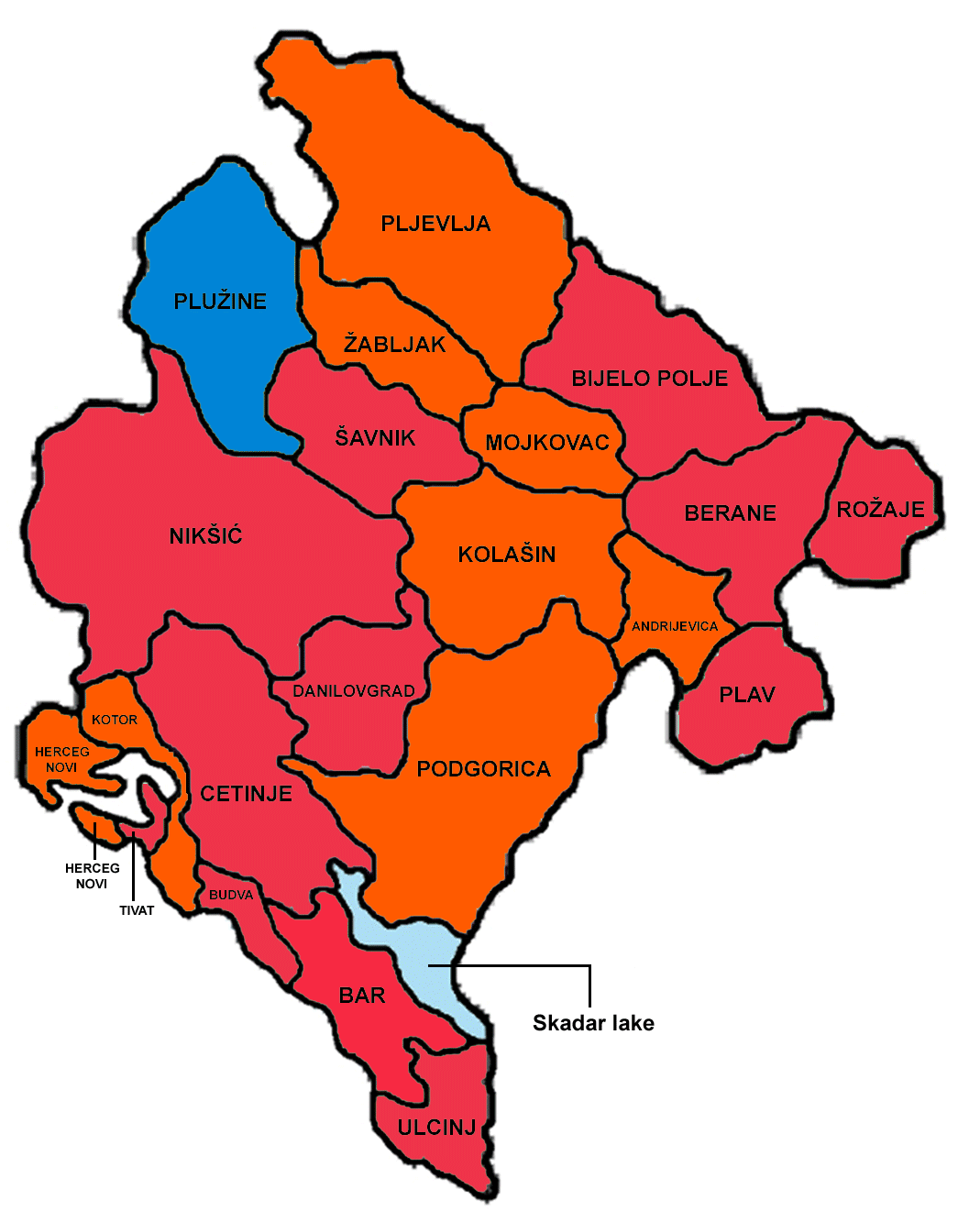
- Results by municipality absolute majority for Vujanović relative majority for Vujanović relative majority for Milić
President before election
Filip Vujanović
DPS
Elected President
Filip Vujanović
DPS

Presidential elections were held in Montenegro on 6 April 2008, the first after independence in 2006. The result was a victory for incumbent President Filip Vujanović, who received 52% of the vote.

== Electoral system ==
The law on presidential elections was passed on 27 December 2007, requiring candidates to collect the signatures of 1.5% of registered voters in order to run.

== Candidates ==
=== Democratic Party of Socialists ===
The ruling Democratic Party of Socialists nominated the current president of Montenegro, Filip Vujanović. He was supported by DPS' coalition partner, the Social Democratic Party of Montenegro, as well as Croatian Civic Initiative, the Democratic Union of Albanians and the Democratic Community of Muslims Bosniacs in Montenegro.

=== Opposition ===
After proposals for a common candidate of the opposition failed, all opposition currents nominated their own Presidents as candidates.

==== Serb People's Party ====
Andrija Mandić, the leader of the Serb People's Party (SNS), was nominated as a common candidate of the Serb List (SL) political alliance. He held demonstrations in the nation's capital of Podgorica on 24 February 2008 against Kosovo's recent unilateral declaration of independence.

==== Movement for Changes ====
The Movement for Changes (PzP) nominated its leader Nebojša Medojević. Medojević was also supported by the Albanian Alternative (AA) and the FORCA. The AA, accusing DPS's regime of terror and disrespect of ethnic Albanians of Montenegro.

==== Socialist People's Party ====
The Socialist People's Party of Montenegro (SNP) chose Srđan Milić, leader of the party, as their candidate.

==== Other parties ====
The Bosniak Party decided, like two Albanian minority parties, to abstain from endorsing any candidate. The People's Party decided unanimously on 3 February 2008 that it would not participate in the election, but it supported the two opposition candidates that represent parties of the former pro-Serbian bloc.

==== Independents ====
Professor Blagota Mitrić of the Faculty of Law of University of Montenegro had announced that he would run for president, yet he did not manage to collect enough signatures to become an official candidate. This was also the case with Dragan Hajduković, an environmentalist who had been a regular participant in the previous presidential runs.

Vasilije Miličković, president of the Association of Minority Shareholders of the Montenegrin Electric Enterprise, had announced that he would run for president as an independent candidate only if the former president and prime minister Milo Đukanović also ran for that position.

== Opinion polls ==
Polls and analysts claimed Vujanović would most surely win the largest number of votes and face-off with Medojevic in the second round. Since Vujanovic won over 50 percent of the vote in the first round there was no need for a runoff.

Pollster	Vujanović	Medojević	Mandić	Milić	Others	Lead
CEDEM (March)	52.8	18.3	19.1	9.8	—	33.7
IPRES	30.6	20.6	30.2	18.6	—	0.4
CEDEM (February)	49.5	21.2	14.8	9.9	4.6	34.7

== Results ==
Candidate	Party	Votes	%
Filip Vujanović	Democratic Party of Socialists	171,118	51.89
Andrija Mandić	Serb People's Party	64,473	19.55
Nebojša Medojević	Movement for Changes	54,874	16.64
Srđan Milić	Socialist People's Party	39,316	11.92
Total		329,781	100.00
Valid votes		329,781	98.60
Invalid/blank votes		4,674	1.40
Total votes		334,455	100.00
Registered voters/turnout		490,412	68.20
Source: OCSE
