= Srđan Milić =

Montenegrin politician (born 1965)

Srđan Milić Срђан Милић
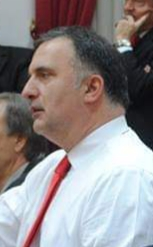
- Srđan Milić in April 2014

Member of Parliament
- In office 20 October 2002 – 30 August 2020
- President: Ranko Krivokapić; Darko Pajović; Ivan Brajović

Personal details
- Born: 17 September 1965 (age 61) Bar, SFR Yugoslavia
- Party: Socialist People's Party
- Education: University of Dubrovnik
- Profession: Entrepreneur, politician

Srđan Milić (Serbian Cyrillic: Срђан Милић; born September 17, 1965) is a Montenegrin politician and Member of the Parliament of Montenegro, from 2002 to 2020 and former leader of the Socialist People's Party, from 2006 until his resignation in 2017. He was a candidate for President of Montenegro in 2008.

== Background ==
Milić was born in the coastal city of Bar, at that time part of the Socialist Republic of Montenegro of SFR Yugoslavia. His family hails from Bjelice.

He declared himself to be Serb ethnicity and Serbian language native speaker. He studied at the Faculty for Outer Trade and Tourism at the University of Dubrovnik in SR Croatia, also learning English, Italian and German and computer skills. After graduation, he permanently moved to Budva, where he got married and had three children. He worked in the field of tourism from 1983 to 1990. In 1991 and 1992, he was an assistant at the University of Montenegro's Faculty of Tourism and Hotel Management in Kotor.

=== Politics ===
From 1992 to 2002 he worked as an entrepreneur, when he entered the world of politics, joining Predrag Bulatović's reformed Socialist People's Party of Montenegro. In the party, he dedicated his life to the research of the European Union and European integrations of outside countries.

A member of both the Main Board of the SNP and the Main Board's Executive Committee, he was elected President of SNP CG's Commission for European and Euro-Atlantic integration. In the 2006 parliamentary election, he was elected into the parliament on the SNP-NS-DSS coalition's list. Over the years, he attended and held numerous conferences across the European continent on the subject of European integrations.

After President Bulatović's resignation for a catastrophically poor rating at an election, Milić was elected President of the Socialist People's Party on 26 November 2006. Becoming chief of SNP's parliamentary club, he distanced the party from its traditional partners the People's Party and Democratic Serb Party, introducing the prime element of European Social Democracy in SNP's political ideology. He rendered the party a strong supporter of European Union enlargement and promoted a shift in Montenegrin standard politics. He is a member of the Montenegrin Parliament's Commission for European Integration.

He has said that he loves Serbia and Russia, and that Montenegro did a big mistake in supporting sanctions against Russia.
