= Miodrag Lekić =

Montenegrin politician (born 1947)

Miodrag Lekić Миодраг Лекић
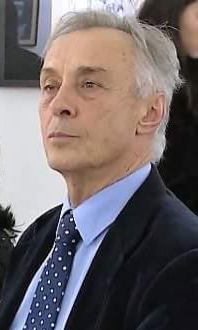
- Miodrag Lekić in February 2015.

Member of Parliament
- Incumbent
- Assumed office 14 October 2012
- President: Ranko Krivokapić; Darko Pajović; Ivan Brajović; Aleksa Bečić; Danijela Đurović

Personal details
- Born: 21 November 1947 (age 78) Bar, PR Montenegro, Yugoslavia
- Party: DEMOS (2015–present); Independent (until 2015)
- Other political affiliations: Democratic Front (2012–2015)
- Education: University of Belgrade
- Website: Official website

Miodrag Lekić (Montenegrin Cyrillic: Миодраг Лекић; born 21 November 1947) is a Montenegrin political scientist, diplomat and politician. He is the founder and current president of the liberal conservative Democratic Alliance (DEMOS).

== Biography ==
=== Early academic and political career ===
Lekić studied political science with focus on international relations at the University of Belgrade, graduating in 1971. He worked as a professor at "Niko Rolović" gymnasium and was a director of cultural and informative center in his hometown of Bar. He received a French government scholarship to further his studies at the Paris-Sorbonne University from 1976 to 1977. In 1986 he became a member of the government of SR Montenegro, and in 1987 he was a member of the SFR Yugoslavia delegation for UNESCO cooperation.

=== Diplomatic career ===
From 1990 to 1992, Lekić served as ambassador of the SFR Yugoslavia in Mozambique, Swaziland, and Lesotho. From August 1992 to May 1995, he was the minister of foreign affairs of the Republic of Montenegro. Subsequently, he became Yugoslav ambassador to Italy and Malta for two terms (1995-1999 and 2001-2003). Between 1999 and 2001 he worked for the United Nations's Food and Agriculture Organization (FAO). During his second term he received a wide media attention for his strong criticism of NATO intervention in Yugoslavia during the Kosovo War, most notably on the Porta a Porta talk show.

In 2003, Lekić fell out with the new Montenegrin president Milo Đukanović, leader of the ruling DPS, and left the Yugoslav diplomatic service.

=== Academic career in Italy ===
Lekić became a lecturer at the LUISS Guido Carli in Rome. He taught comparative politics from 2003 to 2004, international negotiation technique from 2004 to 2012 and diplomacy from 2012 to 2013. At the same time, he lectured international relations and negotiation technique at the faculty of humanities, Sapienza University of Rome from 2005 to 2007.

=== Return to Montenegrin politics ===
In 2011, he founded the Center for International Policy and European Integration (CEMP) in Podgorica.

In 2012, he became the leader of the opposition alliance Democratic Front formed by the Movement for Changes (PzP) and the New Serb Democracy (NOVA). He led the alliance's list in the parliamentary election of October 2012.

Lekić ran in the 2013 presidential election, supported by entire Montenegrin opposition both his Democratic Front, the Socialist People's Party (SNP) and Positive Montenegro (PCG). According to the electoral committee's report, he was narrowly defeated by incumbent Filip Vujanović. However, many independent observers insisted that Vujanović's victory came about as the result of an electoral fraud, which resulted in a number of demonstrations of Lekić's supporters.

Following internal disagreements within the coalition, Lekić split from Democratic Front and formed the new centre-right political party, Democratic Alliance (DEMOS) on 18 May 2015, announcing its two main goals: making Montenegro into a legal and decriminalised country and unifying the opposition.
