= Jovan Pavlović (politician) =

Serbian minister and newspaper publisher

Jovan Pavlović (Sremski Karlovci, Austrian Empire, 10 February 1843 – Cetinje, Principality of Montenegro, 6 April 1892) was the founder of the newspaper Pančevac in Pančevo in 1869, and Minister of Education in Montenegro, from 1885 to 1892.

He first studied jurisprudence at Belgrade's Velika škola in 1863, and continued his education in social sciences in Geneva and Munich, where he completed his studies in sociology.

Invited by Dr. Ljubomir Nenadović to head the staff of the newly-founded Commercial College in Pančevo, 25-year-old Jovan Pavlović, recent graduate of the Ludwig-Maximilians-Universität München, arrived in mid-1868 with an ambition to assume the post of dean and launch a newspaper Pančevac. His career met with success despite the challenges of the time and place.

== Sources ==
- Министар Јован Павловић, часопис: Босанска Вила, Сарајево, 10. 4. 1892., pp. 160
- Јован Павловић, Министарство просвјете
- Јован Павловић Биографија
