= Nikola Kovačević (politician) =

Montenegrin politician and revolutionary

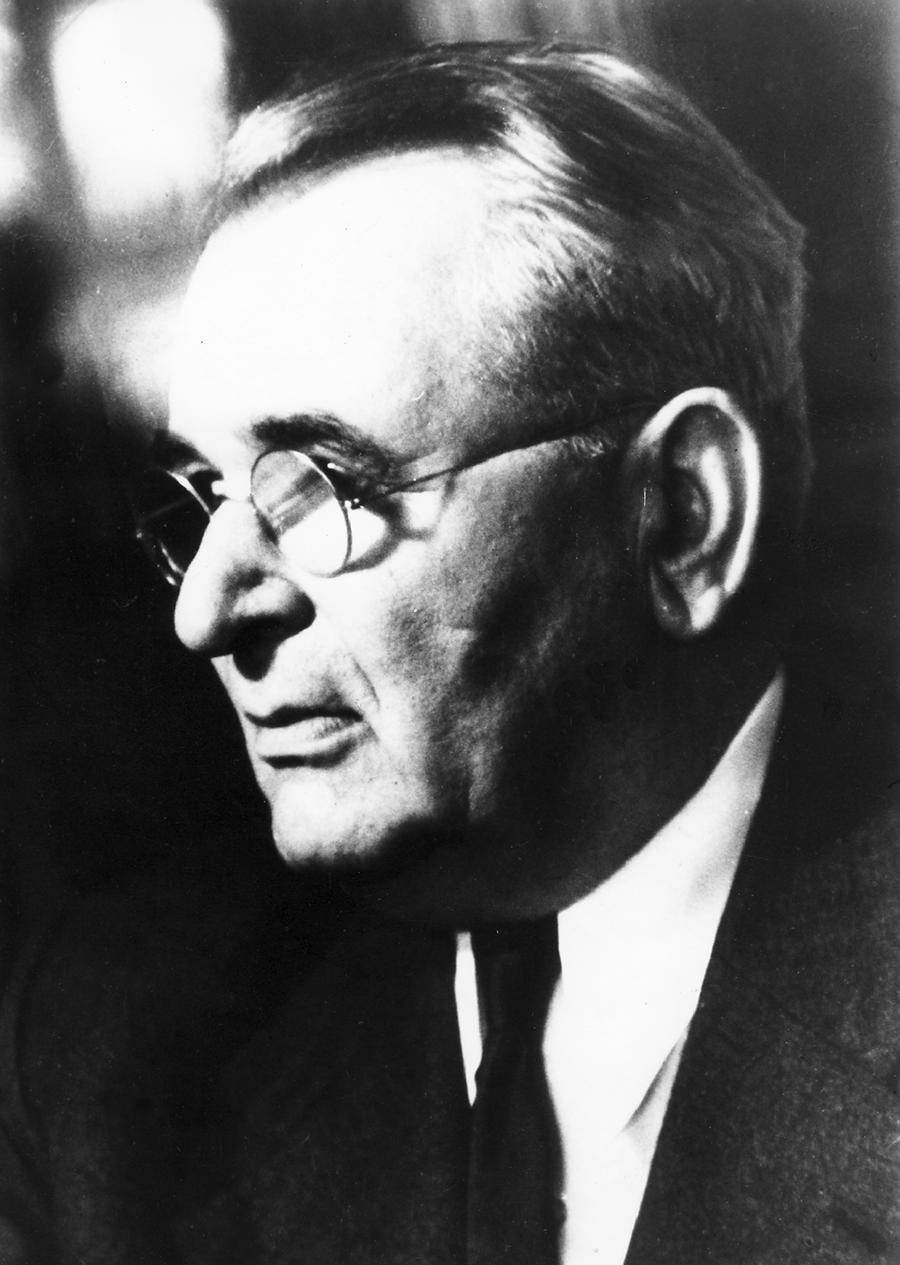

Nikola Kovačević (Cyrillic: Никола Ковачевић; 12 December 1890 – 24 August 1964) was a Montenegrin communist politician and revolutionary, member of Communist Party of Yugoslavia, one of the founders of Communist Party of Montenegro and Head of State of the People's Republic of Montenegro from 1950 to 1953. He was brother of Sava Kovačević, People's Liberation Army commander and People's Hero of Yugoslavia.

He was a member of the Communist Party of Yugoslavia since 1920. From 6 November 1950 to 4 February 1953 he held the office of President of the Presidency of the National Assembly, and from 4 February to 19 December 1953 the office of President of the National Assembly of the People's Republic of Montenegro.

His great-granddaughter is Irena Vujović, a Serbian government minister.
