= Blue Palace =

Official residence of the President of Montenegro

- Плави дворац
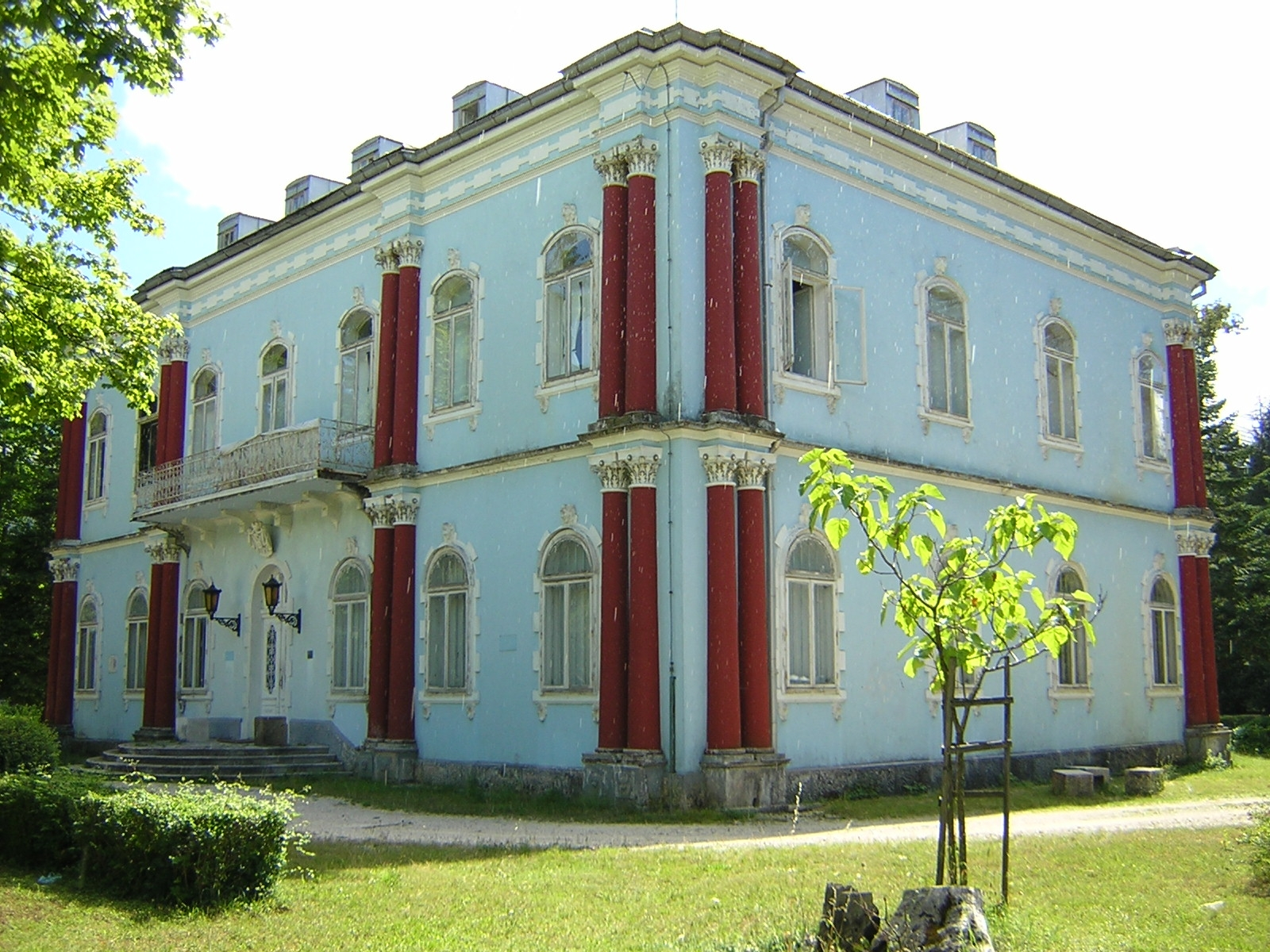
- Blue Palace
- Interactive map of the Blue Palace area

General information
- Location: Cetinje, Montenegro
- Coordinates: 42°23′09″N 18°55′35″E
- Current tenants: President of Montenegro
- Completed: 1894–1895

The Blue Palace (Montenegrin: Плави дворац, romanized: Plavi dvorac) is the official residence of the President of Montenegro.

It was built in 1894–1895 in late Empire style as the residence of Crown Prince Danilo of Montenegro, then heir-apparent to the throne. The building was a model for the construction of other buildings for the members of the Petrović-Njegoš dynasty throughout Montenegro. During the interwar period in the Kingdom of Yugoslavia, the building housed the Cetinje Gymnasium, while in the era of the Socialist Republic of Montenegro it was converted into a gallery and museum.
