= Filip Vujanović =

First President of the independent Montenegro (2006-2018)

- Филип Вујановић
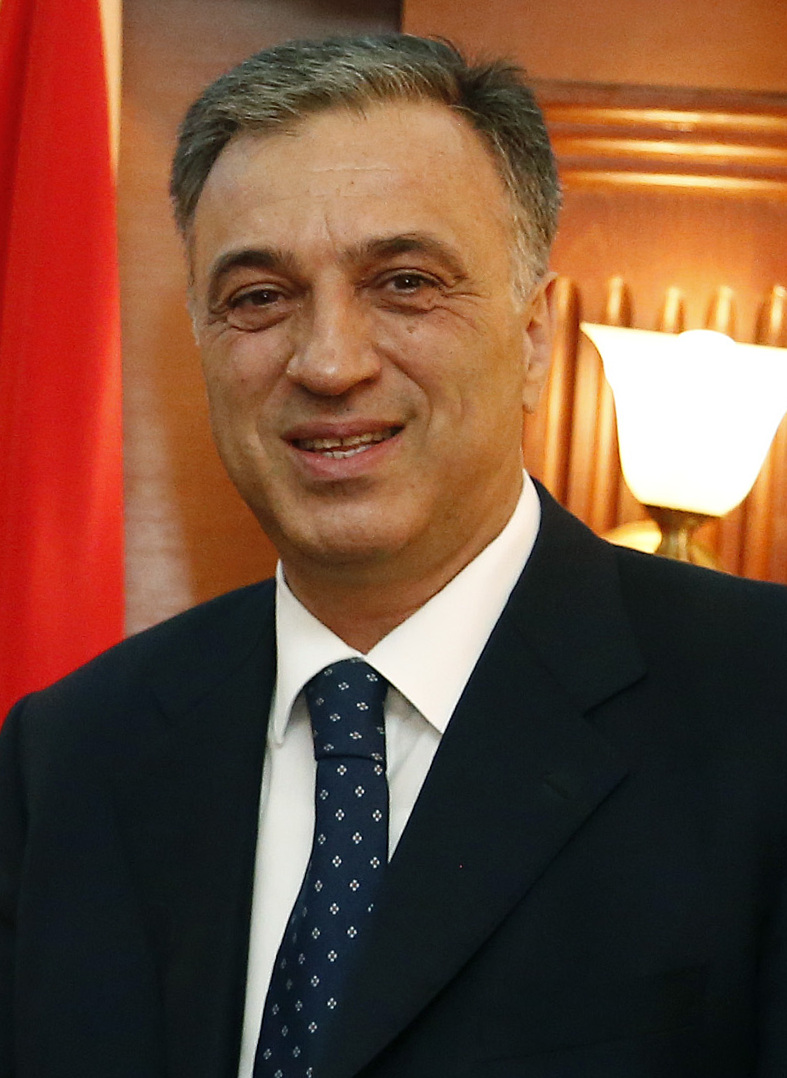
- Vujanović in 2015

1st President of Montenegro
- In office 3 June 2006 – 20 May 2018
- Prime Minister: Milo Đukanović; Željko Šturanović; Milo Đukanović; Igor Lukšić; Milo Đukanović; Duško Marković
- Preceded by: Himself (as President of Montenegro within Serbia and Montenegro)
- Succeeded by: Milo Đukanović

3rd President of Montenegro within FR Yugoslavia/Serbia and Montenegro
- In office 19 May 2003 – 3 June 2006 (Note: As last president of the Montenegro within FR Yugoslavia/Serbia and Montenegro from 22 May 2003 until Montenegro became an independent state on 3 June 2006)
- Prime Minister: Milo Đukanović
- President of FR Yugoslavia/Serbia and Montenegro: Vojislav Koštunica; Svetozar Marović
- Preceded by: Dragan Kujović (Acting)
- Succeeded by: Himself (as President of independent Montenegro)
- In office 25 November 2002 – 19 May 2003; Acting
- Prime Minister: Milo Đukanović
- President of Serbia and Montenegro: Vojislav Koštunica
- Preceded by: Milo Đukanović
- Succeeded by: Dragan Kujović (Acting); Himself

President of the Parliament
- In office 5 November 2002 – 30 July 2003
- Preceded by: Vesna Perović
- Succeeded by: Ranko Krivokapić

Prime Minister of Montenegro
- In office 5 February 1998 – 5 November 2002
- President: Milo Đukanović
- Preceded by: Milo Đukanović
- Succeeded by: Dragan Đurović (Acting)

Personal details
- Born: 1 September 1954 (age 72) Belgrade, PR Serbia, FPR Yugoslavia
- Party: DPS (since 1993)
- Height: 2.00 m (6 ft 7 in)
- Spouse: Svetlana Vujanović (m. 1985)
- Children: 3
- Education: University of Belgrade
- Website: Official website

Filip Vujanović (Montenegrin Cyrillic: Филип Вујановић, pronounced [fîlip ʋǔjanɔʋit͡ɕ]; born 1 September 1954) is a Montenegrin politician who served as the 3rd president of the Republic of Montenegro under Serbia and Montenegro from 2002 to 2006, and the 1st president of independent Montenegro from 2006 to 2018.

== Early life and career ==
Born and raised in Belgrade, Vujanović graduated from the University of Belgrade's Law School. Between 1978 and 1981 he worked in one of the city's Municipal Courts, and later also as an assistant at the Belgrade District Court. In 1981, aged 27, he moved to Titograd. Following a short stint as secretary at Titograd's District Court, he worked as a lawyer until entering politics in March 1993.

== Career in politics ==
Vujanović joined the Democratic Party of Socialists (DPS) in 1993 upon the invitation of Montenegrin federal President Momir Bulatović following the creation of the Federal Republic of Yugoslavia (comprising Montenegro and Serbia) in the wake of the break-up of the previous Yugoslavia.

He was Minister of Justice in Milo Đukanović's pro-Slobodan Milošević government (1993–1996), and then Interior Minister from 1996 to 1998 after Đukanović switched loyalty and turned against Milošević. During the 1997 DPS leadership conflict, Vujanović initially declared neutrality. He eventually sided with Milo Đukanović after Đukanović won the presidential election. Đukanović then appointed Vujanović as the first Prime Minister of Montenegro; Vujanović served in that post from 5 February 1998 until 8 January 2003.

== President of Montenegro ==
On 5 November 2002, he became speaker of the Montenegrin parliament, a position which, from 25 November 2002, made him Acting President of Montenegro due to the resignation of Đukanović from the presidency to prepare to switch office with Vujanović. Vujanović ran in the December 2002 presidential elections and won a landslide victory, receiving 86% of the vote, but the election was ruled invalid because turnout was less than 50%. The elections were held again in February 2003, with Vujanović winning 81% of the vote, but again turnout was below 50%. The elections were held for a third time on 11 May 2003, with the minimum turnout rule abolished, and Vujanović won again with 63% of the vote.

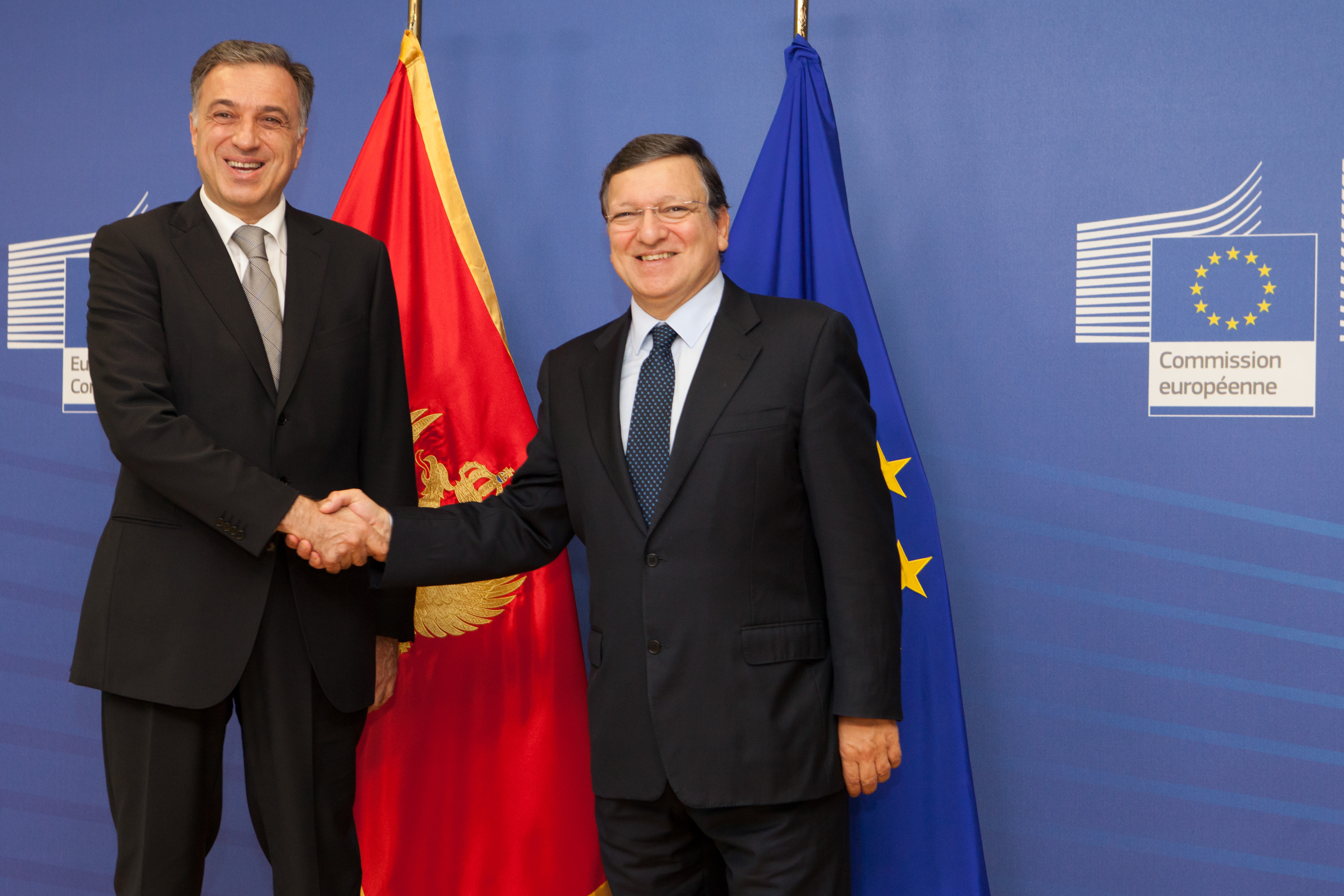
Vujanović with President of the European Commission José Manuel Barroso in Brussels on 15 October 2013

Vujanović resigned from his positions as speaker and acting president on 19 May 2003 but became president of Montenegro again three days later when his term began. Even though he was born in Serbia, he was one of the most prominent Montenegrin secessionists. As president of Montenegro, Vujanović was a supporter of the Montenegro Independence Referendum, though Prime Minister Đukanović was much more high-profile in his campaign for it. Vujanović's messages often focus on Montenegro's and Serbia's ability to have a peaceful separation and post-independence cooperation, and he is friends with former Serbian president Boris Tadić. On 21 May 2006, an independence referendum was held in Montenegro; it was approved by 55.5% of voters, narrowly passing the 55% threshold. On 3 June 2006, Montenegro became an independent state.

On 14 December 2006, he signed the Framework Document for the accession to the Partnership for Peace Programme, wherewith Montenegro became a member of the NATO program "Partnership for Peace". During the press conference that President Vujanovic and Secretary General of NATO, Jaap de Hoop Scheffer held after signing the Partnership for Peace Framework Document, Scheffer welcomed the way Montenegro decided to go towards the European integrations.

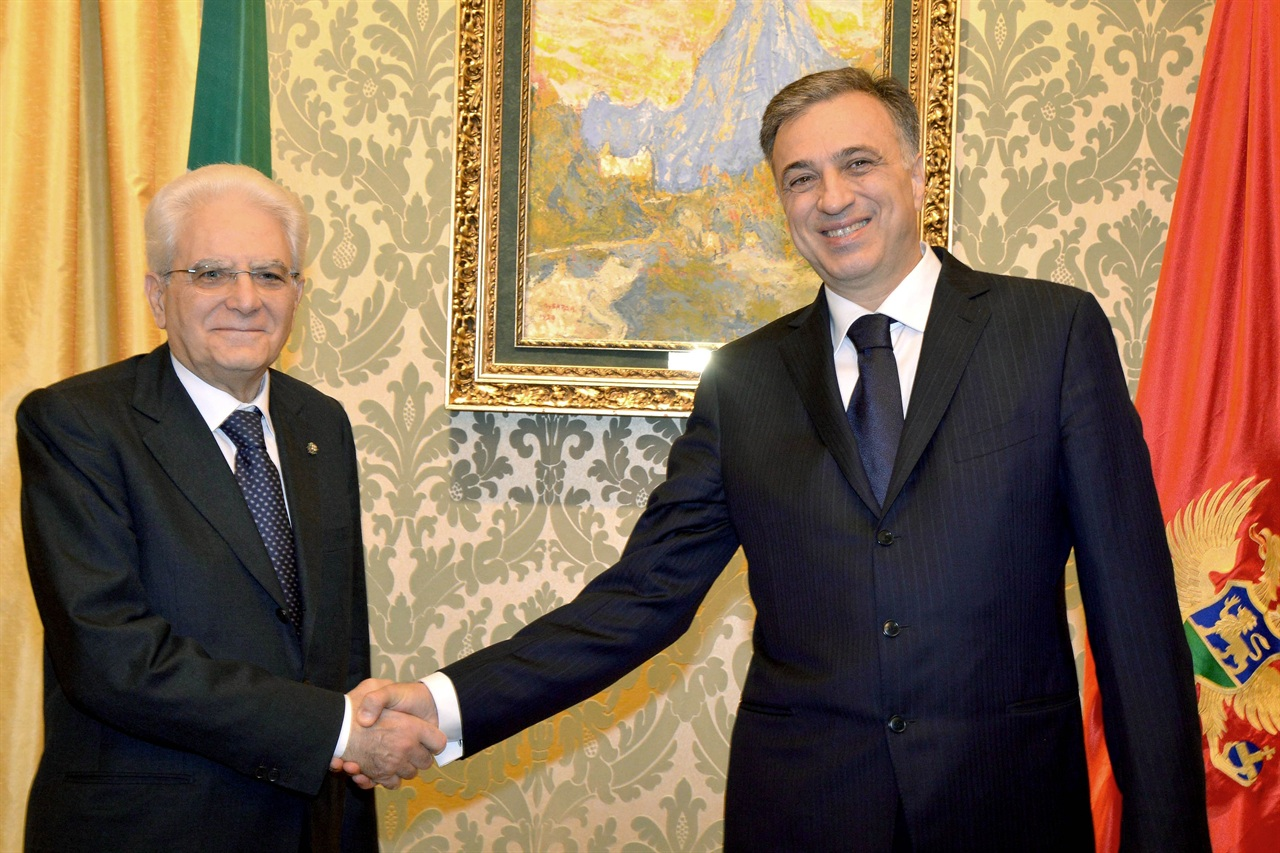
President Filip Vujanović with President of Italy Sergio Mattarella, Blue Palace, Cetinje in May 2015

In April 2007, President Vujanović declared he would protect the property of the main religious institution in Montenegro, the Serbian Orthodox Church during an attempt of the non-canonical Montenegrin Orthodox Church to forcibly seize its property. At the 2008 presidential election, Vujanović ran for the second presidential term, and secured another five years in office in the first election round, with 51.89% vote. The turnout was 68.2%.

On 20 January 2012, Vujanović adopted the Decision on Calling Elections for the MPs of the local Parliament of Tivat and the local Parliament of Herceg Novi. On 28 March 2012, Vujanović, after carrying out consultations with the Bar Association of Montenegro, the Association of Judges of Montenegro, Law faculties, the Academy of Sciences, Extended Session of the Supreme Court of Montenegro, appointed four members of the Judicial Council, that were judges of the Constitutional Court of Montenegro.

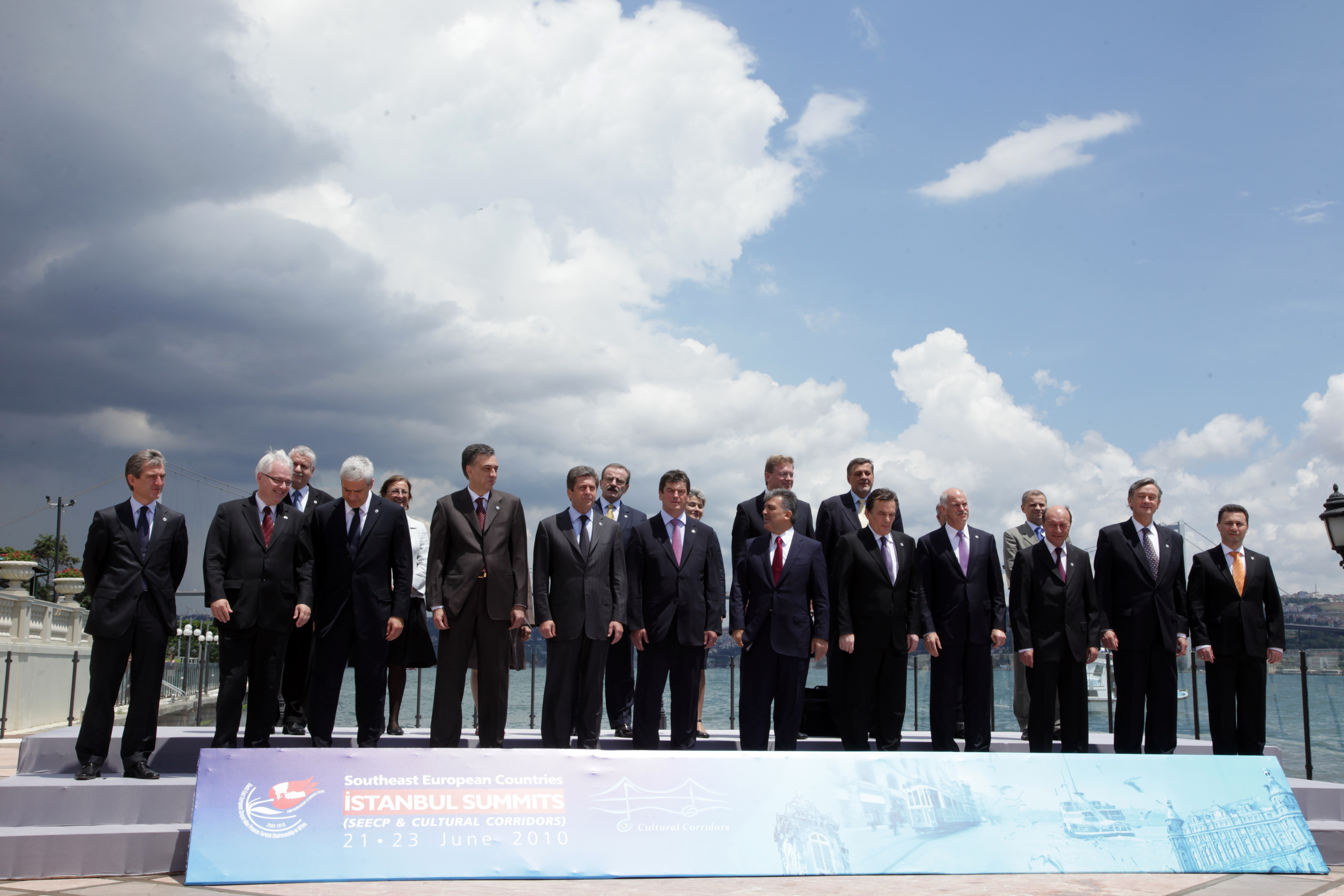
President Filip Vujanović with Southeast European leaders pose for a family photo during the SEECP Summit in Istanbul, Turkey, 23 June 2010

On 31 July 2012, President Vujanović passed a Decision on Calling Elections for Members of the Parliament of Montenegro. The parliamentary elections were held on 14 October and were won by the Coalition for European Montenegro, dominated by DPS. Following the elections, on 4 December 2012, Vujanović destined Đukanović as Prime Minister.

In February 2013, the Constitutional Court officially approved Vujanović's candidacy for a new term, noting that for his 2003–2008 term, he was elected as President of the Republic of Montenegro as a constituent entity within its state union with Serbia and served as de facto independent head of state only in 2006–2008, meaning that his 2008–2013 term is legally his first term. At the 2013 presidential election Vujanović won the election for a third presidential term, with 51.2% of the vote against the Democratic Front opposition alliance nominee, Miodrag Lekić.

=== Foreign policy ===
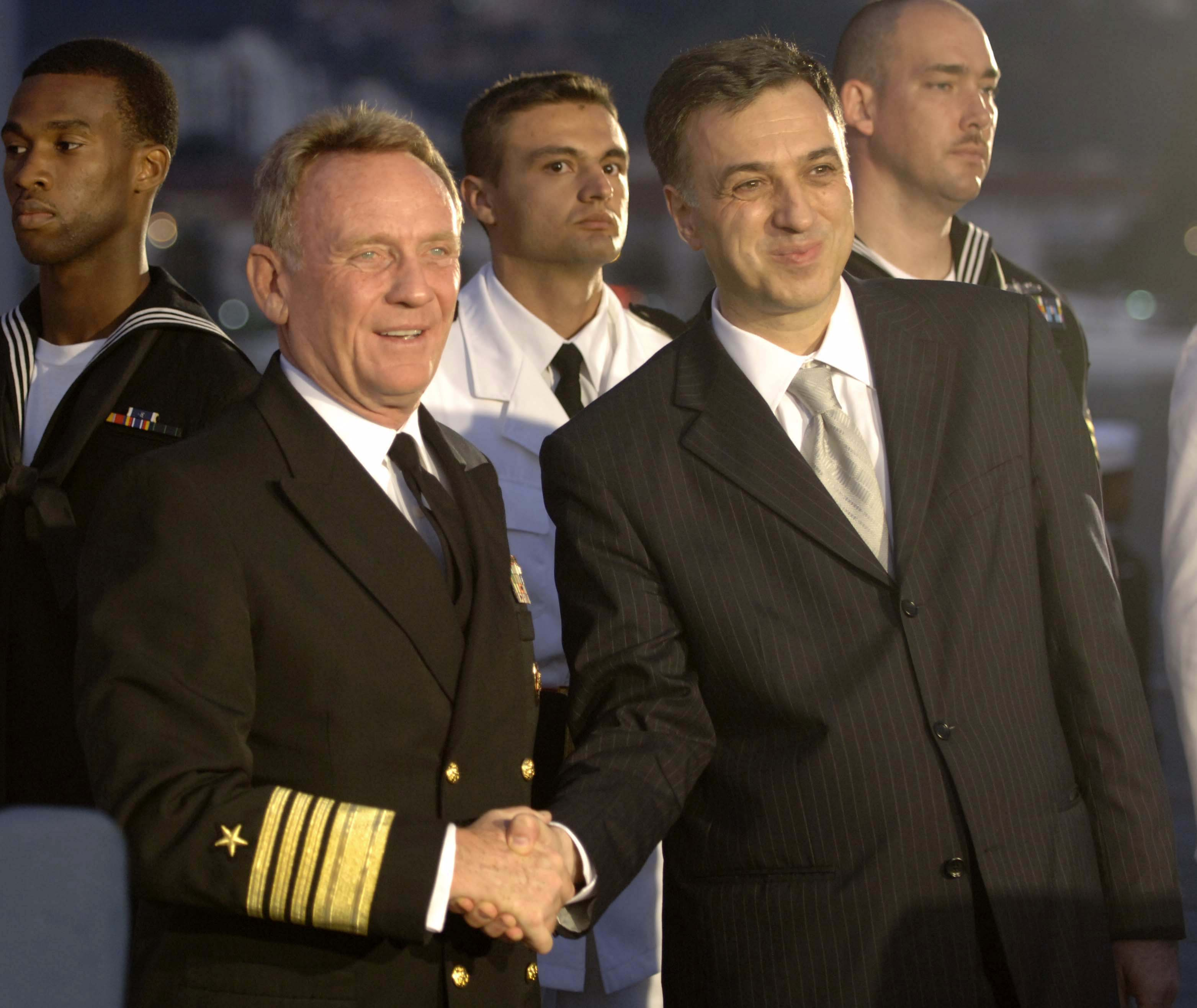
Vujanovic and Commander of U.S. Naval Forces Europe Harry Ulrich aboard USS Anzio in 2006.

On 5 December 2012, Vujanović hosted the 4th Regional Summit of the Heads of States, held in Budva. On 13 June 2013, Vujanović was participating in the 18th Summit of the Heads of States of the Central European Countries, held in Bratislava.

==== Serbia ====
Vujanović, as President of Montenegro, recognized the Independence of Kosovo, a Serbian autonomous province. In October 2008, the Serbian government expelled Anka Vojvodić, the ambassador of Montenegro to Belgrade. Almost one year later, Serbia finally accepted Igor Jovović to take on the role of the new Montenegrin ambassador.

After being elected the new Serbian president in May 2012, Tomislav Nikolić gave an interview to Televizija Crne Gore, during which he stated that he recognizes Montenegro as a state, "but not any difference between Serbs and Montenegrins, because there is none". On 13 June 2013, Vujanović met Nikolić in Bratislava, pointing out that he "supported the activities of the two Governments aimed at joint projects and interests, with a special emphasis on the infrastructural projects".

==== Romania ====
On 24 June 2013, Vujanović received Titus Corlățean, Romanian Minister of Foreign Affairs, who came to Montenegro on the occasion of the Romanian bus crash. He reiterated the deepest condolences in his own name and on behalf of the citizens of Montenegro. He also sent a telegram of condolences to Romania's President, Traian Băsescu, over that accident in which 18 tourists from Romania lost their lives. 26 June, the day when the victims were repatriated, became a day of national mourning in solidarity with Romania.

== Timeline ==
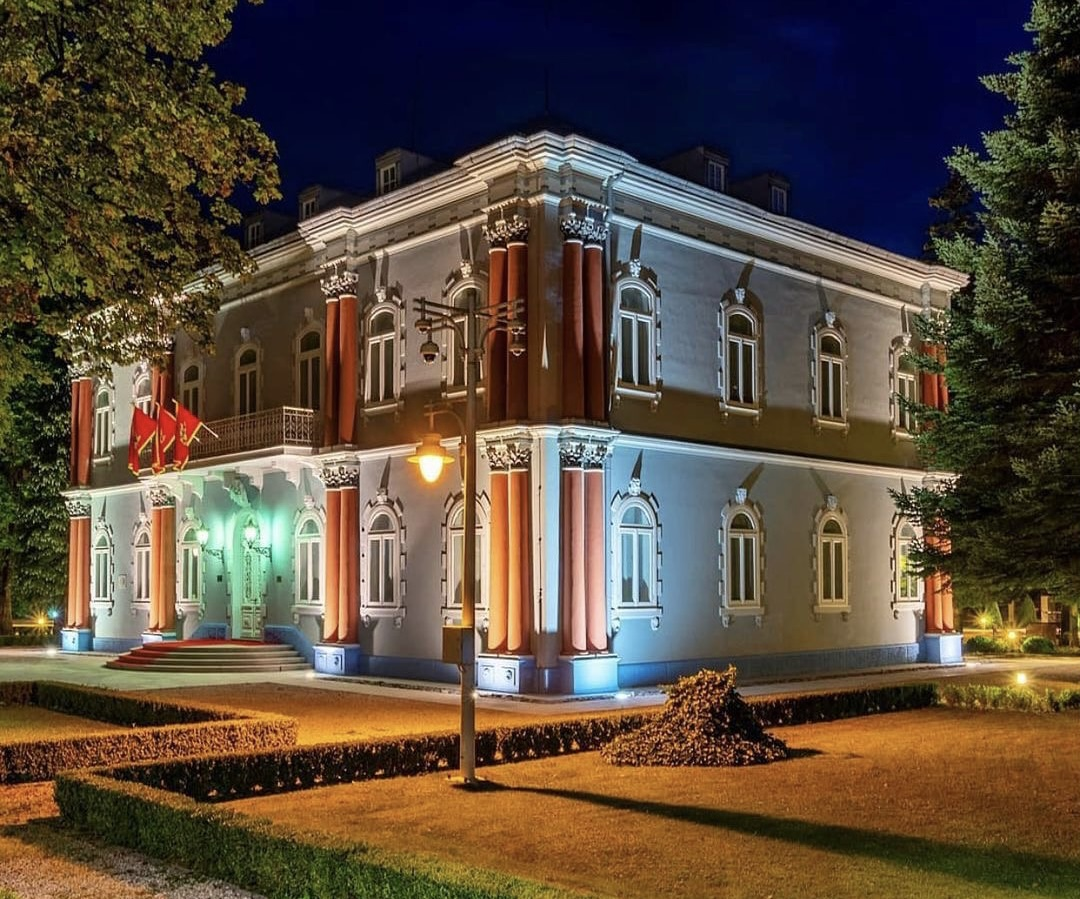
The Blue Palace in Cetinje, the seat of the President of Montenegro

The chart below shows a timeline of the offices held by Vujanović and the Montenegro status. The left bar shows the president and all prime minister's terms of Vujanović, and the right bar shows the country status of Montenegro at that time.

== Personal life ==
Since May 1985, he has been married to Svetlana Vujanović, a court judge, with whom he has three children: two daughters (Tatjana and Nina), and a son (Danilo). Vujanović stands 2.00 m (6 ft 6 1/2 in) in height making him among the tallest statesmen in the world.

== Honours and awards ==
- House of Petrović-Njegoš: Knight Grand Cross of the Order of Prince Danilo I (4 June 2005)
- (Kingdom of the Two Sicilies) House of Bourbon-Two Sicilies: Sovereign Knight Grand Cross of the Royal Order of Francis I (29 July 2012)
- Serbian Orthodox Church: Order of the Holy Emperor Constantine (19 October 2013)
- Bulgaria: Grand Cross of the Order of the Balkan Mountains (25 November 2016)

== Note ==
Political offices
Preceded by Milo Đukanović	Prime Minister of Montenegro; 1998–2002	Succeeded by Dragan Đurović; Acting
Preceded by Milo Đukanović	President of Montenegro; 2002–2003	Succeeded by Rifat Rastoder; Dragan Kujović; Acting
Preceded by Rifat Rastoder; Dragan Kujović; Acting	President of Montenegro; 2003–2018	Succeeded by Milo Đukanović
