= Dragan Kujović =

President of Montenegro (1940–2010)

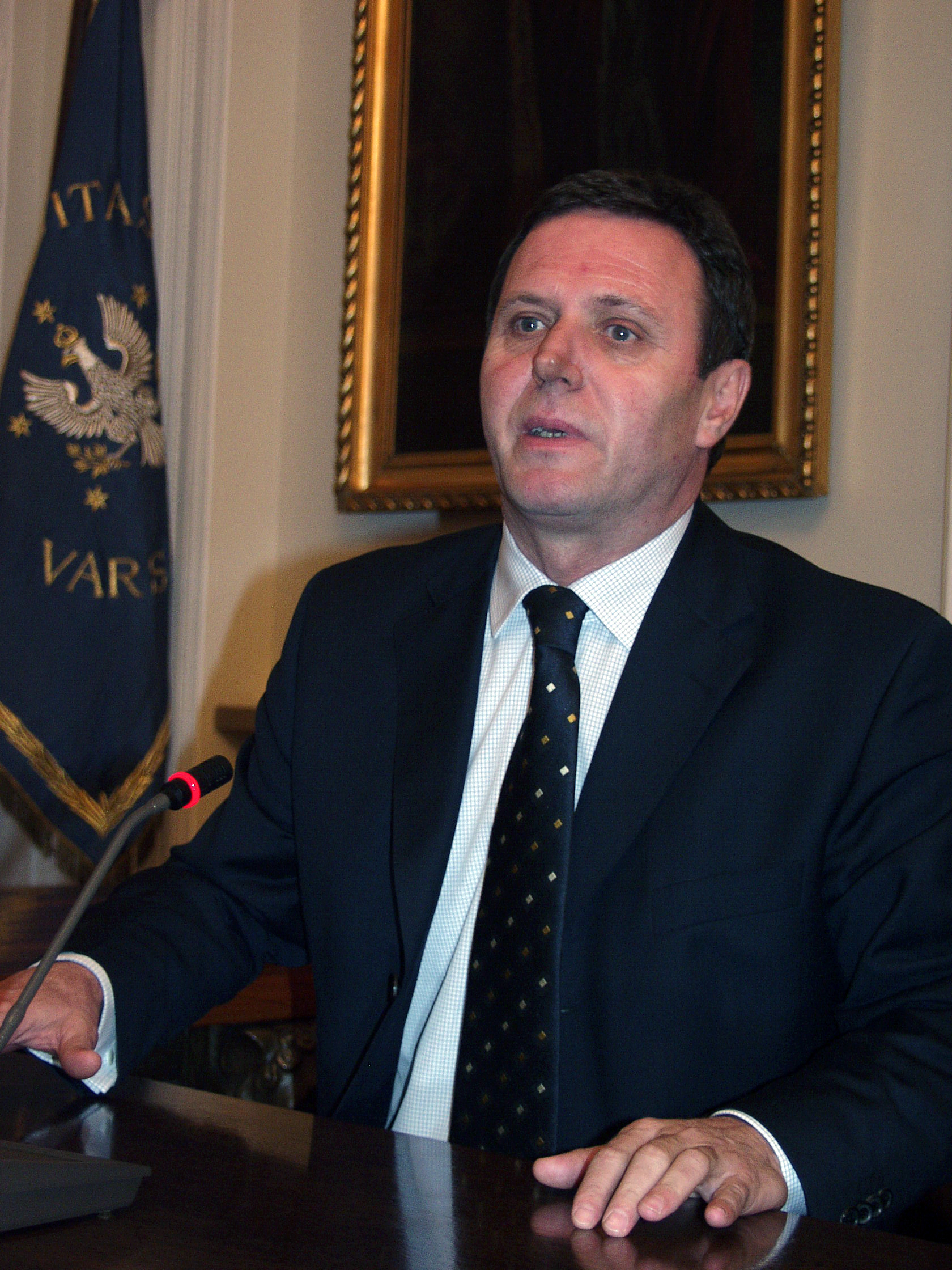
Kujović in 2003

Dragan Kujović (Montenegrin Cyrillic: Драган Кујовић; 1948–2010) was a politician from the Republic of Montenegro and a member of the Democratic Party of Socialists of Montenegro. He served as acting President of Montenegro from 19 to 22 May 2003.

Political offices
Preceded by Filip Vujanović	President of Montenegro; Acting; 2003	Succeeded by Filip Vujanović
