= 2013 Montenegrin presidential election =

Presidential election held in Montenegro

- 7 April 2013
- Registered: 511,405
- Turnout: 63.90% (▼4.30pp)
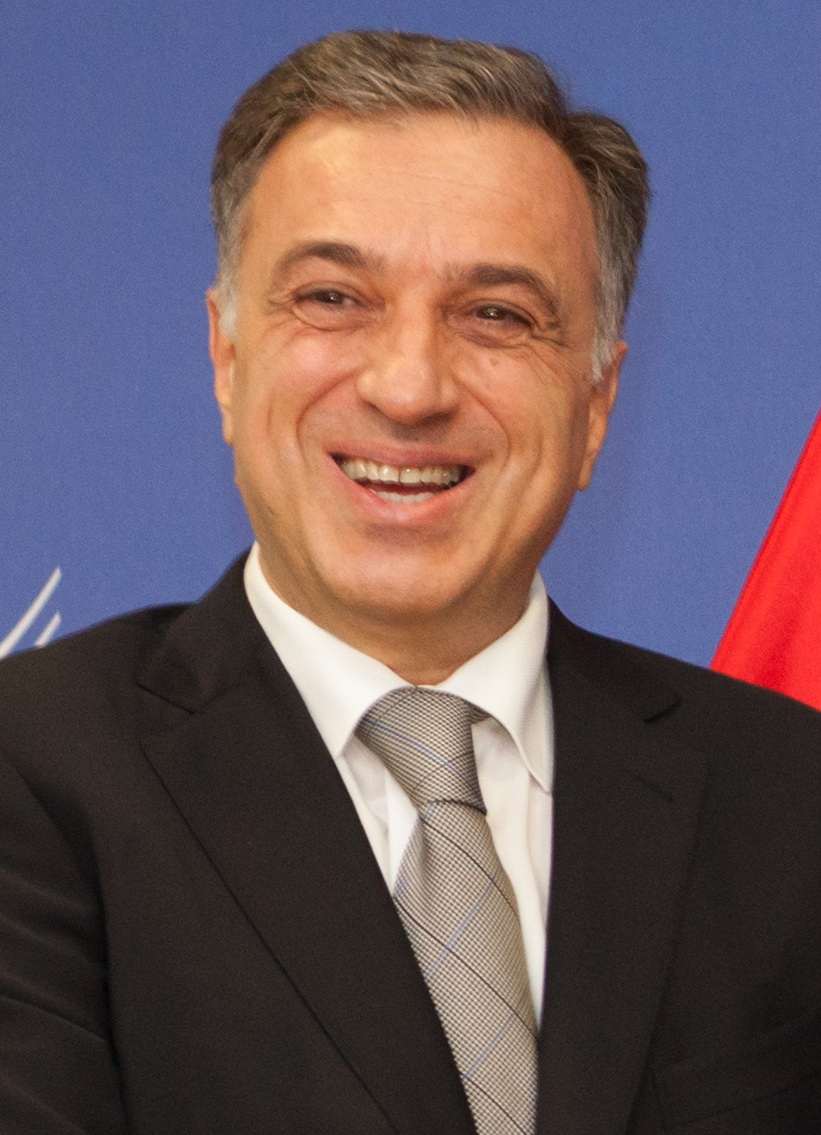

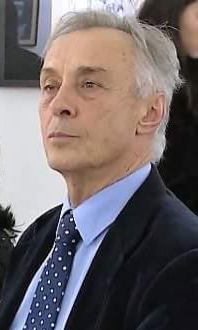
Candidate	Filip Vujanović	Miodrag Lekić
Party	DPS	Independent
Popular vote	161,940	154,289
Percentage	51.21%	48.79%
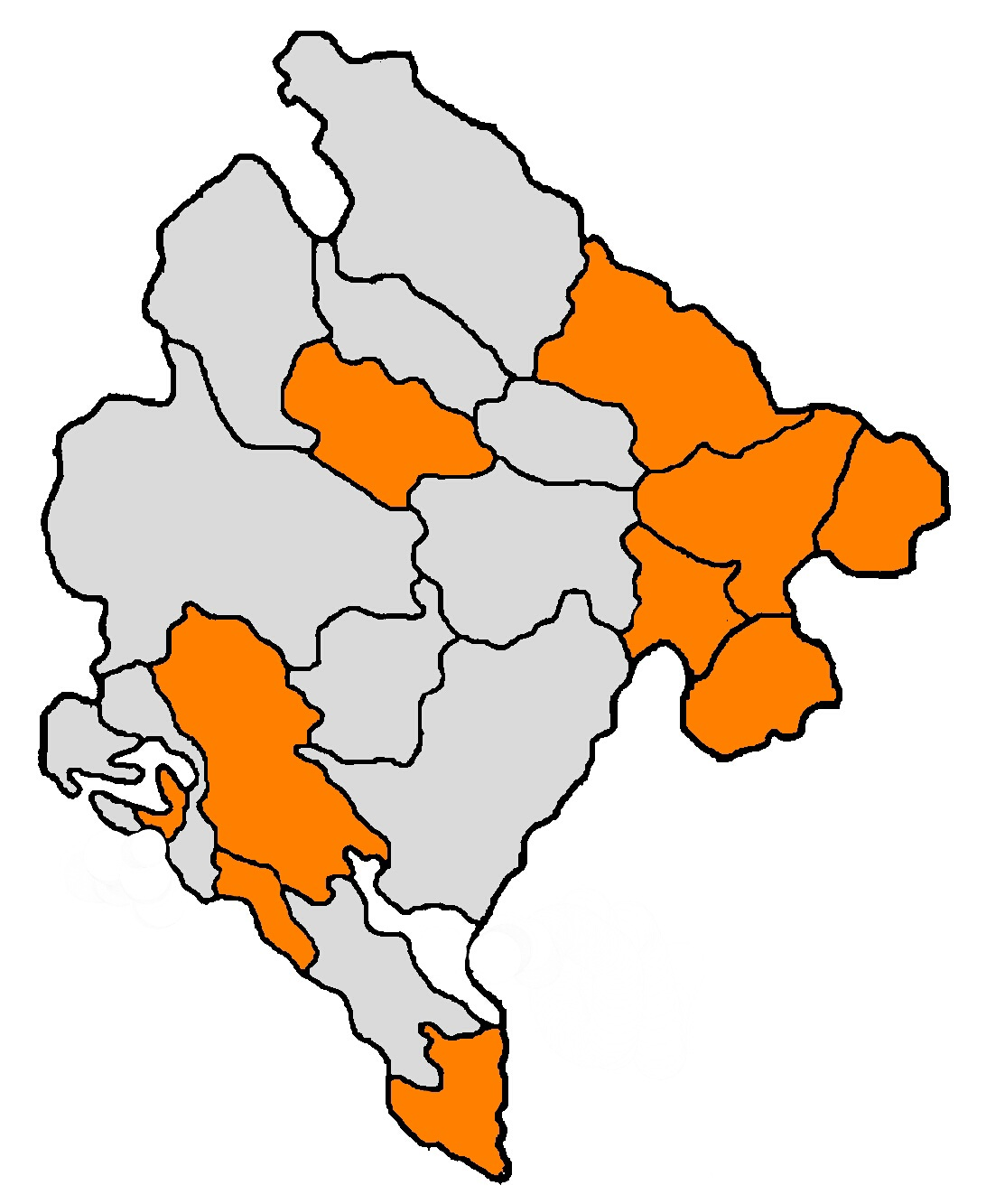
- Results by municipality Vujanović Lekić
President before election
Filip Vujanović
DPS
President after
election
Filip Vujanović
DPS

Presidential elections were held in Montenegro on 7 April 2013. Incumbent President Filip Vujanović of the Democratic Party of Socialists (DPS) was challenged by independent candidate Miodrag Lekić, who was a common candidate endorsed by the opposition.

== Background ==
Vujanović's third candidacy was viewed controversial by many; the Social Democratic Party (SDP), the minor coalition partner of the DPS, threatened to end their coalition if Vujanovic "illegally" ran again and lodged an appeal to the Constitutional Court; SDP's leader Ranko Krivokapić and the Montenegrin president are long-time rivals, mainly due to Vujanović's moderate approaches to the country's national question, while Krivokapić maintains a more hardline nationalist approach.

The opposition shared the ruling Social Democrats' viewpoint that Vujanović running for a third term was unconstitutional, adding that it was one of the representative elements of the DPS' authoritarian reign over Montenegro. Experts expressed opinion that he would perhaps endure the fate of Serbia's former president Boris Tadić, who lost the election running for his third term in 2012. It has also been pointed out that while the 2006 Serbian law enables Tadić to run for the second time because his first mandate, elected while Serbia was not a country but a federal unit, the 2007 Montenegrin law makes no distinction, meaning this would legally be Vujanović's third term, the Montenegrin constitution allows for only two terms in a lifetime.

In February 2013, the Constitutional Court officially approved Vujanović's candidacy, noting that for his 2003–2008 term he was elected as President of Montenegro as a constituent entity within its state union with Serbia and served as de facto independent head of state only in 2006–2008, meaning that his 2008–2013 term is legally his first term.

== Campaign ==
The opposition had decided to unite under a common candidate which would best represent individual differences; the leader of the Democratic Front (DF) opposition alliance that was formed under the basis of Miodrag Lekic as president and ran at the 2012 national elections based on that idea, ran as an independent candidate. He had received strong support immediately from the Socialist People's Party of Montenegro (SNP); the last remaining main opposition party, Positive Montenegro (PCG), originally had planned to present its party leader Darko Pajović as candidate but fell into deep financial problems and decided to endorse Lekic instead, as a common candidate of the opposition.

== Results ==
Prior to the official announcement of the results, both Filip Vujanović and Miodrag Lekić claimed to have won the election. Based on the vote count of the ruling Democratic Party of Socialists of Montenegro, Vujanović claimed to have received 51.3% of the vote, to 48.7% for Lekić. However, the opposition Democratic Front stated that Lekić was the rightful winner of the election with 50.5% of the vote to Vujanović's 49.5%. They likened Vujanovic's victory claim to a "coup d'etat".

On 8 April 2013, Electoral Commission chairman Ivan Kalezić announced that Vujanović had won the election with 51.2% of the vote. Representatives for Lekić's campaign stated that they would not recognise the results and filed a request for a recount in all municipalities.

Candidate	Party	Votes	%
Filip Vujanović	Democratic Party of Socialists	161,940	51.21
Miodrag Lekić	Independent	154,289	48.79
Total		316,229	100.00
Valid votes		316,229	96.76
Invalid/blank votes		10,574	3.24
Total votes		326,803	100.00
Registered voters/turnout		511,405	63.90
Source: Electoral Commission
