= President of Montenegro =

Head of state

- Predśednik Crne Gore; Предс́едник Црне Горе
- Standard of the president of Montenegro

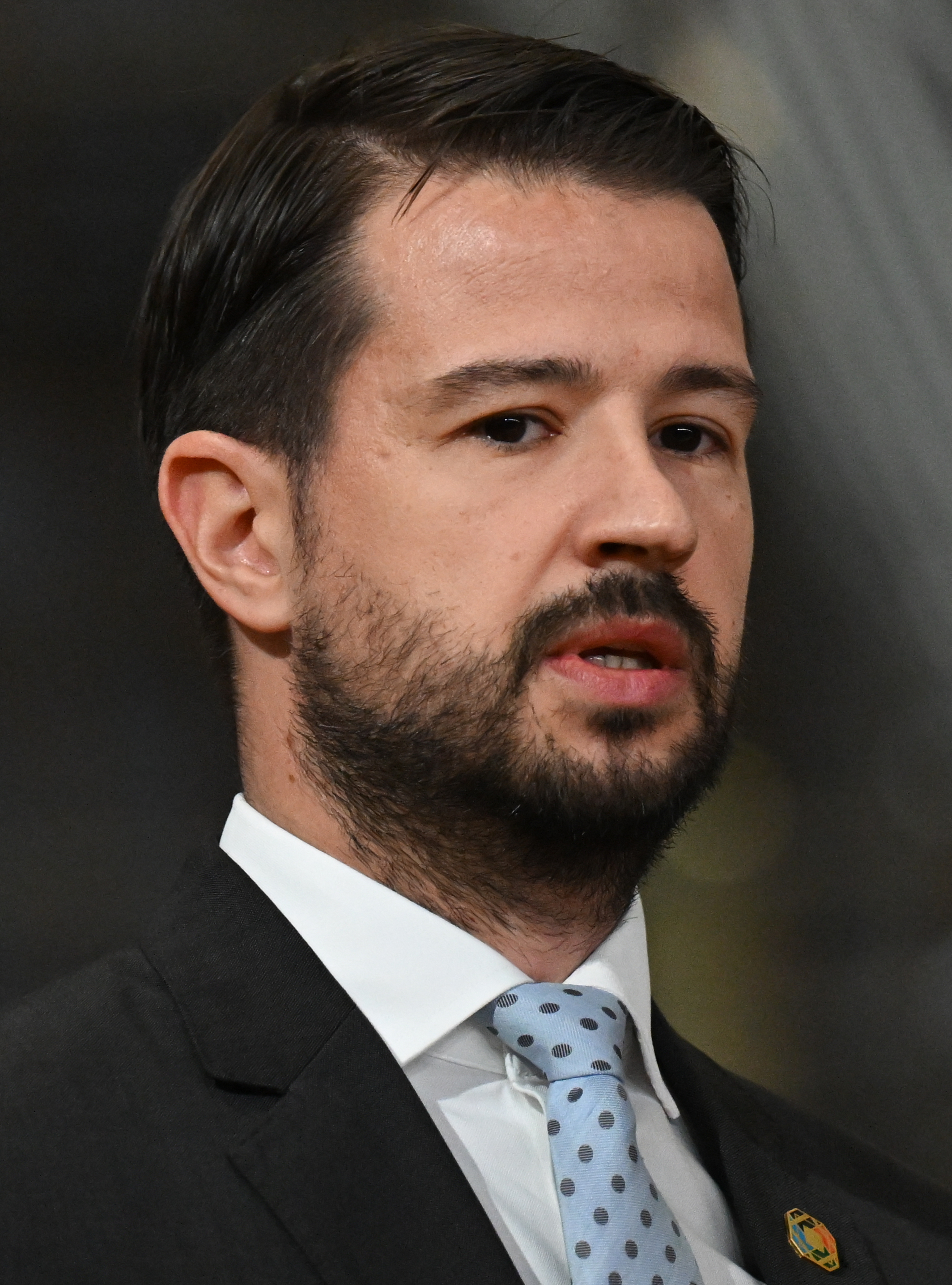
- Incumbent; Jakov Milatović since 20 May 2023
- Presidential Service of Montenegro
- Member of: Defense and Security Council
- Residence: Blue Palace, Cetinje
- Term length: Five years, renewable once
- Constituting instrument: Constitution of Montenegro (2007)
- Inaugural holder: Filip Vujanović
- Formation: 15 November 1943; 82 years ago 3 June 2006; 20 years ago (current from)
- Salary: US$33,440 annually
- Website: www.predsjednik.me

The president of Montenegro (Note: Montenegrin: Predśednik Crne Gore / Предс́едник Црне Горе Serbo-Croatian: Predsjednik Crne Gore / Предсједник Црне Горе) is the head of state of Montenegro. The current president is Jakov Milatović since 20 May 2023. The official residence of the president is the Blue Palace in Cetinje.

The president is constitutionally limited to two five-year terms of office. A candidate must be a citizen of Montenegro and have lived there for at least ten of the prior fifteen years.

== Term ==
According to the Constitution of Montenegro, Article 97:

The President of Montenegro shall be elected for the period of five years.

The same person may be elected the President of Montenegro in two terms.

The President of Montenegro shall assume the duty on the date of taking an oath before the Members of the Parliament.

If the mandate of the President expires during the state of war or the state of emergency, the mandate shall be extended for maximum 90 days after the end of circumstances that have caused that state.

The President of Montenegro shall not perform any other public duty.

== Duties ==
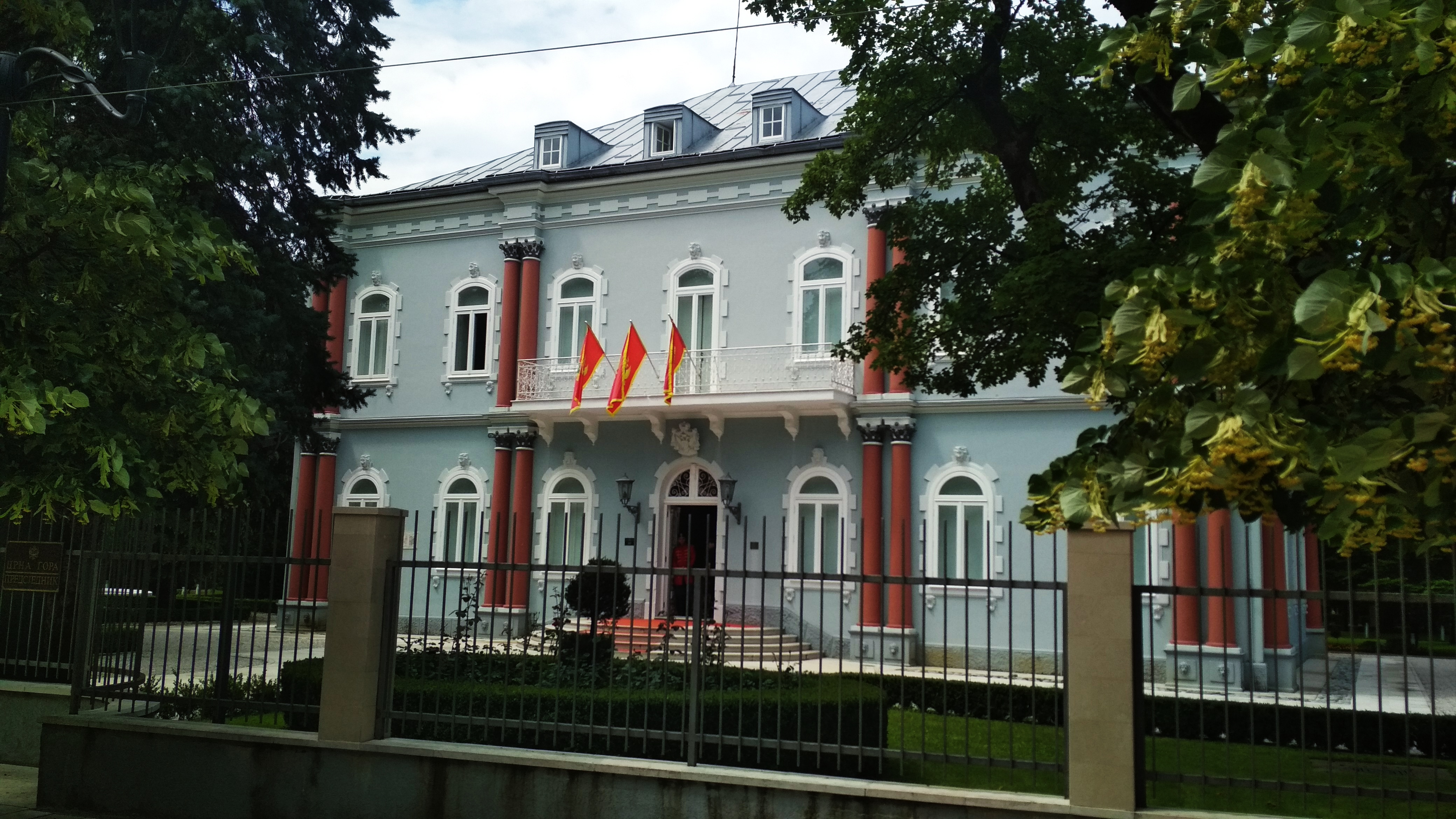
The Blue Palace in Cetinje, the official seat of the President of Montenegro.

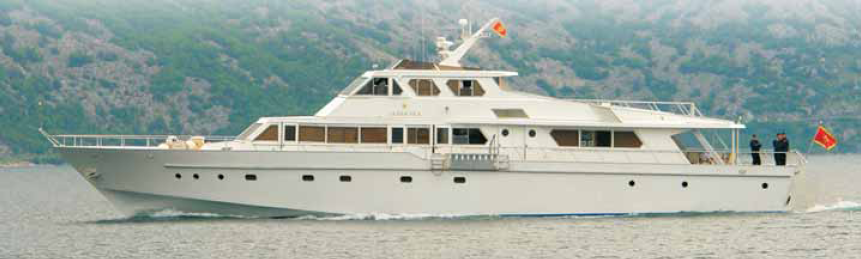
The "Jadranka" presidential yacht

According to the Constitution of Montenegro, Article 95, the president of Montenegro:

1. Represents Montenegro in the country and abroad;
2. Commands over the Army on the basis of the decisions of the Defense and Security Council;
3. Proclaims laws by Ordinance;
4. Calls for the elections for the Parliament;
5. Proposes to the Parliament: candidate for the prime minister, after consultations with the representatives of the political parties represented in the Parliament; president and judges of the Constitutional Court; protector of human rights and liberties;
6. Appoints and revokes ambassadors and heads of other diplomatic missions of Montenegro abroad, at the proposal of the Government and after obtaining the opinion of the Parliamentary Committee responsible for international relations;
7. Accepts letters of accreditation and revocation of the foreign diplomats;
8. Awards medals and honors of Montenegro;
9. Grants amnesty;
10. Performs other tasks stipulated by the Constitution or the law.

=== Performance ===
According to the Constitution of Montenegro, Article 99, in the case of cessation of mandate of the president of Montenegro, until the election of the new president, as well as in the case of temporary impediment of the president to discharge his/her duties, the president of the Parliament of Montenegro shall discharge this duty.

== Promulgation of laws ==
According to the Constitution of Montenegro, Article 94, the president of Montenegro shall proclaim the law within seven days from the day of adoption of the law, that is, within three days if the law has been adopted under a speedy procedure or send the law back to the Parliament for new decision-making process. The President of Montenegro shall proclaim the re-adopted law.

== Latest elections ==
Candidate	Party	First round		Second round	
Candidate	Party	Votes	%	Votes	%
Jakov Milatović	Europe Now!	97,867	28.92	221,592	58.88
Milo Đukanović	Democratic Party of Socialists	119,685	35.37	154,769	41.12
Andrija Mandić	Democratic Front	65,393	19.32		
Aleksa Bečić	Democratic Montenegro	37,562	11.10		
Draginja Vuksanović	Social Democratic Party	10,669	3.15		
Goran Danilović	United Montenegro	4,659	1.38		
Jovan Radulović	Independent	2,574	0.76		
Total		338,409	100.00	376,361	100.00
Valid votes		338,409	97.43	376,361	98.97
Invalid/blank votes		8,924	2.57	3,920	1.03
Total votes		347,333	100.00	380,281	100.00
Registered voters/turnout		542,154	64.07	542,154	70.14
Source: State Electoral Commission, Radio and Television of Montenegro

== Standards ==
Presidential Standard on Land

Presidential Standard Afloat

== See also ==
- List of presidents of Montenegro
- Politics of Montenegro
- Prime Minister of Montenegro
