= Bena =

Bena can refer to:

== People ==
- Bena (surname)
- Banna people, an ethnic group in Ethiopia
- Bena (ethnic group), ethnic group in Tanzania
  - Bena language, language in the Bantu group, spoken by the Bena people of Tanzania
- Bena language (Adamawa), an Adamawa language of Nigeria

== Places ==
- Bena, California, community in Kern County, California, United States
- Bena, Minnesota, city in Cass County, Minnesota, United States
- Bena, Nigeria, a village in Kebbi State, northwestern Nigeria
- Bena, Victoria, Austria, a rural hamlet 100 km south-east of Melbourne

== Other uses ==
- Bena (moth), genus of moth in the family Nolidae
- Bena (grape), grape variety indigenous to Bosnia and Herzegovina
- Diphenhydramine, known by the trade name Bena
- British Naturalists' Association, formerly known as the British Empire Naturalists' Association (BENA)
