= Stamatović =

Stamatović (Serbian Cyrillic: Стаматовић) is a Serbian surname, derived from the male given name Stamat, itself derived from Greek name Stamatis meaning "stopper" (stamata means "to stop"). It may refer to:

- Stanoje Glavaš (1763–1815), Serbian revolutionary
- Aleksandar Stamatović (born 1967), Montenegrin historian
- Uroš Stamatović (born 1976), retired Serbian footballer

== See also ==
- Stamatopoulos, Greek surname
- Stamatov, Bulgarian surname
