= Stamatov =

Stamatov (Bulgarian: Стаматов) is a Bulgarian surname, derived from the male given name Stamat, itself derived from Greek name Stamatis meaning "stopper" (stamata means "to stop"). It may refer to:

- Georgi Stamatov (1893–1965), Bulgarian actor and director.
- Georgi Porfiriev Stamatov (1869–1942), Bulgarian writer.
- Varban Stamatov (1924–1998), Bulgarian writer, marine novelist, publicist and editor.

== See also ==
- Stamatopoulos, Greek surname
- Stamatović, Serbian surname
