= Benas =

Benas may refer to the following notable people:

Given name

- Benas Šatkus (born 2001), Lithuanian footballer
- Benas Veikalas, Lithuanian basketball player

Surname

- Fuzzy Benas, American artistic gymnast
- Stamatis Benas (born 1985), Greek basketball player

== See also ==
- Benasque, a town in the comarca of Ribagorza, province of Huesca, Spain
- Bena (surname)
