= Mohammed Suleiman Ambursa =

Chief Judge of Kebbi State, Nigeria

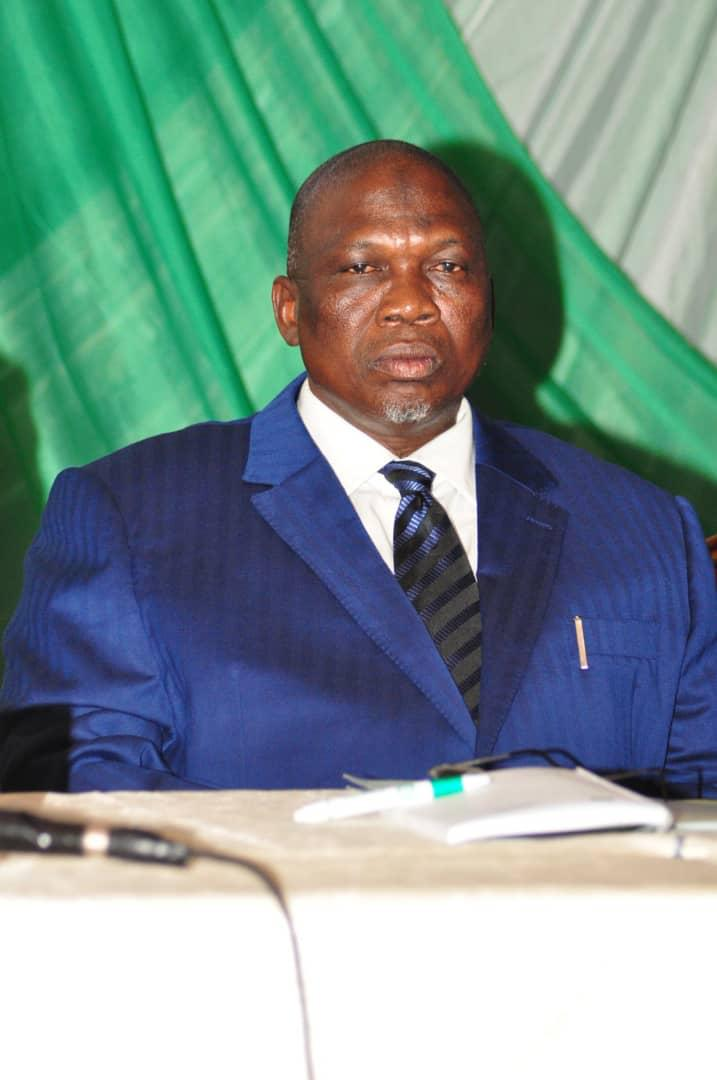

Chief Judge of Kebbi State
- Incumbent
- Assumed office 16 January 2020
- Appointed by: Abubakar Atiku Bagudu
- Preceded by: Karatu Asabe

Personal details
- Born: 25 December 1957 (age 68) Birnin Kebbi, Nigeria
- Education: Usmanu Danfodiyo University
- Occupation: Jurist; lawyer

Mohammed Suleiman Ambursa (born 25 December 1957) is a Nigerian jurist who is the Chief Judge of Kebbi State. He hails from Ambursa, Birnin Kebbi Local Government Area of Kebbi.

== Education ==
Justice Ambursa began his primary education in the year 1963 at the town's public primary school Ambursa where he acquired his Primary School Leaving Certificate in the year 1969 and then proceeded Government Secondary School Yawa-Yauri. where he earned his Senior School Leaving Certificate from 1970 to 1974.

While waiting to attend the College of Education he worked at Manfolo Primary School as a teacher from 1974 to 1975. While a student at the college of Education; his desire to impart knowledge fueled him to teach at Government College Sokoto and Teachers college D/Daj in 1977 and 1978 respectively. After earning his certificate from the College of Education, Sokoto, he taught at Ifon-Erin Community High School, Ifon Osun State between 1979-1980 and Kanta College Argungu in 1980- 1981. In the year 1981 before proceeding to the University of Sokoto for his LLB degree.

For his tertiary education, he attended the Sokoto State College (Now Shehu Shagari College of Education) from 1976 to 1999 and was awarded a National Certificate in Education.

He applied to the Usmanu Danfodio University Sokoto in 1981 and was offered admission to study law. In 1985 he was awarded a degree in law, graduating as the overall best graduating student in the Department of Law. He proceeded to the Nigerian Law School, Lagos and was called to the Nigerian Bar on 16 October 1986 as Barrister and Solicitor, Supreme Court of the Federal Republic of Nigeria.

== Judicial career ==
In 1986 he started practicing as a Barrister and Solicitor. He first started out as a state Counsel, Ministry of Justice Sokoto State. He served in that capacity for two years until he was appointed as Magistrate 1 in 1988 also Magistrate, Birnin Kebbi and Jega up until 1990. He served as Chief Magistrate in Jega and Birnin Kebbi from 1990 to 1992. He was later appointed as Secretary in the Judicial Service Commission, Kebbi state from 1992 to 1997 and rose to the office of Chief Registrar and served in the High Court of Justice, Birnin Kebbi for a year before emerging as a High Court Judge on 16 April 1998 and has worked in Kebbi state since.

Aside from graduating as the overall best student in Law at the University of Sokoto class of '85; he was also the best graduating student in Islamic Law and the best graduating student in Commercial Law. He was appointed to be prefect during his Primary and Secondary School days. Later he held notable offices. He was onetime the Acting Director of Public Prosecution, Ministry of Justice in Birnin Kebbi from 1987 – 1988.

Other positions held by him include Counsel to Zuru Religious Disturbances Judicial Commission of inquiry (1988), Member the Revenue Drive Committee Kebbi State (1993), Chairman in Local Government Election Petitions Tribunal Kebbi State (1997) Chairman Contract Review Panel in Kebbi State (1999), Chairman Commission of inquiry into Crisis Between members of NURTW and the Nigerian Police in Koko (2004)

== Election Petition Tribunal Cases ==
He also held the position of the member, to Local Government Election Petition Tribunal Edo state in 1999 and Member of Legislative Houses and Governorship Election Petition Tribunal of Osun state in the same (1999).

In August 2003 he served as a member of the Legislature Houses and Governorship Elections Petition Tribunal, Rivers State. Then in January of 2nd, he was a member in the Legislature House and Governorship Elections Petition Tribunal, Nassarawa State, then in April 2004 he was a member to the Legislative House and Governorship Election Petition Tribunal of Benue State; in July 2004 he also served as a member in the Legislative House and Governorship Elections Petition Tribunal of Anambra State and also for Kogi State in October 2004; in the same year, he served as a member for Enugu State Legislative Houses and Governorship Election Petition Tribunal.

In April 2005, he was a member of the Delta State Tribunal and in August 2006 he was a member of the Ekiti State Tribunal. In May 2007, he was a member of the Jigawa State Tribunal. He held the position of the chairman for the Governorship and Legislative Houses Election Petition Tribunal in Osun State, Ogun State, and Edo State in 2009

He also was the Chairman for the Plateau State Tribunal in April 2011 and the Kogi State Gubernatorial Election Tribunal in December 2011 and then in July 2012 for Edo State Tribunal. He also served as the chairman of the Governorship Election Petition Tribunal for Rivers State in 2015.

He also held other positions like the PTA chairman for Moh'd Suleiman Model Primary School Ambursa from 1998 to 2006, he currently serves as the PTA Chairman for Government Girls College Birnin Kebbi; a position he has held since 1997.

Upon his confirmation by Kebbi State House of Assembly on 10 January 2020; Gov. Atiku Bagudu of Kebbi, sworn in Justice Suleiman Ambursa as substantive Chief Judge of the State on 16 January 2020. Prior to his appointment, he acted as the Acting Chief Judge of the State after the retirement of the former Chief Judge: Hon. Justice Karatu Asabe.

Since assuming office as the Chief Judge of the State, he has made the speedy dispensation of Justice and prison decongestion two of his key priorities on judicial reform in the state. Honorable Justice Suleiman Mohammed Ambursa is married with children.
