= Uhu =

Uhu or UHU may refer to:

== World War II ==
- Heinkel He 219, a German night interceptor aircraft
- Focke-Wulf Fw 189 Uhu, a German tactical reconnaissance aircraft
- An infrared searchlight-equipped 1944 variant of the Sd.Kfz. 251, a German armored personnel carrier

== UHU ==
- UHU, a German manufacturer of adhesives
- UHU (magazine), a 1924–1934 German monthly
- United Hockey Union, a group of ice hockey leagues in North America
- United Hatters of North America, a defunct labor union

== Other uses ==
- Uhu, the symbol for the chemical element Unhexunium
- Uhu (playing card), a trump card in a Tarock deck
- another name for the Eurasian eagle-owl
- Uhu, villages in Nigeria:
  - see List of villages in Anambra State
  - see List of villages in Kebbi State
