= Stamatopoulos =

Stamatopoulos (Greek: Σταματόπουλος, "son of Stamatis (Σταμάτης), Stamatos (Σταμάτος) (variants of the formal) Stamatios (Σταμάτιος)") is a Greek surname with the feminine form being Stamatopoulou (Σταματοπούλου). It is the patronymic surname of:

- Adamantia Stamatopoulou ("Mando") (born 1966), Greek singer
- Alexandra Stamatopoulou (born 1986), Greek Paralympic swimmer
- Dino Stamatopoulos (born 1964), Greek-American television writer and producer
- Efstratios Stamatopoulos, the true name of the Greek writer Stratis Myrivilis (1890–1969)
- Kyriakos Stamatopoulos (born 1979), Greek-Canadian football goalkeeper
- Maria Stamatopoulou, Greek archaeologist

== See also ==
- John Stamos, American musician and actor whose surname is an abbreviation of Stamatopoulos
