= Stamatakis =

Stamatakis (Greek: Σταματάκης) is a Greek diminutive surname. Notable people with the surname include:

- Giannis Stamatakis (born 1994), Greek footballer
- Panagiotis Stamatakis (c. 1835–1885), Greek archaeologist
