= Bena, California =

Unincorporated community in California, United States

Bena
- Unincorporated area
- Location in California Bena (the United States)
- Coordinates: 35°19′36″N 118°44′23″W
- Country: United States
- State: California
- County: Kern
- Elevation: 863 ft (263 m)

Bena (formerly Pampa) is an unincorporated area of Kern County, California, United States. It is located on the Union Pacific Railroad, 7 miles (11 km) west-northwest of Caliente, at an elevation of 863 feet (263 m). The Pampa post office operated from 1889 to 1890 and again during 1901.

== Railroad history ==
The Bena railroad station was built in 1885. In 1918, Standard Construction agreed to build four rail operators' houses near Bena for Southern Pacific. In 1962, the old Bena railroad station became the site of the largest superphosphate manufacturing plant west of the Mississippi River.

The Southern Pacific and Santa Fe Railroads donated the old Bena depot, once located a few miles from the Tehachapi Loop, to Kern Pioneer Village in 1961. Bena Depot was fully restored by the Kern County Museum in 2020.

== Oil fields and landfill ==
The area near Bena was the site of wildcat drilling for oil in the 1930s and 1940s.

Kern County now operates a landfill at Bena.
