= Bena (surname) =

Bena is the surname of the following notable people:

- David Bena (born 1943), American Anglican bishop
- Dimitris Bena (born 1996), Greek football player
- Philippe Bena (1952–2012), French fencer
- Quentin Bena (born 1998), French football player
- Stevan Bena (1935–2012), Serbian football player
