= Dimitris Bena =

Greek footballer

Dimitris Mpena
Personal information
- Full name: Dimitrios Mpena
- Date of birth: 9 July 1996 (age 30)
- Place of birth: Zverneci, Albania
- Height: 1.90 m (6 ft 3 in)
- Position: Centre back

Team information
- Current team: Ethnikos Piraeus

Youth career
- Ethnikos Piraeus

Senior career*
Years	Team	Apps	(Gls)
2012–	Ethnikos Piraeus	57	(6)
- * Club domestic league appearances and goals

Dimitris Mpena (Greek: Δημήτρης Μπένα; born 9 July 1996) is a Greek footballer, who currently plays for Ethnikos Piraeus in the Football League 2 as a centre back. He broke through the first team in 2012 and learned a lot under the guidance of Giorgos Syros.
