= Stamatis =

Stamatis (Greek: Σταμάτης) is a given name and surname of Greek origin, a hypocoristic (a pet name or calling form) of Stamatios (Σταμάτιος). See also the derived diminutive Stamatakis (Σταματάκης). Notable people with the name Stamatis include:

== Given name ==
- Stamatis Benas (born 1985), Greek basketball player
- Stamatis Kalamiotis (born 1990), Greek footballer
- Stamatis Kokotas (1937–2022), Greek folk singer
- Stamatis Kraounakis (born 1955), Greek music composer, producer, lyricist, writer and director
- Stamatis Krestenitis (d. 1823), Greek revolutionary leader
- Stamatis Poulis, Greek politician
- Stamatis Sapalidis (born 1990), Greek professional footballer
- Stamatis Spanoudakis (born 1948), Greek classical composer
- Stamatis Voulgaris (1779–1842), Greek urban planner

== Surname ==
- Alexis Stamatis (born 1960), Greek novelist, playwright and poet
- Andreas Stamatis (born 1993), Greek footballer
- Dimitrios Stamatis (born 1996), Greek basketball player
- Giorgos Stamatis (born 1975), Greek politician
- Jim Stamatis (born 1958), retired American soccer forward
