= List of villages in Kebbi State =

This is a list of villages and settlements in Kebbi State, Nigeria organised by local government area (LGA) and district/area (with postal codes also given).

== By postal code ==
LGA	District / Area	Postal code	Villages
Aleiro	Alero	863102	Alero; Dangaladima; Jiga Birni; Jiga Makera; Magajin Gari; R/Banwa; S/Fada; Tudun Wada
Aleiro	Sabiyel	863104	D/ Galadima; Dakala; Gumbulu; Kashin Zama Farafa; Kashin Zama-; Nasarawa; R/ Bauna; Sabiyel; U/ Galadima
Arewa Dandi	kangiwa	861106	Amagwato; Baraje Buii; Chibike; Falde; Fasko; G/Dikko; Gumundai; Gunki; Kangiwa; Muza Jaffeji; Rafin Taska
Arewa Dandi	Yeldu	861107	Bachaka; Danstohuwa; Dantsoho; Daura; Jantullu; Jarkuka; Laima; Sakwaba; Sarka; Yeldu
Argungu	Argungu (Rural)	861101	Alwasa; Bachaye; Bela; Dabiri; Filinde; Gottomo; Gulma; Jada; Kadubba; Marafa; T/ Maidawa; T/ Marina; Tasumbulai; Ummara; Unwara
Argungu	Gulma	861102	Babgola; Birnin Lafiya; Gulma; Kaura; Sawwa; T/ Rairai
Argungu	Lailaba	861103	Baguni; Dagini; Danba; Fakkai; Galbi; Ladafando; Lailaba; Leni; Natsini; Rumbuki; Sakawa; Sarkin Gobir; T/ Zazzagawa; Yamama; Yarkatanga; Zazzagawa
Augie	Augie	861104	Augie; Bagaye; Dundaye; IIIela Rafi; Kwaido; Mera; Yola; Zagi
Augie	Bayawa	861105	Awade; B/Tude; Bayawa; Bubuce; Gudale; Tiggi
Bagudo	Bagudo	871101	Bagudo; Bahindi; Bokki(Doma); Geza; Gumi; Gyalange; Illelar-Awwal; Kaliel; Kudi; Maraka; Marake; Matsinkai; Rafin Gari; Sharabi; Tuga; Ubandawaki-Gummi
Bagudo	Illo	871103	Bani; Gatswani; Gesharo; Giris; IIIo; Kali; Kasati; Kurkuru; Lolo; Sabon Gari; Tsamiya; Tundi; Yantela
Bagudo	Kaoje	871102	Bakin Ruwa; G/Fadama; Gandome; Ganten Tudu; Gwamba; Kaoje; Lafagu Grande; Yemusa
Bagudo	Zagga	871104	Kende; Kumbobo; Kurgu; Kwarguwai; Kwasara; Maidanenni; Maitambari; S/Gari; Zagda Gari; Zagga
Birnin Kebbi	Birnin Kebbi	860101	Ambursa; Bago; Busawa; Dagere; Damana; Gandewu; Garu Guri; Gawassu; Gazon fulani; Gazon Zabarmawa; Goru; Gulumbe; Gwadangaji; Hammari; Harasawa; Janzomo; Junju; Kabawa; Kardi Gabas; Kardi Tsakiya; Kardi Yamma; Karyo; Kawara; Lagga; Makera; Nufawa; Randali; Tarasa; U/ Maifada; Ujariyo; Yamma
Bunza	Bunza	862101	Bunza; Dangaladima; Gwade
Bunza	Raha	862102	Maidahini; Matseri; Modomawa; Raha; Sabon Birni; T/Dannufe
Bunza	Zogirma	862103	Salawai; Tilli; Zogirma
Dandi	Kamba	862105	Bani-zumbu; Buma; Dole Kaina; Fana; Fingilla; Geza; Kwakwaba; Kyengakwai; Maidaji; Maigwaza; Rundu Bussa; Shiko; Tungage; Tungar Rogo
Danko-Wasagu	Danko	872104	Danko; Gwanfi; Kele; Kendu; Kyabu; Landi; Marafa; Shindi; T/Maga; Yelmo
Danko-Wasagu	Wasagu	872103	Ayu; Bagida; Bena; D/ Kibiya; D/ Umaru; Dutsen Kwana; Gwazawa; Kango; Kanya; Machika; Morai; Rade; Rambo; Riba Susu; Shengel; Susu; Unashi; Wadako; Waje; Wasagu; Yar Ali; Yarkuka; Zuttu
Fakai	Fakai	872102	B/Tudu; Bajida; Bangu; Bullu; D/Manddanau; Darmi; Garin Awwal; Garin Isa; Gelle; Gulbin Kuka; Inga; Kangi; Kelle; Magaji Fakai; Mahuta; Makera; Marafa; Matseri; Penin Gaba; Rini; S/ Gari/ Yargede; Yarkofoji; Yelwa; Zussun
Gwandu	Dalijan	860103	Amore; Bundusule; Dalijan; Danjema; Gwabbare; Gwanyel; Warari
Gwandu	Gwandu	860102	Gora; Gumbai; Gyartau; Jariyaje; Karangiyar Sarki; Kurya; Kwazari; Kwazgara; Magama; Malisa; Marafa; Maruda; Naman Goma; Rimaye; Ruggar Dawa; Rumbuki; S/Fana; Sabon Birni; Sesseda; Tufara; Yalango
Gwandu	Kambaza	860104	Bada; Dodoru Kambaza; Gamdatobe; Gitta; Gulmere; Illelar Madadi; Madadi; Takari; Tari; Yole Magorama; Yolen Birni
Jega	Jega	863101	Akalawa; Basaura; Dangamaji; Dumbegu; Firchin; Gindi; Illela; Jega Magaji; Kokani; Kyarmi; Maza Goma; Nassarawa; S/Yaki (T/Wada); Sarkin Fada; U/Kuka; Uban Doma
Jega	Kimba	863102	Agwada; Alelu; Birnin Mallam; Fagada; Gehuru; Geza; Jadadi; Jan Dutsi; Katanga; Kimba
Kalgo	Kalgo	862104	Badariya; Danaganna; Dangoma; Diggi; Etene; Gangare; Gayi; Hirishi; Kalgo; Keta Fulani; Keta Hausawa; Magarza; Mutubore; T/Wada; Wuro Gauri
Kalgo	Kuka	862105	Danyaku; Galaru; Kokani; Kuka; Kutu Kullu; Nayalwa; Unguwar Rafi
Koko/Besse	Koko	871105	Amiru; Bakoshi; Besse; BESSE 871106; Dada; Dulmeru; Dutsin Mari; Hirini; K/Damba; Kalakala; Koko; Lani; M/ Marukka; Shebba; Shiyar Magaji; Takware; Zaria
Maiyama	Maiyama	863103	Aida; Andarai; Botoro Gadi; Danwa; Dogon Daji; Gamjeji; Gidiga; Giwatazo; Gumbin Kure; Karaye; Kawara; Kuberi; Kuka Kogo; Kurun Kudu; Kyasuwa; Liba; Maiyama; Mayalo; Mungadi Birni; Ruwan Fili; Sabon Sara; Sambawa; Saradosa; T/ Mamman; Unguwar Kurya; Y/ Kamba; Zara Birni; Zugun Liba
Ngaski	Birnin Yauri	870103	B/Yauri; G/ Baka; Kambuwa; Kimo; Makirim: Marraban Bin yauri
Ngaski	Ngaski	870104	Chipanini; G/ Kwano; G/ Tagware; Kwanga; Libata; Macufa; Ngaski; Utono; Wara
Sakaba	Sakaba	872105	Adai; Bili; D/ Kolo; Dankan- Kambari; Dirin Daji; Dirin Gari; Dokan Hausawa; Gelwasa; Jan Binni; Jan Dutsi; Jigawa; K/ Hodo; Kaiwar Kasa; Kaiwar Sama; Magami; Mahuta; Makuku; Niger; Sakaba; Tunga Gwamna
Shanga	Kwanji	870105	Binuwa; Bukunji; Gebbe; Kawara; Kwanji; Samanaji; Sarge; Turgu
Shanga	Shanga	870106	Dugu Tsolo; Golongo; Hundeji; Rafin Kirya; Sakace; Sawashi; Shanga; Tabki Tara; Takware
Suru	Bakuwai	862108	Daniya; Ginga; Gwafadi; Hore; Kainiki; Kaji; Kawara; Kwakware; Maikari; Nagwade; Sangelu; Shema; Suru; Takalafiya; Tanikwara; Yarma
Suru	Dakin Gari	862106	Aljannare; Bandan; Barbarajo; Bendu; D/Sari; Fanasabo; T/ Alhaji; T/ Mummuni; Tindifai; Zakkuwa
Suru	Giro	862107	Dandawa; G/Taure; Giro; Kwaifa; Matankari
Yauri	Gungun	870102	Baha; Chulu; Gungun; Jigima; Kyauru; Ruwan Dorowa; Tondi; Yabo; Zamare
Yauri	Yelwa	870101	R/ Kuka; T/ Maikaho; Tungar Bindiga
Zuru	Bedi	872104	Bedi; Domo; Dongo; Koga; Maraban Dako; Sanforo (Filin-Jirgi); Unguwan Gara; Unguwan Joji; Unguwan Kate Ubandawaki; Unguwan Kwanchi Manga; Unguwan Rimi; Unguwan Zuttu; Unguwar Bagna; Unguwar Kobo
Zuru	Dabai	872101	Banto Wuya; Barshi Gademe; Bijizo; Chiroma; D'Benzo; D'oh; Dabai; Dabai Same; Dago; Damba; Gamji; Gangara; Garbadu; Gatawa; Gogadi; Gommawa; Gwaram; Isgogo; Jangebe; Kagara; Kahe; Kalgo; Kezge; Klanko; Kseva; Kurawa; Kwendo; Lajinga; Makuwana; Manga; Marai; Matsgi; Msune; Rumu; Ruwan Bore; Ruwan Gizo; Ruwan Gora; Sabon Birni; Sabon Garin Dabai; Seam-Saune; Senchi; Sh/Galadima; Sh/Kayaya; Tara; Ukau; Ung. Lalle; Ushe; Zom-Zomo
Zuru	Isgogo/Dago	872106	Dago Gari; Dago Karkari; Idgobo; Jambo; Jondo Tuta; Kdumti; Komi Semna; Riatu; Semchlali; Semgongo; Tota; Uhu; Unguwan Galadima; Utmu; Wheleta; Yadi; Zangina
Zuru	Manga Ushe	872105	Adkwnh; Ahdgoga; Domo Garu; Dongo Manga; Dorowa; Elembelu; Ghazi; Knata; Kogo; Ma-essah; Madugwa; Mogoro; Rio; Sembren Manga; Udun Kudu; Unguwan Raku; Unguwan S/Usara; Unguwan S/Ushe; Usi; WH-Kwebe
Zuru	Rafin Zuru	872103	Bakin Kasuwa; Denkre; Doga; Hedengen; Jarkasa; K'bancho; Passo; Rimi; Sarku; Semch Loli; Somdoro; Tashar Rimi
Zuru	Rikoto	872107	Bakin Tsauni; Galadima; Mangori; Rikoto Fada; Sabon Garin Rikoto; Sabon Tasha; Tudun Wada; Unguwan Doro; Unguwan Galadima; Unguwan Henso; Unguwan Nagoro; Unguwan Yan Biyu

== By electoral ward ==
Below is a list of polling units, including villages and schools, organised by electoral ward.

LGA	Ward	Polling Unit Name
Aliero	Aliero Dangaladima I	Open Space Opposite Market Barebari (Barebari); Open Space Opposite Market Filin Ango (Filin Ango); Open Space Opposite Mdg Filin Jangi (Filin Jangi); Open Space Opposite Dankatsina Road (Kaurar Dutse I); Open Space Opposite Ibr. Abba Road (Lemi); Open Space Dankatsi Road (Kaurar Dutse II)
Aliero	Aliero Dangaladima II	Model Primary School Gumbin Dari (Gumbin Dari); Open Space Opposite Mosque Ganda Samu (Ganda Samu); Model Primary School Gomozon Alerawa (Gomozon Alerawa); Model Primary School Kali (Kali); Model Primary School Sadam Maijega (Sadam Maijega); Model Primary School Sadam Sanda (Sadam Sanda)
Aliero	Aliero S/Fada I	Open Space Opposite Mosque Filin Bai (Filin Bai); Open Space Adada Road Marina I (Marina I); Court Premises Marina II (Marina II); Traditional Autophedic Hospital Shaya (Shaya ); Attahiru Model Primary School Sabon Gari (Sabon Gari); Open Space Opposite Police Station Tudun Wada (Tudun Wada)
Aliero	Aliero S/Fada II	Open Space Opposite Borehole Dorawai (Dorawai); Model Primary School Gumbulu (Gumbulu); Model Primary School Gumbin Dari (Gumbin Dari); Model Primary School Gangije (Gangije); Model Primary School Kaurar Sani I (Kaurar Saini I); Model Primary School Kaurar Sani II (Kaurar Saini II); Model Primary School Runtuwa (Runtuwa)
Aliero	Danwarai	Primary Health Centre Fada (Fada); Danwarai Primary School (Gebe); Open Space Opposite Public Well Here (Here); Open Space Lungun Kaura (Lungun Kaura); Open Space Opposite Borehole Rugga (Rugga)
Aliero	Jiga Birni	Open Space Opposite Mosque Filin Yamma (Filin Yamma); Model Primary School Gangije (Gangije); Ifad Bank Kasuwa (Kasuwa); Open Space Magorawa (Magorawa); Open Space Rugga Yamma (Rugga Yamma)
Aliero	Jiga Makera	Model Primary School Jiga Kambarori (Jiga Kambarori); Open Space Opposite Mosque Jiga Makera (Jiga Makera); Open Space Opposite Mosque Jiga Salah (Jiga Salah); Open Space Opposite Mosque Rugga (Rugga); Open Space Opposite Mosque Yar Gusau (Yar Gusau)
Aliero	Kashin Zama	Open Space Adarawa I (Adarawa I); Open Space Adarawa II (Adarawa II); Open Space Fada I (Fada I); Open Space Fada II (Fada II); Open Space Fada III (Fada III); Open Space Kaura Fili (Kaura Fili); Open Space Rini (Rini)
Aliero	Rafin Bauna	Model Primary School Rafin Mudi (Rafin Mudi); Model Primary School Unguwar Alu Dan Fili (Unguwar Alu Danfili); Model Primary School Unguwar Amadu (Unguwar Amadu); Open Space Opposite Market Unguwar Basharu (Unguwar Basharu); Model Primary School Unguwar Galadima (Unguwar Galadima); Model Primary School Unguwar Lawal Dan Fili (Unguwar Lawal Danfili)
Aliero	Sabiyal	Model Primary School Dakala (Dakala); Model Primary School Gwambali (Gwambali); Model Primary School Dan Fili (Danfili); Open Space Kyataku (Kyataku); Open Space Lungun Bula (Lungun Bula); Model Primary School Mar Maro (Marmaro)
Arewa	Bui	Asarara Primary School (Asakara ); Nizzamiyya Primary School Bui (Biu Sabon Zama ); Bui Sabon Gari (Biu S/Gari ); Bui Model Primary School (Tungar Labbo); Baggo Primary School (Baggo); Dangongora Primary School (Dangongora); Tintimi Primary School (Galewa Tintimi ); Gigani Primary School (Gigani ); Hikimawa Primary School (Hikimawa); Kwakware Primary School (Kwakware); Open Space (Kurfayawa); Mamunu Primary School (Mamunu Bare Bari); Makangara Primary School (Makangara); Maje Primary School (Maje Kuka); Tashar Isaka Primary School (Tashar Isaka); Tago Primary School (Tago ); U/Boka Primary School (U/Boka); U/Tsoho Promary School (U/Tsoho); Open Space (Tago Illela)
Arewa	Chibike	Chibike Babba Primary School (Chibike Babba); Chibike Primary School (Chibike Illela); Dogondaji Primary School (Dogon Daji ); Fawangu Primary School (Fawangu ); Farsangu Primary School (Farsangu ); Marake Primary School (Marake); Ramba Primary School (Ramba Mamman); Turmin Dutse Primary School (Turmin Dutse); Unguwar Muza Primary School (U/Muza); Kohobi Primary School (U/Zarmakwai); Eri Primary School (Eri)
Arewa	Daura/Sakkwabe/Jarkuka	Bachaka Primary School (Bachaka I ); Botawa Primary School (Botawa); Area Education Office (Bachaka II); Bingel Primary School (Bingel ); Open Space (Dukki Sakkwabe); Gamuzzah Primary School (Gamuzzah); Asibiti (Gwarmai); Jaja Primary School (Jaja); Asibiti (Kwakwaren Gamuzza); Mafaskara Primary School (Mafaskara B ); Jarkuka Primary School (Jarkuka); Sakwabe Primary School (Sakwabe); Daura Primary School (S/Garin Daura); Tulluwa Nprimary School (Tulluwa); Asibitin Jarkuka (Tsamiyar Jarkuka 'A'); Gidan Ruwa (Tsamiyar Jarkuka 'B'); Tungar Sarki Primary School (Tungar Sarki ); Zawaini Primary School (Zawaini ); Dogon Daji Primary School (Dogon Daji ); Tungar Turba Primary School (Tungar Turba); Danyeku Primary School (Danyeku)
Arewa	Gorun Dikko	G/Dikko Primary School (G/Dikko); Gubawa Primary School (Gubawa ); Ladari Primary School (Landari); U/Mauri Primary School (U/Mauri); U/Maigida Primary School (U/Maigida); Zamawa Primary School (Zamawa)
Arewa	Falde	Dalijan Primary School (Dalijan ); Falde Primary School (Falde 'A'); U/Imanna Primary School (Falde 'B'); Giddare Primary School (Giddare); Gorun Gora Primary School (Gorun Gora); Shalwai Primary School (Shalwai )
Arewa	Feske/Jaffeji	Aljanar Baidu Primary School (Aljanar Baidu); Feske Babba Primary School (Feske Babba ); Zabarma Primary School (Gumunde II); Ganza Primary School (Ganza); Jaffeji Primary School (Jaffeji); Feske Tudu Primary School (Feske Tudu 'A'); Feske Tudu Primary School (Feske Tudu 'B'); Yagwandi Primary School (Yagwandi ); Matseri Primary School (Matseri ); Kuri Babba Asibiti (Kuri Babba); Amagoro Primary School (Amagoro)
Arewa	Gumumdai/Rafin Tsaka	Adakaka Primary School (Adakaka); Dumbugaji Primary School (Dumbugaji); Gumki Primary School (Gumki); Gorun Ango Asibiti (Gorun Ango); Gumundai Primary School (Gumundai); Intali Primary School (Intali); Kuncin Baba Primary Primary School (Kunchin Baba); Kukar Mai Fulani Primary School (Kukar Mai Fulani); Rafin Tsaka Primary School (Rafin Tsaka); Unguwar Kolo Primary School (S/U/Muza); Shiko Primary School (Shiko); Shakala Primary School (Shakalar Bube); Tungar Sule Primary School (Tungar Sule); Unguwar Manomi Primary School (U/Kata); Unguwar Goje Primary School (U/Goje); Kunduda Primary School (U/Kunduda); Unguwar Gyargu Primary School (U/Gyargu); Goru Primary School (U/Danmarke); Unguwar Mato Primary School (U/Mato)
Arewa	Laima/Jantullu	Dangandu Primary School (Dangandu); Open Space (Daluwa); Kyada Primary School (Kyada); Laima Primary School (Laima 'A'); Asibiti Laima (Laima 'B'); Madamfara Primary School (Madamfara Yamma); Asibiti Madamfara (Madamfara Gabas); Sangela Primary School (Sangela); Tsamiya Primary School (Tsamiyar Daji ); Tunlun Dabaga Primary School (Tunlun Dabaga); Maitsaida Primary School (Maitsaida); Awashaka Primary School (Awashaka); Hudussu Primary School (Hudussu); Rimau Primary School (Rimau); Masamar Goje Primary School (Masama Goje ); Open Space (U/Chiffa); Kare Primary School (S/Kare Gabas I); Asibiti Kare (S/Kare Gabas II)
Arewa	Sarka/Dantsoho	Adigari Primary School (Adigari); Open Space (Asaukaka ); Bagizah Primary School (Bagizah); Asibti Banizumbu (Bani Zumbu ); Fakarar Antaru Primary School (Fakarar Antaru); Goru Primary School (Goru); Kuka Bakwai Primary School (Kuka Bakwai); Kalgo Primary School (Tungsr Kalgo); Kwakware Primary School (Kwakware ); Asibitin Rausar Liman (Rausar Liman); Sarka Primary School (T/Wada Sarka ); Open Space (Tullun Bori); Open Space (U/Boka); Zagabu Primary School (Zagabu ); K/Maimaiki Primary School (K/Maimaiki)
Arewa	Yeldu	Asibiti Dagwbro (Dagwabron Nomau); Dukki Primary School (Dukki Babba); Gwambara Primary School (Gwambara); Gandun Wala Primary School (Gandun Wala I); Asibiti Gandun Wala (Gandun Wala II); Kwanawa Primary School (Kwanawa); Kamzo Primary School (Kamzon Bozari ); Maikali Primary School (Maikali); Matankari Primary School (Matankari); Gidan Ruwa (Maje Tudu); Maidoka Primary School (S/Garin Yeldu \A\"\"")\'"; Gidan Ganye Yeldu (S/Garin Yeldu \B\"\"")\'"; U/Kibiya Primary School (U/Kibiya Yeldu); Open Space (Maigazari); Local Govt. Secretariat (Yeldu Arewa)
Argungu	Alwasa/Gotomo	Alwasa Model Primary School; U / Zumari; Ung. Maifatu; Tungar Marina; Tungar Rafi; Ummara Mamuda; Gotomo Makwashe; Gotomo Model Primary School; Indire; Gwabare; Dabire
Argungu	Dikko	Model Primary School Dankoji I; Model Primary School Dankoji II; Garkar Baraya; Kitarawa; Garkar S/Gobir; Mallamawa; Garkar - Dankumaji; Gidan Homa; Sabon Gari Primary School; Garkar Sagware; Dan-Mangwaro; Kofar Mai-Chibi; Kasuwar- Yar-Mahauta; Garkar Malan Mai Gatarin Baki
Argungu	Felande	Felande I; Felande II; Sabon Garin Kaduba; Dankirya; Boraye; Jada I And II; Sabon Garin Bachaka; Fakon Sarki; Tungar Noma; Tungar Kwalama; Kukoki; Kadubba Hassan; Bela; Ungawar Mali; Tungar Maidawa
Argungu	Galadima	Old Post Office; Barikin Gari; Kabanchi Display Area; Marinar Kaura; Kofar Tudu; Forestry I Area
Argungu	Gulma	Gulma S. P. S. Gulma; Gulma S. P. S. B.; Modaci; Dutsi; Fanfo; Dan Rini; Garkar Kurna; Garkar Adamu; Zazzagawa Road; Shiyar Illela; Garkar Ajiya
Argungu	Gwazange/Kisawa/U Gyaga	Unguwar Gyaga; Gwazange I; Gwazange II; Kisawa; Tungar Alkasin; Tungar Karangiya; Kamfani Sani; Wali
Argungu	Kokani North	Sarki Sani Model Pri. School; Old Prison; Dogo Kafi Mari Area; Local Government Ist Gate; Moh'D Mera Model Primary School; Baya Ta Haifu (Area); Matan Fada Area; Garkar S/Shanu B/ Kasuwa; Rijyar Barga (Area); Sabon Garin Gobirawa; Garkar Makama
Argungu	Kokani South	Sama Sec. School Arugungu; Rural Health Centre; Shehu K/Giwa Model Pri. School; Shehu K/Giwa Model Primary School II; Garkar Sarki Area; Garkar Justice Area I; Garkar Justice Area II; C. O. E. Gate I-II; Old Motor Park Area; Yar-Dole G/Maigandu Area; Lowcost Houses Area
Argungu	Lailaba	Lailaba Model Primary School; Baguni Model Primary School; Dani Fandu; Damba; Shiyar Galadima; Natsini Gada; Katanga Arewa; Bani Dai; Dagimun; Katangar Zabarma; Tungar Dan Magaji
Argungu	Sauwa/Kaurar Sani	Sauwa Primary School; Adult Education Class; B/Masallacin Jumu'A; Bakin Masallaci; Tungar Rai-Rai - Primary School; Kaura Sani Primary School; Bangola Primary School; Birnin Lafiya Primary School; Kukadu Primary School; Dalatu Primary School
Argungu	Tungar Zazzagawa/Rumbuki/Sarkawa	Tungar Zazzagawa Model Primary School; Illela; Tungar Batai; Zazzagawa; Raya Damtse; Tungar Mai-Samari; Sarkawa; Tungar Yari; Dan Kanawa; Rambuki
Augie	Augie North	Model Primiry School (Tshon Garin Augie); Model Primiry School (Shiyar Amadu); Mdgs Solar Pump (Shiyar Taji 1); Solar Pump (Shiyar Taji II); Water Boad (Shiyar Damane); Mdgs Solar Pump (Illelar Augie); Tungar Zabarmawa
Augie	Augie South	Kasuwa Augie; Gidan Taki (Sabon Garin Augie ); Tungar Noma Pri Sch (Tungar Noma); Village Centre (Gidan Dade); Village Centre (Rugga)
Augie	Bagaye/Mera	Bagaye Primary School; Bagaye Water Boad (Bagaye Garkar Noma); Bagare Dispensary (Bagaye Garkar Sani); Mallamawa Village Centre (Mallamawa); Mdgs Solar (Tungar Yodo); Gidan Jodi Primary School (Gidan Jodi); Village Centre (Rini Babba); Kurbaban Model Primary School (Kurbaban); Dariyawa Village Centre (); Mera Village Centre (Mera); Mera Village Centre (Mera Marina); Mera Dispensary (Mara Garkar Abduwa); Mera Water Boad (Mera Garkar Noma)
Augie	Bayawa North	Bayawa Police Station (Bayawa Garkar Kyala); Bayawa Town Dispenciry (Bayawa Da Gamaje); Bayawa Court (Bayawa Shiyar Kasuwa); Bayawa Primary Health Care (Tungar Kaji); Village Cetre (Asarara); Dafashi Dispensiry (Dafashi); Dafashi Pri School (Dafashi/Gazura); Kwarkwar Pri. School (Warkwari)
Augie	Bayawa South	Jabaka Dispensiry (Jabaka Kawari); Jabaka Pri. School (Jabaka Danfili); Sabuwar Maiyaki Pri. Sch (S/Maiyaki); Village Centre (Fakon Sarki); Zabdo Pri. School (Zabdo/Luttugaje); Bore Primary School (Bore); Yakurutu Pri. School (Yakurutu); Kafare Dispensiry (Kafare/T. Duma)
Augie	Birnin Tudu/Gudale	Filin Shiyar N. A (Birnin Tudu S/Na); Filin Kasuwa (Birnin Tudu Shiyar Maiyaki); Filin Mahauta (Birnin Tudu Shiyar Gandu); Sabon Gari Village Centre (S/G Birnin Tudu); Birnin Tudu Pri. School (Kirgwanda); Dukke Fillin Rijiya (Dukke G/Hakimi); Danfili Makera (Dukke Shiyar Makera); Dispensiry (Dukke Shiyar Shehe); Gudale Primary School; Primary Health (Gudale Kanwuri); Dan Filin Bakin Titi (Tungulawa); Dispensiry (Kwawari); Dankal Dispensiry (Dankal Kanwuri); Dankal Primary School; Gidan Koni Primary School (Gidan Koni); Bubuce Police Station (Asawara)
Augie	Bubuce	Bubuce Police Station (B/G/ Lamne); Bubuce Pri. Sch (B/G/Sarkin Fawa); Bubuce Dispensiry (B/G/Wanzam); Bubuce Dispensiry (Bubuce Garkar Liman ); Bubuce Dispensiry (Bubuce Garkarakwata); Bubuce Village Centre (Bangarawa Garkar Doka); Bubuce Pri. Sch (Bangarawa Garkar Doka); Bangarawa Pri Sch. (Bangarawa Garkar Lamne); Village Centre (Gidan Koni); Village Centre (Sabon Garin Dinkiri)
Augie	Dundaye/Kwaido/Zagi/Illela	Dundaye Pri Sch (Dundaye Garkar Umaru); Kasuwar Dudaye (Dundaye Garkar Mani); Village Centre (Kukar Kanna); Kwaido Primary School; Village Centre Kwaido (Kwaido Shiyar Arewa); Primary School (Sabon Garin Kwaido); Village Centre (Sattazai); Kasuwa Danfali (Sattazai Dan Fili); Illela Primary School; Kasuwar Illela (Illela Garkar Mode); Tungar Magaji Primary School (Tungar Magaji); Zaggi Primary School (Zagi Shiyar Arawa); Solar Pump Zaggi (Zagi Tambalawa); Tungar Rafi Primary School (Tungar Rafi); Village Centre (Tungar Tudu )
Augie	Tiggi/Awade	Tiggi Dispensiry (Tiggi Garkar Maidamma); Tiggi Secondary School (Tiggi Kasuwa); Lugga Primary School (Lugga); Villace Centre (Tungar Mairuwa); Gadi Wande Primary School (Madi Wande); Gidan Aguda Primary School; Gidan Agoda Primary School (Gidan Agoda Danfili); Farin Dutsi Primary School (Fakon Dutsi); Kwararo Primary School (Kwararo); Village Centre (Tungar Dan Gwari); Shafarma Primary School (Shafarma ); Yalema Primary School (Yalema); Fasi Sanka Primary School (Fasi Sanka); Awade Primary School; Awade Kasuwa Primary School (Awade Kasuwa)
Bagudo	Bagudo/Tuga	Shiyar Abdu Babba; Shiyar Bello-Dogo (A); Shiyar Bello-Dogo (B); Shiyar Hantsi-Giwa; Shiyar Makaranta (A); Shiyar Makaranta (B); Shiyar Sarauniya; Shiyar Yado; Shiyar Umaru Malari; R/Namatu Ulu; Tungar Baushe; Yuna; Mai Zagga/Sawabai; Soshiya; Tuga; T/Hima; Tulluwa; R/Kura; Marake; Mailafiya; Garin-Yidi Fada
Bagudo	Bahindi/Boki-Doma	Bahindi; Tungan-Ango; Bokki-Doma; Buda; Kaliel I; Kaliel II; Tungan Marafa; Tungan - Alhaji; Idowa
Bagudo	Bani/Tsamiya/Kali	Bani I; Bani II; Tungan Mallam Maishanu; Gidan - Zana; Tafama; Tungan Alhaji; Sambe; Shangi; Kali; Takalafiya; Tungan - Arawa; Kangiwa; Tungan Gwani; Tsamiya; Rugga Tsamiya; Mahuta; Tungan Samaila; Tungan Gube; Darussalam
Bagudo	Illo/Sabon/Gari/Yantau	Danajillo; Fada Illo; Fazu Illo; Kawo-Kirai; Wangara Illo; Sabon Gari; Yantala
Bagudo	Kaoje/Gwamba	Shiyar Noma (A); Shiyar Noma (B); Bakube/Baitinga (A); Bakube/Baitinga (B); Nufare; Kwa; Tungan - Goge; Tungan Hassan; Yamusa; Karalleju; Daranna; Bakin - Ruwa; Rugga/Bassa; Maje; Kaudu; Sire-Here; Orda; T/Wada/Yamusa; Buya; T/Kawo; Gendame; Zugu; Gwambe I; Gwambe II; Rahaya; Busura; Zuga - Janna
Bagudo	Kende/Kurgu	Shiyar Makaranta; Shiyar Gandu (A); Shiyar Gandu (B); Tungar Akoda; Tildeje; Shiyar Marafa; Tunga Kibiya; Ruwan - Dutsi; Sabon Garin Kende; Tungal Bata; Tungal Illo; Lani Birni; Rinaye; Kumbobo; Tungar Alu; Yakamata; Kurgu; Riniyel; Tungar Yari
Bagudo	Lafagu/Gante	Lafagu Birni I; Lafagu Birni II; Tungan Lafagu; Tungan Maje; Kawata; Tungan Lawal; Wahanu Kwarfa; Ganten Fadama; Arego; Ganten Tudu; Jipare; Takalafiya; Guwarsu
Bagudo	Lolo/Giris	Lolo Shiyar Fada; Tungar Maigoda; Kangakarous I; Kangakarous II; Nassarawa; Tungan Chama; Tungan Kunji; Nafa; Tunga Kalgo; Kasati; Tungar Sarkin Birki; Tondi; Sarbun; Tungan Baye; Tungan Yamma; Giris I; Giris II; Tungan Giris; Gatawous; Geshara; Tungan Barje; Kuru - Kuru
Bagudo	Matsinka/Geza	Matsinka; Farda; Bargawa; Tillala; Tungan Jibbo; Bahindin; Geza; Zugun - Bagudu
Bagudo	Sharabi/Kwanguwai	Sharabi I; Sharabi II; S/Garin Zagga; Fanfarau; Tungan Shanga; Kwanguwai; Garanda; Tungan Mamman; Tungan Gero; Maitanbari I; Maitanbari II
Bagudo	Zagga/Kwasara	Aliyu B. Haruna; Shiyar Noma Zaggi; Auta Hariga Makau; Bani Nera/Piliya; S/Dadare; Sabon-Birnin Hausawa; Auta Hariga Dallo; Tungar - Daka; Maisokoto; Molakaci; T/Kaka/Jibo; T/Baji; T/Gumarin/Nagudale; Shiyar Fulani K; Shiyar Ubandawaki; T/Wanzam; T/Maitandai; T/Sauna; Rugga Dikko; T/Gummai/Hassan; T/Wanzam/Talho; Shiyar Noma K
Birnin Kebbi	Nassarawa - I	Shiyar Fada Council Chambers; Shiyar Fada Miyatti Allah; Shiyar Fada G/Umaru Junju; Shiyar Zabarmawa G/Mamman Nass.; Shiyar Zabarmawa G/Natsafe; Shiyar Zabaramawa G/Sarki Zabarmawa; Gra G/Dr. Gulma; Gra G/Kindi Zauro; Bayau / Tasha G/Umaru Sabon Gari; Kasuwa G/ Sarkin Fawa; Bello Way G/Abdu Hafizi; Bello Way G/Waziri; Bello Way G/Saidu Maigishiri; Massalacin Gwadan Gwaji; Perm Site Gesse Quarters; Garkar Sunday A. Z.; Bulasa Garkar Dikko; Nursing Quarters Garkar Garba Koko
Birnin Kebbi	Nassarawa II	Makera Gandu Prison Quarters; Makera Gandu G/Moh'D Umaru); Makerar Gandu G/Maaji Manu; Makerar Gandu Gidan Dan Iro; Makerar Gandu W. T. C.; Makerar Gandu G/Mai Alelu; Makerar Gandu Govt. Science College; Makerar Gandu Buhari Model Pri. Sch.; Shiyar Sarakuna G/Majidadi; Shiyar Sarakuna G/Wali; Ung. Dambo G/Hakiml Ung. Dambo; Kudancin Nass G/Noma Maihatsi; Kudancin Nasas H. A. T. C. Secteriat; Kudancin Nass G/Bala Sani Kangiwa; Nass Tsakiya G/Isa Kwaifa; Rafin Atiku G/Haliru Abubakar; Rafin Atiku G/Marigayi Shehu Auditor; Rafin Atiku G/Sardaunan Nass
Birnin Kebbi	Birnin Kebbi Marafa	Majema G/ Sarkin Karma; Majema G/H/Umaru Lori; Tudun Wada G/Liman Sarki; Baiti Limanci G/Ladan Na Musa; Baiti G/Uban Doma; S/Labbo Maijirgi G/Labbo Maijirgi; Majema G/Shehu Gaga; Tudun Wada G/Magatarkarda; Takalan G/Hakimi; Tudun Wada G/Gago; Takalau G/ Boyi Mairake; Tudun Wada G/Iyan B/Kebbi
Birnin Kebbi	Birnin Kebbi Dangaladima	Shiyar Mala G/Maiaji Sa'adu; Zoramawa G/Yara Nata'aka; Zoramawa G/Dangaladima Bello; Zoramawa G/Shehu Zalaka; Illecar Uyari G/Arzika Asbin; Kofar Dindi G/Arzika Na Zauro; Sabon Birni G/Gwango Gumba; Dutsin Idi G/Dandare Bage; Gamagira G/Alh. Jafaru; Yanyara G/Sanda Bunza; Kofar Dindi G/Dankala
Birnin Kebbi	Kola /Tarasa	Tarasa G/Liman Tarasa; Tarasa G/Umaru Liman; Tarasa G/Umaru; Ilola G/M/Teunit; Ilola Tvc Ilola Gunrgwabe; Ilola G/M/Fari; Badariya Fillin Masallau; Badariya G/Umaru Saje; Wuro Maliki G/Amiru; Ung. Kayi G/Hakimi; Ung. Gero G/Hakimi; Dukkowo G/A. Dukkuwo
Birnin Kebbi	Maurida /Karyo/Ung. Mijin-Nana	Maurida Tvc Maurida; Ung. Mai'Arsun G Hakimi; Babban Dutsi Tvc Babban Dutsi; Gwambara Tvc Gwambara; Ung. Mijin Nana G/Hakimi; Bunga Primary School Bunga; Ung. Bagudu G/Hakimi; Ung. Gadon Kura G/Hakimi; Sandagu/U/Bawa Karkashin Dorawa; Karyo Fili Filin Kuri Karyo; Kwasandi G/Hakimi Kwasandi; Alabani G/Hakimi Alabani; Alfagai G/Hakimi Alfagai; Ung. Saini Gado G/Hakimi; Kwasandi; Unguwar Saini
Birnin Kebbi	Gwadangaji	Gwadan Gaji M. P. S. Gwandangaji; Banigatari/Yammanuari G/Hakimi Yammari; Yawurawa G/Sabo Wakili; Busawa Gmairiga Wakili; Banigatari G/Magaji; Kabawa Kabawa Massacinci; Busawa Kasuwar Daji Busawa; Kawara G/Ubandawaki Kawara; Gazo G/Dikko Gazo; Kasuwa Daji; Gigaji Masallaci (Dan - Fili)
Birnin Kebbi	Zauro	Tungar Buzu G/H/Tugan Buzu; Sabon Gari M. P. S. S/Gari Zauro; Ung. Zabarmawa G/H/ Ung. Zabarmawa; Hammari Tvc Hammari; Rijir Naye G/Umaru Dalhatu; Zauro G/Dikko N. Zauro; Gandewo G/Alhaji Na Allah G.; Baggo G/Alh. Jabbo; Jagarawo G/Alh. Ango; Zauro G/Dantsino; Zauro G/ Dikko
Birnin Kebbi	Gawasu	Gawassu Makaranta; Akwara G/Magaji; Damawa G/Dikko Damawa; Goriyo G/Hakimin Goriyo; Maifulani Garuar Wakili; Gaiwako G/Hakimin Gain Allo; Guraguri G/Maiyaki; Littagawo G/Dikko; Takalafiya G/Hakimi; Ung. Nasamu G/Dikko; Ung. Sarki G/Marafa
Birnin Kebbi	Kardi/Yamama	Kardi G/Sarkin Kabi; Kardi G/Dawsabon Gari; Kardi G/Sarkin Bussa; Kardi G/ Sarkin Hausawa; Kardi Kasuwar Daji; Yamama G/Na'Ibin Yamama; Yamama G/Hakimin Harasawa; Yamama G/Hakimi Janbaki; Yamama G/Hakimin Ung. Narba; Yamama G/H/Sabon Gari; Yamama G/H/ Ung. Nainu; Nufawa G/Magajin Nufawa; Nufuwa G/Dukkon Matankari; Nufuwa G/Hakimin Wasaba; Nufuwa Bakin Kasuwa Kardi; Gidan Sarkin Kasuwa
Birnin Kebbi	Lagga	Lagga G/Hakimin Lagga; Bame Fadama G/H/Bame Fadama; Bame Runji G/H/Bame Runji; Janzomo G/Kakare; Janzomo Bakin Kasuwa Janzomo; Randali G/Marafa; Randali G/Alh. Shehu; Lagga G/Adamu Wakili; Bame Mairuwa G/Malam Salihu; G/ Adamu Wakili; G. Marafa (Dan-Fili) Kardi
Birnin Kebbi	Gulumbe	Gulumbe G/Dangaladima; Gulumbe Kofar Gwanki; Gulumbe Bakin Kasuwa Gulumbe; Bauada G/Malam Aminu Bauada; Ung. Zabarmawa G/Dalhatu; Fillingo G/H/Illelar Fillingo; Asarara G/Hakimi Asarara; G/Kwangi
Birnin Kebbi	Ambursa	Ambursa G/Hakimin Dangaladima; Arbiu Ladan G/Hakimin Arbin Ladan; Ambursa G/H/Sarkin Hdtsi; Mangarawa G/H/Mangarawa; Ambursa M. P. S. A Ambursa; Kwaddaga G/Hakimin Kwaddaga; Kasuwa Karama Bakin Kasuwa Karama; Ambursa G/Mijin Diya; Ambursa G/Sanda Rogo; Ambursa G/Shehu Zango; Nufuwa G / Mainu Fawa; G/ Mai Nufawa
Birnin Kebbi	Ujariyo	Ujariyo G/Hakimin Ujariyo; Asara G/H/Asarara; Ung. Sarsan G/H Ung. Sarsan; Sargagi G/H/Sargagi; Junju G/Hakimin Junju; Tsamiya G/Hakimin Tsamiya; Ung. Magaji G/Hakimin Ung. Magaji; Dagere G/Hakimin Dagere; Tunga Lande G/H/Tungar Lande; Mocciyo G/Hakimin Mocciyo; Ung. Ganwo G/Hakimin Ung. Ganwo; Dangarso G/Hakimin Dangarso; Sargagi G. H.
Bunza	Bunza Marafa	Bajifa Bajifa; Lowcost/Mungolo Lowcost; Balu Balu; Juganbir; Golgolore/Fawa Golgolore Rijiya; Geru I And II Geru; S/Garin Jika S/Garin Jika
Bunza	Bunza Dangaladima	Wuro -Yasi - Wuro - Yasi; Bajifa/Makera - Bajifa/Makera; Bajifa/Makera Bajifa/ Makera B; Katanga Katanga; Gidan-Jirgi Gidan Jirgi; Sunkuru Sunkuru; Wabbaku Wabbaku; S/Fada A And B S/Fada A/B; T/Riskuwa/Marina T/Riskuwa/Marina
Bunza	Gwade	Gwada/S/Noma Gwade/S/Noma; Gwade /S/Noma - Gwade S/Noma; Damana Damana; Bachaka Bachaka; Owa Owa; Bangaye Bangaye; Mallamawa Mallamawa; Dankire Dankire
Bunza	Maidahini	Madahinis/Fada Maidahini S/Fada; Nomare Nomare; Garadi Yamma Garadi Yamma; Gardai Gabas Garadi Gabas; Runtuiwa Runtuiwa; T/Budurina T/Budurina; Kutunare Kutunare
Bunza	Raha	Raha/Fada Raha/Fada; Busare A Busare; Busare B Busare; Billare Billare; Sabe Sabe; Matseri Matseri; Gumbire Gumbire
Bunza	Salwai	Salwai/Fada Salwai/Fada; Salwai/S/Kengere Salwai S/Kengere; Chakawo Chakawo; Babanjori Baban-Jori; Gede/Karama Gede Karama; Gede Sauna Gede Sauna; Bala Bala
Bunza	Tilli/Hilema	Tillis/Fada Tilli S/Fada A; Tilli S/Fada Tilli S/Fada B; Tilli S/Noma Tilli S/Noma; Tullumawa Tullu-Mawa; Hilema Hilema; Kanzanna Kanzanna; Yanga Tozo Yanga Tozo; Afaja/U/Saidu Afaja U/Saidu; Sabon Garin -Jika Sabon Garin-Jika
Bunza	Tunga	Marina Marina; Wuro-Yasi Wuro-Yasi; Gwadi Gwadi; Kahibile Kahibile; Yarwal Yarwal; Tunga S/Liman Tunga S/Liman
Bunza	Zogrima	Zogirma S/Fada Zogirma S/Fada A; Zogirma S/Fada Zogirma S/Fada B; Bawada Bawada; Gidigo Gidigo; Tsamiya Tsamiya; Dukki Dukki; Guddul Guddul; Manun Kulu Manun - Kulu
Dandi	Bani Zumbu	Garkar Magaji/Garkar Magaji; Gwasadi Gwasadi; Masama Masama; Yalawa Yalawa; Kofo Kofo; Wasale Wasale; Tungal Keke/Tkeke Maigari; Tungar Mai Gari; Lalebu Lalebu; Tungar Bankani /Tbankoni; Tungar Nankoni / T/Nomau; Maidaji Maidaji
Dandi	Dolekaina	Garkar Magaji Garkar Magaji; Garkar Magaji; Tungar Nomanada Tungar Noma; Dolekaina Primary School; Dolekaina Babbar Garkar; Tungar Sule Tungar Sule; Lekyangu Lekyangu; Garkar Marafa Tudun Wada
Dandi	Fana	Fana Makaranta Daji 'A'; Fana Makaranta Daji 'B'; Tungar Maidaji Tungar Maidaji; Tungar Kaka T/Kaka; Isah Kaina Dogo; Tabkin Sansani; Sabon Gida; Ung. Bakoshi; Tungar Zagi Tungar Zagi; Tungar Wundi Tungar Wundi; Tungar M. Jabbo; Tungar Noma; Kurya Kurya; Fana Makaranta Gari Makaranta Gari 'A'; Fana Makaranta Gari Makaranta Gari 'B'
Dandi	Maihausawa	Tela Primary School; Mudi Model Primary School; Garkar Ibrotela G/Ibrotela; Garkar Abba Shuwa/Gabba Shuwa; Garkar Alasan Gwamna G/Alasan Gwamna; T/Maizuma G/Maizuma; Dogon Rini Dogon Rini; G/Bawa Maiborodi
Dandi	Kyangakwai	Marina / Marina; Ung. Hassan U/Hassan; Gorun Yamma G/Yamma; Gorun Barmu G/Barmu; Sabon Gari S/Gari; Kyangakwai 'A' Kyangakwai Pri. Sch.; Kyangakwai 'B' Kyangakwai Pri. Sch.; Shiyar Gada Fingilla, Shiyar Gada Fingilla; Garkar Sharu, Garkar Sharu; Tungar Noma, Tungar Noma; Tungar Bauma, Tungar Bauma; Mallam Yaro, Mallam Yaro; Tungar Muza, Tungar Muza
Dandi	Geza	Garkarsako Fadi Garkar Sako 'A'; Garkar Sako Fadi 'B'; Dukushi Makaranta; Babban Tabki Babban Tabki; Balu Makaranta Balu Makaranta; Belin Maikama Belin Maikama; Belin Zumbai Belin Zumbai; Ung. Sanyi Ung. Sanyi; Tungar Kade; Geza Makaranta Geza Primary School; Yawurya Yawurya; Belin Nassarawa B/Nassarawa; Dogon Daji; Tungar Baido Tungar Baido
Dandi	Kamba / Kamba	Garkar Turawa; Baguma Kwara; Garkar Galadima; Gidan Ruwa Zango Gidan Ruwa; Kamba Kara 'A'; Kamba Kara B; Malam Yaro; Tukurwa Tukurwa; Zango Primary School; Garkar D/Kwala G/Dankwala; Gorun D/Gwallo Gorin D/Gwallo; Bariki Wajen Wasa; Barki Wajen Wasa; Garkar Umaru Maikanti G/Umaru
Dandi	Kwakkwaba	Kwakwaba Primary School; Ung. Zakaru; Tungar Yankori; Wayekai; Sabon Garin Sarhu; Tsika
Dandi	Maigwaza	Maigwaza Makaranta Fulani; Sabon Gari; Gidakai Giodakai; Rudun Bisa; Gidan Dobi Gidan Dobi
Dandi	Shiko	Ona; Garkar Noma Gari G/Noma; Gorun Mallam; Shiko Makaranta; Rijiyar Maikabi; Nayadiya Nayadiya; Tungar Noma Dutse T/Noma Dutse
Fakai	Bajida	Pri Sch Bajida (Primary School Bajida); Govt Sec Sch Bajida (S Musa Res); Turba Gele Pri Sch (Hassan Tudu Gele Res); Pri Sch G. Dantani (Isah Musa Dantani Res); Pri Sch Chidawa (Magaji Salisu Bature Res); Pri Sch Kukum Auda (Waziri Hakimi Res); Manya Pri Sch (Danjumma Galadima Res); Pri Sch Kukum Maigoro (Primary School Kukum Maigoro); Pri Sch Boko (Hassan Hakimi Res); Pri Sch Rutuwa Magaji (Hamisu Rutuwa Res); Pri Sch Maikabi (Tudun Wada Maikabi Res)
Fakai	Bangu/Garinisa	Primary School Bangu (Pri Sch. Bangu); Primary School Noma Kawo (Hassan Kasim Res); Open Space (S/Kudu Maidanga Res); Open Space (Dandodo Matseri Res); Primary School Maigaraya (Hussaini Maigaraya Res); Primary School Garin Isah (Mamuda Res); Primary School G/Tudu (Malam Garba Res); Open Space (Hakimi Tukur Res); Open Space (Umar Bako Moda Res)
Fakai	Birnin Tudu	Lea Office (Lea Office); Pri Sch. Matseri (Pri Sch. Matseri); Pri Sch. T Yawo (Pri Sch. T Yawo); Pri Sch. Uchiri (Pri Sch. Uchiri); Pri Sch. Rijiyar Kaza (Bani Kaza Res); Urgun Pri Sch (S. Fawa Magaji Res); Pri Sch. Azangali (Pri Sch. Azangali); Pri Sch Chitte (Pri Sch. Chitte); Open Space (Hakimi Hassan Dutse Res)
Fakai	Gulbin Kuka/Maijarhula	Pri Sch G Kuka (Pri Sch G/Kuka); Pri Sch Kawo (Balarabe Kawo Res); Pri Sch Barbada (Garba Ahmad Barbada Res); Town Disp. Audu Iri (Hashimu Res); Pri Sch Maijarhulla (Idris Maijarhulla Res); Pri Sch S. Gari (Haruna Monde S. Gari Res); Pri Sch. Bule (Abubakar Bule Res); Open Space (Hakimi Hassan Res)
Fakai	Inga(Bulu) Maikende	Pri Sch Maikende (Pri Sch. Maikende); Pri Sch Ba'are (Pri Sch. Ba'are); Kamtu Pri Sch (Opp. Moh'D Jari Kamtu Res); Open Space (Hakimin Geji Res); Open Space (Hakimin Garba Gado Res); Pri Sch (Hakimi Labbo Achuku Res); Pri Sch (Abubakar Bulu Res); Chazgu Pri Sch (Hassan Dama Res); Kiri Pri Sch (Hassan Moh'D Kiri Res); Garin Awal Pri Sch (Mamman Hakimi Res)
Fakai	Kangi	Pri Sch Kangi (S/Dada Sani Res); Pri Sch Jagala (Audu Jegada Res ); Dispensary Gobiraje (Abu Awal Res); Pri Sch Asarara (Abdul Asarara Res); Open Space (H/Damana Daji Res); Open Space (G/M. Saleh Res); Open Space (G/Liman Res); Open Space (S/Baure Res)
Fakai	Fakai/Zussun	Lea Pri Sch (Lea Pri Sch); Pri Sch Jinga (M. Hakimi Jinga Res); Pri Sch T/Daji (H. Salisu Adamu Res); Pri Sch Gbala (Isah Bala Res); Lea Pri Sch Kuka (Lea Pri Sch Kuka); Jss Kuka (Lea Pri Sch Kuka); Pri Sch Namata (K. Galadima Res); Pri Sch T. Zama (S. D Res); Pri Sch Maidamisa (S. Daji Res); Open Space (Baso Res); Pri Sch Mori Kuluh (K. Gura-Guri Res); Open Space (M. I Badariya Res)
Fakai	Marafa	Lea Pri Sch (Ubankasa Res); J. S. S Marafa (Waziri Res); Lea Pri Sch Gunabi (M. Gunabi Res); Lea Pri Sch Maidangwami (U. Adamu Res); Lea Pri Sch Rumfa (S/Umaru Res); Lea Pri Sch Amiru (Adamu Amiru Res); Dispensary Kirgi (Hakimi Aliyu Res); Lea Pri Sch (Alh Attahiru Res); Open Space (Hakimi Hashimu Res); Open Space (Hakimi Sifawa Res)
Fakai	Penin Amana/Penin Gaba	Yoko; Tungar Annai; Ubidu; Ukwori; Farin Ruwa; Jika Fada; Shantali; Sose; Garkuwa
Gwandu	Cheberu/Bada	Amore Babba - D/ Fili; Amore Babba - Makaranta; Amore Aduwoyi; Danjema; Magun; Cheberu; Ruggar Boye; Gandatobe; Maitsane; Mammawa; Bada; Rango; Wararin Magaji; Gandu; Garin Bunzugu
Gwandu	Dalijan	Barama; Langarma; Bundu Sule A; Dalijan Filin Ibro; Dalijan G/Hassan; Dalijan G/Bello B. C.; Dalijan Kasuwa; Dalijan Filin Nuhu; Nufawa; Gwanyal; Wararin Zoramwa; Gwabare Maikasuwa; Gwabare Maikasuwa Makaranta; Gwabare Sakke; Ung Kade
Gwandu	Dodoru	Dodoru; Ung. Inna; Gorkomodo; Kalbanga; Kaurare Kasuwa; Kaurare Dan Fili; Bakoshi; Yole Bakahalbuwa; Yole Birni; Yole Birni/Ruggar Wuri; Magorawa; Guramawa
Gwandu	Gulmare	Gitta Birni; Gitta Noma; Gulmare Makaranta; Gulmare G. S/Gobir; Sauna Kochi; Guyawa; Illela; Madadi; Tari G/Magaji / Dan Fili; Tari G/Magaji '/ Makaranta; Tari Kasuwa -Gabas; Tari Kasuwa Yamma; Yole Maimiya; Rugga Wuri
Gwandu	Gwandu Marafa	Dalherawa; Dalherawa G/S/Yaki; Garkar S/Gabas; Garkar S/Gwandu; Binanci G/Marafa; Binanci G/Marafa Marina; Binanci Kanwuri; Adarawa; Garkar M. Ja'afaru; Garkar M. Ja'afaru Kofar Baguri; Ung. Inuwa
Gwandu	Gwandu Sarkin Fawa	Kuragishiri; Garbadawa; Garkar Danhassan; Garkar Zaki Zakara; Garkar Nagoggo; Garkar Garba Argungu; Garkar S/Fawa; Hamdallah; Yole Makangara
Gwandu	Kambaza	Kambaza Garkar Umaru; Kambaza Kasuwa; Kambaza G/Kulu Haja; Takarin Hausawa; Kambaza Fulani G/Magaji; Kambaza G/S/Fawa; Takarin Fulani; Matseri; Danmagiro
Gwandu	Maruda	Gumbai G/Kokani; Gumbai Makaranta; Kuyu; Jariyaje; Kurya; Maruda Kanwuri; Maruda G/S/Fawa; Naman Goma G/Hakimi; Naman Goma Makaranta; Kwazari - Dan Fili; Kwazari - Makaranta; Ruggardawa; Sabon Birni
Gwandu	Malisa	Gora Kwattido G/Dikko; Gora Kwattido Danfili; Gyartau; Illelar Gora; Gora Sullubawa G/Maiyaki; Gora Sullubawa G/Liman; Ruggar Dutse; Dabagi - Kanwuri; Karangiya Makaranta; Ketare - G/Maigari; Tufara - G/Maigari; Malisa G/Dikko; Malisa Hugiyal; Rinaye; Gurunshi - G/Maigari
Gwandu	Masama Kwasgara	Kwazgara Makaranta; Wuroyandu G/Hakimi; Budai - G/Hakimi; Sasseda - Makaranta; Masama G/Sanyinna; Masama G/Liman; Masama Makaranta; Masama G/Noma; Badadi; Yalango G/Maiyaki; Rumbuki G/ Hakimi
Jega	Alelu/Gehuru	Guyawa, Alelu Makaranta; Kasuwa, Alelu; Sarkawa, Alelu Filin Sarkawa; Attagara, Dan Fili; Bawanka, Makaranta; Dukkuna/Rafi Filin Cediya; Fada, Gehuru; Sarkawa, Gehuru Makaranta; Jadadi, Makaranta; Jadadi/Asarara, Filin Kasuwa Jadadi; Tanza, Makaranta
Jega	Dangamaji	Alkalawa 'A' / B, Makaranta; Bamungabe, Dan Fili; Babban Dutse, Dan Fili; Birnin - Madi, Makaranta; Kofar Marafa, Dangamaji; Danfili Kasuwa, Dangamaji; Shiyar Kaura, Dangamaji; Dantawaye, Makaranta; Dudduke, Makaranta; Ung. Yalaudu Lugu, Dan Fili; Ung. Madi 'A / B, Dan Fili; Ung. Hali, Dan Fili; Ung. Alu Bukari, Dan Fili
Jega	Dunbegu/Bausara	Dunbegu B/Gida, Dan Fili; Dunbegu/Jallawa, Makaranta; Maza - Goma, Dan Fili; Basaura Babban Gida, Garkar Danjuma; Basaura - E Galawa, Makaranta; Langido, Dan Fili; Bara, Dan Fili; Bakabe, Dan Fili; Tsirarrai, Dan Fili; Ung. Manu, Dan Fili; Ung. Garji, Makaranta; Ung. Danmaimuna, Makaranta
Jega	Gindi/Nassarawa/Kyarmi/Galbi	Danfili Galbi; Marina Gindi; Kurna Gindi; Garkar Hali Gra; Danfili, Illela; Shiyar Birni Kyarmi, Gidan T. V; Danfili Kyarmi; Danfili Massalacin Zarya; Fada, Nassarawa; Nassarawa Primary School
Jega	Jandutsi/Birnin Malam	Agwada Rijiyar D/Babarka; Agwaoba Kasuwa; Birnin Malam Fada A; Birnin Malam Magaji B, Makaranta; Helende, Dan Fili; Ingarje, Dan Fili; Jandutse Fada / Kasuwa; Jandutse Kaura, Garka Dan Sani; Maciri, Garka Alu Maciri; Tanza, Mangwaro; Tabkin Kada, Kasuwa
Jega	Jega Firchin	Fircinawa 'A', Gidan Shawara; Fircinawa 'B', Tsohon Banki; Nufawa A / B, Kara Kantin D/Ladi; Gobirawa 'A' / 'B', Garkar Alh. Gyendane; Kolan - Koji, Dan Fili; Mai - Jirgi A / B, Jega Garkar Maijirgi; Sabon Gari A / B, Jega Model Pr. School; Ung. Fircin, Dan Fili; Zabarmawa 'A' / 'B', Bakin Gulbi Pr. School; Fircinawa, Garkar Mamman Karasha
Jega	Jega Kokani	Fada Court Yard; Fada Gidan Kokani; Ginga Gidan Adamu Wazam; Fada Goriba; Ginga Gidan Alhaji Mashayabo; Marinar Waje Gidan Halilu Gurmu; Marinar Waje Gidan Alh. Garba; Marina Kofa, Garkar Amadu Organizer; Razai, Garkar Magawata; Sadam Gidan Sarki; Ung. Dodo, Dan Fili; Ung. Rasiku Danfili; Yarga Danfili
Jega	Jega Magaji 'B'	Gamu Gaku, Dan Fili; Gomozon Jegawa, Dan Fili; Gomozon Yari, Makaranta; Sabon Gari, Gidan Dankontagora; Sabon Gari (Niima Gidan Taki); Sabon Gari (Niima Gargar Sardauna); Sabon Gari, Gargar Amadu Teacher; Sabon Gari, Gargar Dumbuji; Sabon Gari, Garkar Musa Kafinta; Sabon Gari, Zonal Land Office
Jega	Jega Magaji 'A'	Birnin Yari Primary School ' A'; Filin Baji 'A' / B, Garkar Abubakar Mijinyawa; Birnin Yari 'A', Garkar Bala Bature; Birnin Yari 'B', Garkar Alh. Yusuf Biyari; Kaurar Rogo A / B, Garkar Majidadi; Takalimawa A / B, Garkar Alh. Arjika Soda; Kaurar Lailai, Garkar Alh. Abdu Kaura; Mallamawa, Garkar Alh. Sahabi; Kasurwar Rini, Kasuwar Rini; Aduwar Yar Mayalo A / B; Tabuda, Gadar Tabuda; Sabon Gari A / B, Gadar Abba Maiburodi; Sabon Gari, Garkar S/Kabi; Nizaimyya Primary School 'A' / 'B'
Jega	Katanga/Fagada	Katanga Akalawa, Dan Fili; Katanga Kaura, Makaranta; Katanga Gumbin-Dari, Dan Fili; Katanga Kanbarawa 'A' / 'B', Fagada Karama; Fagada Ubandawaki S/Hali; Fagada Ubandawaki Shiyar Kaura
Jega	Kimba	Akalawa, Kimba Makaranta; Kimba Fada, Garka Muza; Kimba Fakku, Fakku Danko D/Fili; Kimba Geza, Geza Makaranta; Kankarawai A/B, Garkar Maigari; Kaura A / B, Kimba Garkar M. Yahya; Kuitane, Makaranta; Kuitane, Kasuwa; Sanagi, Dan Fili; Tullaye, Dan Fili
Kalgo	Badariya/Magarza	Badariya Gari; Biri Gari; Hirishi Gari; Magare/Ung. Tudu; Magarza Shiyar Gabas; Magarza Shiyar Yamma
Kalgo	Dangoma/Gayi	Asarara Gari; Bakoshi Gari; Dangoma Shiyar Liman; Dangoma Shiyar Kudu; Gayishiyar Runji Asibiti (Gayi Shiyar Runji); Gayi Shiyar Hakimi; Tungar Noma Gari; Yanga Hausa/Fulani; Tsola Gari
Kalgo	Diggi	Sidiku Marafa Pri. Sch(Diggi Shiyar Bokkire); Diggi Shiyai Illela 'A'; Diggi Sec. Sch. Diggi III (Diggi Kofar Yamma); Diggi Shiyar Dangaladima; Diggi Shiyar Turmawa; Ung. Arawa; Diggi Shiyar Yallabe
Kalgo	Etene	Gangare Gari; Keta Hausawa; Keta Fulani Asibiti (Keta Fulani I); Keta Filani II Primary School (Keta Fulani II); Etene Shiyar Arewa; Etene Shiyar Kudu
Kalgo	Kalgo	Amanawa Gari Asibiti (Amanawa Gari ); Kalgo Shiyar Arewa I; Kalgo Shiyar Arewa II; Kalgo Tsakiya I; Kalgo Tsakiya II; Kalgo Shiyar Kudu I; Kalgo Shiyar Kudu II; Ung. Dikko; Ung. Jeji; Ung. Sale
Kalgo	Mutubari	Banganna Gari Ia; Banganna Gari 1b Dispensary (Banganna Gari 1b); Mutubari Shiyar Gabas; Mutubari Shiyar Yamma; Kusa Ga Masallaci Open Space (Herebe Kwaidowo); Kusa Ga Masallaci Open Space (Tunga Sabo Gari)
Kalgo	Nayilwa	Kutukullu Gari; Mandinka Gari; Nayilwa Pri. School (Nayilwa Gari); Sandare Gari; Ung. Dodo; Ung. Yalli; Ung. Rafi I; Ung. Rafi II; Ung. Maiyaki I; Ung. Maiyaki II
Kalgo	Wurogauri	Wurogauri Shiyar Kokani; Wurogauri Shiyar Magaji; Wurogauri Shiyar Gareji; Tuduwo/Shadadi 'I'; Tuduwo Shadadi 'II'
Kalgo	Zuguru	Zuguru Shiyar Kogore; Kwuimi Gari; Zuguru Shiyar Lunke; Zuiguru Shiyar Kasuwa
Koko/Besse	Koko Magaji	Garkar Sarki; Bumawa; Badarawa; Dandabi; Dankade; Garkar Magaji I; Garkar Magaji / Yaki Da Jahilci; Garkar Idris Koko; Garkar Wakili; Garkar Isa Nagwaronyo; Asibiti (Dispensary)
Koko/Besse	Illela/S/Gari	Koko Magaji Primary School; Kawon Idi Tsoho; Dan Dashe; Garkar Umaru Ba'are I; Garkar Umaru Ba'are II; Gwadabawa; Illela Gabas; Illela Yamma; Tungar M. Bako; Tungar Atto; Nassarawa
Koko/Besse	Koko Fircin	Makaranta / Salihu M. P. S.; G. R. A., Kwana; Garkar Liman; Garkar Noma Baki I; Garkar Noma Baki II; Akasa Koko; Garkar Bagire; Koko Kawo; Yaki Da Jahilci; Makaranta Nizzamiyya; Garkar Wakili; Marina Babba
Koko/Besse	Dada/Alelu	Makaranta Dada; Yamma Dada; Gusau /T. Lalle; Jadadin Dada; Alelu
Koko/Besse	Jadadi	Jadadi Yamma; Jadadi Gabas; Jadadi Kudu; Danniki/T. Illo/T. M. Hantsi
Koko/Besse	Lani/Manyan/Tafukka/Shiba	Lani Garkar Sarki; Lani Kasuwa; Lani S/Gari; Lani Marga Yawa; Manyan Tafukka Yamma; Manyan Tafukka Gabas; Shiba/Kamfa
Koko/Besse	Besse	Rango, Gidan Baki; Rango Agadi; Kurba; Sifawa; R. Dikko Aliya; Unguwar Magaji; Unguwar Sauna; Ung. Hausawa / Makaranta; Tungar Saini; Gwarafa; T/Gayya; Tudun Bude; R/Dikko Macca
Koko/Besse	Takware	Rafin Alhaji; Tungar Magaji; Tungar Dikko; Takware; Tungar Tankari; Tungar Amadu
Koko/Besse	Dutsin Mari/Dulmeru	Dutsin Mari Gabas; Dutsin Mari Yamma; Samanaji; Buma; Nassarawa; Karwa; R. Buda Muyala I; Kalbade; Tungar Sakke; Gwargwabe; Dulmeru; Bunga; Kendawa; Taho; Dunjere; Tunga Musa; Mazoji
Koko/Besse	Zariya Kalakala/Amiru	Bessawa I; Bessawa II; Zaggawa I; Zaggawa II; Kala-Kala I; Kala-Kala II; Tungar Tuwo; Tungar Jingo; Wadata/Farfajiya; Tungar Mailyali; Tungar Alh. Modo/T. Hassan; Tungar Bombo/M/Shinkafa; Gabailo/Kabawa; T/Tune/T. Atiku
Koko/Besse	Madacci/Firini	Gwargwabe; Firini; Madacci; Gwaram; Maihako; U/Sanyi; Sakka; Tungar Boka; Tungar Habibu; Tungar Maje
Koko/Besse	Maikwari/ Karamar/ Damba/ Bakoshi	Shiyar Noma Damba; Kasuwa Nagwade; Bakoshi; Maikwari; Chegiri; Tungar Gimba; Talle; Tungar Magaji; Tungar Jatau; Amiru Garba; Dalijan; Tafkin Kanya; Tungar Waya; Ibere; Tungar Bakon Giwa
Maiyama	Andarai/ Kurunkudu/ Zugun Liba	Andarai Primary School (Andarai Kaura); Kasuwar Daji (Andarai Birni); Andari Pri. Sch. II (Andarai Magaji); Andari Pri. Sch. II (Andarai Mallamawa); Sabon Gari Pri. Sch (Sabon Gari Tunga Mamman); Ferma Office (Kwari Kwasa); Kurunkudu Pri Sch (Kurukudu Fada); Kurunkudu Arewa Dispensary (Kurun-Kudu Arewa); Kurunkudu Dispensary (Kurunkudu Bauchi); Kanaru Pri Sch (Kanaru); Arausaya Pri Sch (Arausaya Garka Hakimi); Zugun Liba Pri Sch (Zugun Liba Garka Hakimi); Zugun Liba Dispensary(Zugun Liba Shiyar Yamma)
Maiyama	Giwa Tazo/Zara	Giwatazo Pri Sch (Giwatazo Fada); Giwatazo Pri Sch (Giwatazo Ginga); Tsalibi Pri Sch (Tsalibi); Unguwar Kurya Dispensary (Unguwar Kurya Filin Kasuwa); Unguwar Kurya Pri Sch (Unguwar Kurya Garbar Alh Bala); Maitawaye Pri Sch (Maitawaye); Open Space (Gezoji Garkar Hakimi); Rafin Tofa Pri Sch (Rafin Tofa); Nikki Pri Sch (Nikki Filin Kasuwa); Giwatazo Dispensary (Giwatazo Here/Shiyar Here); Zara Birni Pri Sch (Zara Birnin Shiyar Yamma ); Zara Birni Dispensary (Zara Birni Shiyar Yamma); Zara Noma Pri Sch (Zara Noma Garkar Hakimi)
Maiyama	Gumbin Kure	Gumbin Kure Pri Sch (Gumbin Kure Fada); Gumbin Kure Pri Sch (Gumbin Kure Adarawa); Open Space (Gundun Gawa); Runfa Pri Sch (Runfa Garkar Hakii); Tsamiya Pri Sch (Tsamiya); Gumawa Pri Sch (Gumawa Garkar Hakimi); Gamjeji Pri Sch (Gamjeji Fada Garkar Hakimi); Gamjeji Pri Sch (Gamjeji Marina); Gumbin Kure Dispensary (Gumbin Kure Mafarauta)
Maiyama	Karaye/Dogondaji	Karaye Dispensary (Karaye Fada Shiyar Fada); Karaye Pri. Sch. (Karaye Masaka'a'); Karaye Pri. Sch. (Karaye Masaka'B'); J. S. S Karaye (Karaye Shiyar Dispensary); J. S. S Karaye (Karaye Yamma Dispensary); Dogon Daji Pri Sch (Dogon Daji Fada); Dogon Daji Pri. Sch. (Dogon Daji Shiyar Gabas); Mdgs Clinic (Dogon Daji Dogon Daji Filin Kasuwa); Dogondaji Old Dispensary (Dogondaji Gabas Garkar Alh; Duhuwa Pri Sch (Duhuwa Garkar Wakali); Duhuwa Dispensary (Duhuwa Shiyar Yamma); Tunga Pri. Sch. (Tungar Gharkar Hakimi); Karaye Pri. Sch.(Karaye Yamma Garkar Tsoho)
Maiyama	Kawara/S/Sara/Yarkamba	Kawara Pri. Sch. (Kawara Fada); Kawara Pri. Sch. (Kawara Garkar Galadima 'A')); Kawara Pri. Sch. (Kawara Garkar Galadima 'B'); Kawara Dispensary (Kawara Shiyar Liman); Open Space (Tungar Yahuza Nassarawa); Majidi Pri. Sch. (Majidi Fada); Ruwan Fili Pri. Sch. II (Ruwan Fili (Garkar Hahinu); Ruwan Fili Pri. Sch. I (Ruwan Fili (Shiyar Attah); Ruwan Fili Pri. Sch. I ( Ruwan Fili Pri Sch); Yar Kamba Pri. School (Yar Kamba Garkar Hakimi); Yarkamba Dispensary (Yar Kamba Gidan Baki); Sabon Sara Dispensary (Sabon Sara Garkar Hakimi); Sabon Sara Pri. Sch. (Sabon Sara Garkar Alh Audu M); Sabon Sara Pri Sch (Sabon Sara Garkar Alh Sani)
Maiyama	Kuberi / Gidiga	Gidiga Pri. Sch. (Gidiga Fada); Gidiga Pri. Sch. (Gidiga Shiyar Idi); Unguwar Sanda Pri. Sch. (Unguwar Sanda); Kuberi Pri. Sch. (Kuberi Marina); Kuberi Dispensary ( Kuberi Garkar Hakimi); Rafin Nagindi Pri. Sch. (Rafin Nagindi Kasuwa); Rafin Nagindi Dispensary (Rafin Nagindi Marina); Gidiga Dispensary ( Gidiga Wolawa)
Maiyama	Liba/Danwa/Kuka Kogo	Liba Dispensary (Liba Fada Filin Kasuwa ); Kwatalo Pri. Sch. (Kwatalo Garkar Hakimi); Kwatalo Dispensary (Kwatalo Filin Kasuwa); Rura Fada Dispensary (Rural Fada Garkar Hakimi); Aida Mdgs Dispensary (Aida Fada Filin Kasuwa); Magwarada Pri. Sch. (Magwarada Garkar Hakimi); Aida Primary School (Aida Marke); Danyen Gari Pri. School (Danyen Gari Makera); Kuka Kogo Pri. School (Kuka Kogo Shiyar Fada); Yar Jega Pri School (Yar Jega Garkar Hakimi); Jargaba Pri. School (Jar Gaba Filin Kasuwa); Maisheka Dispensary (Maisheka); Danwa Pri. Sch. (Danwa Fada Garkar Rafi); Danwa Dispensary (Danwa Garkar Idi Magaji); Open Space (Tungar Magaji Garkar Liman); Open Space (Tsatsumbai Garkar Hakimi); Liba Pri School (Liba Garkar Auwal)
Maiyama	Maiyama	Maiyama Model Pri. Sch. (Maiyama Fada 'A' Garkar Liman); Maiyama Model Pri. Sch. (Maiyama Fada 'B' Garkar Dangaladima); Maiyama Model Pri. Sch. (Maiyama Filin Kuntum 'A'); Maiyama Model Pri. Sch. (Maiyama Filin Kuntum 'B'); Maiyama Gra Sss Office (Maiyama Marina); Maiyama Tudun Zarumai Pri. Sch. (Maiyama Garkar Alh Haruna Jada); Maiyama Tudun Zarumai Pri. Sch. (Maiyama Kaura Makerar Dan Kakale); G. D. S. S Maiyama (Maiyama Kasuwar Kuli-Kuli)
Maiyama	Mungadi/Botoro	Mungadi Pri. Sch. (Mungadi Birni 'A'); Mungadi Dispensary (Mungadi Birni 'B'); Mungadi Pri. Sch. (Mungadi Rinaye); Mungadi Kasuwar Daji (Mungadi Kaura 'A'); Mungadi Pri. Sch. II (Mungadi Unguwar Fulani); Mungadi Kasuwar Dajio (Mungadi Kaura 'B'); Mungadi Mdgs Clinic (Mungadi Garkar Dandane 'A'); Mungadi Mdgs Clinic (Mungadi Garkar Dandane 'B'); Gyasuwa Pri. Sch. (Gyasuwa Garkar Hakimi); Botoro Pri. Sch. (Botoro Kaura 'A'); Botoro Pri. Sch. (Botoro Kaura 'B')
Maiyama	Sambawa/Mayalo	Sambawa Pri. Sch. (Sambawa Fada); Sambawa Pri. Sch. (Sambawa Kaura 'A'); Sambawa Old Dispensary (Sambawa Kaura 'B'); Sambawa Area Court (Sambawa Jargaba); Kangiwa Pri. Sch. (Kangiwa Garkar Hakimi); Unguwar Shuaibu Pri. Sch. (Unguwar Shuaibu); Unguwar Auta Pri. Sch. (Unguwar Auta); Unguwar Abu Dispensary ( Unguwar Abu); Mayalo Dispensary (Mayalo Fada Shiyar Fada); Mayalo Dispensary (Mayalo Fada 'A'); Mayalo Primary Sch. (Mayalo Shiyar Magaji); Wawa Karasa Pri. Sch. ( Wawa Kasara); Open Space (Badariya Garkar Hakimi)
Maiyama	Sarandosa/Gubba	Sarandosa Pri. Sch. (Sarandosa Garkar Hakimi); Sarandosa Dispensary (Sarandosa Shiyar Gabas); Sarandosa Pri. Sch. (Sarandosa Garkar Mal. Muazu); Gubba Dispensary (Gubba Garkar Hakimi); Gubba Pri. Sch. (Gubba Filin Kasuwa); Achikaratu Dodo Primary Sch. ( Achikaratu Dodo Garkar Hakimi); Achikaratu Yahaya Pri. Sch. (Achikaratu Yahaya Garkar Hakimi); Achikaratu Dodo Primary Sch. ( Achikaratu Uban Dawaki Garkar Hakimi); Hulkui Dispensary (Hulkuli Garkar Hakimi); Rafin Guzuma Pri. Sch. (Rafin Guzuma Garkar Halimi); Open Space (Sabon Gari Garkar Hakimi)
Ngaski	Birnin Yauri	Bambiri; Birni Yauri \A\'; Birnin Yauri 'B'; Birnin Yauri 'C' / F / Jirgi; Kimo; Karagashi; Kamfanin Waya; Kwanano; Laka; Tungar Gazau; Ung. Sharifai
Ngaski	Gafara Machupa	Bakin Ruwa; Wawu Dantamungadi; Gafara 'A'; Gafara 'B'; Gidan Kwano; Kyandawa; Wawu Jaji; Lopa; Masamale; Ntade; Raishe
Ngaski	Garin Baka/Makarin	Makirin; Gwarzo; Garin Baka; Rikwafe; Ung. Boka
Ngaski	Kwakwaran	Chupamini 'A'; Bakari; Gunguntagwaye; Langwan; Rai She; Tungar Maikwalanshe
Ngaski	Libata/Kwangia	Kabirba; Kochoro; Kwanga Primary School; Libata Primary School 'A'; Libata Pri. Sch. 'B'; Ung. Galadima 'A'; Ung. Galadima 'B'; Yalawa; Tungar Idi; Lokon Uba
Ngaski	Kambuwa/Danmaraya	Dammaraya; Gidan Kazuwo; Kumbuwa; Kwaliyo; Sakaba; Shagiya; Tungar Bature; Tungar Kolo; Tungar Uwar Yara
Ngaski	Makawa Uleira	Guguwa; Gungun Masu; Ung. Gunguwa; Ung. Hakimi; Makaranta; Ung. Makwashi; Ung. Alh. Monde
Ngaski	Ngaski	Gidan Daya; Kinkya; Makurdi; Ngaski Garkar Hakimi; Ngaski Makaranta; Ngaski Marina; Ngaski Sabon Gari
Ngaski	Utono/Hoge	Hoge; Gidan Nda; Tungar Leda; Gidan Salai; Utuno Makaranta; Gidan Aguya Wata
Ngaski	Wara	Ung. Sarkin Alaru; Ung. Sarkin Makada; Ung. Malam Hassan 'A' /'B'; Ung. Alkali Haruna; Tungar Mai Ruwa; Wara Model Primary School 'A'; Wara Model Primary School 'B'; Ung. Sarkin Wara; Ung. Sarkawa; Yadi Model Primary School
Sakaba	Adai	Tsohon Birnin Primary School (Unguwar Maganda); Maganda Primary School (Garkar Maganda); Mae'E Primary School (Maee); Tungar Gwamna Primary School (Tungar Gwamna); Kurmin Hodo Primary School (Kurmin Hodo Mahuta); Pampama Primary School (Pampama Kwagwani); Marando Open Space (Marando); Maga Primary School (Maga/Abagai); Mahuta Primary School (Mahuta); Maganda Dispensary (Maganda)
Sakaba	Dankolo	Dankolo Primary School ?A (Dankolo Primary School ); Ung. Open Space (Ung. Wade); Unguwar Chitau Open Space (Unguwar Chitau); Daura Primary School (Daura); Jadamo Primary School (Garkar Jandamo); Agale Primary School (Agale); G. Mesa Open Space (Garkar Mesa); Dankolo Primary School ?B (Dankolo Primary School )
Sakaba	Doka/Bere	Doka Primary School (Doka); Ung. Manga Primary School (Ung. Manga); Rukukuji Primary School (Rukurkuji); Mari Primary School (Garkar Mari); Open Space (Garkar Gujiya); Tungan Bere Bindi (Tungan Bere Dindi); Bere Primary School (Bere)
Sakaba	Gelwasa	Gelwasa Primary School (Gelwasa); Ung. Ajiya Primary School (Ung, Ajiya); Dutsen Biri Primary School (Dutsen Biri); Unguwar Nabite (Unguwar Nabije); Ung. Yamma; Tudun Wada (Tudun Waba)
Sakaba	Janbirni	Janbirni Primary School (Janbirni); Laraba Primary School (Laraba); Kwagwano Primary School (Kwagwano); Gwanja Primary School (Gwanja); Ung. Gishiri Primary School (Ung. Gishiri); Sangangan Primary School (Sanganga); Wangachi Primary School (Wangachi)
Sakaba	Maza/Maza	Sikoka Primary School (Sikoka); Maza Maza Primary School (Maza Maza); Ung. Bayo Dispensary (Ung. Bayo); Ung. Wanahe Primary School (Ung. Wanahe); Dunhu Baidu Primary School (Dunhu Baidu); Jonga Primary School (Jonga)
Sakaba	Makuku	Makuku Primary School (Makuku); Ikobi/Bondo Primary School (Ikobi/Bondo); Dokan Kambari Primary School (Dokan Kambari); Jan Dutse Primary School (Jan Dutse); Babura Primary School (Babura); Usara (Usala); Open Space (Shadadi); Malolo Primary School (Malolo)
Sakaba	Sakaba	Sakaba Primary School (Mararraban Dankolo); Mazarko Primary School (Mazalko); Kadanho Primary School (Kadanho); Tikawa Primary School (Tikawa); Open Space (Katuntun); Ung. Dispensary (Ung. Zama); Bazama Primary School (Bazama); Open Space (Ung. Madi)
Sakaba	Tudun Kuka	Nashiya Primary School (Nashiya); Open Space (Tudun Kuka); Open Space (Ung. Maidamma); Linzamiyya Primary School (Dan Maje); Open Space (Ung. Fada); Open Space (Ung. Sari); Islamiyya Primary School (Ung. Namadina); Nashiya Primary School (Garkar Liman); Open Space (Yanturmi)
Shanga	Atuwo	Atuwo Primary School (Marina'a' G/Hakimi); Dispensary Atuwo (Marina'B' G/Noma); Open Space (Dandije G/Hakimi); Open Space (Dikko Gajere G/Hakimi); Primary School Kyastu (Kyastu 'A' G/Hakimi); Dispensary Kyastu (Kyastu 'B' G/Hakimi); Primary School Kisira (Kisira G/Hakimi); Primary School Likwa (Likwa G/Hakimi)
Shanga	Binuwa/Gebbe/Bukunji	Atuwo Primary School (Marina'a' G/Hakimi); Dispensary Atuwo (Marina'B' G/Noma); Open Space (Dandije G/Hakimi); Open Space (Dikko Gajere G/Hakimi); Primary School Kyastu (Kyastu 'A' G/Hakimi); Dispensary Kyastu (Kyastu 'B' G/Hakimi); Primary School Kisira (Kisira G/Hakimi); Primary School Likwa (Likwa G/Hakimi)
Shanga	Dugu Tsoho/Dugu Raha	Atuwo Primary School (Marina'a' G/Hakimi); Dispensary Atuwo (Marina'B' G/Noma); Open Space (Dandije G/Hakimi); Open Space (Dikko Gajere G/Hakimi); Primary School Kyastu (Kyastu 'A' G/Hakimi); Dispensary Kyastu (Kyastu 'B' G/Hakimi); Primary School Kisira (Kisira G/Hakimi); Primary School Likwa (Likwa G/Hakimi)
Shanga	Kawara/Ingu/Sargo	Atuwo Primary School (Marina'a' G/Hakimi); Dispensary Atuwo (Marina'B' G/Noma); Open Space (Dandije G/Hakimi); Open Space (Dikko Gajere G/Hakimi); Primary School Kyastu (Kyastu 'A' G/Hakimi); Dispensary Kyastu (Kyastu 'B' G/Hakimi); Primary School Kisira (Kisira G/Hakimi); Primary School Likwa (Likwa G/Hakimi)
Shanga	Rafin Kirya/Tafki Tara	Atuwo Primary School (Marina'a' G/Hakimi); Dispensary Atuwo (Marina'B' G/Noma); Open Space (Dandije G/Hakimi); Open Space (Dikko Gajere G/Hakimi); Primary School Kyastu (Kyastu 'A' G/Hakimi); Dispensary Kyastu (Kyastu 'B' G/Hakimi); Primary School Kisira (Kisira G/Hakimi); Primary School Likwa (Likwa G/Hakimi)
Shanga	Sakace/Golongo/Hundeji	Atuwo Primary School (Marina'a' G/Hakimi); Dispensary Atuwo (Marina'B' G/Noma); Open Space (Dandije G/Hakimi); Open Space (Dikko Gajere G/Hakimi); Primary School Kyastu (Kyastu 'A' G/Hakimi); Dispensary Kyastu (Kyastu 'B' G/Hakimi); Primary School Kisira (Kisira G/Hakimi); Primary School Likwa (Likwa G/Hakimi)
Shanga	Sawashi	Atuwo Primary School (Marina'a' G/Hakimi); Dispensary Atuwo (Marina'B' G/Noma); Open Space (Dandije G/Hakimi); Open Space (Dikko Gajere G/Hakimi); Primary School Kyastu (Kyastu 'A' G/Hakimi); Dispensary Kyastu (Kyastu 'B' G/Hakimi); Primary School Kisira (Kisira G/Hakimi); Primary School Likwa (Likwa G/Hakimi)
Shanga	Shanga	Atuwo Primary School (Marina'a' G/Hakimi); Dispensary Atuwo (Marina'B' G/Noma); Open Space (Dandije G/Hakimi); Open Space (Dikko Gajere G/Hakimi); Primary School Kyastu (Kyastu 'A' G/Hakimi); Dispensary Kyastu (Kyastu 'B' G/Hakimi); Primary School Kisira (Kisira G/Hakimi); Primary School Likwa (Likwa G/Hakimi)
Shanga	Yarbesse	Primary School Balewa (Belawa G/Hakimi); Primary School Hori Gari (Hori Gari G/Hakimi); Primary School Yarbesse (G/Hakimi Yarbesse 'A'); Dispensary Yarbesse (Yarbesse Ung. Magaji ); Zugun Tane Open Space (Zugutare G/Hakimi)
Suru	Aljannare	Veterinary Clinic (Aljannare K/Fada); Aljannare Makaranta; Tsohon Filin Bagabadi (G/Hakimi Bagaba); Bagoni Primary School (Bagoni G/Hakimi); Filin Ciwa (Ciwa G/Hakimi); Juroki Primary School (Juroki); Kabe Primary School (G/Hakimi Kabe); Nasarawa Primary School (G/Hakimi Nasarawa); Sulguru Primary School (G/Hakimi Sulguru); Tsohon Fili Tankwasare (G/Hakimi Takwas); T/Audu Primary School (T/Audu Bazamarme); T/Alhaji Primary School (G/Hakimi Alhaji); T/Gero Primary School (G/Hakimi T/Gero); T/Hakimi Ibrahim Primary School (G/Hakimi Ibrahim); T/Abdulmumini Primary School (T/Abdulmumini); K/Fana Primary School (K/Fana Aljannare); K/Fana Primary School (K/Fana ); Aljannare Kofar Fana
Suru	Bandan	Makaranta Bandan (G/Hakimi); Baandan Primary School (K/Fada); Barbarejon Primary School (Barbarejon Bandan); Dolen Bandan Primary School (G/Hakimi); T/Dolenkwandage Primary School (G/Hakimi); Gawasa Bandan Primary School (G/Hakimi); G S S Tindifai (Kala Tindifai); Matankari Primary School (G/Hakimi); Saka Primary School (G/Hakimi); Tinfidai Primary School (G/Hakimi); D/Fili Wabbaku (G/Hakimi); Zakuwa Clinic (Asibiti); T/Malam Primary School (G/Hakimi); Tungar Malan G/Hakimi
Suru	Barbarejo	Barbarejo Makaranta; Bilibili Kasuwa (Bilibili Fili); Fana Sabo Primary School (Dalla Magawata); Sabo Primary School (G/Hakimi); Gimba Primary School (G/Hakimi); Masama Primary School (G/Hakimi); Sire Primary Schoolg (G/Hakimi); T/Arawa Primary School (G/Hakimi); T/Gawo Primary School (G/Hakimi); T/Idrisu Primary School (G/Hakimi); T/Lanta Fili Primary School (Lanta Fili); Wadata Primary School (G/Hakimi); D/Fili Zugun Basu (G/Hakimi)
Suru	Bakuwai	Bakoshi Makaranta; Filin Kasuwa Golgolure (Golgolure Fili); Kainiki Primary School (G/Hakimi Kainiki); Keji Makaranta; Filin Kasuwa Kunboru (G/Hakimi Kumboru); Kwakware Primary School (D/Fili Kwakware); Kwakware Primary School (G/Sarki Kwandage); Matankare Primary School (G/Sarki Matankare); Taka Lafiya Primary School (G/Hakimi Salmateji); Taka Lafiya Primary School (G/Sarki Taka Lafiya); Filin Kasuwa (S/Amiru Taka); D/Fili T/Borai (G/Hakimi T/Borai); Yarma Primary School (G/Hakimi Yarma); Bakuwai Makaranta G/Wakili
Suru	Dakingari	Dakin Gari Kasuwa; Bendu Makaranta; Model Primary School; Reading Room; Kigo Annex P/S (G/Daneri); D/Filin Kokani Jigara Tiya (G/Kokani); P/Health Centre D/Gari (G/Sauna); D/Filin M/Garu (G/Hakimi); Filin Makera (Makera Wakili); Noma Primary School D/Gari Noma Pr. Sch.; Sabon Gari Primary School D/G Sab./G Pr. Sch; Model Primary School D/Gari
Suru	Dandane	Dandane Makaranta; Hore G / Maidutse; Hore Makaranta; Dan Filin Kasuwa Hore (Hore G. S Aski); Lafiya G/Hakimi; Maikwari Makaranta; Tungar Gero G/Hakimi; Dan Fili T/Kaji (G/Hakimi); Wuro-Gauri Makaranta; Filin Kasuwa Tungar Magajiya (G/Hakimi)
Suru	Daniya/Shema	Daniya Makaranta; Dan Filin Kasuwa Kwarmisa (G/Hakimi); Lehura G/Hakimi; Dan Filin Kasuwa Maboru (G/Hakimi); Shema Makaranta; Tani-Kwara G/Hakimi; Zugun Maimaro Z. Maimaro Fili
Suru	Ginga	Dutse Primary School (G/Hakimi); Dan Fili Gege (G/Hakimi); Ginga G/Hakimi; Fanadi Fanadi Fili; Dan Fili Kasuwar Kukar (G/Hakimi); Sangelu G/Hakimi; Sangelu Makaranta
Suru	Giro	Dan Fili Danbe Alsuru (Alsuru G/Hakimi); Fala Makaranta; Old Clinic Giro (G/Sarki); Giro G/Yamma; Gobiraje G/Hakimi; Gware G/Hakimi; Dan Fili Laba Kasuwa (G/Hakimi Laba); Tungar Nagwamba T. Nagwamba Fili; Clinic . S. Ruwa (G/Hakimi); Giro Makaranta
Suru	Kwaifa	Buma G/Hakimi; Dandawa G/Sarki; Garin Gungu G/Hakimi; Gungun Garjaga Garjaga Fili; Gungun Taura G/Hakimi; Garkar Sarki (Kwaifa); Kwaifa Makaranta; Matankarin Giro G/Hakimi; T/Dandare G/Hakimi; Tsuntsaye Tsuntsaye Fili
Suru	Suru	Bakele G/Hakimi; Bomare G/Hakimi; Gwafadi Sabongari G/Hakimi; Gwafadi Tsohuwa G/Hakimi Tsoh/Fili; Illela G/Hakimi; Katu Makaranta; Kankure G/Hakimi; Kawara G/Sarki; Kawara Makaranta; Suru Filin Anta Filin Anta; Suru Filin Lamido - Filin Lamido; Suru Kasuwa Gari; Suru Makaranta; Shiwaka Makaranta; Talata G/Hakimi; Tungar Manu Bahjo G/Hakimi; Tungar Malam G/Hakimi; Tungar Naini G/Hakimi; Suru Filin Lamido
Wasagu/Danko	Bena	Unguwar Marafa; Tudun Wada; Model Primary School (Gangare); Sabon Gari Bena; Rawaiya Open Space (Rawaiya); Bakin Kasuwa; K/Dan Sallau Open Space(K/ Dan Sallau) (K/Dan Sallah Open Space (K/ Dan Sallau)); Fada; Dan Ayi; Malekachi; Danrimi; Town Dispensary (Sabon Gari 'A'); Sabon Gari 'B'
Wasagu/Danko	Dan Umaru/Mairairai	Unguwar Kolo; Tumburku; Danumaru Yamma; Marahen Kasa; Primary School (Dan Makarwa) (Primary School (Dan Makwarwa)); Musuru; Tunburku Gangire; D/Umaru Na Shigifa; Shadadi; Asibit Danmutari (Danmutari); Yar Maitaba; Town Dispensary Mairairai (Mairairai); Ramuna
Wasagu/Danko	Danko/Maga	Taro Gari; Gidan Danguntu; Ung. Magaji 'A'; Ung. Magaji 'B'; Isgen; Masama; Muni Primary School (Danko Yamma); Maga Fada; Zaima; Garin Hausawa; Danko Fada A.; Danko Fada 'B' Primary School (Danko Fada 'B'); Ilbo
Wasagu/Danko	Kyabu/Kandu	Gidin Iccen Mangoro Open Space(Runtuwa Huranga) (Gidin Iccen Mangoro Open Space (Runtowa Huranga)); Primary School Same (Same); Tungan Banre; Makaranta G. Gomo; Asibiti D'Kenke (D'Kenke); Mashigi; Madattai; Primary School Kandu Karkara (Kandu Karkara); K/Zarbu; Gidan Iccen Baure Open Space (Gidan Mai Ido) (Gidin Iccen Baure Open Space (Tungar Mai Do)); Asibiti Kuntomo (Kuntomo)
Wasagu/Danko	Ribah/Machika	Ung. Wele; Primary School (Dungu) (Primary School (Wungu)); Makaranta Ribah A; Makaranta Ribah B; Civil Defence Office Kasuwa Awala Pompo (Kasuwa Awala Pompo); Yar Ali; Awala Asibiti 'A'; Awala Asibiti 'B'; Erga Primary School (Erga); Primary School Masallachi Village (Masallachi Village); Open Space Duhu (Duhu); Sabon Gari; Tungar Dorawa; Open Space Manga (Manga); Machika Primary School (Machika); Makwafa; Kawon Baga; Riba Fada; Mangorori Open Space (Wastange) (Mangorori Open Space(Wase Tange))
Wasagu/Danko	Waje	Dokar Kwaya Primary School (Kasuwa Open Space Dokar Kwaya); K' Dabo Galadima; Tungar Yababa; Primary School (D?Gwengwe) (Primary School (Degwengwe)); Senior Secondary School Shengel (Shengel 'A'); Shengel 'B'; Ragam; Yarbuga; Warkata; Tungan Gaya Primary School (Tungan Gaya); Zagami; Primary School (Saki) (Primary School (Tsaki)); Durun Kurungu; Turamen Kyado; Dankade; Open Space T'Bakaya Morai (T'Bakaya Morai); Kurku; Wadako; Unashi I; Unashi; Yar Knka; Nizamiyya Primary School Waje (Waje); Zuttun Kolo Primary School (Zuttun Kolo)
Wasagu/Danko	Wasagu	Tudun Bichi 'A'; Tudun Bichi 'B'; Fada; Ung. Liman Sirajo; Madami A; Sabon Gari Yamma; Unity Bank Upper Court Audu Sarkin Kudi (Audu Sarkin Kudi 'A'); Open Space Sabuwar Tunga (Sabuwar Tunga); Sabon Garin Gabas; Ung. Ummaruje A; Ung. Ummaruje B; Kurmachi Primary School (Kurmachi); Gandu Dan-Goggo
Wasagu/Danko	Yalmo/Shindi	Gidan Yalmo; Gangaren Shindi; Gidan Wari; Dan Bangane; Open Space Kampani Gawo (Kampani Gawo); Donka; Rijiyar Froma; Gidan Shindi
Wasagu/Danko	Gwanfi/Kele	Gidan Rane; Illabre; Kapsapi; Gidan Suya; Gangaren Yele; Isrange Primary School (Israngi); Berberu Primary School (Berberu); Tungan Bizo I; Tungan Bizo II; Ukuhu
Yauri	Chulu/Koma	Koma Makaranta; Tunga Alh. Sani; Ung. Bakin Ruwa; Tungan Makeri; Gungun Yarimawa; Chulu G/Hakimi; Chulu G/Noma Sule; Yita Village
Yauri	Gungun Sarki	Hikiya; Kofar Maginga; Baha G/Hakimi; Rukubalo Primary School; Himambiro G/Hakimi Isyaka 'A'; Hinambiro G/Hakimi 'B'; Baha Primary School; Rukubalo G/Hakimi
Yauri	Jijima	Kangungu Jijima; Jijima Faransawa; Tungan Maishagali; Ung. Kuka; Jijima Sarki; Bariki; Utsun; T/Noma/T/Rogo
Yauri	Tondi	Tondi Makaranta Hilala; Tondi Makaranta Ggsc; Tillo Bunzawa; Tsohon Tondi; Hili Kula; Hela/Yabon Ruwa/Uhun 'A'; Rofia/Ikum; Tondi Gada/Gusau; Gungun Sakace/Tsawa; Hela / Yabour Runan / Uhun 'B'
Yauri	Yelwa Central	Shagon Goro; Sabon Gari Primary School; Garkar Malam Tsoho; Garkar Alh. Danladi; Garkar Alh. Kane; Garkar Magatakarda; Garkar Sarki; Palace Primary School 'A'; Palace Primary School B
Yauri	Yelwa East	Gankar Alh. Maigandi; Wali Primary School 'A'; Wali Primary School 'B'; Garkar Mal. Na Faransi; Garkan Sa'adu Mai Kwano; G/S. T.; Nysc Zonal Office; G/M Nabakabe
Yauri	Yelwa North	Waje Primary School 'A'; T/Bindiga; Hutawa Primary School; Workshop; Prison Yard; G/Noma; G/Alh. Anaruwa; Ung. Kabo; Ung Sarkawa
Yauri	Yelwa South	Garkar Yan Tawaye; Garkar Basiru; G/Alh. Maibariki 'A'; G/Alh. Maibariki 'B'; G/Sarkin Alaru; G/Alh - Manu; G/Wali; G/M Na Annabi; Tsohuwar Tasha; G/Yar Yauri
Yauri	Yelwa West	Garkan Sarkin Pawa Jido; G/Alh. Salele Tela; Zango Primary School; Gidan Habibu Bala; Gidan Audu Tilliti; Tsamiyar Cinema; G/Tunde Bayarbe
Yauri	Zamare	Zamare Primary School; Zamare Alh. Kuta; Barishi; Alh. Sharru Jalbabu; G/Haruna Dogoji; Ung. Damisa 'A'; Garkar Yahaya Ukangala; Kangungu Zamare; Hibirabu Primary School
Zuru	Bedi	Bedi Fada 'A'; Ung. Pansi Ubandawaki; Ung. Joji; Ung. S/Fawa; Ung. G/Tambari; Ung. Gara; Kwanci Manga; Somdaro; Gamji Dako; Domo Yumu; Zagderi; Bedi Pada B
Zuru	Ciroman Dabai	Dabai Fada; Sabon G/Dabari; Umama Musa 'A'; Umana Musa; B/Galadima; Resge Dumbi; Ung. M. Margishi; Kwendu; Ung. S/Uban Dawaki; Banto Wuya
Zuru	Isgogo /Dago	Isgogo Fada; Karkara Dago; Ung. Galadima; Jambo; Zangina
Zuru	Manga/Ushe	Amanawa Primary School; Ung. Bawa D/Gujiya 'A'; Ung. Bawa D/Gudiya 'B'; Elembelu; Ung. Gujiya Magaji; Madugu; Magoro; Ung. Manga; Rio; Ung. S/Dutse; Ung. Duste Ushe
Zuru	Rafin Zuru	G/Audu Bena; G/Baki; G/Damaturu; G/S/Mai Doya; G/Tukur; G/Alh Budo; Sami Gomo Primary School 'A'; Sami Gomo Primary School 'B'; Danga Gomo Primary School; Emirs Palace; Tashar Rimi; Garkar Rafin Zuru A; G. B. O. 'A'; G. B. O.; G. R. A.; Old Zie; Dambo Gomo; Zango Langare
Zuru	Rikoto	G/Kirso; G/S/Bunu 'A'; G/S/Bunu; Tudun Wada P. S. (G/R. S Maidawa); G/S/Rikoto; S/G/Rikoto Primary School; Twins Quarters; Vet. Clinic; Tungar Doro
Zuru	Rumu/Daben/Seme	Daban Seme Fada; Rumu Fada; S/Dutse Primary School; Delembo; Ung/Ukwari; Deherge; Uzogu
Zuru	Senchi	Gamji Primary School 'A'; Senchi Primary School; T/Bahago; T/Kibiya; T/Rimi; Ung. Dudu; Ung. Dudu Ritti; Ung/Kudun Galadima; Ung. Kwali Dandareso
Zuru	Tadurga	Bere Ung. Kudu; Jikka; Maikaho; Rafin Gomo; T/Dutse; Tadurga Fada; Ung. Hausawa; T/Gulbi
Zuru	Zodi	Bogu Makera; Dekeinbe/Digago; Gada/Ubandawaki; Gomawa; Gobo Tambari; Keri Dogo Lokomo; Marafa Gudu; Rafi Hitta; Salama Guragori; Kwarginla; Zodi
