= Bena, Nigeria =

Bena
- Village
- Location in Nigeria
- Coordinates: 11°17′12″N 5°56′36″E
- Country: Nigeria
- State: Kebbi
- LGA: Wasagu/Danko

Area
  - Total: 3.92 km^{2} (1.51 sq mi)
- Elevation: 555 m (1,821 ft)

Population (2018)
  - Total: 8,361
  - Density: 2,130/km^{2} (5,520/sq mi)
- Time zone: UTC+1 (WAT)
- Postal code: 872104

Bena is a village in northwestern Nigeria. Bena has a tropical savanna Köppen climate classification and an area of 3.92 square kilometres, which includes a large market, a medical center, a bakery and a supermarket.
