= Stamatis Benas =

Greek professional basketball player

Stamatis Benas Σταμάτης Μπένας
Eleftheroupoli
- Position: Power forward / center
- League: Greek A2 League

Personal information
- Born: October 14, 1985 (age 41) Thessaloniki, Greece
- Listed height: 2.06 m (6 ft 9 in)

Career information
- Playing career: 2007–present

Career history
- 2007–2010: MENT
- 2010–2014: KAOD
- 2014–2015: Ermis Lagkada
- 2015–2016: Iraklis Thessaloniki
- 2016–2018: Kastorias
- 2018–2019: Iraklis
- 2019–present: Eleftheroupoli

Career highlights
- Greek 2nd Division champion (2011)

Stamatis Benas (alternate spelling: Mpenas) (Greek: Σταμάτης Μπένας, Greek pronunciation: [sta'matis 'benas]; born October 14, 1985) is a Greek professional basketball player. Benas has spent his entire career in the Greek leagues. He has represented Greece at youth level.

== Professional career ==
Benas started playing basketball at the ranks of Aris Thessaloniki. At the senior level he began playing basketball for Galaxias Adendro, an amateur team. He started playing professionally in 2007 when he joined MENT of the Greek A2 League. In 2010 he moved to KAOD, gaining promotion to the Greek Basket League in 2011. He played for three seasons in the top tier of Greek basketball, in which he appeared in 57 games averaging 2.3 points and 1.5 rebounds per game. On 7 August 2014 Benas signed for Ermis Lagkada in the Greek A2 League. In July 2015 he joined Iraklis Thessaloniki. After one season with Iraklis he signed for third-tier team Kastorias.

== International career ==
Benas has represented Greece at the youth levels. He appeared in 8 games averaging 4.1 points per game. Mpenas was a member of Greece's squad for the 2004 FIBA Europe Under-18 Championship.
