= 2016 Montenegrin coup attempt allegations =

2016 alleged Russian-backed coup d'état plot in Montenegro

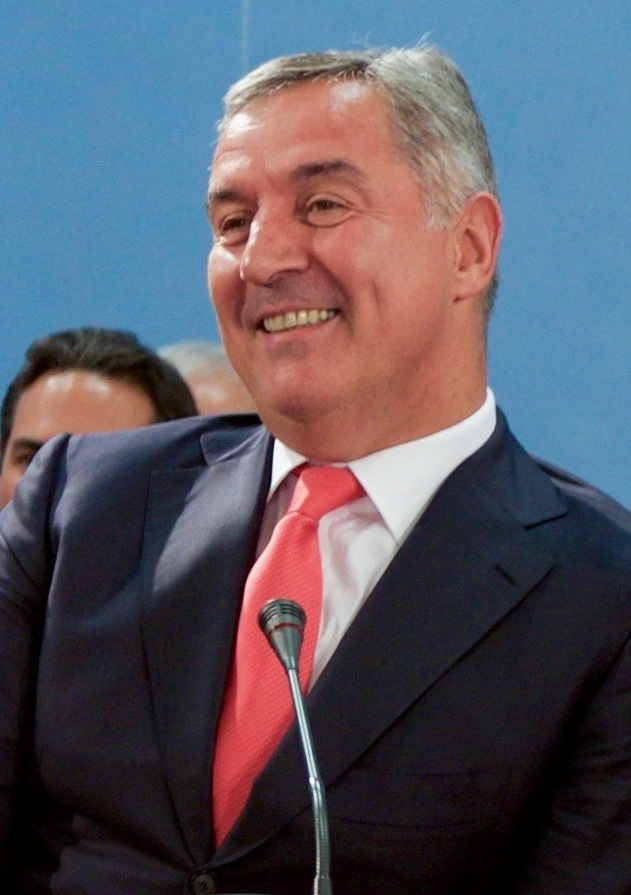
President Milo Đukanović, whose DPS ruled the country for three decades, established a hybrid regime through alleged strongman tactics. Here, he is pictured after signing Montenegro's NATO accession protocol.

A coup d'état in the capital of Montenegro, Podgorica, was allegedly planned and prepared for 16 October 2016, the day of the parliamentary election, according to Montenegro's special prosecutor. In September 2017, the trial of those indicted in connection with the alleged plot began in the High Court in Podgorica. The indictees including leaders of the Montenegrin opposition and two alleged Russian intelligence agents. Russian government officials denied any involvement. In 2019, the Higher Court found the accused guilty of plotting to commit "terrorist acts" and "(undermining) the constitutional order of Montenegro", sentencing 13 people. In February 2021, the appellate court annulled the verdict on all counts of the indictment. The acquittals were upheld on appeal in July 2024. The Special State Prosecutor's Office (SDT) then appealed the acquittal in June 2025, and the appeal was dismissed in February 2026, ending the decade-old saga.

== Background ==
It was claimed by the Montenegrin Government that the plot was designed as a last-ditch attempt by the Montenegrin pro-Serbian and pro-Russian opposition to prevent Montenegro's accession to NATO, a move stridently opposed by Russia's government that had allegedly issued threats to Montenegro concerning such eventuality. However, the opposition alleged that the accusations were political in nature and instead a last-ditch attempt by the Government to prevent its potential loss in the election.

== Arrests and alleged plot ==
16 October 2016 arrests
- Planned by: Ministry of Interior Affairs
- Objective: Capture alleged coup conspirators
- Date: 16 October 2016
- Executed by: Law enforcement
- Outcome: 20 arrests

On the eve of 16 October 2016, the day of the parliamentary election in Montenegro, a group of 20 Serbian and Montenegrin citizens, including the former head of Serbian Gendarmery Bratislav Dikić, were arrested; some of them, along with other persons, including two Russian citizens, were later formally charged by the authorities of Montenegro with an attempted coup d'état. In early November 2016, Montenegro's special prosecutor for organised crime and corruption, Milivoje Katnić, alleged that "a powerful organisation" that comprised about 500 people from Russia, Serbia and Montenegro was behind the coup plot. In February 2017, Montenegrin officials accused the Russian 'state structures' of being behind the attempted coup, which allegedly envisaged an attack on the country's parliament and assassination of prime minister Milo Đukanović.

The details about the coup plot were first made public at the end of October 2016 by Serbia's prime minister Aleksandar Vučić, whose public statement on the matter stressed the role of Serbia's law enforcers, especially the Serbian Security Intelligence Agency, in thwarting it. The statement was immediately followed by an unscheduled visit to Belgrade by Nikolai Patrushev, secretary of Russia's Security Council.

According to the prime minister Duško Marković′s statements made in February 2017, the government received definitive information about the coup being prepared on 12 October 2016, when a person involved in the plot gave away the fallback scenario of his Russian minders; this information was also corroborated by the security services of NATO member countries, who helped the Montenegrin government to investigate the plot. One of the charged, Predrag Bogićević from Kragujevac, a veteran and leader of the Ravna Gora Movement, said that Saša Sinđelić informed him on a possible attack on Serbs who participated in the October 16th protest. Bogićević, in Serbian detention, said through his lawyer that there was no talks whatsoever on a coup and no mentions of Đukanović.

The Moscow–based Russian Institute for Strategic Studies (RISS), which has close ties to Russian Foreign Intelligence Service (SVR), was mentioned by mass media as one of the organisations involved in devising the coup plot; in early November 2017, Russian president Vladimir Putin sacked the RISS director, Leonid P. Reshetnikov, a ranking veteran officer of the SVR.

=== Persons alleged to be involved ===
- (Russia) Eduard Shishmakov, (Note: Originally presented as "Eduard Shirokov", by Montenegro's special prosecutor Katnić and his office.) GRU, conspirator, not extradited
- (Russia) Vladimir Popov, (Note: His real name is alleged by Bellingcat and The Insider to be Vladimir Nikolaevich Moiseev) GRU, conspirator, not extradited
- (Serbia) (Austria) Saša "Aleksandar" Sinđelić, prosecutor's witness
- (Montenegro) Andrija Mandić, leader of New Serb Democracy
- (Montenegro) Milan Knežević, leader of Democratic People's Party
- (Montenegro) Mihailo Čađenović, Andrija Mandić's driver
- (Serbia) Several Serbian nationals, including Bratislav Dikić

== Criminal prosecution, trial, and verdict ==
In early June 2017, the High Court in Podgorica confirmed the indictment of 14 people, including two Russians and two pro-Russia Montenegrin opposition leaders, Andrija Mandić and Milan Knežević (the Democratic Front), who had been charged with "preparing a conspiracy against the constitutional order and the security of Montenegro" and an "attempted terrorist act." Officials alleged that the plotters had conspired to take over parliament during the October 2016 parliamentary election, assassinate then-prime minister Milo Đukanović, and install a pro-Russian government in order to halt Montenegro's bid to join NATO. According to the prosecution, the relevant orders had been received by Saša Sinđelić, an Austria-born Serbian citizen previously convicted of murder in Croatia and now acting as a witness for the prosecution, from Eduard Shishmakov (at first referred to by media as Shirokov), who had earlier been expelled from Poland as an exposed officer of the Russian military intelligence.

On 6 September 2017, the trial of those indicted began in the High Court in Podgorica, the two Russian nationals, Eduard Shishmakov and Vladimir Popov, being tried in absentia. In a separate case, on 18 October 2017 Milan Knežević was convicted of assaulting a policeman on 17 October 2015 and sentenced to 7 months in prison.

At the end of October 2017, the court heard evidence from Saša Sinđelić, who, among other things, reportedly told the court he had learned from Eduard Shishmakov of Ramzan Kadyrov, the Head of the Chechen Republic, being involved in the coup plot. At the end of November 2017, the Russian daily broadsheet Izvestia reported that Andrija Mandić and Milan Knežević had sent a letter to Russian foreign minister Sergey Lavrov, saying Kadyrov had figured in the indictment starting from the previous week and requesting Russia's support. The defence sought to question the credibility and psychiatric competence of the prosecutor's witness.

In early June 2018, the court in Podgorica heard evidence from Brian Scott, a former CIA operative and the chief executive officer of a U.S. risk-management company Patriot Defense Group: he was questioned by prosecutors about these events. Scott stated that his company, Strategic Risk Management, refused the request due to reports of a connection between Democratic Front and Russian intelligence officers. In July 2018, the Montenegrin prosecutors launched a formal investigation into other's alleged role in the coup plot.

On 9 May 2019, the Higher Court in Montenegro found guilty of plotting to commit ″terrorist acts″ and undermine the constitutional order of Montenegro during the 2016 parliamentary election and first instance sentenced 13 people, including the two alleged Russian military intelligence officers, Eduard Shishmakov and Vladimir Popov (to 15 and 12 years in prison, in absentia, respectively), and two opposition leaders, Andrija Mandić and Milan Knežević (five-year jail terms each); Bratislav Dikić was sentenced to eight years in jail.

== Verdict aftermath ==
On 28 April 2017, Montenegro's parliament voted 46–0 to join NATO, while the majority of opposition parties kept boycotting parliament sessions and protesters burned NATO flags outside. Tensions between Montenegro and Russia continued to escalate thereafter. In November 2019, the U.S. Department of Defense-authorized, editorially independent newspaper, Stars and Stripes, cited the "hybrid attack during [Montenegrin] elections in 2016" as an explanation why the first NATO counter-hybrid warfare team was being deployed to Montenegro.

In May 2019 the then Foreign Secretary of the United Kingdom, Jeremy Hunt, stated: The failed coup attempt against Montenegro in 2016 was one of the most outrageous examples of Russia’s attempts to undermine European democracy. The GRU’s brazen attempt to interfere with Montenegro’s national elections and undermine Montenegro’s application to join NATO is yet another example of destabilising and aggressive Russian behaviour over the last decade.

On 1 September 2020, Montenegrin President Milo Đukanović accused Serbian President Aleksandar Vučić and Belgrade-based media of interfering in the internal politics of Montenegro, as well of alleged trying to revive a "Greater Serbia policy".

== Annulment of the verdict ==
On 5 February 2021, the Court of Appeals of Montenegro annulled the first instance verdict on all counts of the indictment. "The Council annulled the first-instance verdict because significant violations of the provisions of the criminal procedure were committed in the procedure of its passing and in the verdict itself, due to which neither factual nor legal conclusions could be accepted in the first-instance verdict, as in the existence of criminal offenses guilty, as well as in relation to the existence of their guilt for the acts", it is stated in the announcement of the appellate court. The "coup d'état" case was returned to the High Court in Podgorica, for a retrial before a completely changed composition. Some saw the decisions of the appellate court as a confirmation of then ruling Democratic Party of Socialists's mounted political process against its political opposition, and proof that the first instance verdict was passed under the pressure of the then DPS-led government in Montenegro.

== Retrial and final acquittal ==
The Montenegrin Higher Court refused in April 2023 to split the retrial into two, with one involving Mandić, Knežević and Čađenović, and the other with 10 defendants, so secret documents could be presented by the prosecution. Starting in June 2023, it was originally scheduled to continue in October 2023, however the retrial continuation date was moved to February 2024. The court ruled to uphold the acquittals in July 2024. The Special State Prosecutor's Office (SDT) appealed the acquittal in June 2025. The Court of Appeal of Montenegro has rejected the appeal filed by the Special State Prosecutor’s Office in the so-called “coup attempt” case. By doing so, the court confirmed the previous acquittal issued by the High Court in Podgorica in July 2024. This means that all defendants in the case have been officially acquitted.

== See also ==
- List of coups d'état and coup attempts since 2010
- Russia involvement in regime change
- NATO-Russia relations, Montenegro-NATO relations
- 2015–16 Montenegrin crisis
- 2016 Montenegrin parliamentary election
