= Death of Ranko Panić =

2008 Serbian police brutality incident

- Date: 29 July 2008
- Location: Republic Square, Belgrade, Serbia
- Accused: Gendarmerie officer Nikica Ristić
- Charges: Serious bodily injury
- Verdict: Not guilty

Ranko Panić (Serbian Cyrillic: Ранко Панић; 15 February 1967 – 15 August 2008) was a Serbian warehouse clerk who died due to injuries sustained from police brutality on 29 July 2008 during a protest against the arrest of Radovan Karadžić organized by the Serbian Radical Party and New Serbia.

The incident provoked a public outcry and Aleksandar Vučić has repeatedly accused the then ruling Democratic Party under Boris Tadić, both of hiding evidence of Panić's assailant and of under-reporting the incident.

On 8 September 2014, an officer of the Niš detachment of the Gendarmerie, Nikica Ristić, was arrested on suspicion of inflicting serious bodily injury to Panić leading to his death. Ristić was found not guilty in the first instance by the Higher Court in Belgrade on 10 May 2019.

== Background ==
Panić was born on 15 February 1967 in Karlovac and grew up in Korenica. He was a veteran of the War in Croatia, and arrived in Serbia after Operation Storm as a refugee. Panić lived in Mladenovac with his mother Smilja and domestic partner Mirjana Vujičić. Although he was educated to be a teacher, he worked mainly as a manual laborer and was working as a warehouse clerk for the Granice dairy farm for the past 9 years at the time of his death.

== Incident ==
Following the arrest of ICTY fugitive Radovan Karadžić on 21 July 2008, protests by smaller far-right groups including Obraz and the 1389 Movement had been raging for a week. On 29 July the Serbian Radical Party organized a protest attended by around 16,000 people at the Republic Square in Belgrade called the Pan-Serbian Assembly to protest the arrest and extradition of Karadžić. The protest was co-organized by New Serbia, and supported by the Democratic Party of Serbia.

After the protest, a riot erupted between members of the Gendarmerie heading from Makedonska street and a group of violent protesters, including football hooligans associated with FK Partizan. The Gendarmerie responded with tear gas and rubber bullets. On that night, 46 injured from the riot were admitted into the Emergency Center, including Borislav Pelević, who was hit in the head with a rubber bullet, Miloš Đorelijevski, a journalist for Beta who was beaten by the police despite presenting his press ID, and Oscar Martínez Forcada, a journalist for TVE. Aleksandar Vučić received 4 hits with a baton, and he and Tomislav Nikolić condemned the violent protesters, calling them "provocateurs".

Panić was part of the crowd heading from Makedonska to the Republic Square, according to a friend accompanying him at the time, trying to get closer to Vučić. He was assaulted by a member of the Gendarmerie. The following day, Panić complained to his wife about terrible pain in his stomach and was quickly transferred from a clinic in Mladenovac to the Emergency Center. His large intestine was ruptured, and Panić was immediately operated under a heavy fever. After his second operation on 4 August, Panić fell into a coma and died of sepsis on 15 August.

== Aftermath ==
=== Immediate aftermath ===
The following day, protesters led by Vladimir Đukanović held a remembrance walk carrying a banner honoring Panić's death and accused the mainstream media of sidelining the affair. Panić was buried at the Rajkovac Cemetery near Mladenovac on 19 August. The burial was attended by high ranking members of the Serbian Radical Party including Aleksandar Vučić.

The Radicals obstructed the National Assembly on 2 September asking for information about the use of force at the protest on 29 July and Panić's death. This postponed the discussion on Serbia's Stabilization and Association Agreement. Radical MP Vjerica Radeta damned President Boris Tadić which was condemned by MPs Nada Kolundžija and Suzana Grubješić calling it an act of hate speech. Interior Minister Ivica Dačić announced that an 8-member team had been formed and was working on the reconstruction of Panić's beating. The autopsy findings were released the next day, and the Radicals stopped their blockade of the National Assembly, saying they would wait for an official report from Dačić's team. Before the report was completed, Dačić tried to put the blame on the medical staff responsible for Panić, and draw attention from the role of police brutality. On 16 September, 6 officers of the Ministry of Internal Affairs were suspended for misconduct.

On 22 September, the 16-page report was completed, and included video evidence recorded from the Jugoeksport building released by TV Enter and RTS on 30 July. The report concluded that Panić was kicked in the stomach area by a Gendarmerie officer after walking in parallel for several seconds and a possible verbal confrontation, and knocked over with a second kick as he tried to move away. Tomislav Nikolić called the report unacceptable, saying its conclusion that the Serbian Radical Party provided insufficient security equated the role of the Radicals and extremist groups attending the meeting including several football hooligan groups and the 1389 Movement.

=== Trial ===
On 8 September 2014, an officer of the Niš detachment of the Gendarmerie, Nikica Ristić, was arrested on suspicion of inflicting serious bodily injury to Panić leading to his death. The indictment was filed in December 2015 and the trial opened on 23 December 2016.

Ristić announced in November 2016 he plans to remain silent in court.

On 10 May 2019 the Higher Court in Belgrade reached a first-instance verdict which found Ristić not guilty. Judge Bojan Mišić concluded that it was impossible to prove without reasonable doubt that Panić was beaten by a police officer, that his injuries are what led to his death and that Nikica Ristić and Ranko Panić are indeed the two men depicted in the footage obtained from the Jugoeksport building.

Ristić's lawyer Zora Dobričanin-Nikodinović stated that this was a "great day for justice in Serbia" and that Ristić was "sacrificed not because of justice but politics", i.e. Ristić's close relations with sacked Gendarmerie commander Bratislav Dikić.

Panić's mother Smilja commented: "He was not killed by the Ustashe, but by Serbia. My thanks to the state and the judiciary".

=== Legacy ===
On 29 July 2009, the first anniversary of Panić's encounter with the police, the SNP 1389, a far-right movement with ties to the Serbian Progressive Party, blanketed Belgrade with "Who killed Ranko Panić?" posters.

In 2009, Pravda, a tabloid closely aligned with the Radical and later the Progressive Party, published a book by journalist Predrag Jeremić detailing Panić's life called Uhapšena istina – od Sretenja do Preobraženja (The Truth Under Arrest – from the Presentation to the Transfiguration). The name refers to the dates of the two Orthodox holidays, coinciding with the dates of Panić's birth and burial. The introduction was written by Aleksandar Vučić.

Vučić has organized commemorations of Ranko Panić's encounter with the police at Republic Square on the first and second anniversary in 2009 and 2010. In 2009, Vučić promised to honor Panić with a street name. On the fourth anniversary in 2012, he made a public visit to Panić's mother Smilja. In 2013, the commemoration was attended by high ranking Progressive Party member Nebojša Stefanović.

Vučić has repeatedly accused the Democratic Party leadership under Boris Tadić, as well as the Cvetković cabinet, both of hiding evidence of Panić's assailant and of under-reporting the incident. Since the Socialist Party of Serbia formed a coalition with the Progressives, Dačić has also accused the Democrats and highlighted their connection to former Gendarmerie leader Bratislav Dikić. These accusations were compiled in 2018 by Istinomer, a Serbian project based on PolitiFact.
