= 2015–2016 Montenegrin crisis =

2015–2016 political crisis in Montenegro

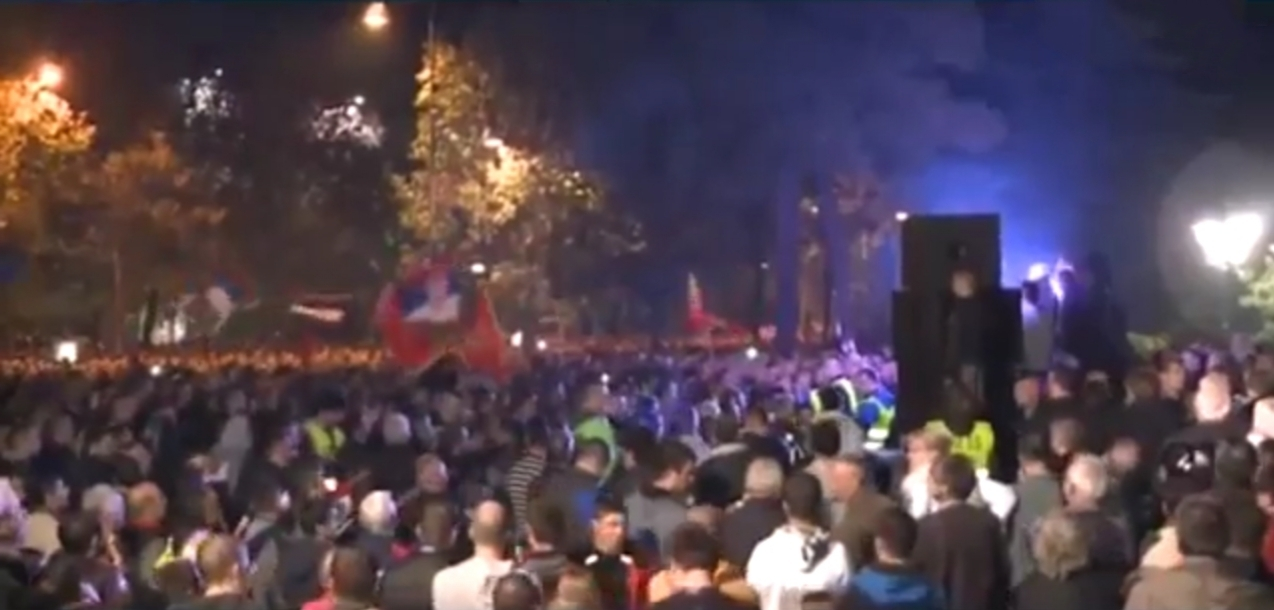
- Anti-government protest in Podgorica, February 2016
- Date: 27 September 2015 – 28 November 2016
- Location: Podgorica, Montenegro
- Caused by: Authoritarianism of Milo Đukanović; Accession of Montenegro to NATO; Accusations of electoral fraud; Excessive force by police; Media censorship.
- Goals: Removal of Đukanović, fair elections, freedom of the press
- Methods: Demonstrations, riot, civil disobedience
- Result: No-confidence voting against the Đukanović Cabinet in January 2016

Parties
Democratic Front; Socialist People's Party	Montenegrin Government; Law enforcement

Lead figures
Andrija Mandić; Nebojša Medojević	Milo Đukanović; Duško Marković

A political crisis in Montenegro was initiated by the opposition parties which staged protests requesting fair elections and transitional government. Opposition coalition Democratic Front organised continuous protests in October 2015 which culminated in a large riot in Podgorica on 24 October. A split in the ruling coalition followed in January 2016, leaving the government functioning as a de facto minority government.

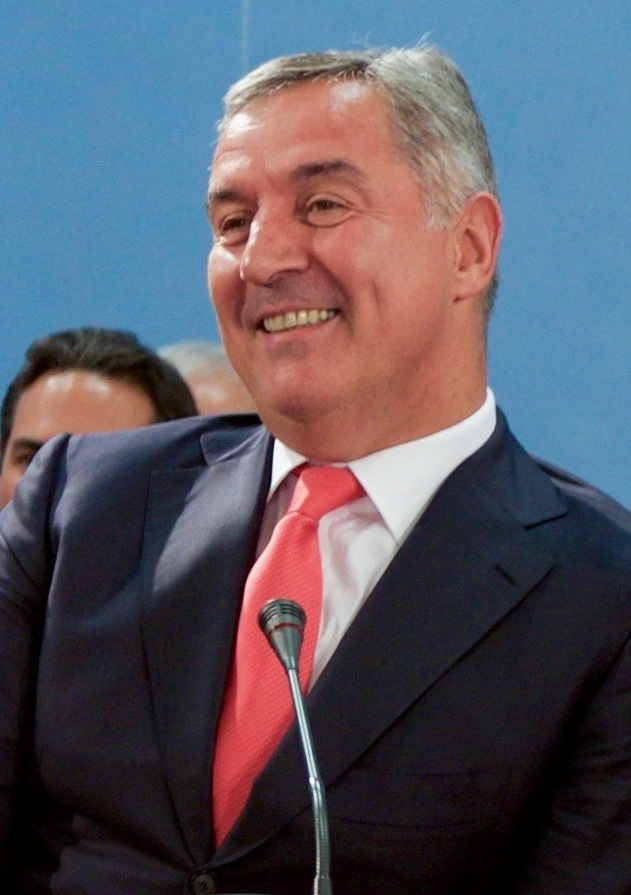
The opposition demanded a transitional government and the resignation of Prime Minister Milo Đukanović, who has led the country since the 1990s.

== Background ==
=== Milo Đukanović's leadership ===
In 2015, the investigative journalists' network OCCRP named Montenegro's long-time President and Prime Minister Milo Đukanović "Person of the Year in Organized Crime". The extent of Đukanović's corruption led to street demonstrations and calls for his removal.

== Anti-government protests ==
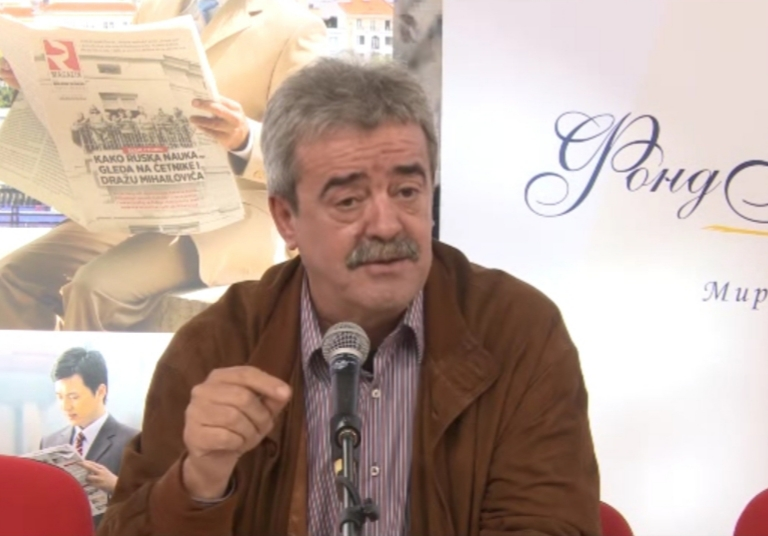
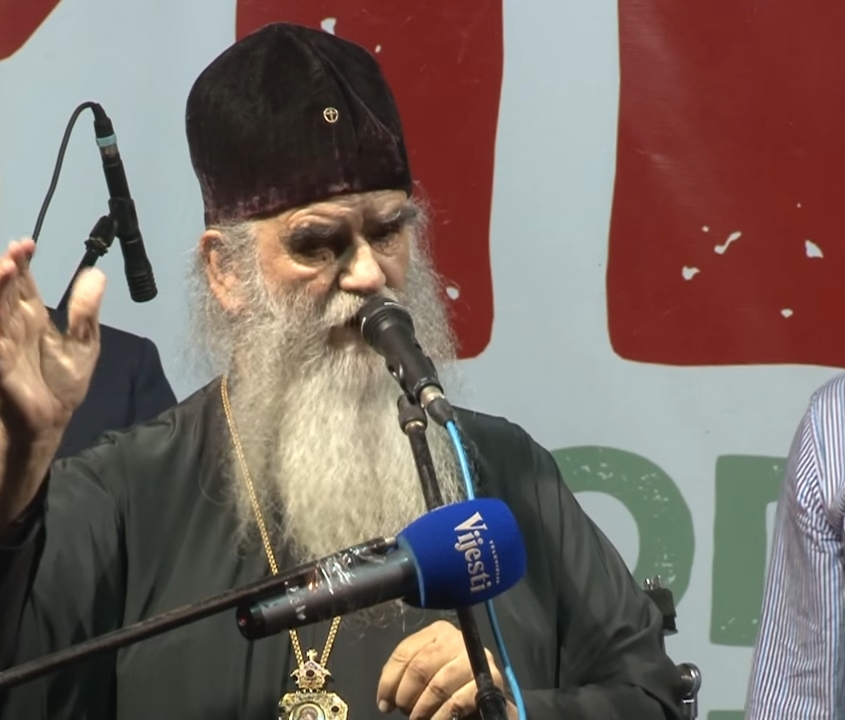
(left) Momir Bulatović (Former Montenegrin President) press, after one of the anti-government protests in Podgorica in October 2015. (right) Bishop Amfilohije Radović, giving a speech at the anti-government rally in October 2015.

Anti-government protests in Montenegro began in mid-October 2015 and culminated in riots on 24 October 2015 in the capital of Podgorica. The protests were organised by the opposition coalition Democratic Front, which is requesting the formation of a transitional government which would organise next elections.

After thousands of people rallied to protest government corruption and demand a transitional government and resignation of Prime Minister Milo Đukanović, who has held prime ministerial or presidential positions for most of the time since 1990, the police intervened tear-gassing the demonstrators on 24 October. Montenegrin police fired tear gas at opposition supporters, while chasing away the demonstrators with armored vehicles. A protest against joining NATO was held in Podgorica on 12 December 2015. A new protest against the government was held on 24 January 2016.

== DPS–SDP split ==
On 27 January 2016, a parliamentary vote saw the split of the ruling DPS and up until then coalition partner SDP. This followed a failed crisis talk over the organization of the "first free and fair election". The President of the National Assembly Ranko Krivokapić (SDP) strongly criticized Prime Minister Milo Djukanović and the ruling party (DPS). With the split of SDP, Djukanović lost the Assembly majority. Djukanović started an initiative to remove Krivokapić from the seat.

== Government confidence voting ==
On 27 January 2016, despite formerly being an opposition party, Positive Montenegro (PCG) provided the ruling DPS with 3 votes necessary to win the government confidence vote, after the junior partner SDP left the government due to allegations of electoral fraud and political corruption, therefore forming a new ruling majority. Following this vote, national media and other opposition parties accused PCG for deceiving and betraying its voters in order to save Prime Minister Đukanović. In turn, in June 2016 Darko Pajović (PCG) was appointed as the President of the Parliament, position formerly held by Ranko Krivokapić (SDP), and held the position until October 2016.

== Provisional Government ==
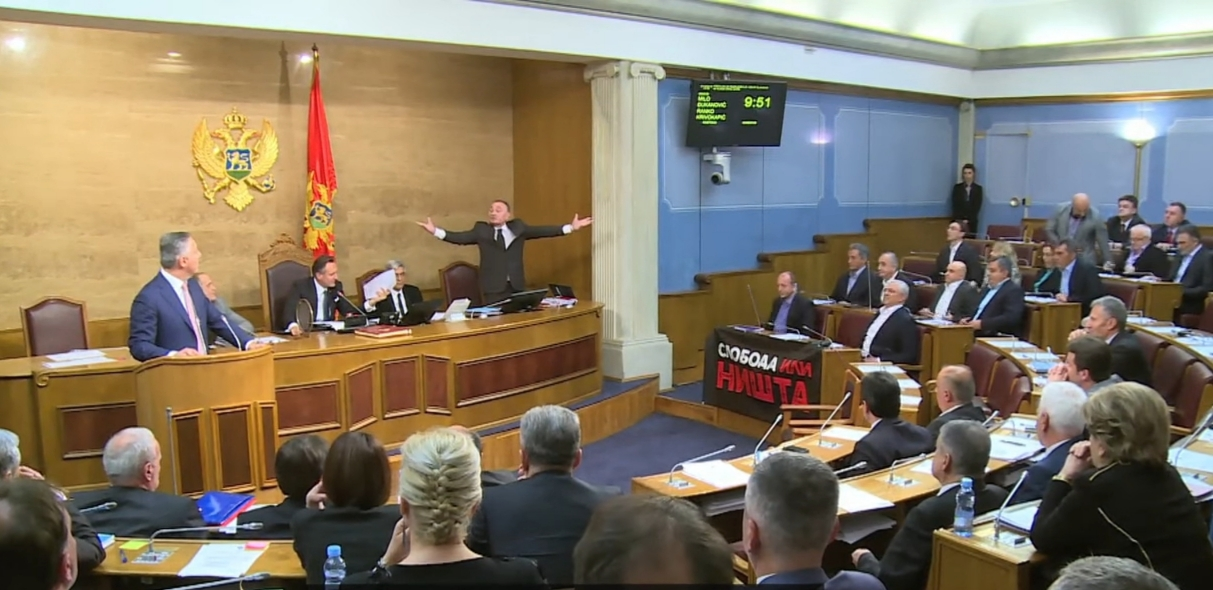
In May 2016, PM Đukanović (left) speech was interrupted by opposition MPs (right), which was followed by a verbal clash, between Đukanović and opposition deputies in the Montenegrin parliament.

A split in the ruling coalition followed in January 2016, leaving the government functioning as a de facto minority government. The provisional government of electoral trust was elected on 12 May 2016, by the parliament of Montenegro. The provisional governing coalition was formed by DPS and several opposition parties.

=== Parliament interruption ===
On 13 May 2016, Prime Minister Milo Đukanović's speech was interrupted by the Democratic Front MPs, who chanted "Milo, you thief" (Montenegrin: Milo, lopove / Мило, лопове), which was followed by a verbal clash between Đukanović and Democratic Front MPs, which was eventually prevented by the other MPs and parliamentary security service.

== Coup plot ==
16 October 2016 arrests
- Planned by: Ministry of Interior Affairs
- Objective: Capture alleged coup conspirators
- Date: 16 October 2016
- Executed by: Law enforcement
- Outcome: 20 arrests
- Casualties: none

On 16 October 2016, on the day of the parliamentary election, a group of 20 Serbian and Montenegrin citizens, including the former head of Serbian Gendarmery Bratislav Dikić, were arrested; they, along with other persons, including Russian citizens, were later formally charged by the authorities of Montenegro with an attempted coup d'état. In February 2017, Montenegrin officials accused the Russian state structures of being behind the attempted coup, which envisaged an attack on the country's parliament and assassination of prime minister Milo Đukanović; those accusations were rejected by the Russian government.

According to the prime minister Duško Marković′s statements made in February 2017, the government received definitive information about the coup being prepared on 12 October 2016, when a person involved in the plot gave away the fallback scenario of his Russian minders, who thus aimed to prevent the country from joining NATO; this information was also corroborated by the security services of NATO member countries, who helped the Montenegrin government to investigate the plot. In early June 2017, the High Court in Montenegro confirmed the indictment of 14 people, including two Russians and two pro-Russia Montenegrin opposition leaders, Andrija Mandic and Milan Knezevic, who had been charged with "preparing a conspiracy against the constitutional order and the security of Montenegro" and an "attempted terrorist act".

== Aftermath ==
=== Parliament boycott ===
Following the events which surrounded the latest parliamentary election, the major opposition parties made a decision to begin a collective boycott of all parliamentary sessions; the boycott continued into 2017, extending to local elections.

=== NATO accession ===
On 28 April 2017, Montenegro's parliament voted 46–0 to join NATO (with 35 MP absentees, out of 81 in Montenegrin parliament), while the opposition parties kept boycotting parliament sessions and protesters burned NATO flags outside. Tensions between Montenegro and Russian Federation continued to escalate thereafter.

== See also ==
- 2012 Montenegrin parliamentary election
- 2016 Montenegrin parliamentary election
