= Russian involvement in regime change =

List of regime changes orchestrated by Russia

Since the dissolution of the Soviet Union in 1991, the Russian government has made multiple attempts to replace foreign regimes through overt or covert interventions.

== During the Soviet Union ==
Prior to 1991, the Soviet Union intervened in multiple governments primarily in Asia, acquiring the territory of Tuva and making Mongolia into a satellite state.

During World War II, the Soviet Union helped overthrow many Nazi German or Imperial Japanese puppet regimes, including in East Asia and much of Europe.

It expanded the geographic scope of its actions beyond its traditional area of operations. One study indicated that the United States and the Soviet Union/Russia engaged in 117 interventions, or one in nine of every competitive foreign elections at the executive national-level from 1946 to 2000, with the Soviet Union/Russia accounting for 36 interventions.

The Soviet Union ratified the UN Charter in 1945, the preeminent international law document, which legally bound the Soviet government to the Charter's provisions, including Article 2(4), which prohibits the threat or use of force in international relations, except in very limited circumstances. Therefore, any legal claim advanced to justify regime change by a foreign power carries a particularly heavy burden.

== 1991–present ==
=== 1991–1992: Georgia ===
In December 1991 – January 1992, first Georgian president Zviad Gamsakhurdia was removed from office by the coup staged by the National Guard and a group of paramilitary organizations, which captured the Council of Ministers building after a fierce fighting. The Russian (former Soviet) Transcaucasian Military District, with its headquarters in Georgian capital Tbilisi, was allegedly involved in this coup. On 15 December 1992, the Russian newspaper Moskovskiye Novosti published a letter from Colonel-General Sufian Bepayev, who was then the vice-commander of the Transcaucasian Military District, who claimed to have brought logistical and military help to the rebels starting on 28 December 1991. According to that letter, lacking the interference of the Russian soldiers, "Gamsakhurdia supporters would have had a guaranteed victory." This version of the facts revealed also an involvement by Russian soldiers during the battle around the Broadcasting Tower of Tbilisi on 28 December. It has been claimed that the goal of Russian involvement was to counter Gamsakhurdia's refusal to join the Russian-led Commonwealth of Independent States (CIS). Gamsakhurdia loyalists abandoned Tbilisi and retreated to western Georgia (Mingrelia), later launching a counter-attack in October 1993. On 20 October 1993, Russian president Boris Yeltsin sent 2,000 Russian troops to Georgia to aid the post-coup Georgian government of Eduard Shevardnadze against Gamsakhurdia supporters. In mid-October, the addition of Russian weapons, supply-line security, and technical assistance turned the tide against Gamsakhurdia. However, the Russian government claimed neutrality, saying that the purpose of sending troops was to protect an important railway in Georgia. This was an effective political screen. From November 2, following an agreement between Eduard Shevardnadze and Russian leadership, a Russian marine battalion was deployed to Georgian city of Poti in order to secure critical transport infrastructure, including railroads and ports under the direction of Admiral Eduard Baltin, commander of the Black Sea Fleet. In order to obtain this support, Shevardnadze had to agree to Georgian accession to CIS and the establishment of Russian military installations within Georgia.

=== 1993: Azerbaijan ===
Russia allegedly backed the coup against first Azerbaijani President Abulfaz Elchibey. The 709th Brigade of Azerbaijani army rebelled against Elchibey and after defeating the attack of the government forces, launched an offensive on capital Baku, armed with materiel left by the Russian 104th Airborne Division. The coup ousted Elchibey and installed Heydar Aliyev as president.

=== 1994: Chechnya ===
In 1994, the Provisional Council of the Chechen Republic launched a coup against Dzhokhar Dudayev, the president of Russia's breakaway Chechen republic of Ichkeria. The Russian government officially denied military involvement in the operation, but openly supported the Provisional Council of the Chechen Republic. Moscow clandestinely supplied opposition forces with financial support, military equipment and mercenaries. Russia also suspended all civilian flights to Grozny while the aviation and border troops set up a military blockade of the republic, and eventually unmarked Russian aircraft began combat operations over Chechnya. Provisional Council, who were joined by Russian troops, launched a clandestine but badly organized assault on Grozny in mid-October 1994, followed by a second, larger attack on 26–27 November 1994. Despite Russian support, both attempts were unsuccessful. Dudayev loyalists succeeded in capturing some 20 Russian Army regulars and about 50 other Russian citizens who were clandestinely hired by the Russian FSK state security organization to fight for the Provisional Council forces. On 29 November, Russian president Boris Yeltsin issued an ultimatum to all warring factions in Chechnya, ordering them to disarm and surrender. When the government of Chechnya refused, Yeltsin ordered the Russian army to invade the region.

=== 1999: Chechnya ===
The location of Chechnya

Following the 1999 Russian apartment bombings and a militant incursion in Dagestan, Russia initiated an invasion of the Chechen Republic of Ichkeria to dismantle the separatist government led by Aslan Maskhadov. Russian forces employed heavy artillery in the Battle of Grozny. And would establish a pro-Moscow administration under Akhmad Kadyrov, which subsequently led to a long-term insurgency. Maskhadov was discovered and killed in Tolstoy-Yurt, a village in northern Chechnya, in March 2005. The Kremlin officially terminated its "counter-terrorism operation" in April 2009, bringing the region under tight control.

=== 2014: Ukraine ===
The location of Ukraine

In 2014, Ukraine had the Revolution of Dignity and overthrew Viktor Yanukovych. Following a Russian invasion on 27 February 2014 and the armed seizure and dissolution of the Crimean Parliament 6 March 2014, the Russian-installed replacement cabinet voted to "enter into the Russian Federation with the rights of a subject of the Russian Federation" and later held a referendum asking the people of these regions whether they wanted to join Russia as a federal subject, or if they wanted to restore the 1992 Crimean constitution and Crimea's status as a part of Ukraine. Though passed with an overwhelming majority, the results are contested by most. Crimea and Sevastopol formally declared independence as the Republic of Crimea and requested that they be admitted as constituents of the Russian Federation. On 18 March 2014, Russia and Crimea signed a treaty of accession of the Republic of Crimea and Sevastopol in the Russian Federation, though the United Nations General Assembly voted in favor of a non-binding statement to oppose Russia's annexation of the peninsula.

Pro-Russian hackers launched a series of cyber attacks over several days to disrupt the May 2014 Ukrainian presidential election, releasing hacked emails, attempting to alter vote tallies, and delaying the result with distributed denial-of-service attacks. Malware that would have displayed a graphic declaring far-right candidate Dmytro Yarosh the electoral winner was removed from Ukraine's Central Election Commission less than an hour before polls closed. Despite this, Channel One Russia "reported that Mr. Yarosh had won and broadcast the fake graphic, citing the election commission's website, even though it had never appeared there." According to Peter Ordeshook: "These faked results were geared for a specific audience in order to feed the Russian narrative that has claimed from the start that ultra-nationalists and Nazis were behind the revolution in Ukraine."

All these events set up the stage for the war in Donbas.

=== 2016: Montenegro ===
On the eve of 16 October 2016, the day of the parliamentary election in Montenegro, a group of 20 Serbian and Montenegrin citizens, including the former head of Serbian Gendarmery Bratislav Dikić, were arrested; some of them, along with other persons, including two Russian citizens, were later formally charged by the authorities of Montenegro with an attempted coup d'état. In early November 2016, Montenegro's special prosecutor for organised crime and corruption, Milivoje Katnić, alleged that "a powerful organization" that comprised about 500 people from Russia, Serbia and Montenegro was behind the coup plot. In February 2017, Montenegrin officials accused the Russian 'state structures' of being behind the attempted coup, which allegedly envisaged an attack on the Parliament of Montenegro and assassination of prime minister Milo Đukanović.

The details about the coup plot were first made public at the end of October 2016 by Serbia's prime minister Aleksandar Vučić, whose public statement on the matter stressed the role of Serbia's law enforcers, especially the Serbian Security Intelligence Agency, in thwarting it. The statement was immediately followed by an unscheduled visit to Belgrade by Nikolai Patrushev, secretary of Russia's Security Council.

According to the prime minister Duško Marković′s statements made in February 2017, the government received definitive information about the coup being prepared on 12 October 2016, when a person involved in the plot gave away the fallback scenario of his Russian minders; this information was also corroborated by the security services of NATO member countries, who helped the Montenegrin government to investigate the plot. One of the charged, Predrag Bogićević from Kragujevac, a veteran and leader of the Ravna Gora Movement, said that Saša Sinđelić informed him on a possible attack on Serbs who participated in the October 16th protest. Bogićević, in Serbian detention, said through his lawyer that there was no talks whatsoever on a coup and no mentions of Đukanović.

The Moscow–based Russian Institute for Strategic Studies (RISS), which has close ties to Russian Foreign Intelligence Service (SVR), was mentioned by mass media as one of the organisations involved in devising the coup plot; in early November 2017, Russian president Vladimir Putin sacked the RISS director, Leonid P. Reshetnikov, a ranking veteran officer of the SVR.

=== 2020: Mali ===
President Ibrahim Boubacar Keïta faced wave of protests in Mali since 5 June 2020 calling for his resignation from office caused by corruption and economic hardship. On 18 August 2020, the rebelling elements of Malian Armed Forces staged a coup against Keïta, arresting dozens of high ranking government officials and declaring Assimi Goïta as interim head of state. There are several reports suggesting that Russia was behind the coup in Mali as two coup plotters Colonel Malick Diaw and Sadio Camara were said to be trained in Russia before staging a coup.

=== 2022: Ukraine ===
In July 2022, Russian foreign minister Sergey Lavrov stated that Russia's goal was to overthrow the government in Ukraine.

=== 2023: Moldova ===
On 9 February 2023, Ukrainian president Volodymyr Zelenskyy said that Ukrainian intelligence had intercepted plans by Russian intelligence to overthrow the democratically elected government of Moldova to establish control over the country. The allegations were subsequently corroborated by Moldovan intelligence. On 13 February, the president of Moldova Maia Sandu said Moldovan authorities have confirmed the existence of the plot first revealed by Zelenskyy, and revealed details of the alleged plot. On 21 February, Moldovan authorities warned that Russia may attempt to seize the Chișinău International Airport in order to transfer troops for a coup, stating that they were preparing for multiple scenarios. On 10 March, the Moldovan authorities claimed that Russia-linked individuals were plotting an insurrection, and on 12 March, Moldovan police claimed that they had arrested members of a Moscow-orchestrated network trying to destabilize Moldova, who had been promised $10,000 to organize "mass disorder".

=== 2023: Sudan ===
There were reports that Russian state sponsored paramilitary Wagner Group has dispatched a plane to supply the Rapid Support Forces during the clash.

=== 2024: Armenia ===
In June 2024, Armenian prime minister Nikol Pashinyan claimed that the Armenian intelligence foiled a plot by seven Armenians who were allegedly trained at a Russian military base. Russia denied any involvement.

=== 2025: Moldova ===
On 12 December 2024, Alexandru Musteață, the head of the SIS, stated that the parliamentary election was expected to face significant interference from Russia, warning that Moscow was likely to employ the tactics used during the 2024 presidential election and the EU referendum. These would include disinformation and manipulation campaigns, political and electoral corruption, and street protests and unrest. On 3 September 2025, after an interview with Moldova's energy minister Dorin Junghietu, Euronews reported that Moldovan officials were anticipating an intensification of disinformation campaigns and even attacks on the Moldovan energy system by Russia to increase tensions before the parliamentary election. On 24 September, Recean declared that Russia wanted "to take power in Chișinău, violating the sovereign will of the Moldovans" and stated that Moldova was pushing back firmly and that it would "thwart the Russian plan of occupation". He described Russian methods as increasingly radical, including involving criminal groups to prepare mass disorder, electoral corruption by Shor's criminal network, cyberattacks and mass disinformation. According to Agence France-Presse, analysts warned that Moldova had become a "testing ground" for Russia's information warfare in Europe.

A BBC News investigation found a network in Moldova which participants were promised to get paid if they posted pro-Russian propaganda and fake news undermining PAS ahead of the election. An investigation by Ziarul de Gardă reported that hundreds of accounts with false identities were created to spread Russian propaganda in TikTok and Facebook before the election, with many of these supporting Furtună's Greater Moldova Party (PMM). NordNews published an investigation in which members of the newspaper's team infiltrated one of the influence networks of the Russian NGO Evrazia controlled by Shor, even providing services for the Patriotic Bloc, Alternative and the PMM, "all to show you how Russia is trying to dictate who you should put your stamp on on 28 September".

On 22 September 2025, Bloomberg reported, citing European officials and documents of undisclosed origin, that Russia had prepared a plan to interfere in the Moldovan parliamentary election, which would include vote buying and transport of voters in the Moldovan diaspora, a disinformation campaign in both Romanian and Russian on social media (Facebook, Telegram, TikTok) and through call centres, the leak of compromising information about Moldovan officials, and provocations during the election and mass protests afterward carried out by youth from sports clubs and criminal groups. The next day, the Moldovan ambassador to Romania Victor Chirilă stated that Moldovans in France, Germany, Italy, Romania and the United Kingdom were being offered up to 100 euros for their vote. Furthermore, according to Reuters, Russia paid for Moldovan priests' trips to Moscow and gave them bank cards, to which money was sent in exchange of them creating Telegram channels, promoting anti-European ideas and criticizing the Moldovan authorities.

According to European officials cited by Bloomberg, for interfering in the election, Russia would have likely allocated an amount comparable to the money it used to interfere in the 2024 presidential election and EU referendum; that is, around 150 million euros, or approximately 1% of Moldova's GDP. According to Chirilă, if Russia would have invested almost 50 million euros to interfere in the Moldovan electoral period in 2024, for the 2025 election it would have invested over 300 million euros. Ukrainian journalist Dmitry Gordon, citing "documents leaked from the Kremlin", put this figure at 350 million dollars at least. Gordon also claimed that, in the case of a pro-Russian victory in the election, Russia would seek to capture Moldova's state institutions and that it was even considering to use Moldova to open a second front in its invasion of Ukraine, attacking Odesa Oblast with up to 40,000 contract soldiers from various regions that could be brought to Transnistria together with weapons and ammunition within a year as he reported. In a 24 September speech to the United Nations General Assembly (UNGA), Volodymyr Zelenskyy, the President of Ukraine, called on Western allies to step up support to Moldova to fight the growing Russian interference in its domestic politics. Zelenskyy argued that Belarus and Georgia had already fallen under Russian influence due to a lack of sustained international attention and stated "Europe cannot afford to lose Moldova too". Sandu later stated in 2026 that Russia had planned to turn Moldova into a "second Belarus" and use Moldovan territory against Ukraine and the EU.

In September, the European Digital Media Observatory reported that, in the final stretch of the campaign for the election, "the information warfare landscape continues to evolve with increasing intensity". In the run-up to the election, TikTok removed over 134,000 fake accounts, nearly 2 million fake followers, 1,173 accounts impersonating Moldovan officials and over 9,300 videos that violated rules on civic integrity, disinformation and content generation with artificial intelligence (AI); prevented 2.9 million fake likes, 1.8 million fake follow requests, and blocked the creation of over 268,000 spam accounts; and dismantled five coordinated networks with at least 7,593 accounts that "promoted pro-Russian politicians and attempted to discredit the current government". Furthermore, according to a study by the international analysis company OpenMinds published on the eve of the election, in Moldova, a third of all Telegram channels systematically spread Russian propaganda and one in eight comments came from bots. For its part, Telegram refused any collaboration with the Moldovan authorities against illegal activities in the platform such as vote buying. According to Liliana Vițu, the chair of Moldova's Audiovisual Council, the country was at "the mercy of the very big platforms", which she said were being used to spread Russian disinformation and narratives to destabilize the country. The EU took several measures to help counter cyberattacks and disinformation against Moldova, and in the United States, several bipartisan lawmakers expressed concern over the magnitude of Russia's interference in the Moldovan election. Romanian intelligence services also provided crucial support in the cybernetic field, as Romanian president Dan stated later in 2026. Allegedly, part of Russia's disinformation campaign were images spread by propagandists of fake LEGO sets portraying the Moldovan Armed Forces helping Ukraine.

On 11 September, Moldova's interior minister Daniella Misail-Nichitin stated that, since the beginning of the electoral campaign, around 2,000 searches had been carried out, multiple criminal cases had been opened including complaints about paid protests, and dozens of people had been detained. On 16 September, the CNA announced that over 20 million Moldovan lei had been seized during searches in Chișinău amid a case of illegal party financing. On 22 September, Moldovan police conducted raids across the country targeting those they suspected of "preparing Russia-backed disorder". There were over 250 searches conducted according to Moldpres. On 26 September, Serbian police announced the arrest of two people on suspicion of organizing training for 170 participants. The Moldovan government expressed its belief that the Russian military intelligence agency, the GRU, was involved.

For its part, Russia denied meddling in the election and accused the Moldovan government of spreading anti-Russian hysteria to win votes. On the day of the election, Dodon accused Sandu of planning to annul the vote, calling for protests in front of the parliament.

== See also ==
- Russian interference in the 2016 United States elections
- Russian interference in the 2018 United States elections
- Russian interference in the 2020 United States elections
- Russian interference in the 2024 United States elections
- Russian interference in the 2016 Brexit referendum
- Russian interference in British politics
- United States involvement in regime change
- United States involvement in regime change in Latin America
- Regime change
- List of heads of state and government deposed by foreign powers in the 20th and 21st century
