= Goran Radosavljević =

Serbian police general (born 1957)

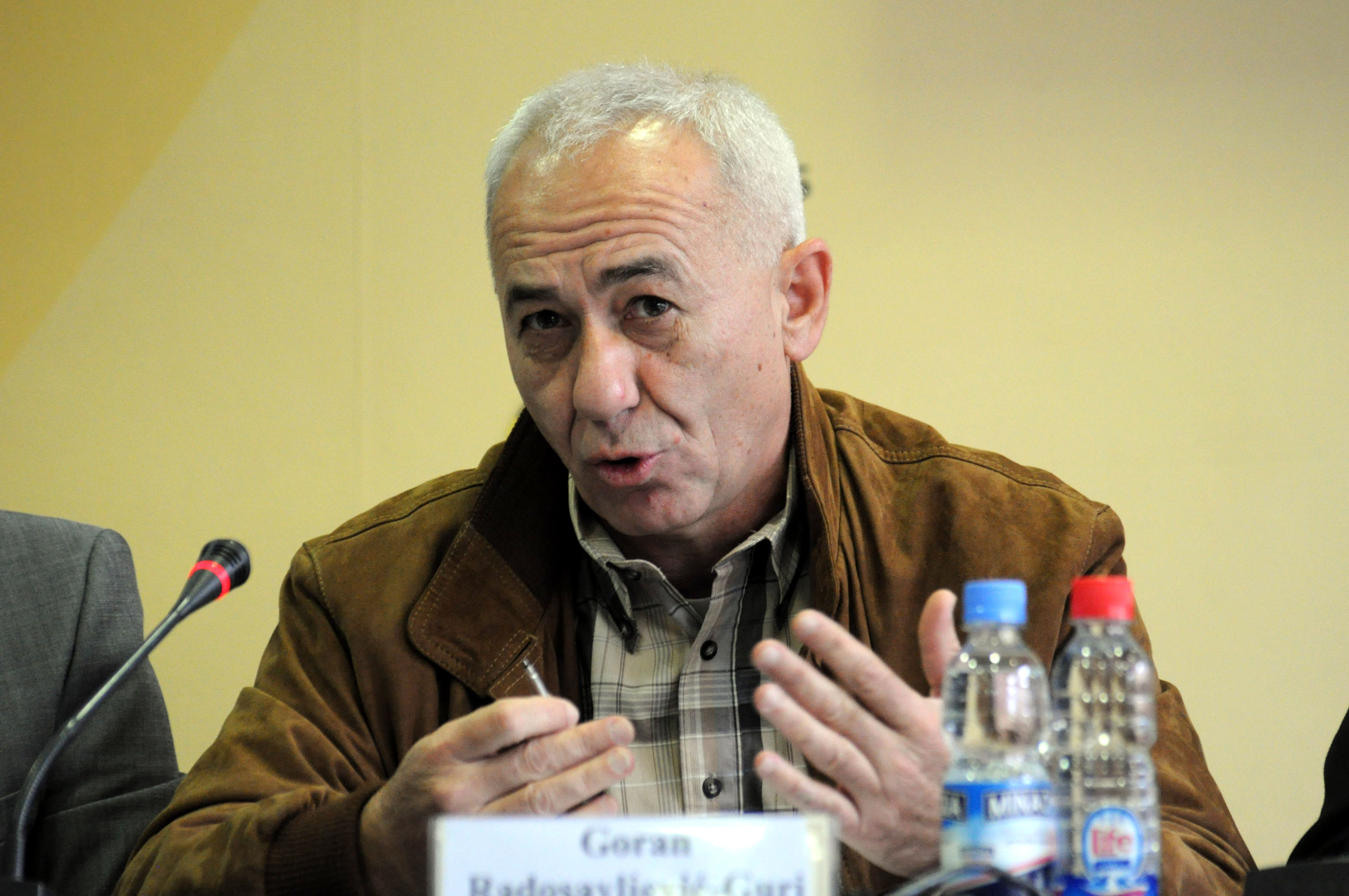
- Radosavljević in November 2010
- Born: 1957 (age 68–69); Aranđelovac, PR Serbia, Yugoslavia
- Other name: Guri
- Police career
- Allegiance: Serbia
- Department: Operational Group (1997–1999); Gendarmery (2001–2005)
- Service years: 1985–2005
- Status: Retired
- Rank: Colonel General

Goran Radosavljević "Guri" (born 1957) is a Serbian former police colonel general and the Commander of the Gendarmery of Serbia from 2001 to 2004. During the Kosovo War he was in the Special Police Units (Serbia) and the leader of a group of counter-terrorist teams that combated the Kosovo Liberation Army (KLA).

== Early life ==
He was born in 1957 in Aranđelovac, SR Serbia, SFR Yugoslavia. Radosavljević graduated from the Faculty for Physical Culture. He worked in the Ministry of Internal Affairs of Serbia since 1985. He initially taught in special combat, and then became the head of the relevant department.

== After the Kosovo War ==
According to some analysts, Radosavljević as commander of operational police pursuit groups had prominent role in overthrow of Slobodan Milošević, as he refused to intervene against demonstrators. As a credit to his decision, the new regime under Zoran Đinđić appointed him to become the first commander of the re-established Gendarmery of Serbia on 28 June 2001 and stayed in that position until 17 August 2004. On 1 February 2005, he was retired from the service.

In 2003, the United States agreed to the deployment of 1,000 Yugoslav soldiers to Afghanistan, commanded by General Goran Radosavljević.

On 17 December 2006, the Serbian police issued a warrant for Goran Radosavljević, however with no indictment being issued against him. In 2007, he went public and denounced the rumors that he had been hiding.

By 2010, Radosavljević had decided to join the Serbian Progressive Party and enrolled in politics. In May 2014, Radosavljević was named the Executive Committee member of the ruling Serbian Progressive Party (SNS).

== War crime allegations ==
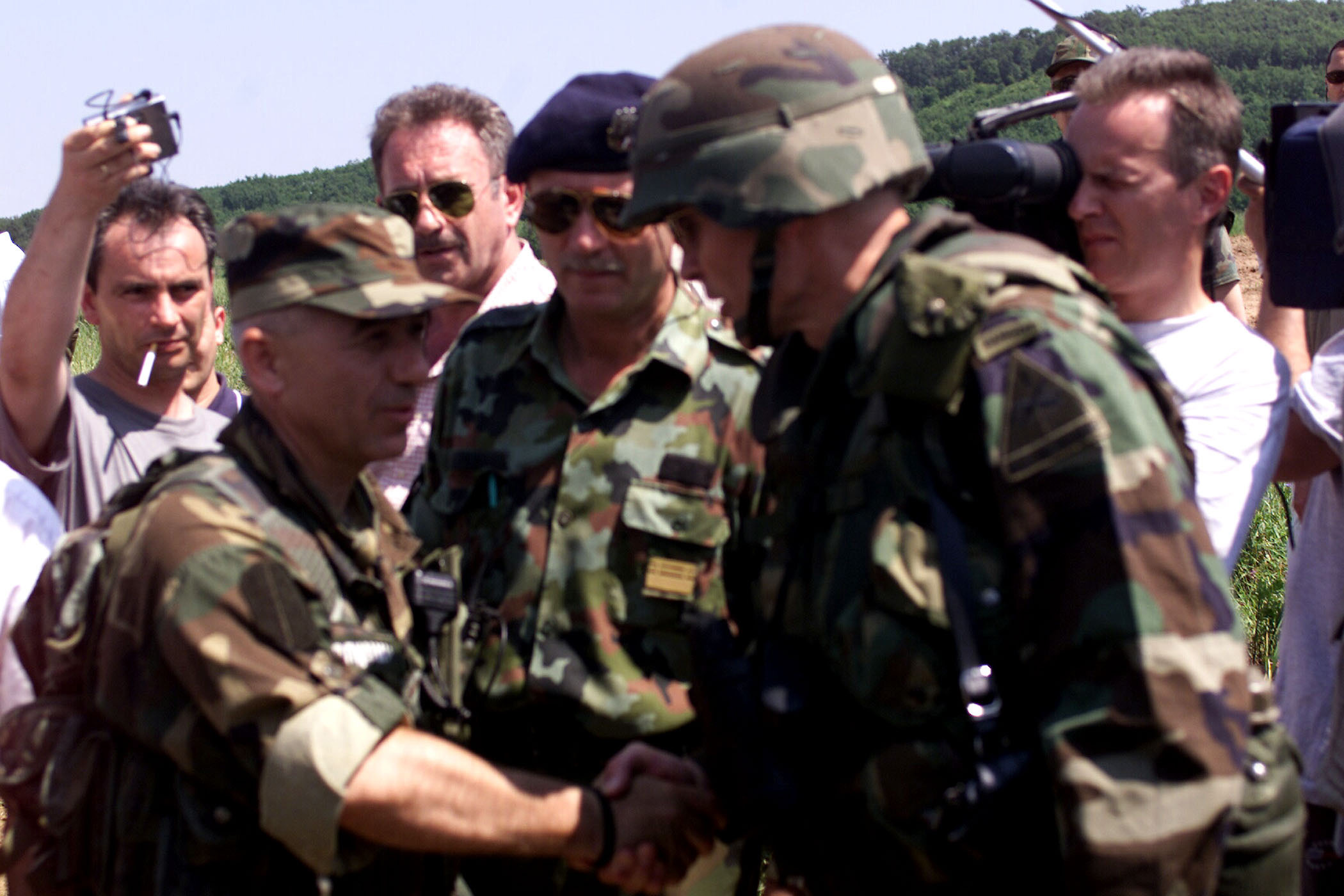
Radosavljević meets the Commanding General of Task Force Falcon Kenneth Quinlan, at the administrative boundary between Kosovo and Serbia during a meeting to discuss the success of the "Ground Safety Zone" reduction on 30 May 2001.

During the Kosovo War (1998–1999), he led a cluster of counter-terrorism teams that were known as the Operational Group (OPG). They were established to counter Kosovo Liberation Army which sought to separate Kosovo from Serbia. The OPG were later suspected of killing 41 ethnic-Albanian civilians in the Ćuška massacre in western Kosovo in May 1999.

A number of human rights groups have claimed that the OPG committed war crimes against civilians. Radosavljević was the person in charge of the military operation in Račak on 15 January 1999, which would become known as the Račak massacre. The Serbian War Crime's prosecutor also brought him in connection with the killing of the Bytyqi brothers, three Albanian American brothers who came to Kosovo to fight on the side of the KLA. Radosavljević was in charge of a Serb police training facility at Petrovo Selo where the Bytyqi brothers were detained, tortured, executed, and buried in a mass grave. In December 2018, US State Department issued sanctions on Radosavljević after credibly implicating him in the 1999 murder of the Bytyqi brothers. The sanctions ban Radosavljević, his wife and daughter from entering the United States.
