= Death of the Bytyqi brothers =

Killing of three American-born Kosovar siblings

In July 1999, Agron, Mehmet and Ylli Bytyqi were captured and then executed by the Serbian police. after the Kosovo War.

== Background ==
Agron (23), Mehmet (21) and Ylli (25) were American citizens of Kosovo Albanian origin born near Chicago, Illinois and living in New York City. The Bytyqi family comes from the village of Semetisht in the town of Suhareka. After the rebellion started in Kosovo they decided to go to Kosovo and fight in KLA's "Atlantic Brigade".

== Ambush ==
Bytyqi brothers were American-Kosovo Albanian members of the Kosovo Liberation Army who were killed by Serbian Police shortly after the end of the Kosovo War, while they were in custody in Petrovo Selo, Kladovo, Serbia. The bodies of the three brothers were discovered in July 2001 in a mass grave containing 70 Albanians, near Special Anti–Terrorist Unit (SAJ) training facility. The bodies were found with their hands bound and with gunshot wounds to their heads. The indictment against the alleged perpetrators says the brothers were brought to the edge of the pit and shot in the head, causing them to slump into a mass grave atop 70 corpses dumped there earlier.

In July 1999, following the conclusion of NATO's military response to the then Federal Republic of Yugoslavia's ethnic cleansing of Albanians and the signing of the Kumanovo Agreement, they smuggled two families – а Serbian family from Suharekë (Kosovo) – to return to Kraljevo, from where they escaped during the war. Due to a violation of the "Law on Movement and Residence of Foreigners" of Republic of Serbia, they were arrested along the transit road between Kosovo and Serbia. They were sentenced to 15 days in prison. Twelve days later after appealing, they were released. Their Serbian neighbor Miroslav waited to collect them, but the brothers were instead collected by two men driving a white car with no license plates. They were taken to the Special Anti–Terrorist Unit training base. Two days later, they were killed with bullets fired to the back of their heads and buried in a mass grave which already contained the bodies of the killed Kosovo Albanians.

== The investigation ==
The Serbian authorities showed little interest to investigate cases where Serbian police has acted during the war in Kosovo, but since the brothers were American citizens and due to the pressure from US authorities, an investigation was launched. The United States saw the murder of the Bytyqi brothers as a premeditated crime committed against its citizens; the American Federal Bureau of Investigation (FBI) started an investigation while the US Embassy in Belgrade monitored the case carefully.

The main suspect was Vlastimir Đorđević, Chief of the Public Security Department of Ministry of Internal Affairs of Serbia (MUP) and assistant minister for internal affairs during the Kosovo war. Đorđević was the commander of the MUP forces in Kosovo in the early 1980s, and one of the most trusted men of Yugoslav president Slobodan Milošević. In July 1999, Miloševic awarded Đorđević the "Medal of the Yugoslav Flag" of the First Degree. He was forced into retirement in May 2001, when the refrigerator truck containing the bodies of Kosovo Albanians was discovered in the Danube near Kladovo. Before the investigation started, Đorđević relocated to Moscow, but was in 2007 arrested in Budva, Montenegro. In 2011, he was found guilty of war crimes against Kosovo Albanian civilians during the Kosovo War before the ICTY. The Minister of Internal Affairs during the Kosovo War Vlajko Stojiljković, who allegedly originated the orders, committed suicide in 2002.

The killing of Bytyqi brothers is still being investigated by Serbia's War Crimes Court. Two low-ranking police figures who may have marginally abetted the crimes, Miloš Stojanović and Sreten Popović, were acquitted of all charges of aiding war crimes in March 2013 because of their marginal involvement in the Bytyqi murders.

In February 2007, the police issued the warrant for Goran "Guri" Radosavljević, after he failed to show up at a trial of Miloš Stojanović and Sreten Popović. Radosavljević was in charge of SAJ's training facility where the brothers were detained, executed, and dumped into a mass grave. Radosavljević testified in the trial, claiming that he was away on vacation at the time of the Bytyqi brothers' detainment and execution.

Four more officers were detained in late February 2007, as the investigation about who exactly ordered and carried out the executions continued, among whom were Milenko Arsenijević (Commander of SAJ at the time) and three other police officers. None were ever charged.

In March 2007, the US Embassy in Belgrade said the U.S. Department of Justice will continue to conduct its own investigation pursuant to U.S. law.

== Trial of Sreten Popović and Miloš Stojanović ==
In 2012 trial in Serbia, two men were found not guilty in aiding in the death of the brothers, in part because of their marginal involvement in the crimes. In 2013, Prosecutor's appeal was denied verdict the acquittals were upheld.

== Aftermath ==
As of July 2019, there are no pending charges in the case and no high-ranking official has been investigated for their involvement. However, several United States Congress members asked the President of Serbia Aleksandar Vučić to extradite former police general Goran Radosavljević to the United States, which he refused, reportedly saying that "there is no evidence for his arrest".

== See also ==
- War crimes in the Kosovo War
