= Special Police Units (Serbia) =

Serbian law enforcement unit

Special Police Units Посебне јединице полиције
- Abbreviation: PJP

Agency overview
- Formed: 1994; 32 years ago
- Dissolved: 28 June 2001; 25 years ago
- Superseding agency: Gendarmery
- Employees: 5,000 (1999)

Jurisdictional structure
- Operations jurisdiction: Serbia
- Governing body: Ministry of Internal Affairs

Operational structure
- Headquarters: Belgrade, Novi Sad, Kragujevac, Užice, Niš
- Agency executive: Obrad Stevanović, Commander

The Special Police Units or Police Special Units (Serbian: Posebne jedinice policije, PJP) was a special police force unit of Serbia's Ministry of Internal Affairs (MUP). It had several detachments and was part of the sector of the State Security Directorate. It was disbanded on 28 June 2001 when it was replaced by the re-establishment of the Gendarmery.

Between 1994 and 1996 it was commanded by Obrad Stevanović. During the Kosovo War (1998–99), the force had an estimated 5,000 or 7,000 men. The PJP detachments were based at Belgrade, Novi Sad, Kragujevac, Užice, Niš and Priština. It is believed that it was commanded by Obrad Stevanović, now the head of police. Its elite unit was the "Lightning" (Munje) unit, according to M. McAllester partly made up of "some of Yugoslavia's most dangerous criminals". Among other special units active in the war was the Special Anti-Terrorist Unit (SAJ), a separate part of the MUP.

== Sources ==
- Gow, James (2003). The Serbian Project and Its Adversaries: A Strategy of War Crimes. C. Hurst & Co. Publishers. pp. 86–87. ISBN 978-1-85065-499-5.
- McAllester, Matthew (2003). Beyond the Mountains of the Damned: The War Inside Kosovo. NYU Press. pp. 29–30. ISBN 978-0-8147-5661-4.
- Tromp, Nevenka (2016). Prosecuting Slobodan Milošević: The Unfinished Trial. Routledge. ISBN 978-1-317-33527-6.
- Under Orders: War Crimes in Kosovo. Human Rights Watch. 2001. pp. 77–78, 330. ISBN 978-1-56432-264-7.
