= Serbian Honour (paramilitary organization) =

Paramilitary organization

Serbian Honour (Serbian: Српска част, romanized: Srpska čast) is a Russian-trained and -funded Serbian ultranationalist, Russophilic, irredentist and Islamophobic paramilitary organization in Republika Srpska, Bosnia and Herzegovina, acting in support of separatist leader Milorad Dodik.

== Leadership ==
One of the group's leaders is Bojan Stojković, a former Serbian paratrooper.
