= Bratislav Dikić =

Serbian police officer

- Братислав Дикић
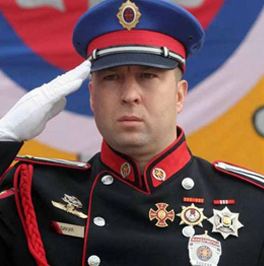
- Born: 19 May 1970 (age 56); Niš, SR Serbia, SFR Yugoslavia
- Military career
- Allegiance: Serbia
- Service years: 1989–2015
- Rank: General
- Commands: Gendarmery (2009–2013)
- Conflicts: Kosovo War (1998–1999); Insurgency in the Preševo Valley (1999-2001); Operation Sabre (2003); Montenegrin coup plot (2016)
- Awards

Bratislav Dikić (Serbian Cyrillic: Братислав Дикић; born 19 May 1970) is a Serbian former police general and the commander of the Serbian special police unit the Gendarmery from 2009 to 2013.

== Early life and education ==
Bratislav Dikić was born in 1970 in Niš, SR Serbia, SFR Yugoslavia. Dikić holds a PhD in Crisis Management at the Union University, Faculty of Management in Novi Sad.

== Police career ==
He worked in the Serbian Ministry of Internal Affairs since 15 April 1991. His first post was part of the traffic police in Priština. Starting 1 July 1992 he served in the Special Anti-Terrorist Unit (SAJ) where he successfully served for 10 years. On 1 April 1994 Dikić was promoted to the rank of Junior Inspector. He was later promoted to Police Sergeant. From 1 December 2001 he was part of the Gendarmery working on counterintelligence and gradually reached the rank of Police Lieutenant on 3 March 2009.

During his career Dikić received a number of awards and decorations including a war cross.

=== Gendarmery Commander ===
Dikić became commander of the specialized Gendarmery of Serbia, on 3 June 2009, at the suggestion of Director of the Police Force Milorad Veljović who reportedly said "He's from a good home, and most importantly, he's a decent man". Before this, Dikić was commander of the Niš unit. He was promoted to General of the Police by Interior Minister Ivica Dačić on 21 January 2011 on the occasion of the ministry's bicentennial.

As commander of the Gendarmery, Dikić was at the heart of a number of scandals. In March 2011 the Administration of the Criminal Police probed into his links to an alleged wiretapping scandal. A commission that checked the premises of the Gendarmery was formed two days after they had already been alerted to the probe. Dikić, as well as Ivica Dačić, denied these allegations. In late 2011 and early 2012, data leaked during a systematization of the Ministry of Internal Affairs generated a controversy as to whether Dikić was in the process of creating a Detachment for Special Actions modeled on the Special Operations Unit numbering 600 officers, and mostly made up of former members of the unit. Further leaks pointed to Dikić often being called "Little Legija" by members of the Gendarmery.

He denied such a nickname on the show Između dve vatre, broadcast on B92, and claimed that the actual unit being formed was an improved command unit numbering 10 to 15 officers. During the interview on Između dve vatre, Dikić was asked whether his unit had uncovered a weapons store near Novi Pazar, and transported it to their base in Vlasina, instead of alerting higher authorities. This was uncovered as part of B92's investigative journalism project Insajder. Dikić denied these claims, as well as a declassified police report from 26 July 2010 stating that Dikić's Gendarmery had transported a store of explosives and ammunition uncovered near Bujanovac to their base in Niš. According to Insajder, this, as well as a wiretapping campaign directed against Dikić's associates and organized by Dikić, was discovered during 2011 as part of a secret investigation inside the police force, code-named "System". Insajder received a confirmation of the existence of this action from the Bureau for the Coordination of Security Services in January 2012. No further details were disclosed.

On Vidovdan, 28 June 2012 the Gendarmery presented a new oath authored by Dikić to honor the Gendarmery's slava. It focused heavily on Kosovo, saying there was no Serbia and no Serbian people without it and was criticized by Interior Minister Ivica Dačić who said the oath should not be used seeing as it could be perceived as a threat.

In March 2013 Administration of the Criminal Police chief Rodoljub Milović was chased by seven vehicles allegedly belonging to the Gendarmery. According to the Blic daily, this was part of a year-long "war" between the Criminal Investigations Directorate and the Gendarmery, which started in April 2012 when members of the Gendarmery arrested two police officers who had been following them as part of an investigation targeting Dikić concerning the wiretapping scandal. Two other inspectors from the Sector for Internal Control, Ivan Petković and Ljubiša Puzović, had already been chased by cars thought to belong to the Gendarmery. The wiretapping investigation led the Sector for Internal Control to believe that the Gendarmery was behind a money laundering and racketeering campaign headed by Dikić's brother Dragan Dikić. Dikić denied these claims and posted on his Facebook profile that he was a thorn in the side to all enemies of Serbia, saying "The thing that's bothering them is that I'm a Serb".

Vladimir Božović, the State Secretary in charge of internal control, ordered an investigation against members of the Gendarmery and Dikić's brother regarding these claims. Dačić supported the investigation and stressed that it was not necessarily against Dikić himself, rather that the investigation was primarily against his associates. In May 2013 allegations surfaced that members of the Gendarmery had been illegally digging for gold near Gamzigrad under the pretext of holding practice marches.

In June 2013 Dikić and members of the Gendarmery were controversially featured prominently in a music video for the song "Moja zemlja" (My Land) by the band Amadeus Bend, with the slogan "God and the Gendarmery keep Serbia safe". The Ministry of Internal Affairs stated that no one had previously authorized this, and that he needed special permission from the media bureau. On 27 June 2013 the Gendarmery hosted an unauthorized public exercise as a show of force on Ada Ciganlija in front of tens of thousands of spectators. The show included a concert by Amadeus Bend and was advertised throughout Belgrade under the same slogan as the song. It was supposed to celebrate Vidovdan, and seeing as it was unauthorized both Dačić and Director of the Police Force Milorad Veljović refused to show up.

=== Deputy Police Commissioner and retirement ===
He served as commander of Gendarmery until July 2013, when he was appointed as Deputy Police Commissioner. Two years later, Dikić retired after being sacked from public service in December 2015 after reports of alleged involvement in organised crime.

== Political work ==
Upon his retirement, rumors surfaced that Dikić was to be at the top of an electoral list submitted by the War Veterans of Serbia for the 2016 election.

Dikić formed the Patriotic Movement of Serbia (PPS) with Željko Vukelić and Zoran Vranešević on 10 February 2016. The movement intended to draw votes from veterans and war invalids. The PPS held an anti-NATO protest in Niš on 4 March 2016 with the Oathkeepers led by Milica Đurđević, the Movement for Serbia led by Dikić's lawyer Goran Petronijević and Serbian Honor. The PPS was part of the coalition around the Socialist Party of Serbia at the 2016 Vojvodina elections.

=== Montenegrin coup attempt ===
During the 2016 Montenegrin parliamentary election, Dikić was arrested for coup allegations. On May 9, 2019, he was sentenced to eight years in prison by Higher Court of Montenegro for attempted coup. On February 15, 2021, he was released from prison after Appeals Court of Montenegro annulled the verdict and he returned to Serbia after four years in prison.
