= Gendarmery (Serbia) =

Special police force of Serbia

Gendarmery Жандармерија Žandarmerija
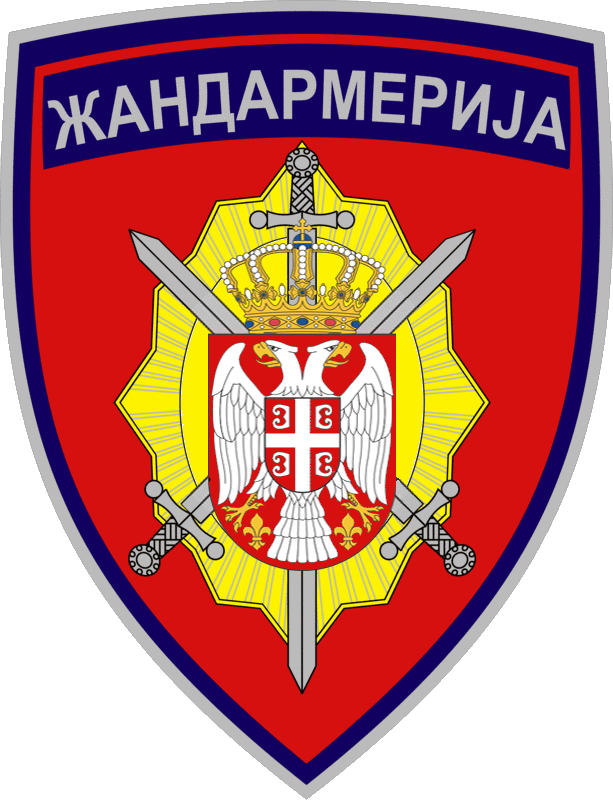
- Emblem of the Gendarmery

Agency overview
- Formed: 1860 (current form since 2001)
- Preceding agency: Special Police Units
- Employees: 2,800

Jurisdictional structure
- Operations jurisdiction: Serbia
- Governing body: Police of Serbia
- General nature: Gendarmerie

Operational structure
- Overseen by: Police Directorate
- Headquarters: Belgrade
- Agency executive: Col. Radoslav Repac, Commander

The Gendarmery (Serbian: Жандармерија, romanized: Žandarmerija) is the national gendarmerie force of Serbia, tasked with high-risk and specialized law enforcement duties. It is under the authority of the Police Directorate of the Serbian Police.

== History ==
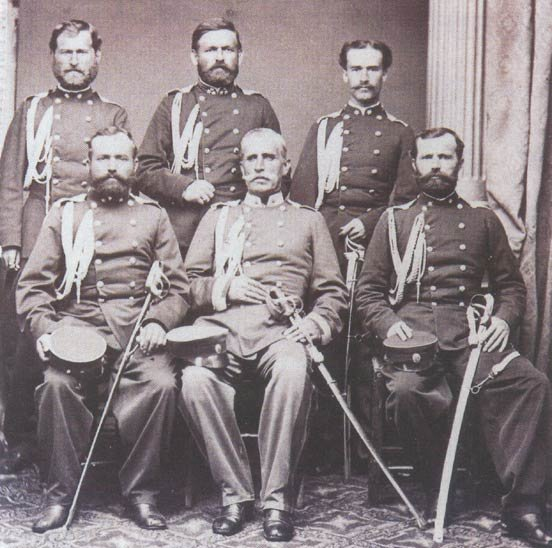
Gendarmery officers, 1865

The word žandarmerija is a French loanword ("gendarmerie"), and is pronounced "zhandarmeriya". The Žandarmerija corps date back to the Principality of Serbia, established on June 28, 1860, and originally consisted of 120 infantrymen and 15 cavalrymen. From 15 to 17 June 1862, the Serbian Gendarmerie played a crucial role in the conflicts around the Čukur fountain in Belgrade - a little more than 100 gendarmes opposed a Turkish force several hundred times stronger and practically saved Belgrade and Serbia. The 1884 Law on the Gendarmerie established the State Gendarmerie which was organized into detachments with one detachment in Belgrade and every district town. In 1919, the Gendarmerie became an integral part of the Royal Army of the Kingdom of Yugoslavia, tasked for watching over public order and security, maintaining order and peace and ensuring the execution of the laws. The Gendarmerie was subordinated to the Minister of Military Affairs in terms of supply, discipline and military training, and in terms of use, training, maintenance of public security and gendarmerie service - to the Ministry of the Internal Affairs. After World War II gendarmery was disbanded only to be re-established more than half a century later, in 2001, after the disbandment of the Special Police Units (Posebna Jedinica Policije, PJP). One of its first major assignments of newly-formed Gendarmery was the capture of the suspects in the assassination of Prime Minister Zoran Đinđić. That same year, the Counter-Terrorist Unit was established within Gendarmery, but was separated in 2007 to become an independent unit within the Police. In 2005 the Persons and Infrastructure Protection Unit was established, to carry out close protection and technical protection tasks. In 2011 the Gendarmery was reorganized and the First Quick Response Detachment was established, consisting of the specialist companies of all Gendarmery detachments along with the Diving Center.

== Missions ==
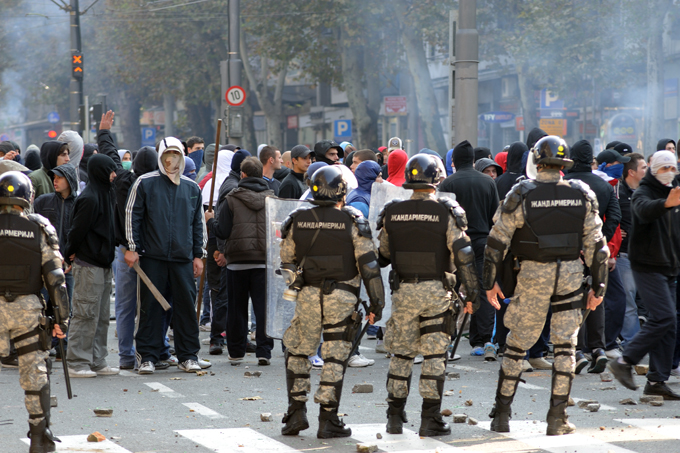
Clashes between Gendarmery personnel and rioters during the 2010 Belgrade anti-gay riot

The Gendarmery's missions include:

- Restoring public peace and order if it has been heavily disturbed (including riot control)
- Countering organized crime, terrorist and other violent groups
- Repressing prison riots
- Providing security to the security-sensitive foreign embassies in Serbia (those of the United States, China, Russia, Germany, United Kingdom, France, Italy, Turkey, Israel, Croatia and Albania)
- Securing the 384 kilometers long and 5 km wide Ground Safety Zone along the administrative line between Serbia and Kosovo (in joint action with infantry battalions of the Serbian Army)

It may also perform any duties decreed in the laws and regulations.

== Structure ==
The Gendarmery is organized into four battalion-sized detachments (odredi), each with their own territorial jurisdiction (based in Belgrade, Novi Sad, Niš, and Kraljevo). Every detachment is organized as an independent unit to be able to execute its everyday duties within its jurisdiction although, if needed, it can provide assistance to other detachments as well. The structure of each detachment is as follows:

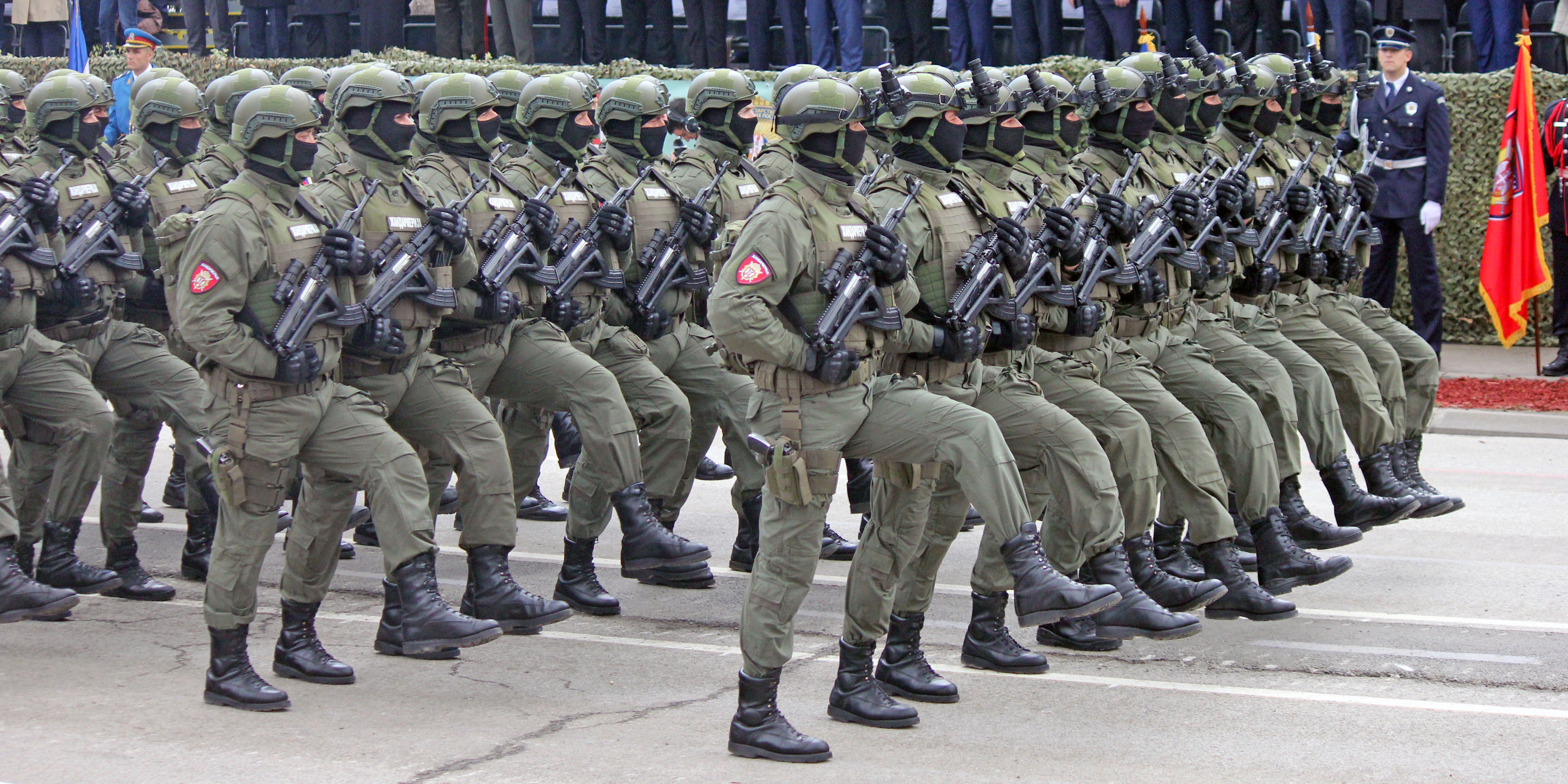
Echelon march of Gendarmery members

- Command
- General-purpose unit (composed of a general-purpose company and fire support platoon); specialized in crowd and riot control.
- Specialist unit (composed of: counter-terrorist company, reconnaissance platoon, sniper team, K-9 team and mine-explosive team), specialized in counter-terrorism, fighting violent groups, organized crime groups.
- Security unit (company-size unit in Belgrade-based detachment, platoon-size unit in other detachments); specialized in tasks of physical and technical protection of sensitive sites (protection of certain foreign embassies in case of Belgrade-based detachment or other sensitive sites in case of other detachments).
- Armored vehicles unit, tasked with mechanized support to other units of the detachment.

In addition to the detachments deployed throughout the country, the Gendarmery has one specialized unit: the Diving Unit of the Gendarmery (Ronilačka jedinica Žandarmerije), headquartered in Belgrade. It is tasked with conducting special actions in water-dominated environments and consists of three specialist teams: intervention team, searching team and nautical team.

== Equipment ==
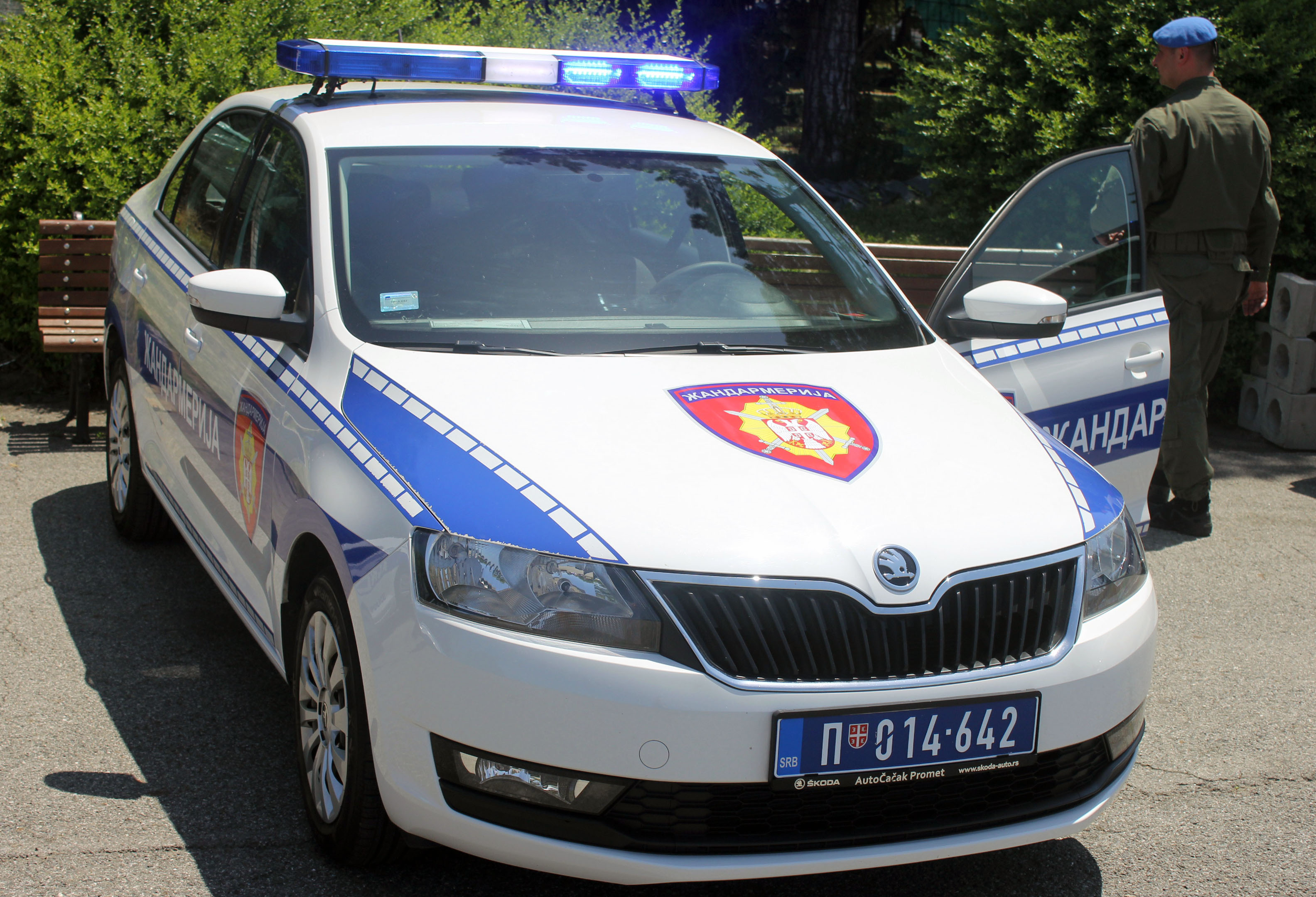
Škoda Rapid patrol car

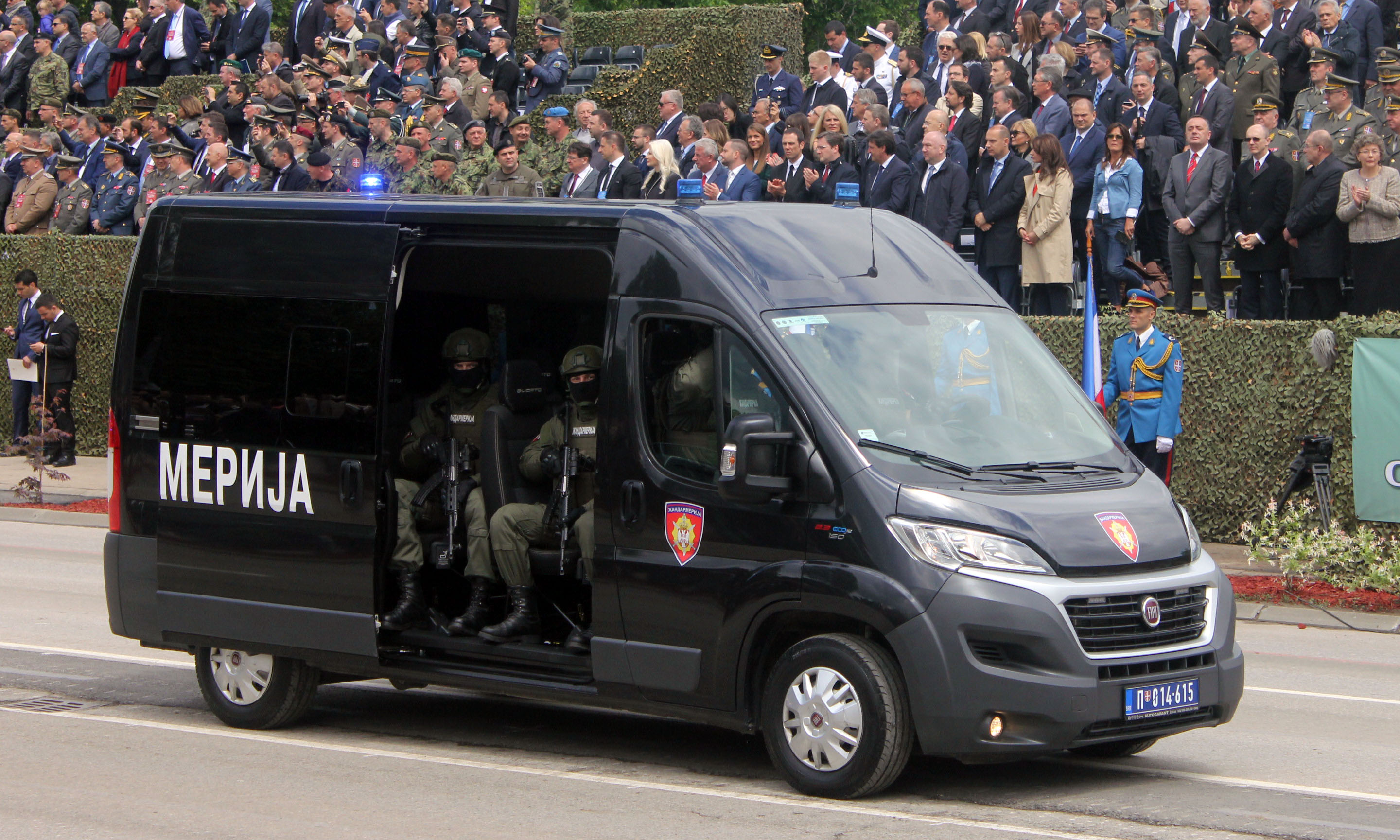
Fiat Ducato van

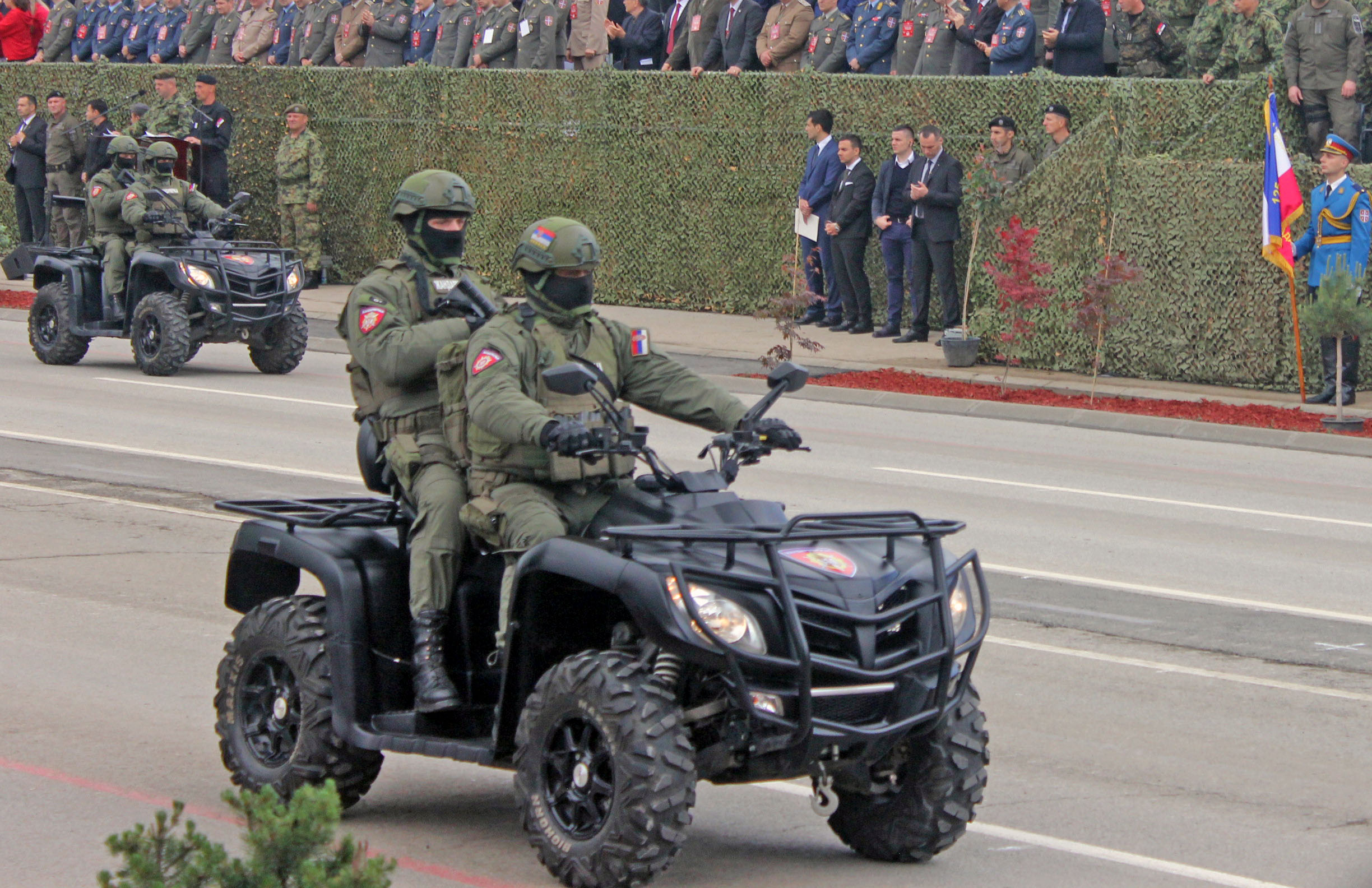
Kodiak 700 quad

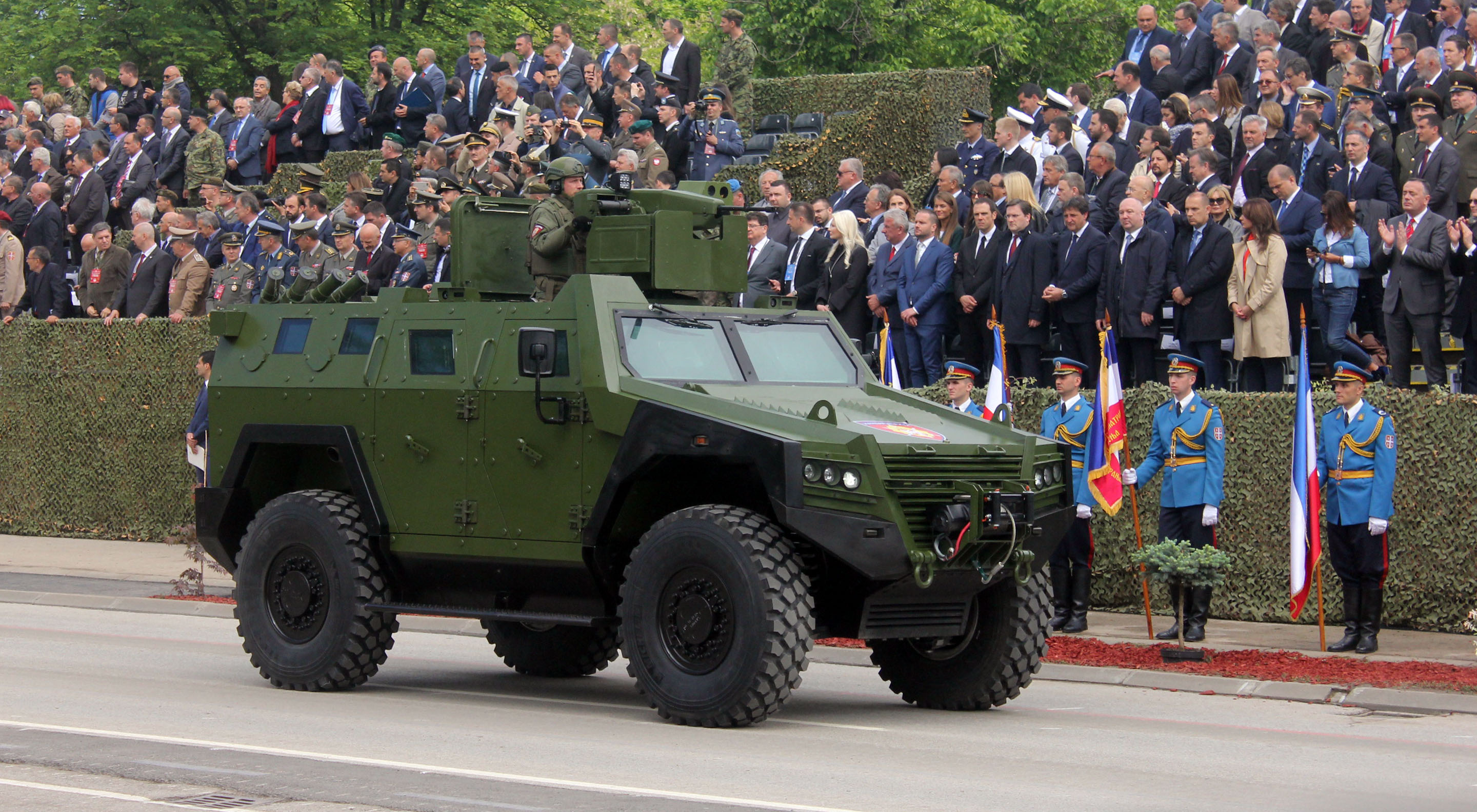
BOV M16 Miloš armored vehicle

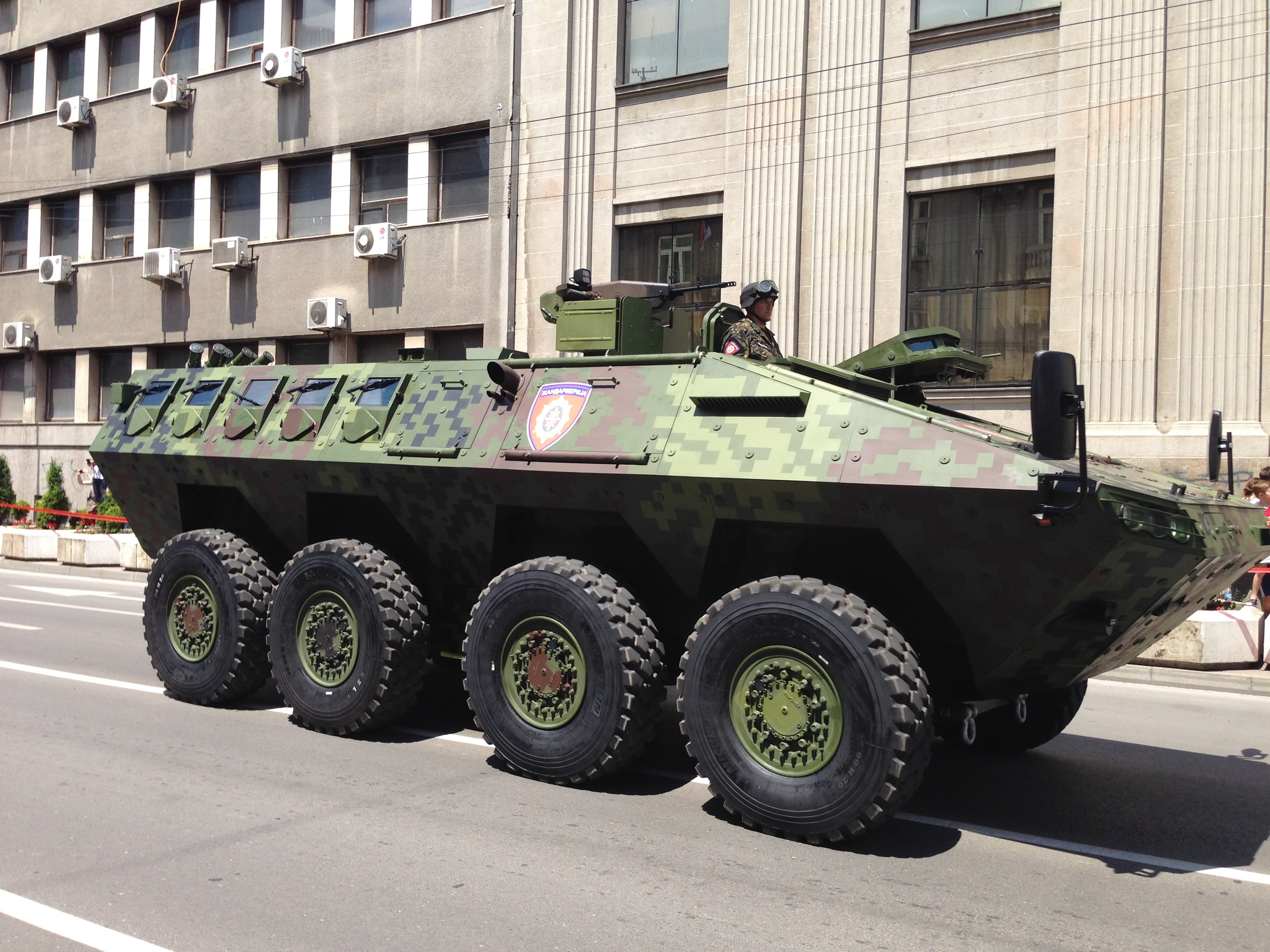
Lazar-3 armored personnel carrier

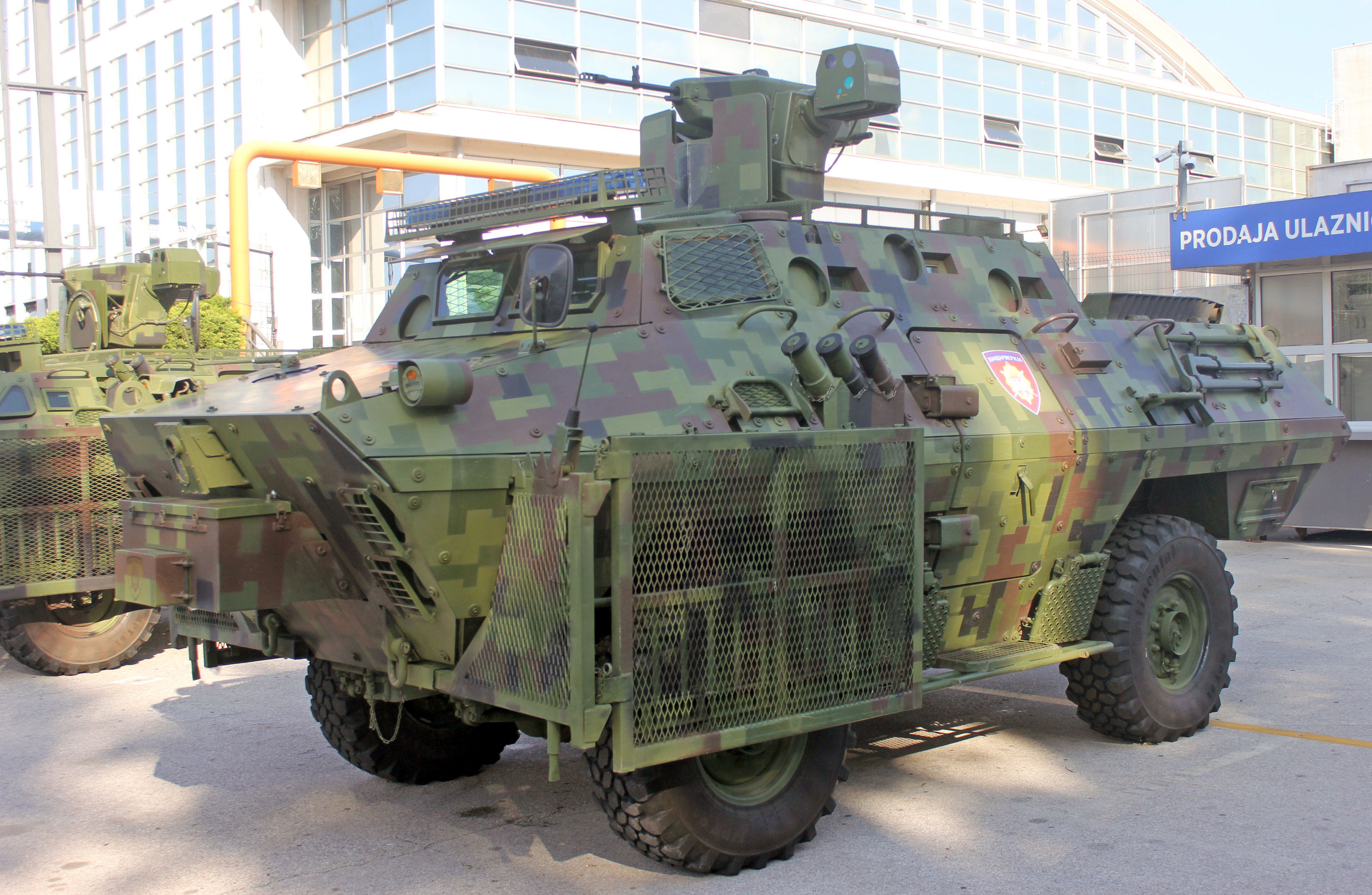
BOV M15 armored personnel carrier

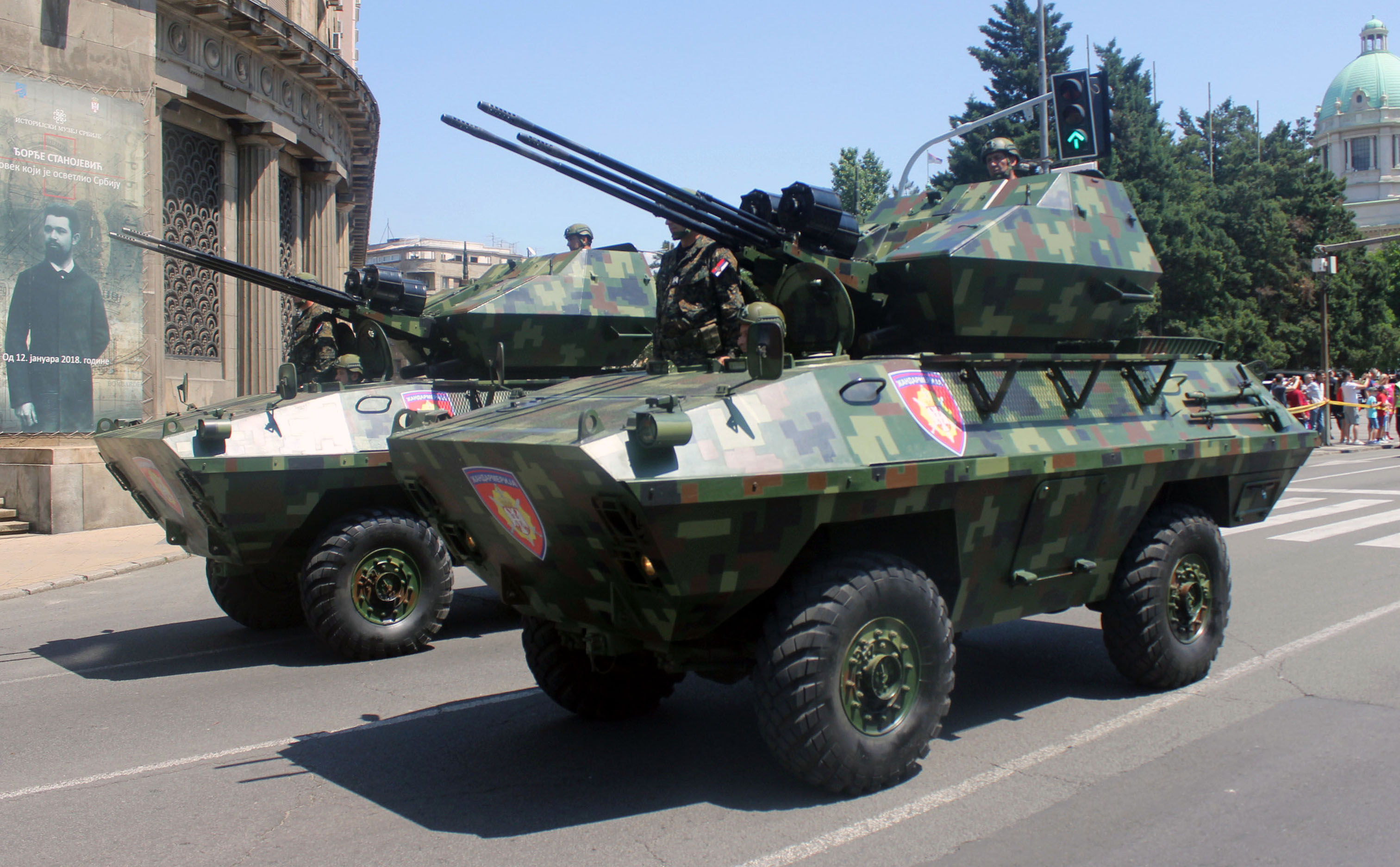
BOV-3 self-propelled anti-aircraft guns

The following equipment is in operational use as of 2024:

=== Firearms ===
- Handgun:
  - Zastava CZ99
  - Glock 17 - used by the specialist units
- Carbine:
  - Colt M4 - used by the specialist units
- Submachine gun:
  - Heckler & Koch MP5
- Light machine gun:
  - Zastava M84
- Heavy machine gun:
  - Browning M2 - mounted on armored vehicles
- Assault rifle:
  - Zastava M21
- Sniper rifle:
  - Barrett M95 - used by the specialist units
  - HK G3 - used by the specialist units
- Anti-materiel rifle:
  - Zastava M93 Black Arrow - used by the specialist units
- Automatic grenade launcher:
  - Zastava M93

=== Vehicles ===
==== Motor Vehicles ====
- Patrol cars:
  - Škoda Rapid
- Offroad patrol cars:
  - Land Rover Defender
  - Toyota Land Cruiser
- Offroad patrol quads:
  - Yamaha Kodiak 700
- Vans:
  - Fiat Ducato
- Riot-control trucks:
  - TAM 110 T7 B/BV (some with mounted water cannon)

==== Armored Vehicles ====
- Armored multipurpose vehicles:
  - BOV M16 Miloš
  - Humvee (30)
  - Land Rover Defender
- Armored personnel carriers:
  - Lazar 3 (12)
  - BOV M15 (6)
  - BOV M11 (12)
  - BOV M86 (20)
- Self-propelled Anti-aircraft Guns
  - M53/59 Praga (3)
  - BOV-3 (2)

=== Watercraft ===
- Patrol cabin boats:
  - Vuk (7) - used by the Diving Unit
- Multirole fast combat boats:
  - Premax 39 (1) - used by the Diving Unit
- Rigid inflatable boats:
  - Zodiac 730 - used by the Diving Unit

== Commanders ==
Since its re-establishment in 2001, the Gendarmery has had nine Commanders:

Name	Tenure
Col. Goran Radosavljević	2001–2004
Col. Borivoje Tešić	2004–2008
Col. Srđan Grekulović	2008–2009
Col. Bratislav Dikić	2009–2013
Col. Milenko Božović	2013–2015
Col. Goran Dragović	2015–2018
Col. Dejan Luković	2018–2023
Col. Saša Kosović	2023–2025
Col. Radoslav Repac	2025–present

== Traditions ==
=== Anniversary ===
The anniversary is celebrated on 28 June, in memory of the day in 1860 when the Gendarmery was established.

=== Patron saint ===
The unit's slava or its saint's feast day is Vidovdan (Saint Vitus).

== See also ==
- Police of Serbia
